= Livoberezhna railway station =

Railway station in Ukraine

Livoberezhna Лівобережна
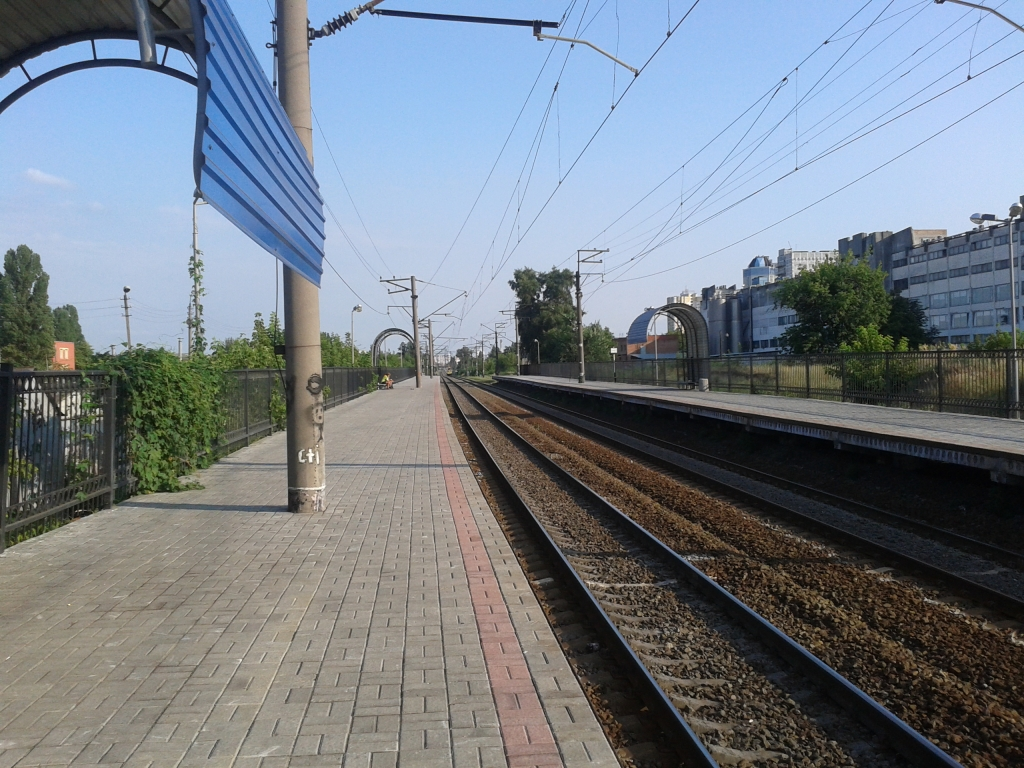

General information
- Coordinates: 50.4529°N 30.6036°E
- System: Southwestern Railway station
- Owner: Ukrzaliznytsia

History
- Opened: 2011

Services
Preceding station	Ukrainian Railways	Following station
Mykilska Slobidka toward Darnytsia	Kyiv City Express	Rusanivka toward Darnytsia
Location

Livoberezhna (Ukrainian: Лівобережна) is a railway stop that is located in Kyiv, Ukraine. It is part of the Kyiv Directorate of Southwestern Railways.
