= Karavaievi Dachi railway station =

Railway station in Kyiv, Ukraine

Karavaevi Dachi Караваєві Дачі
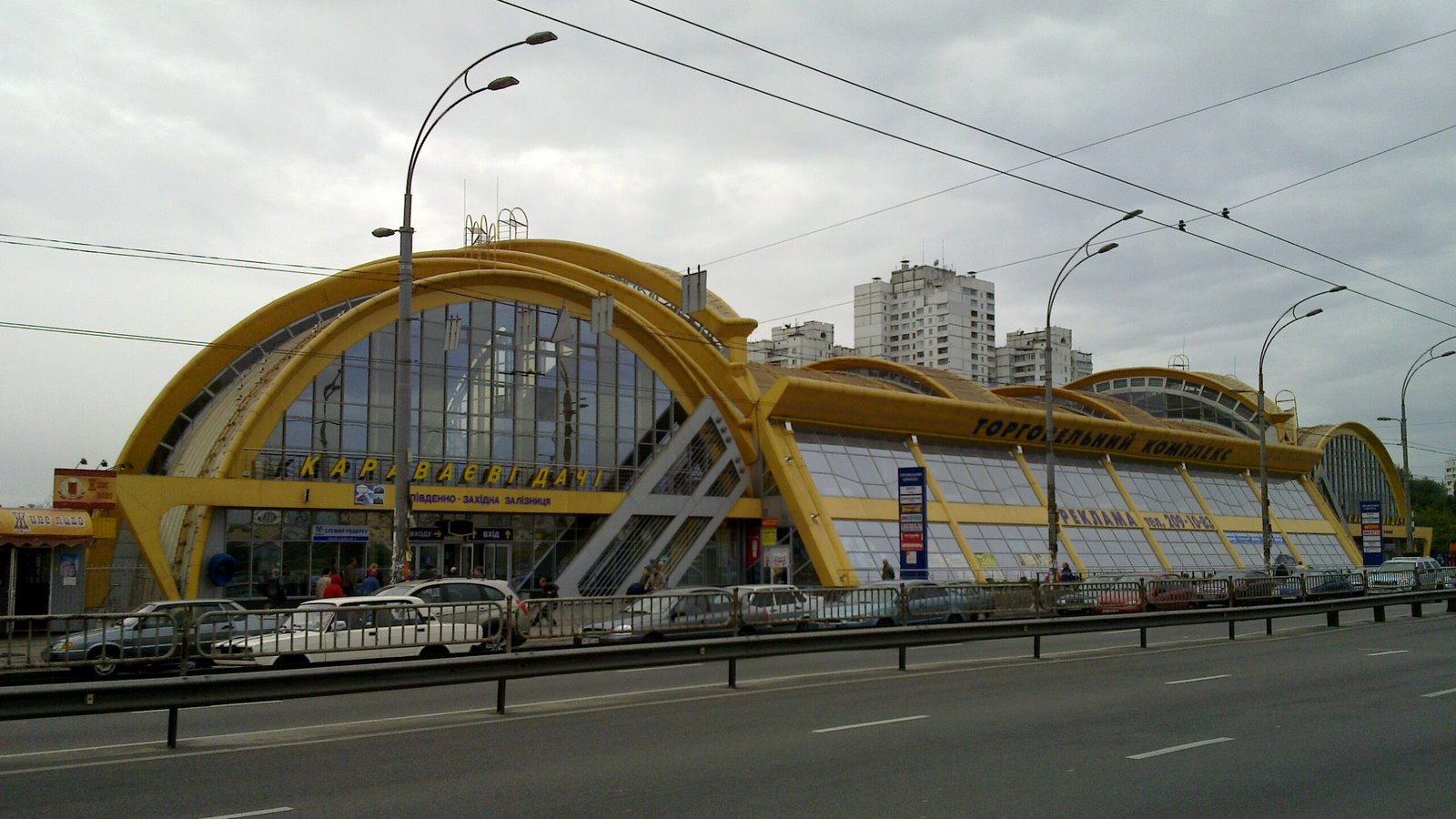

General information
- Coordinates: 50°26′17.07″N 30°26′56.32″E
- System: Southwestern Railways station
- Owner: Southwestern Railways
- Platforms: 3
- Tracks: 5

Other information
- Station code: 320312

History
- Opened: 1926
- Electrified: Yes (1950)

Services
Preceding station	Ukrainian Railways	Following station
Kyiv-Volynskyi	Southwestern Railways	Vokzalna
Kyiv-Volynskyi	Southwestern Railways	Kyiv-Pasazhyrskyi
Kyiv-Volynskyi toward Darnytsia	Kyiv City Express	Vokzalna toward Darnytsia
Location

Karavaievi Dachi is railway stop in Kyiv, Ukraine. It is served by local Ukrzaliznytsia trains Kyivpastrans' Kyiv Urban Rail. The stop's name comes from the historic neighborhood where it is located.
