= Vydubychi railway station =

Railway station in Ukraine

Vydubychi Видубичі
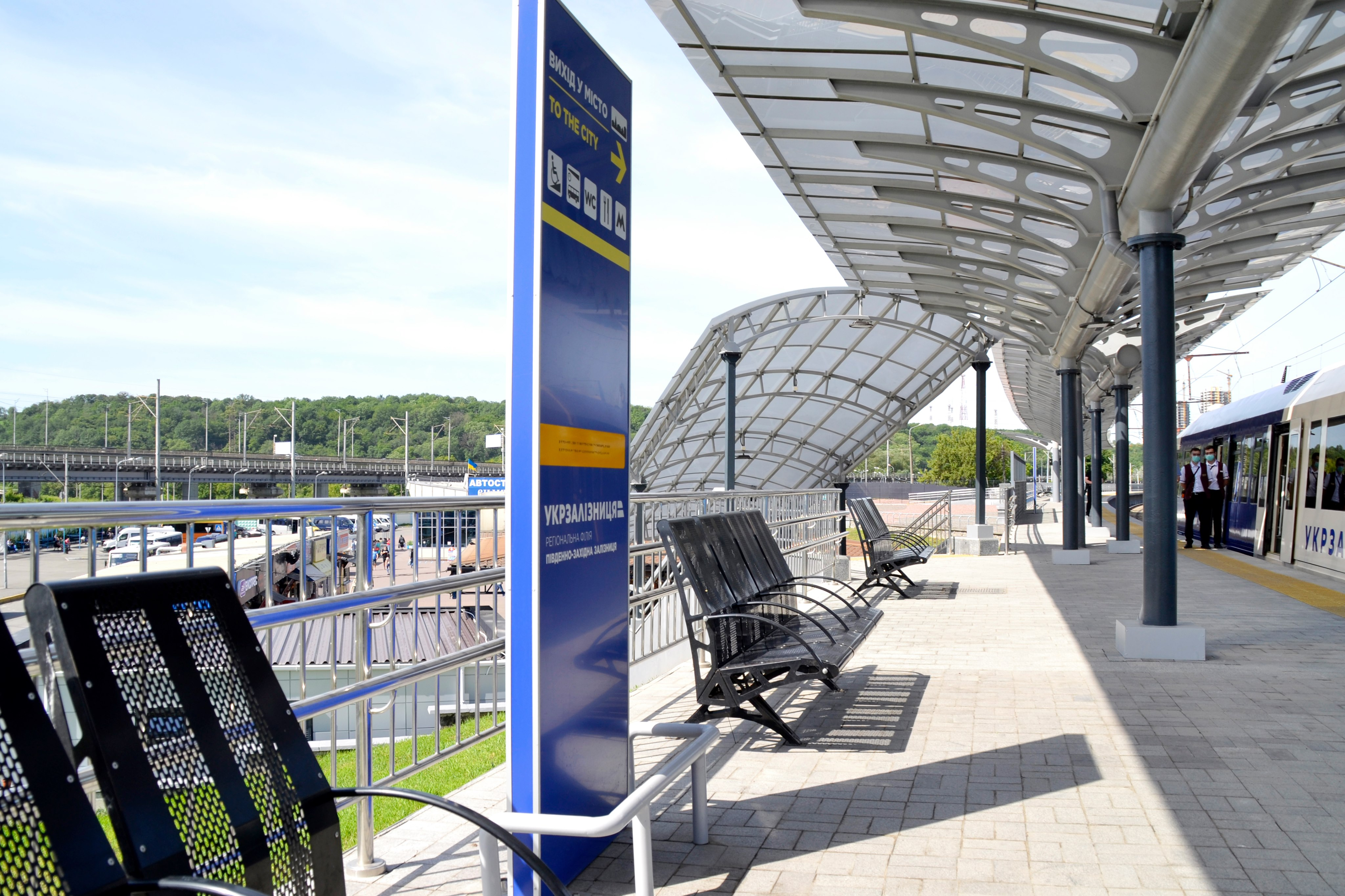

General information
- Location: Zaliznychne Highway, Kyiv, Ukraine
- Coordinates: 50°24′10″N 30°33′33″E
- System: Southwestern Railway station
- Owner: Ukrzaliznytsia
- Platforms: 3
- Tracks: 3

Construction
- Structure type: At-grade

Other information
- Station code: 320098

History
- Opened: 2001
- Rebuilt: 2020

Services
Preceding station	Ukrainian Railways	Following station
Kyiv-Demiivskyi	Southwestern Railways	Berezniaky
Kyiv-Pasazhyrskyi Terminus	Kyiv Boryspil Express	Darnytsia toward Boryspil Airport
Kyiv-Demiivskyi toward Darnytsia	Kyiv City Express	Berezniaky toward Darnytsia
Location

Vydubychi (Ukrainian: Видубичі) is a railway station in Kyiv, Ukraine. It is part of the Kyiv Directorate of the Southwestern Railways. The station forms a transportation hub with the Vydubychi-Trypilski railway station which serves southbound trains, the Vydubychi metro station of the Kyiv Metro's Syretsko–Pecherska line and the Vydubychi bus station serving long distance buses.

== History ==
The stopping point was opened along with the reconstruction of the Vydubychi metro station in the summer of 2001, replacing an earlier stop called Botanichna operating since 1914, located near the Hryshko National Botanical Garden a little further towards the Darnytsia Railway Bridge.

A major bus station opened next to the station on August 23, 2012.

In June 2020, Ukrzaliznytsia completed the reconstruction of the Vydubychi railway stop intended to adapt it for use as middle stop by Kyiv Boryspil Express opened in 2018, linking the Kyiv-Pasazhyrskyi railway station in the city center with the Boryspil International Airport. The renovation included a new platform and accessibility improvements.

The new platform unites railways, auto and air transport, as well as the subway into a single logistics chain. In the future the platform is supposed to also serve InterCity+ trains.

== Infrastructure ==
Since 4 October 2011, Vydubychi became one of the stops of the Kyiv Urban Rail, and from 15 June 2020 — one of the stops Kyiv Boryspil Express.
