= Kyiv-Demiivskyi railway station =

Railway station in Ukraine

Kyiv-Demiivskyi Київ-Деміївський
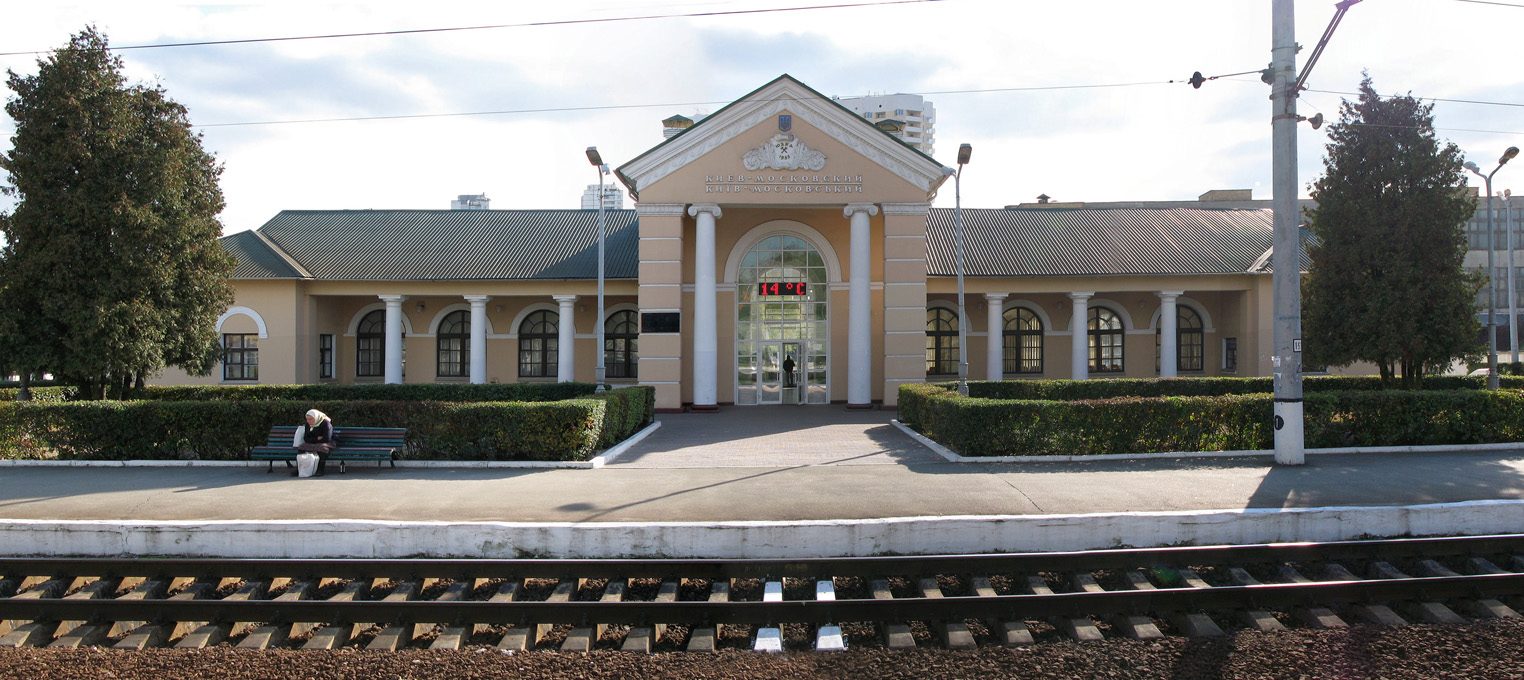

General information
- Coordinates: 50°24′18″N 30°32′15″E
- System: Southwestern Railway station
- Owner: Ukrzaliznytsia
- Platforms: 2
- Tracks: 14

Construction
- Structure type: At-grade

Other information
- Station code: 320100

History
- Opened: 1870

Services
Preceding station	Ukrainian Railways	Following station
Protasiv Yar	Southwestern Railways	Vydubychi
Protasiv Yar	Southwestern Railways	Vydubychi-Trypilski
Protasiv Yar toward Darnytsia	Kyiv City Express	Vydubychi toward Darnytsia
Location

Kyiv-Demiivskyi (Ukrainian: Київ-Деміївський, before 1950 Kyiv-2, and until 2017 Kyiv-Moskovskyi) is a railway stop that is located in Kyiv, Ukraine. It is part of the Kyiv Directorate of (Southwestern Railways).
