= Rusanivka railway station =

Railway station in Ukraine

Rusanivka Русанівка
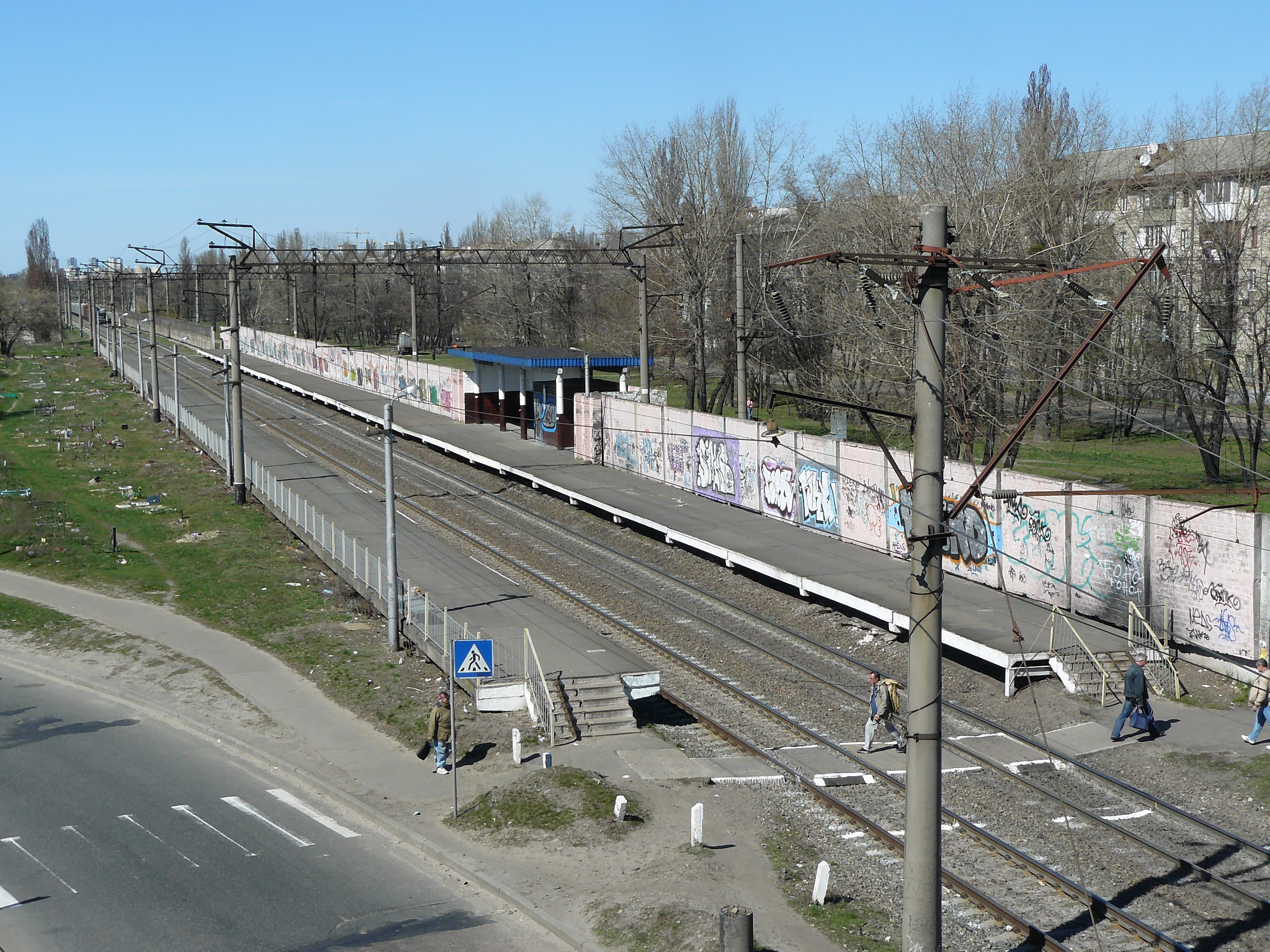

General information
- Location: 1 Vyfleiemska Street
- Coordinates: 50°26′22″N 30°36′42″E
- System: Southwestern Railway station
- Owner: Ukrzaliznytsia
- Platforms: 2
- Tracks: 2

Other information
- Station code: 320064

History
- Opened: 1974
- Closed: 2011
- Rebuilt: 2022

Services
Preceding station	Ukrainian Railways	Following station
Livoberezhna toward Darnytsia	Kyiv City Express	Darnytsia Terminus
Location

Rusanivka (Ukrainian: Русанівка; until 2024, Kyivska Rusanivka) is a railway stop that is located in Kyiv, Ukraine. It is part of the Kyiv Directorate of Southwestern Railways. It was opened in 1974 due to the appearance and construction of the Rusanivka district.

It is located on the north part of the Kyiv Railway Loop, a bypass railway line that connects Borshchahivka and Darnytsia stations via Pochaina station, between Mykilska Slobidka and Darnytsia. That part of the line where the bus stop is located originated in 1929 and was electrified in the 1960s.

The station is located between Vyfleiemska and Sverstiuka Streets, near an overpass where Sobornosti Avenue crosses the railway line.

The area near the platform is also well known among Kyivites for the fact that a so-called "dog cemetery" has long been located there, where pets are buried. In recent years, Kyiv authorities have announced their intention to relocate it, but a new, official burial site has not yet been opened.

After the launch of the city train in 2011, the station was closed. Originally re-commissioning was planned in 2013 together with the launch of the third stage of the city electric train. In 2022 during the ongoing Russian invasion of Ukraine the station has been temporarily reopened since 19 April, following emergency repairs carried out using internal resources of the Ukrainian State Railway, a full reconstruction is to take place after Russia is defeated.

On 18 January 2024, Kyivska Rusanivka railway station was renamed to Rusanivka railway station.
