= Berezniaky railway station =

Railway station in Ukraine

Berezniaky Березняки
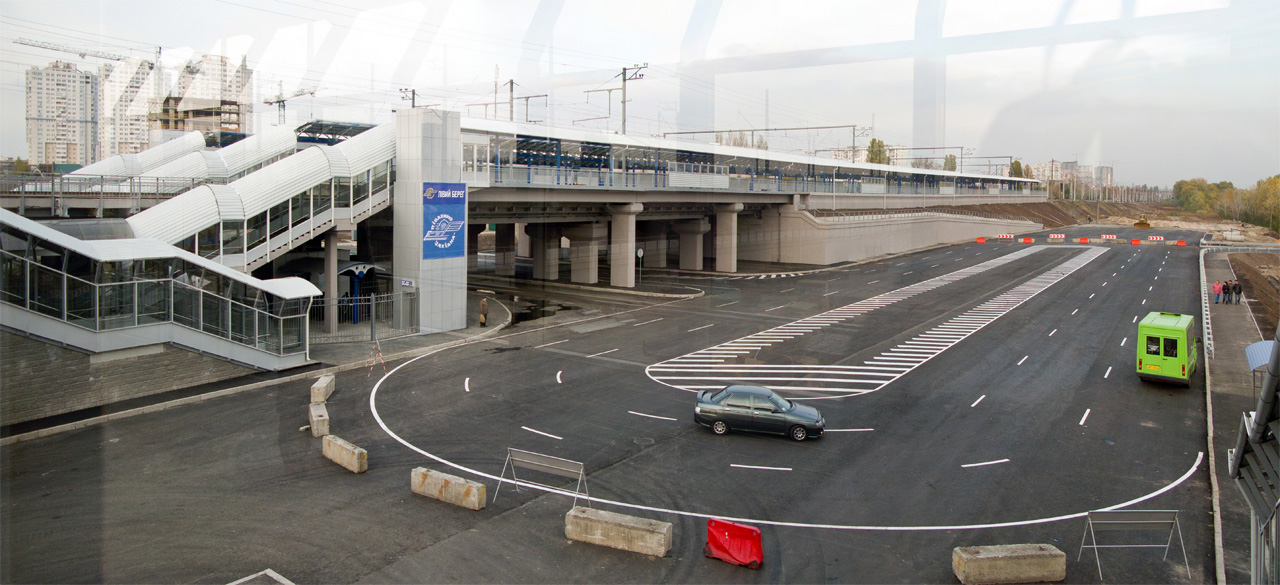

General information
- Coordinates: 50°25′16″N 30°36′21″E
- System: Southwestern Railway station
- Owner: Ukrzaliznytsia
- Platforms: 3
- Tracks: 4

Construction
- Structure type: At-grade

Other information
- Station code: 320079

History
- Opened: 1909
- Rebuilt: 2010

Services
Preceding station	Ukrainian Railways	Following station
Vydubychi	Southwestern Railways	Darnytsia
Vydubychi toward Darnytsia	Kyiv City Express	Darnytsia Terminus
Location

Berezniaky (Ukrainian: Березняки; until 2024, Livyi Bereh) is a railway stop that is located in Kyiv, Ukraine. It is part of the Kyiv Directorate of (Southwestern Railways).

On 18 January 2024, Livyi Bereh railway station was renamed to Berezniaky railway station.
