= Mykilska Slobidka railway station =

Railway station in Ukraine

Mykilska Slobidka Микільська Слобідка
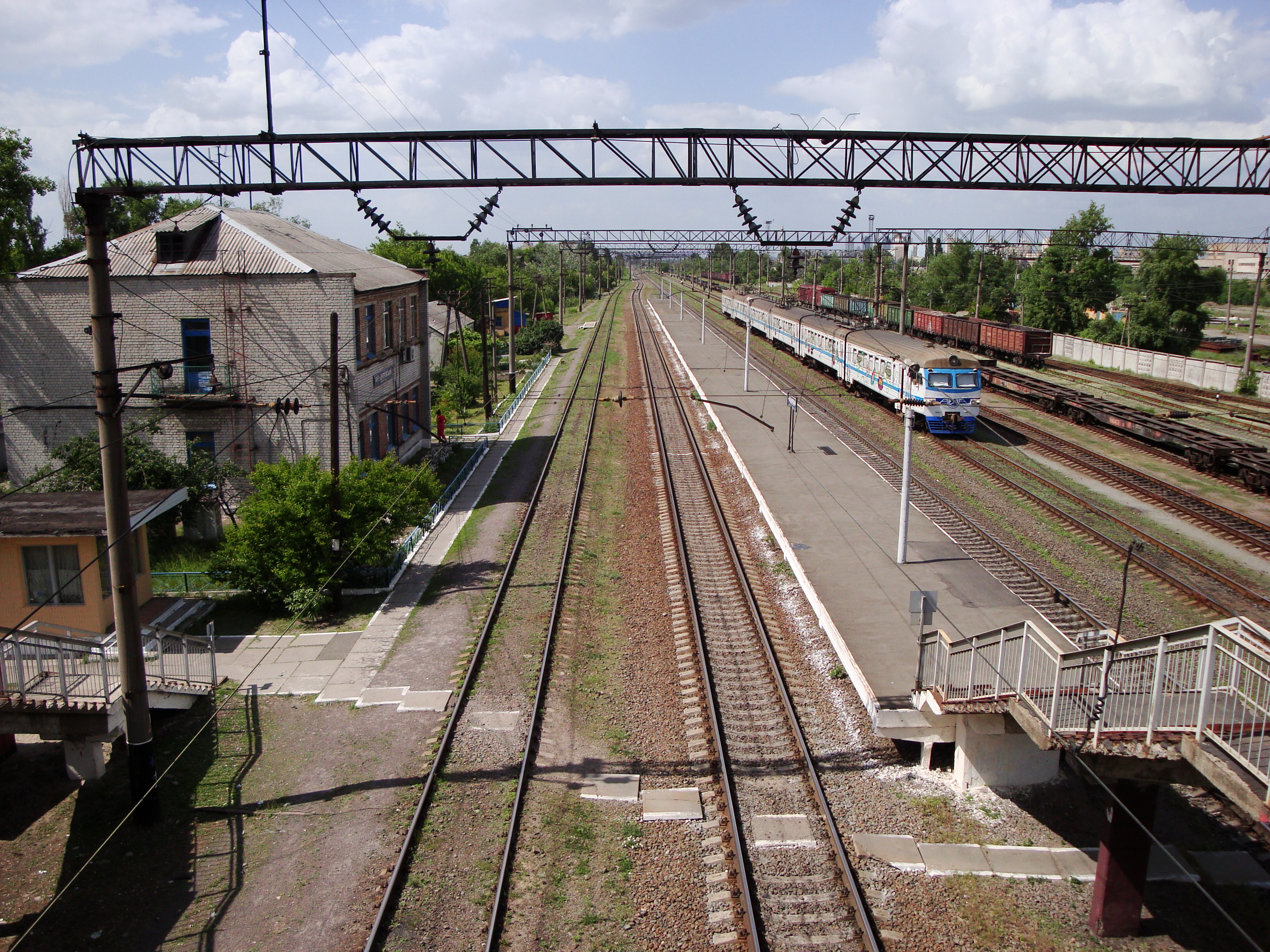

General information
- Coordinates: 50°27′46″N 30°35′44″E
- System: Southwestern Railway station
- Owner: Ukrzaliznytsia
- Platforms: 2
- Tracks: 15

Other information
- Station code: 320702

History
- Opened: 1929

Services
Preceding station	Ukrainian Railways	Following station
Voskresenka toward Darnytsia	Kyiv City Express	Livoberezhna toward Darnytsia
Location

Mykilska Slobidka (Ukrainian: Микільська Слобідка; until 2024, Kyiv-Dniprovskyi) is a railway stop that is located in Kyiv, Ukraine. It is part of the Kyiv Directorate of Southwestern Railways.

== History ==
The line on which the railway station exists was built in 1914-1915 as part of a strategic ring line around the city (construction began in the mid-1910s and was completed in 1929). The station was opened not later than 1931; it was called Mykilska Slobidka, and later Vyhurivschyna. The name Kyiv-Dniprovskyi was used since 1974.

In the mid-1970s, a sidetrack for tourist trains was built at Kyiv-Dniprovskyi. It was reached from Brovarskyi Avenue and buses with tourists had the opportunity to approach practically the trains. A parking lot for 10 buses was set up at the station as well.

The parking lot of tourist trains provided that the train did not just disembark passengers (who can be taken to the depot), and if the city is large and interesting enough that in one day can not be explored, then all days when the group is on a tour, the train that brought this group - stand near the platforms, and those who came for a tour - had the opportunity to spend the night in their cars. Also next to these platforms was equipped the appropriate infrastructure - dining room, laundry, shower/toilets. Despite the fact that overnight stays in hotels/camps for tourists traveling on tourist trains were also sometimes provided, but not always, so the passengers of the tourist train had the opportunity to spend the night in carriages - because at that time in Kyiv, hotels were scarce.

Currently, the station is used exclusively as a freight station and as a stop for the Kyiv Urban Rail.

On 18 January 2024, Kyiv-Dniprovskyi railway station was renamed to Mykilska Slobidka railway station.
