= Kyiv-Pasazhyrskyi railway station =

Railway station in Kyiv, Ukraine

Kyiv-Pasazhyrskyi Київ-Пасажирський
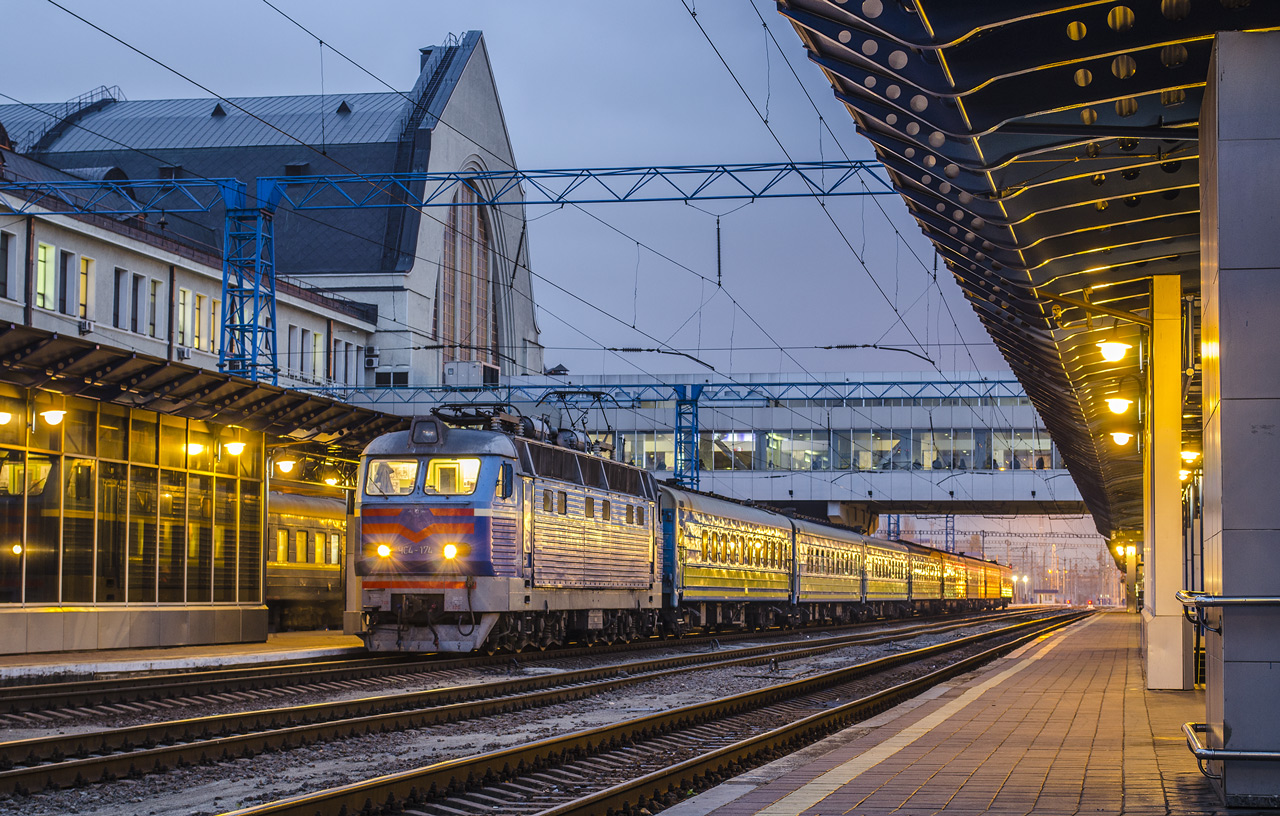

General information
- Location: Vokzalna Ploshcha, Kyiv, Ukraine
- Coordinates: 50°26′26″N 30°29′22″E
- System: Southwestern Railway terminal
- Owner: Ukrzaliznytsia
- Platforms: 7
- Tracks: 14
- Connections: Tram, light rail Metro (at Vokzalna)

Construction
- Structure type: At-grade
- Parking: Yes
- Cycle facilities: Yes

Other information
- Station code: 320308

History
- Opened: 1870; 156 years ago
- Rebuilt: 1932, 2001
- Electrified: 1950

Services
Preceding station	Ukrainian Railways	Following station
Karavaievi Dachi	Southwestern Railways	Kyiv-Tovarnyi
Karavaievi Dachi	Southwestern Railways	Protasiv Yar
Terminus	Kyiv Boryspil Express	Vydubychi toward Boryspil Airport
Karavaievi Dachi toward Darnytsia	Kyiv City Express	Protasiv Yar toward Darnytsia
Long-distance trains
Vinnytsia toward Lviv	Invincibility	Myrhorod toward Kramatorsk
Terminus	Khadzhybey	Darnytsia toward Odesa-Holovna
Terminus	Chornomorets	Vinnytsia toward Odesa-Holovna
Terminus	Kryvorizzhya	Trypillia-Dniprovske toward Kryvorizzhya
Kovel toward Warsaw West	Kyiv-Express	Terminus
Kozyatyn I toward Uzhhorod	Desna	Terminus
Lviv toward Rakhiv	Les Kurbas	Poltava-Kyivska toward Kharkiv
Lviv toward Kharkiv	Skovoroda Express	Lubin toward Uzhhorod
Vinnytsia toward Truskavets	Evening Dawns	Konotop toward Kharkiv
Fastiv I toward Truskavets	Kobzar	Terminus
Shepetivka toward Chernivtsi	Halychyna	Darnytsa toward Poltava-Pivdenna or Kremenchuk
Svyatoshyn toward Kovel	Svityaz	Terminus
Fastiv I toward Rivne	Mykolaiv	Myronivka toward Mykolaiv
Koziatyn I toward Revaca	351/352	Terminus
Preceding station	ÖBB	Following station
Lviv towards Wien Hbf	Schnellzug	Terminus

Immovable Monument of Local Significance of Ukraine
- Official name: Залізничний вокзал (Railway station building)
- Type: Architecture
- Reference no.: 3271-Кв
Location

Kyiv-Pasazhyrskyi (Ukrainian: Київ-Пасажирський [ˈkɪjiu̯ pɐsɐˈʒɪrsʲkɪi̯], lit. 'Kyiv-Passenger') is a railway station in Kyiv, the capital of Ukraine. The station is a railway hub consisting of several railroad station buildings, along with its own repair facilities the Kyiv Electric Railcar Repair Shop, a railway depot with railyard, and the railway sports complex, which is integrated into the cityscape. The station is part of the so-called Kyiv Southern Railway loop.

Serving more than 170,000 passengers per day (as of 2005), the complex contains several buildings. The Central and Southern (Pivdennyi) Station buildings are located on both sides of the tracks used by long-distance trains, connected with an overpass leading the station platform. They serve international trains, most Ukrzaliznytsia passenger trains, some suburban trains, and the Kyiv Boryspil Express to the Boryspil International Airport. Adjacent to the Central building is the Suburban (Prymiskyi) station building which serves short-distance service (elektrichka) for suburbs (including dacha areas), minor city stations, and nearby regions as well as the Kyivpastrans' urban rail passing through the Vokzalna railway stop (before 2024 known as Northern, or Pivnichna station).

The Kyiv Metro station Vokzalna of the Sviatoshynsko-Brovarska Line adjoins the complex, constituting the station's main intersection with city transport. The Kyiv tram station Starovokzalna (the terminal of Kyiv's Right-Bank high-speed tram line) is also adjacent via a passageway.

== History and architecture ==
The old Kyiv railroad station was constructed from 1868 to 1870, as a part of Kyiv-Balta and Kyiv-Kursk railroad constructions, which were also completed in 1870. The station was located in a valley of Lybid’ river, replacing soldiers' and gendarmes' settlements. The two-floor brick station building of Old English Gothic style was by the architect М. V. Vyshnevetskyi.

The current Central Station building was constructed in 1927-1932 and designed by Oleksandr Verbytskyi. It was built in the style of Ukrainian Baroque with some elements of Constructivism. The Central Station building is designated as the Landmark of Architecture, numbered 193. The equipment and interior of the hall of deputies of the Supreme Council at the station was made by the architect Irma Karakis.

In 2001, the building was restored to roughly its original state, but with the previously displayed Communist symbols removed. In the same year, the new modern "Southern Station" building was erected at the opposite side of Central Station's sixteen tracks, being in reality not a separate station but merely another large entrance way to the Central Station, with new ticket windows and linked by a hallway above the track accesses. Both buildings are connected with an overpass for passengers. The renovation project also included two large underground parking structures, one of which remains uncompleted to date. The construction of the southern station building was done on the efforts of Heorhiy Kirpa.

In the Russo-Ukrainian war the building became a "Point of Invincibility".

== Name disambiguation ==
Officially, Kyiv-Pasazhyrskyi railway station is regarded as the whole huge complex of passenger terminals, railways, depots etc. with respective personnel. Practically, such installations in post-Soviet countries are widely known as railroad vokzals, which means the building(s) and services immediately serving passengers for various types of transport. The official name Kyiv-Pasazhyrskyi is not used colloquially, appearing only in tickets, schedules etc. By the same token, the locally popular terms "Central Station" and "Southern Station" do not appear in such technical literature, as for internal purposes they are treated as the same location.

The name Kyiv-Pasazhyrskyi (literally Kyiv Passenger) is also used to differentiate it from other railway stations across the city such as Kyiv-Volynskyi, Kyiv-Demiivskyi, Kyiv-Tovarnyi, and others.

== Development plans ==
Currently, the station is severely overloaded with suburban traffic, intercity traffic (especially during the height of winter and summer holidays), and also subway traffic (in daily rush hours). Relief plans include:

- Upgrading Darnytsia station to make it a second long-distance passenger station, serving the Left-Bank of the city (including new sleeping car maintenance facility.)
- Construction of a second surface entrance for the Vokzalna metro station, which is currently the most overloaded station of the metro system.
- Extension of the Podilsko-Vyhurivska Metro Line, which is now under construction on the banks of Dnipro river, to the Vokzalna metro station.
- Moving the Starovokzalna tram station closer in order to make it more accessible and extending the tram line which now serves only the northwestern districts into the city center

== Trains and destinations ==
=== International Routes ===
Train number	Destination	Operated by
067К/068Л	(Poland) Warsaw (Centralna)	(Ukraine) Ukrainian Railways
081Д/8862	(Slovakia) Košice	(Ukraine) Ukrainian Railways
117П/380Л	(Romania) Bucharest (North)	(Ukraine) Ukrainian Railways
351Щ/352Щ 353Ф/354Ф	(Moldova) Revaca (for the Chișinău Airport) (via Ungheni & Chișinău )	(Ukraine) Ukrainian Railways
705К/705Л; 715К/715Л	(Poland) Przemyśl	(Ukraine) Ukrainian Railways
749Д/6302	(Poland) Wrocław	(Poland) PKP (Ukraine) Ukrainian Railways
40147/40749	(Austria) Vienna (Hauptbahnhof)	(Austria) ÖBB

=== Former international routes ===
Train number	Destination	Operated by
005Я/006К	(Russia) Moscow (Kiyevsky)	(Ukraine) Ukrainian Railways
023М/024Ш	(Russia) Moscow (Kiyevsky) (Ukraine) Odesa	(Ukraine) Ukrainian Railways
031К/031Р	(Latvia) Riga	(Belarus) Belarusian Railways (Ukraine) Ukrainian Railways
047Щ/047Ь; 065М/066Щ; 341Ф/341Ь	(Russia) Moscow (Kiyevsky) (Moldova) Chișinău (via Tiraspol)	(Moldova) Moldovan Railways
053А/054К	(Russia) Saint Petersburg (Vitebsky)	(Ukraine) Ukrainian Railways
073А/074Л	(Russia) Moscow (Kiyevsky) (Ukraine) Lviv	(Ukraine) Ukrainian Railways
086Б/086К	(Belarus) Minsk	(Belarus) Belarusian Railways
094Б/094Ш	(Belarus) Minsk (Ukraine) Odesa	(Ukraine) Ukrainian Railways
369Щ/370К	(Azerbaijan) Baku	Azerbaijan Railways

All international rail services to/from Russia, Belarus, Transnistria, Latvia, and Azerbaijan have been suspended indefinitely after the Russian invasion of Ukraine in 2022. It is uncertain if any rail services between Russia and Ukraine (including transit services to/from Moldova and Azerbaijan) will resume in the foreseeable future, even after the end of the armed conflict.

== Photos ==
=== Historic photos ===
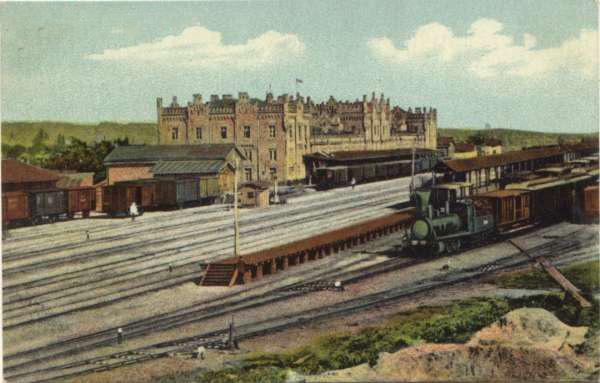
The former two-platform brick station building of Old English Gothic style in the 19th century

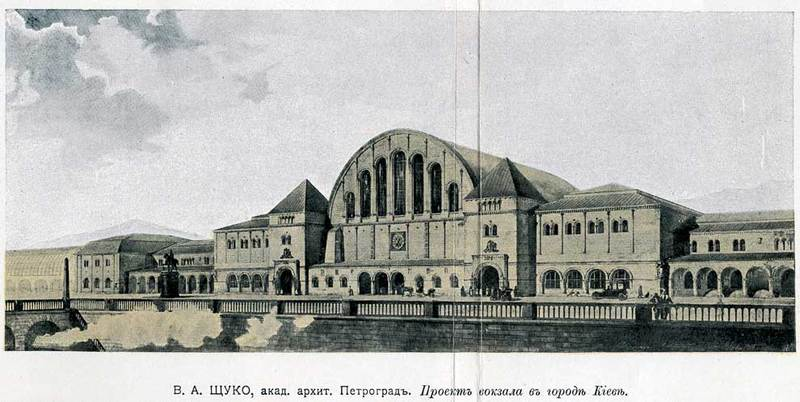
One of the drafts of main station building

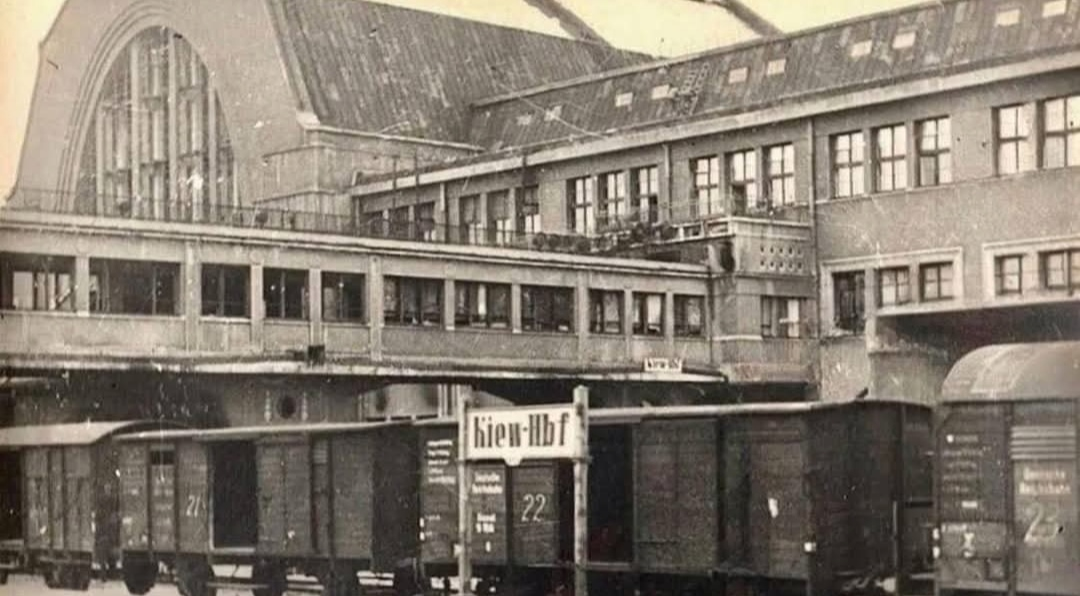
Station building during the Second World War, with German signage

=== Modern terminals ===
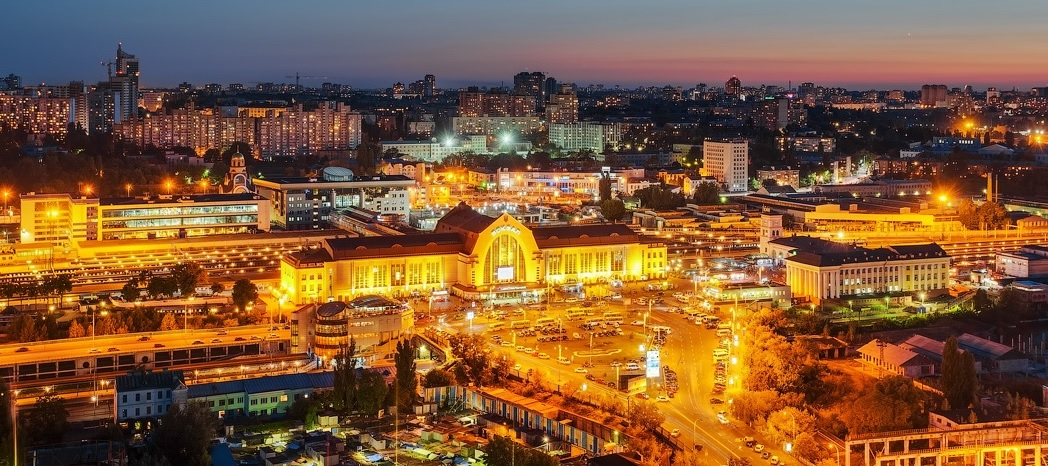
View on the station complex at night

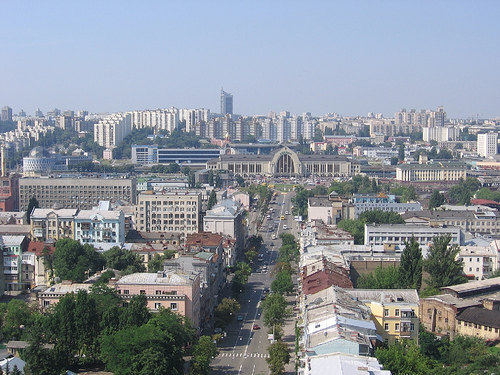
Symon Petliura Street leading to the main station building

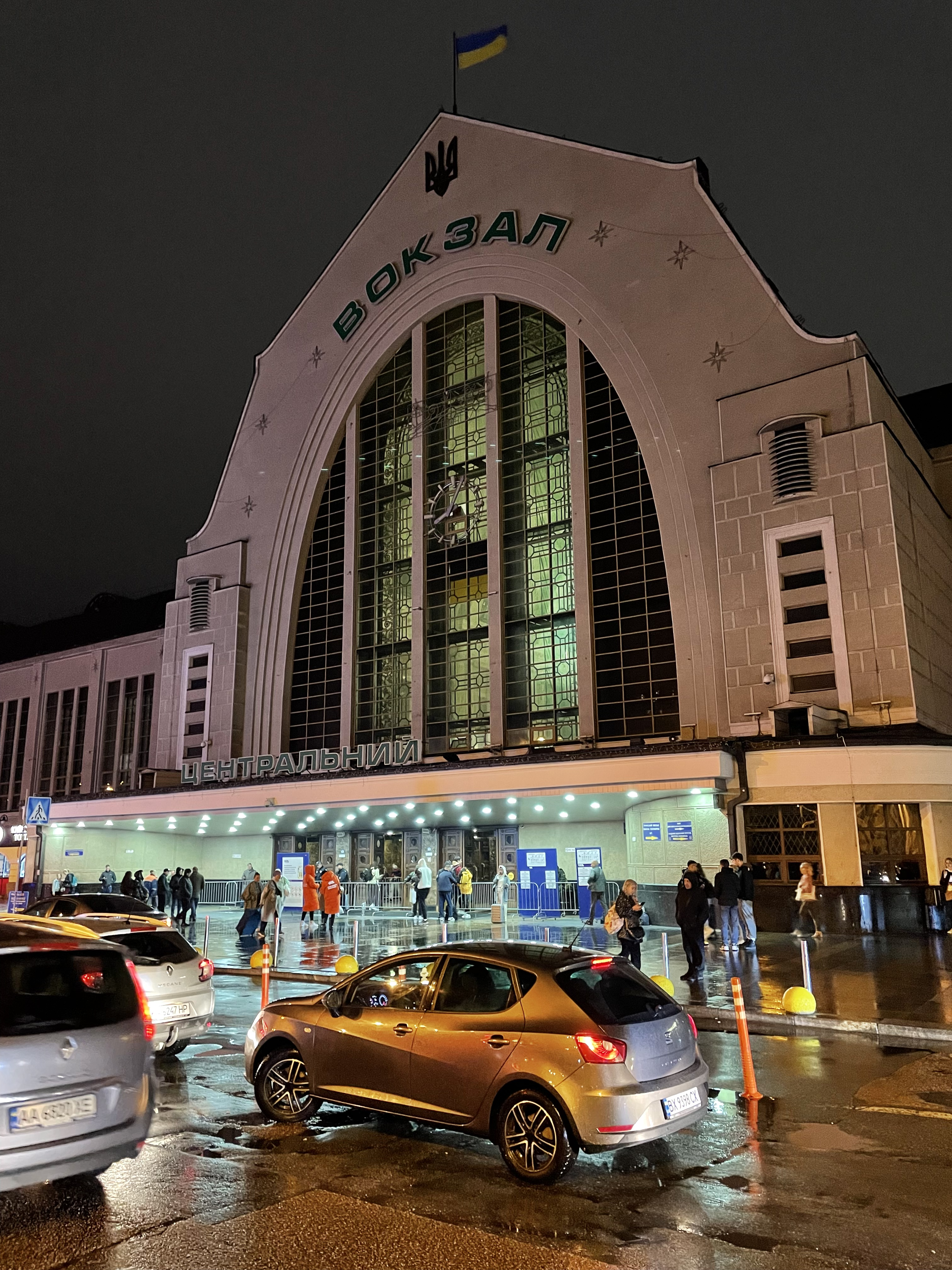
Entrance of the main terminal

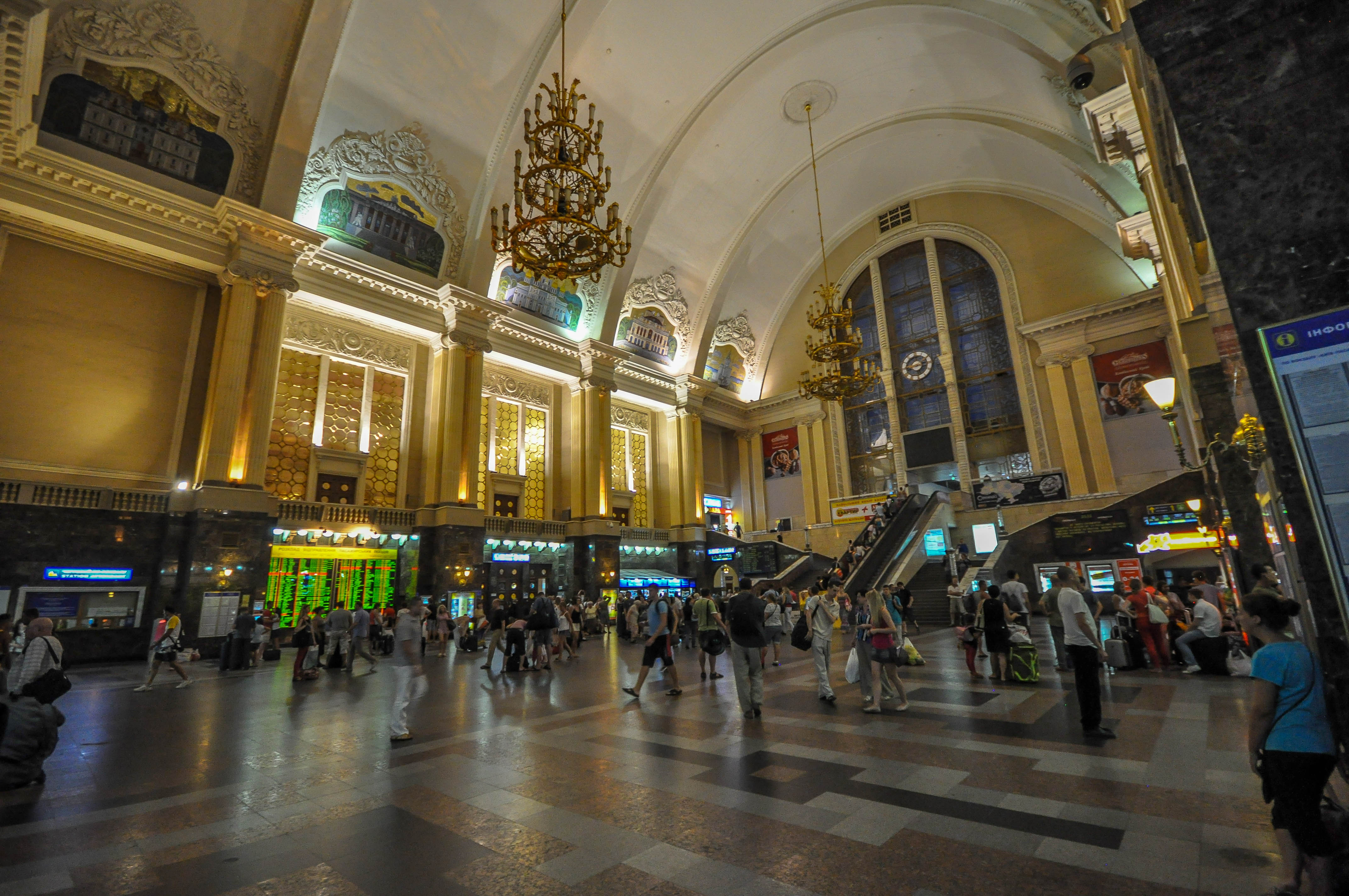
Station hall interior

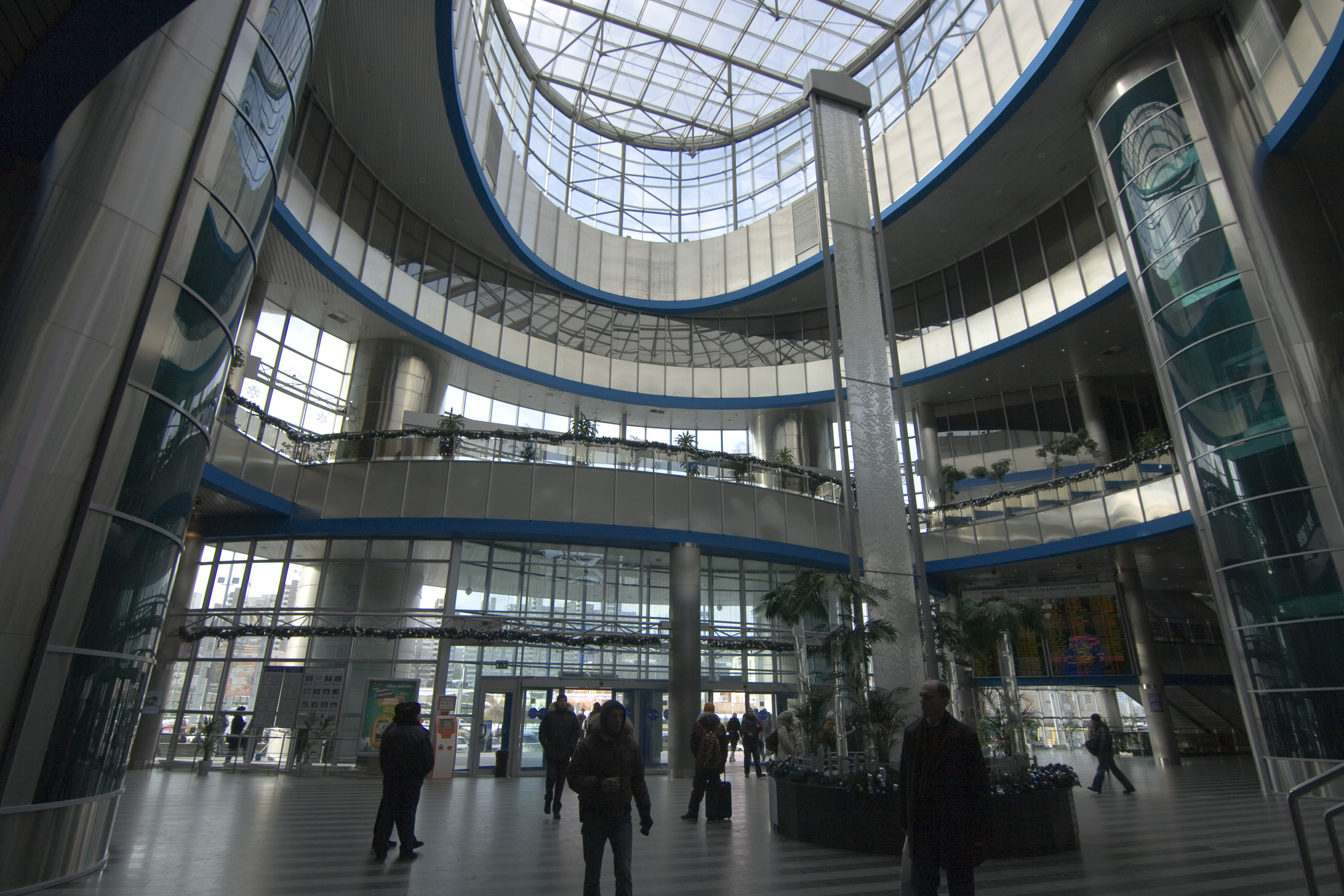
Interior of the new terminal ("Southern Station")

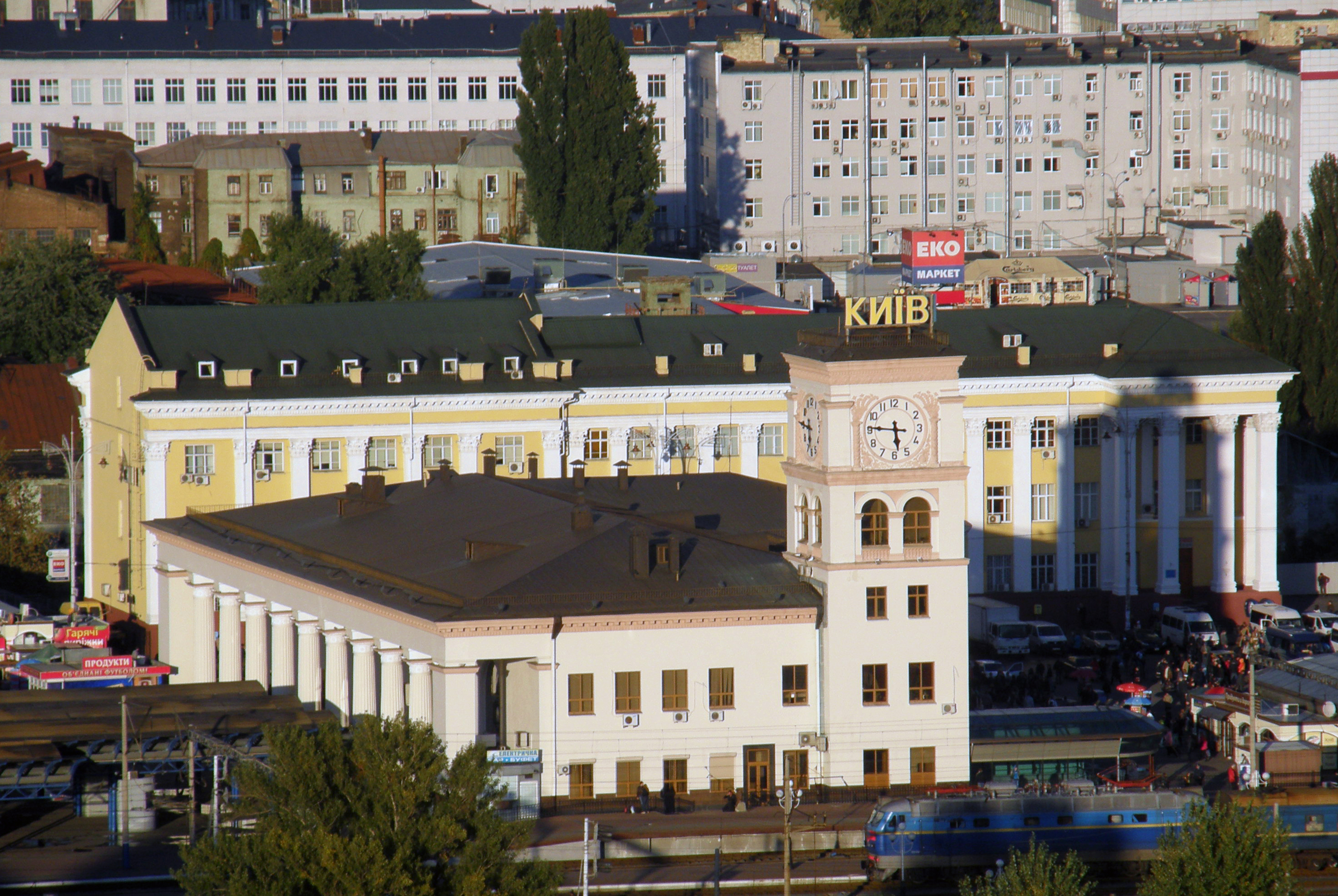
Suburban station building

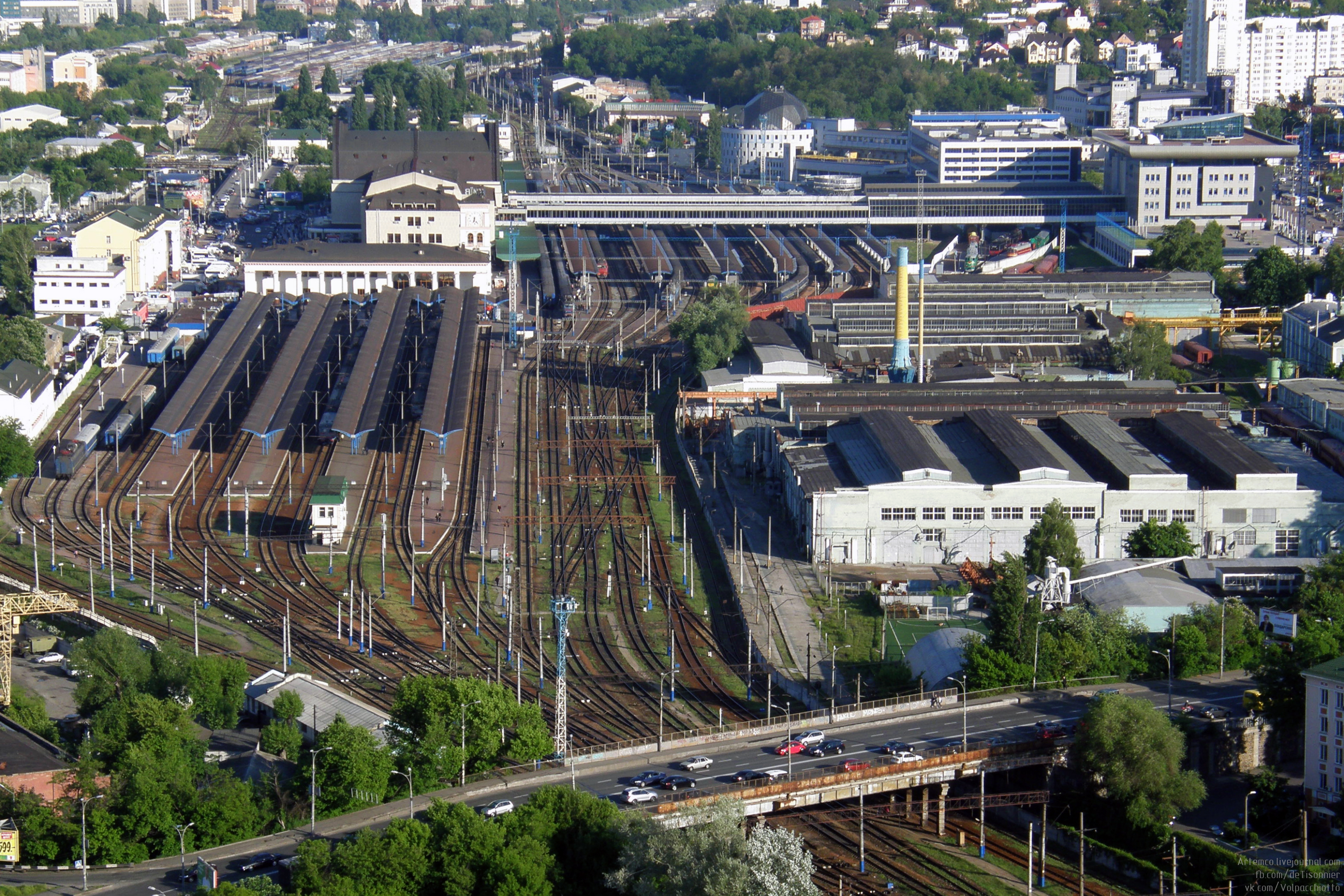
Panorama of the station complex with suburban station on the left, main terminal in the background and southern terminal on the right.

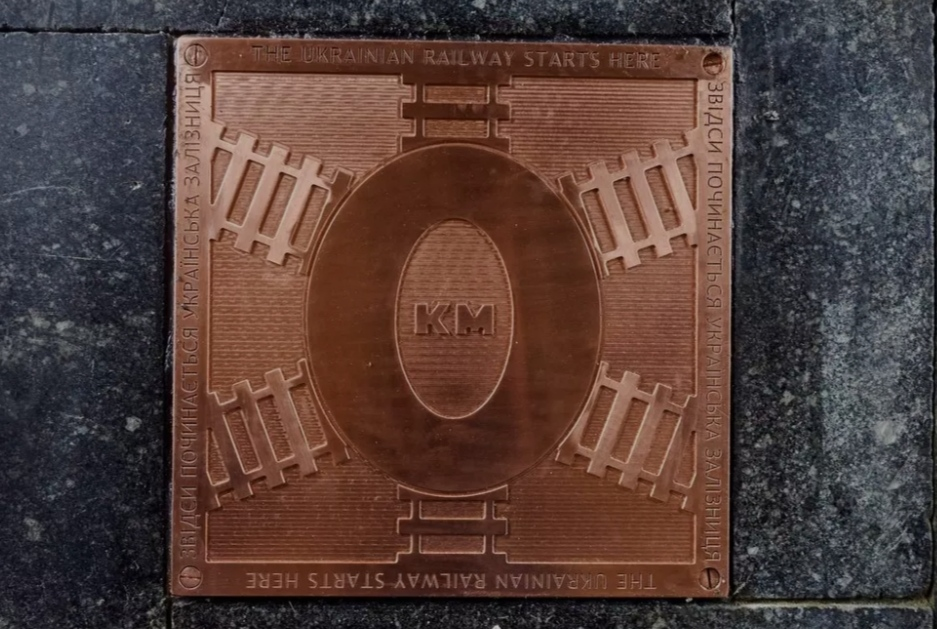
"Zero Kilometre" sign inside of the station

=== Adjacent structures ===
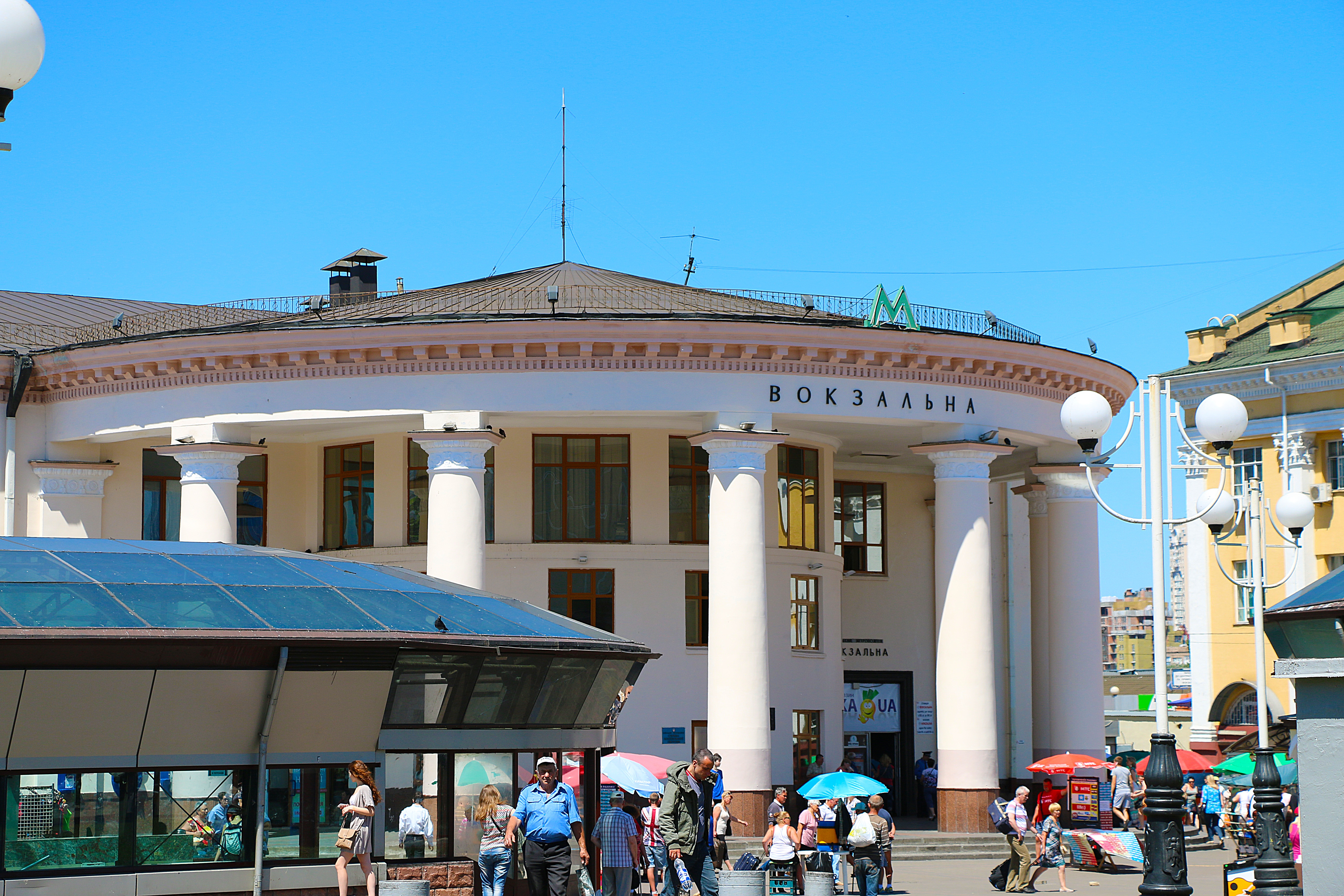
Entrance of Vokzalna metro station

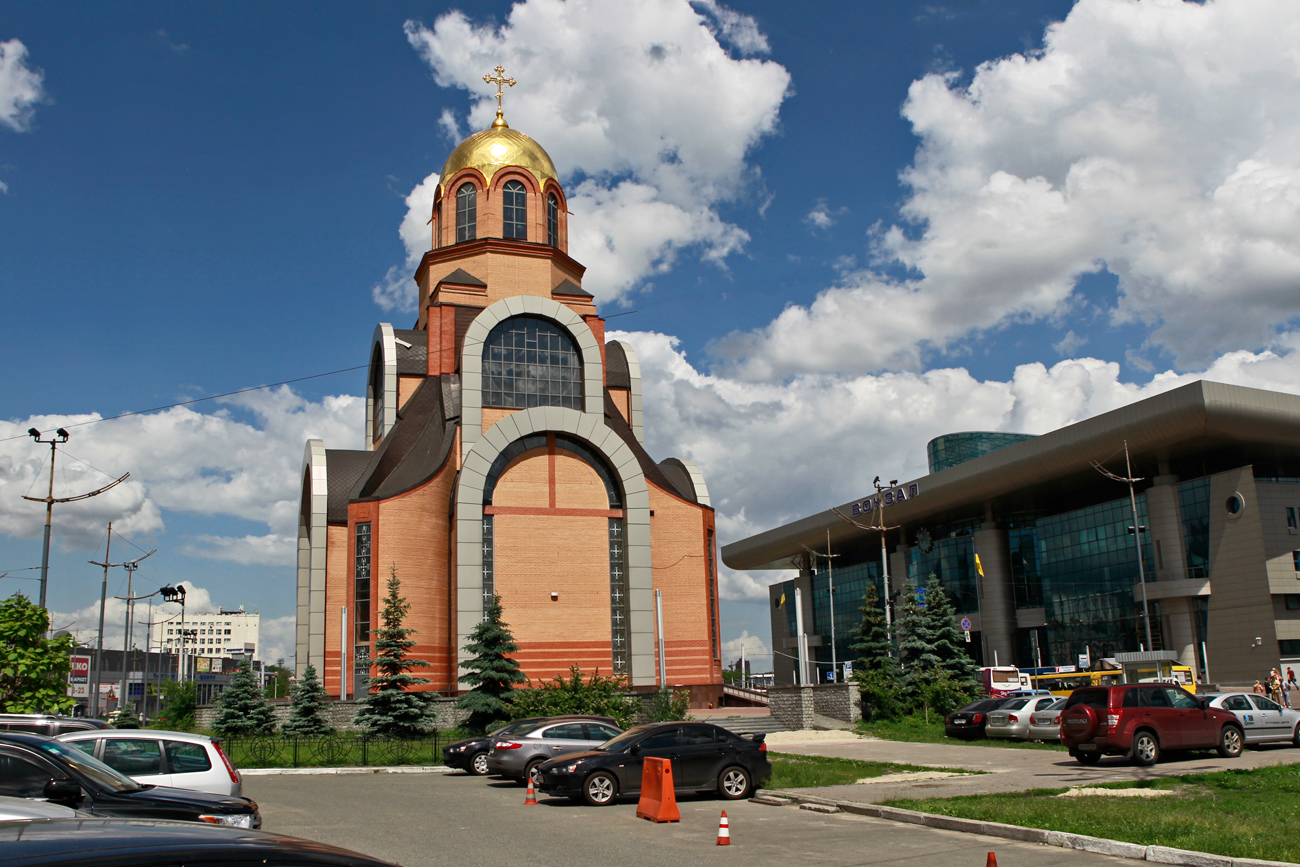
Saint George's Church in front of the southern station building

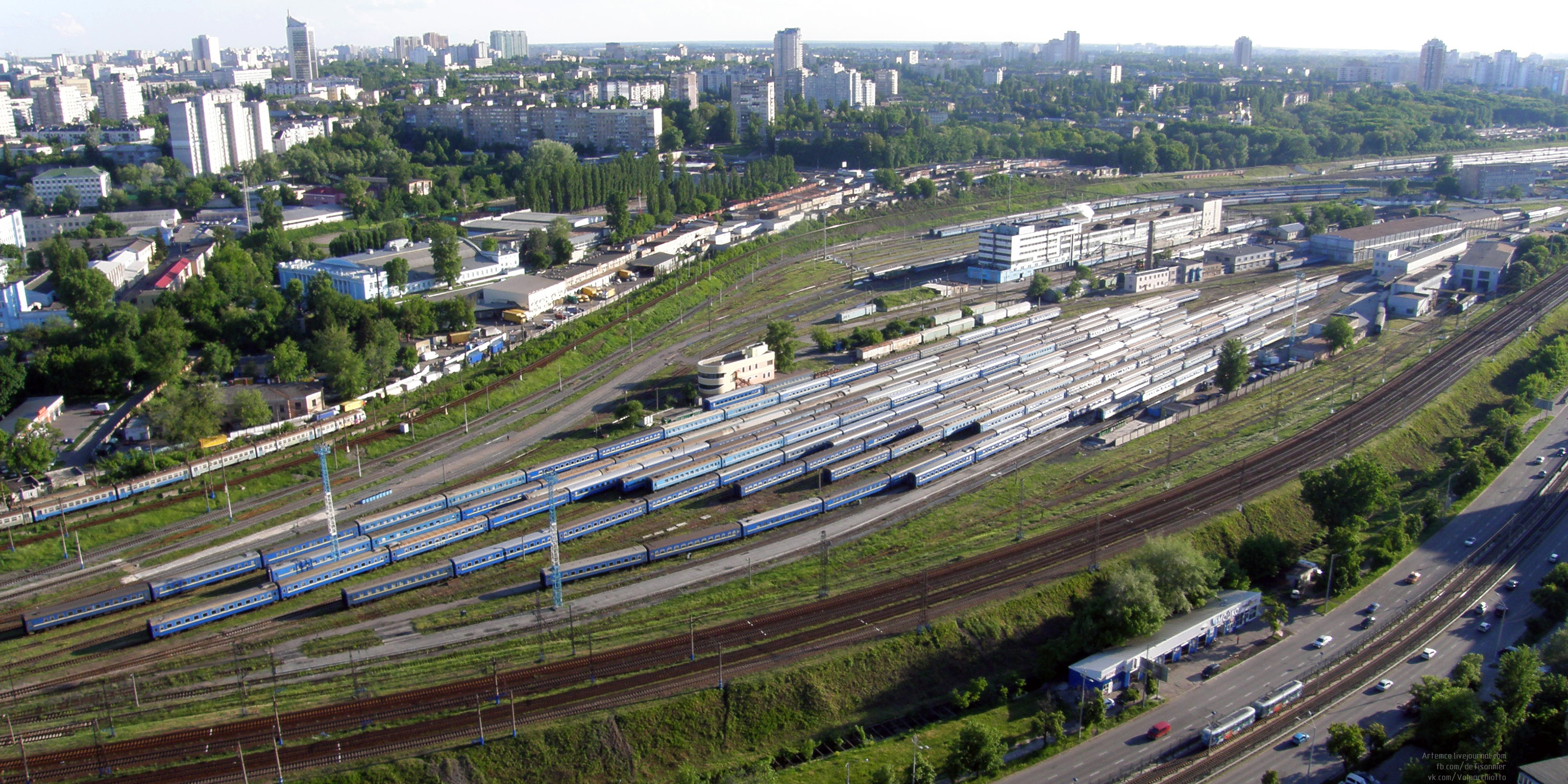
The adjacent railyard, intended to sort out and combine railcars

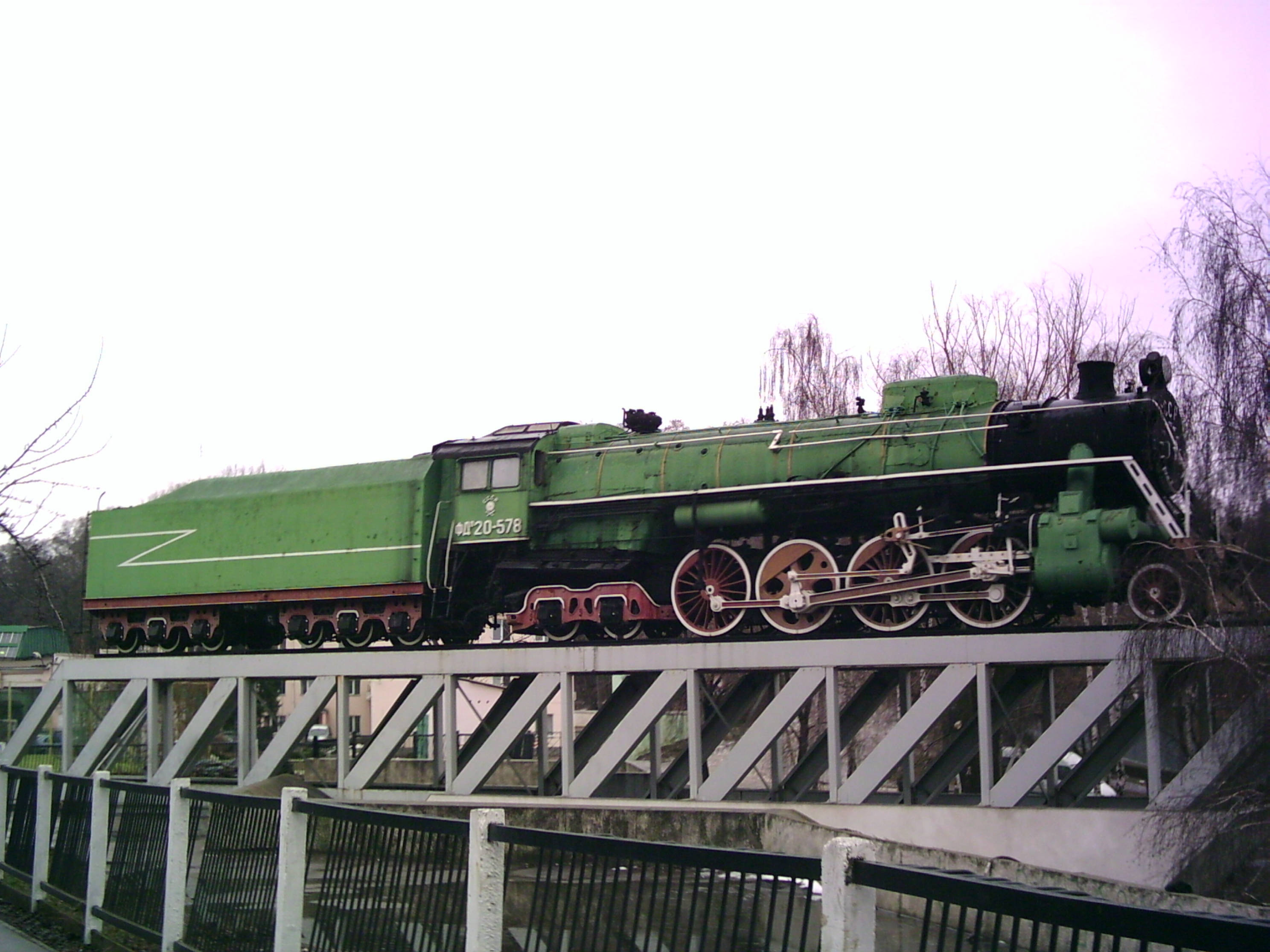
Railwaymen monument

== See also ==
- Ukrzaliznytsia - the national railway company of Ukraine
