= Kyiv Urban Electric Train =

Passenger train service in Kyiv, Ukraine

Kyiv City Express

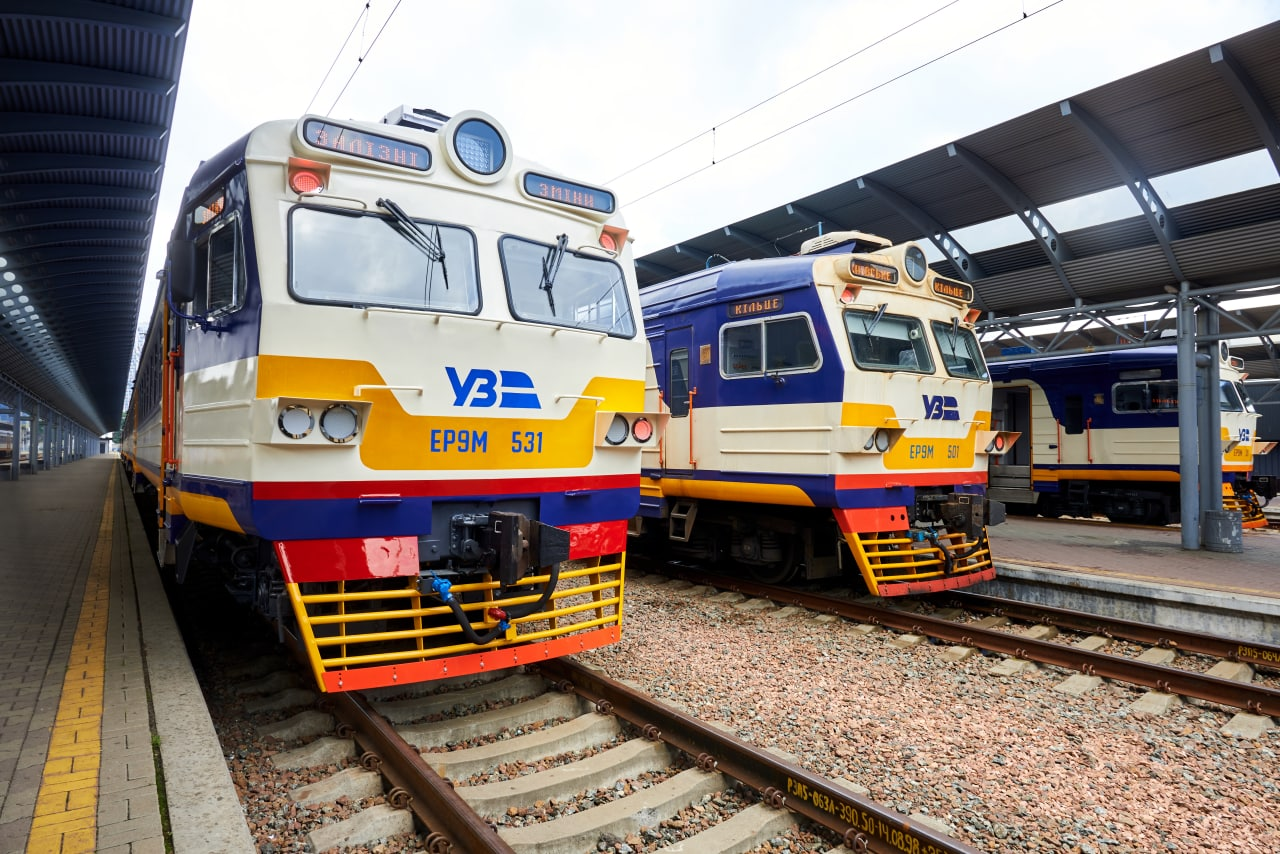

Overview
- Locale: Kyiv, Ukraine
- Transit type: Urban Rail
- Number of lines: 1
- Number of stations: 15
- Daily ridership: 1,608,000
- Website: kyivcityexpress.uz.gov.ua

Operation
- Began operation: September 2, 2009
- Operator: Ukrainian Railways

Technical
- System length: 50.8 km (31.6 mi)
- Electrification: overhead lines

The Kyiv Urban Electric Train (Ukrainian: Київська міська електричка, romanized: Kyivska miska elektrychka, IPA: [ˈkɪjiu̯sʲkɐ miˈsʲkɑ elekˈtrɪtʃkɐ]), officially known as the Kyiv City Express, is an urban rail transit passenger service in Kyiv, Ukraine. Since 2022, the service is operated by Ukrainian Railways. The project uses a long-existing railroad ring in the city for peak hour circulation of electric multiple unit trains.

Working 2 since September 2009 Kyiv Urban Electric Train is the first instance of a combined municipal railway service and an intracity passenger rail route in Ukraine, and arguably in the former Soviet Union as a whole.

The ring was fully completed on 4 October 2011, the full length of lines is 50.8 km with 15 stations. Opening hours are from 5:48 until 21:37 with a time between trains of between 10 and 30 minutes. 12 trains operate on the line; the fastest time to complete a loop is 1 hour and 25 minutes. A train ticket costs ₴15.

With the beginning of the Russian invasion on February 24, 2022, the operation of the city electric train was suspended, later resumed on March 21, 2022, on the route from Darnytsia to Sviatoshyn, and from March 27 on the whole loop, including new stations: Mykilska Slobidka, Kyiv-Demiivskyi, Protasiv Yar and Rusanivka.

== Name ==
The project intentionally uses the colloquial Ukrainian term electrychka ("electric train") as its official name. This reflects the essence of the service, which is provided with exactly the same rolling stock and railway personnel that are used for the conventional electrychka commuter rail since Soviet rule.

Another name, kiltseve metro (a Kyiv "ring metro") was sometimes used, but never became official or widespread.

== Infrastructure ==
All the railroad infrastructure the Kyiv Urban Electric Train utilizes already existed in the city and is shared with other services of the Ukrzaliznytsia (both passenger and freight). However, not all of the Kyiv's rail stations and halts are served by the project.

The trains depart from and arrive to the dedicated terminus platform at the Darnytsia station, thus making a circle on the Kyiv ring railroad through the Kyiv-Pasazhyrskyi station. However, not all of the trains commence full circle: some early and last runs start or terminate at the Kyiv-Volynskyi station. Passengers are advised to consult with the schedule and pay attention to the on-platform audio announcements.

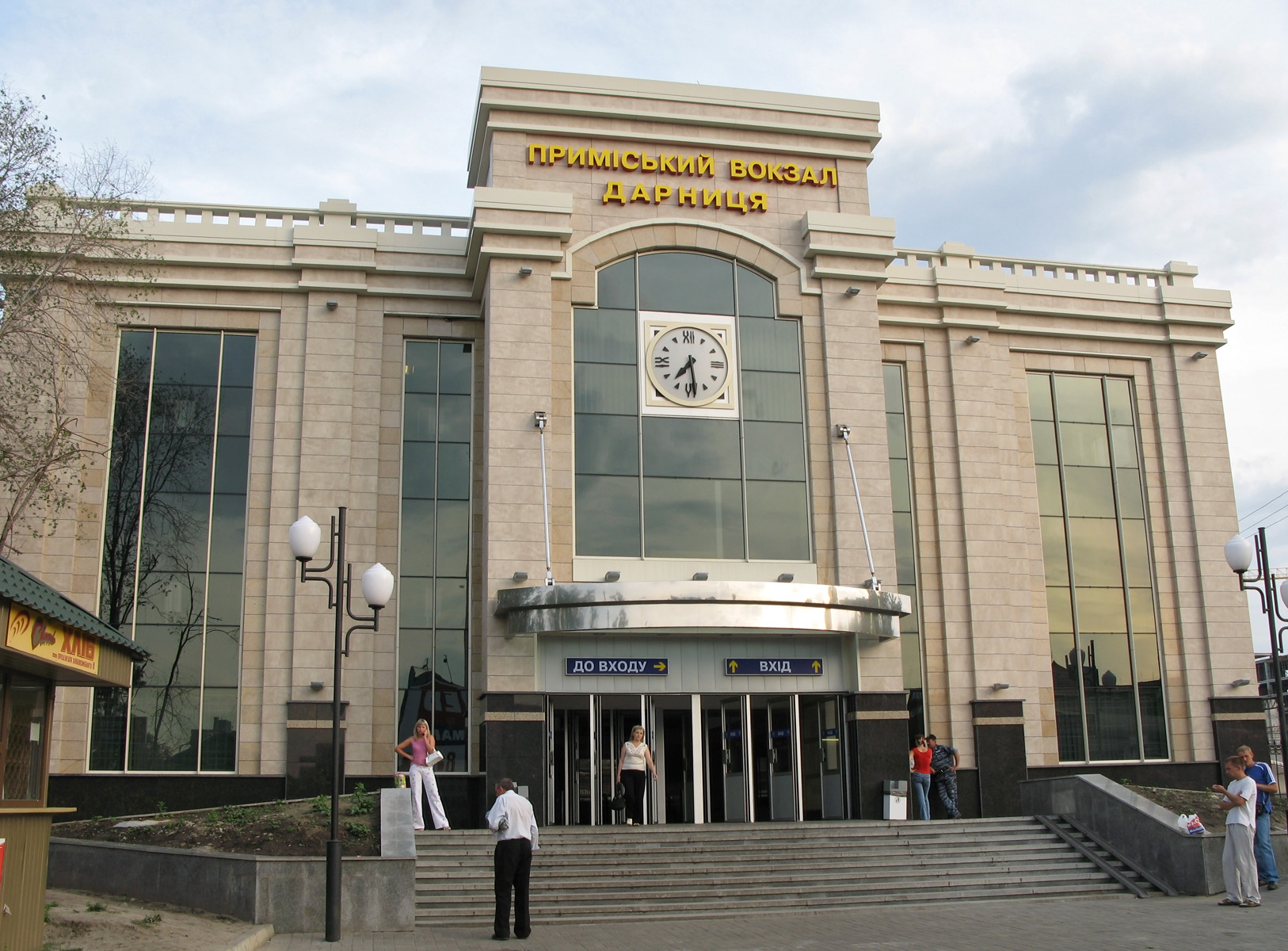
Northern platform at Darnytsia

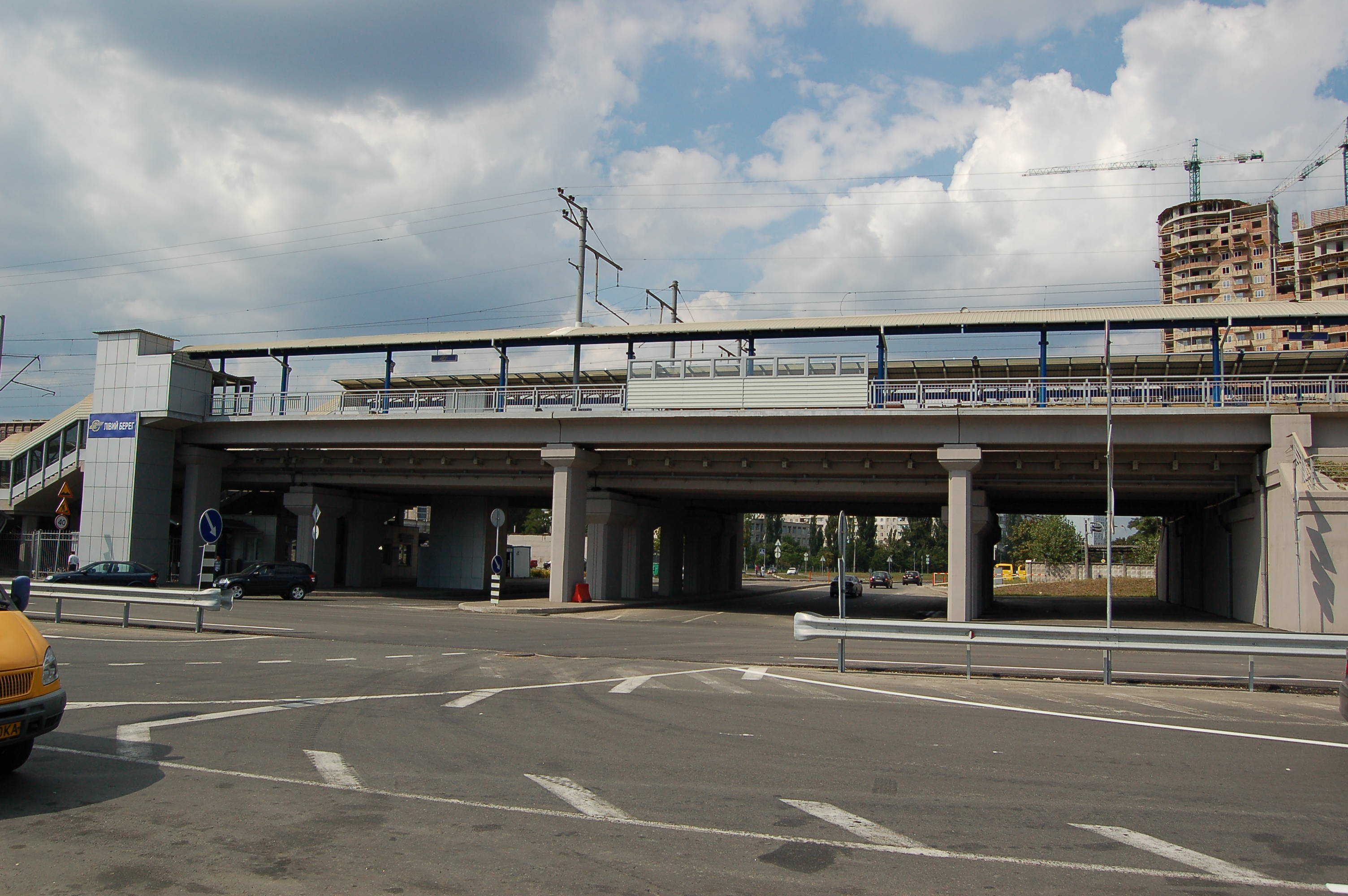
Berezniaky is one of the newest passenger stations in the city

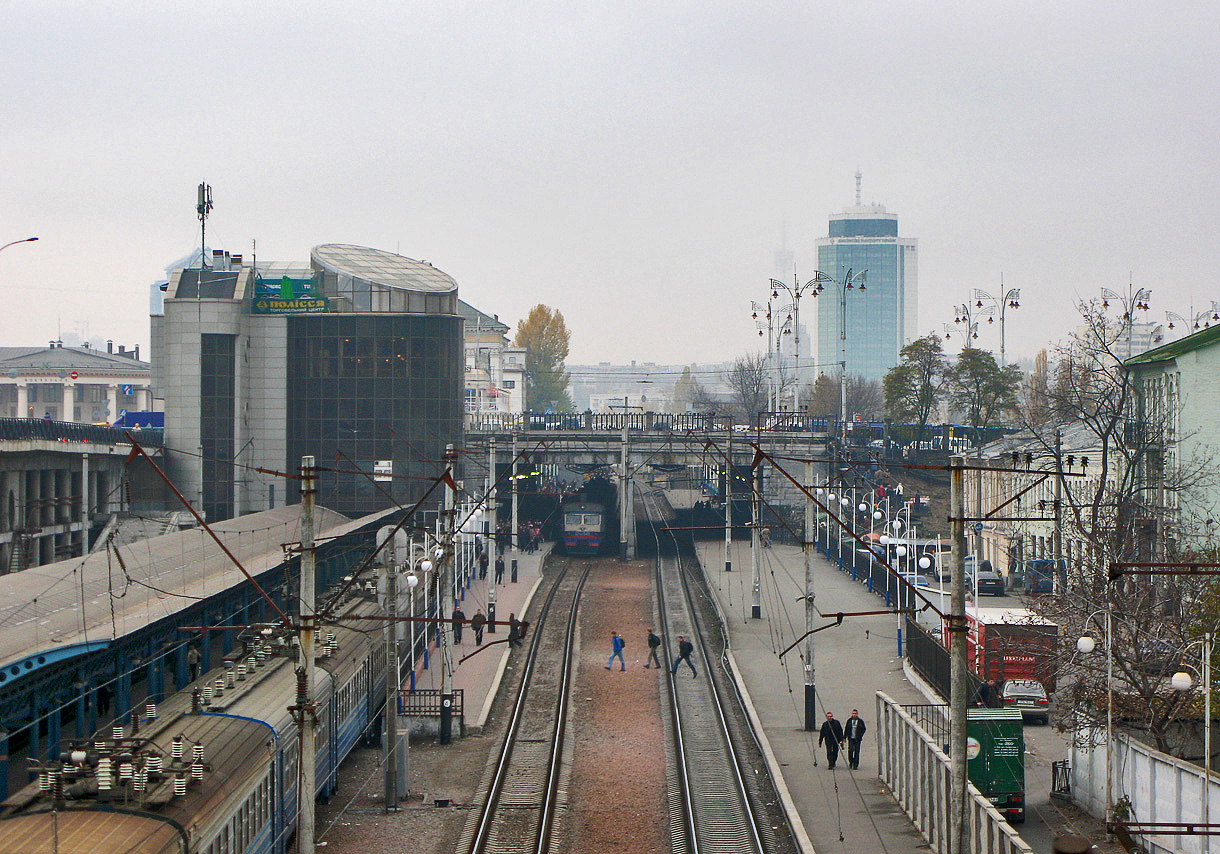
Vokzalna is used by the suburban and urban trains

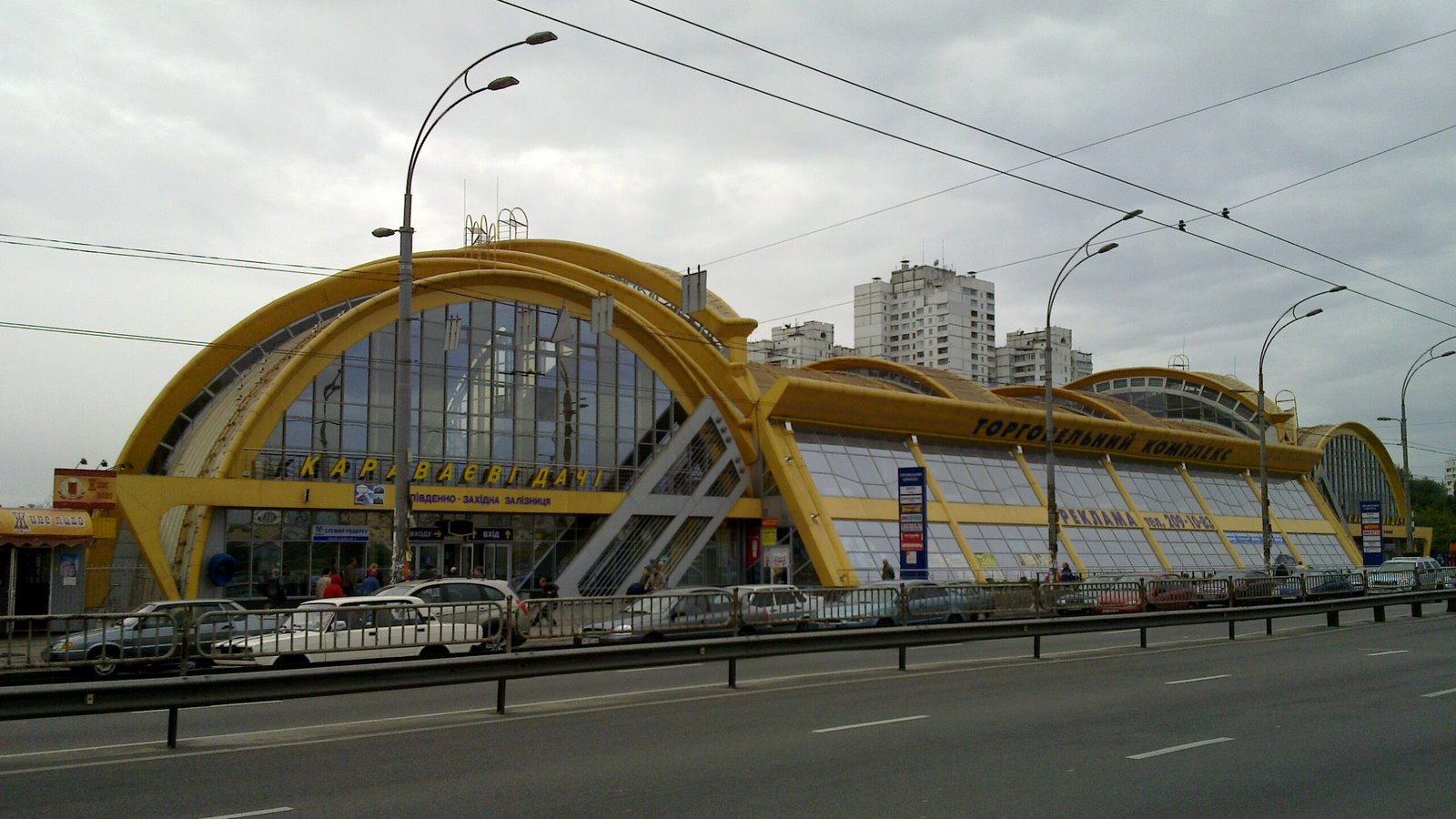
Modern on-bridge terminal building at Karavaievi Dachi

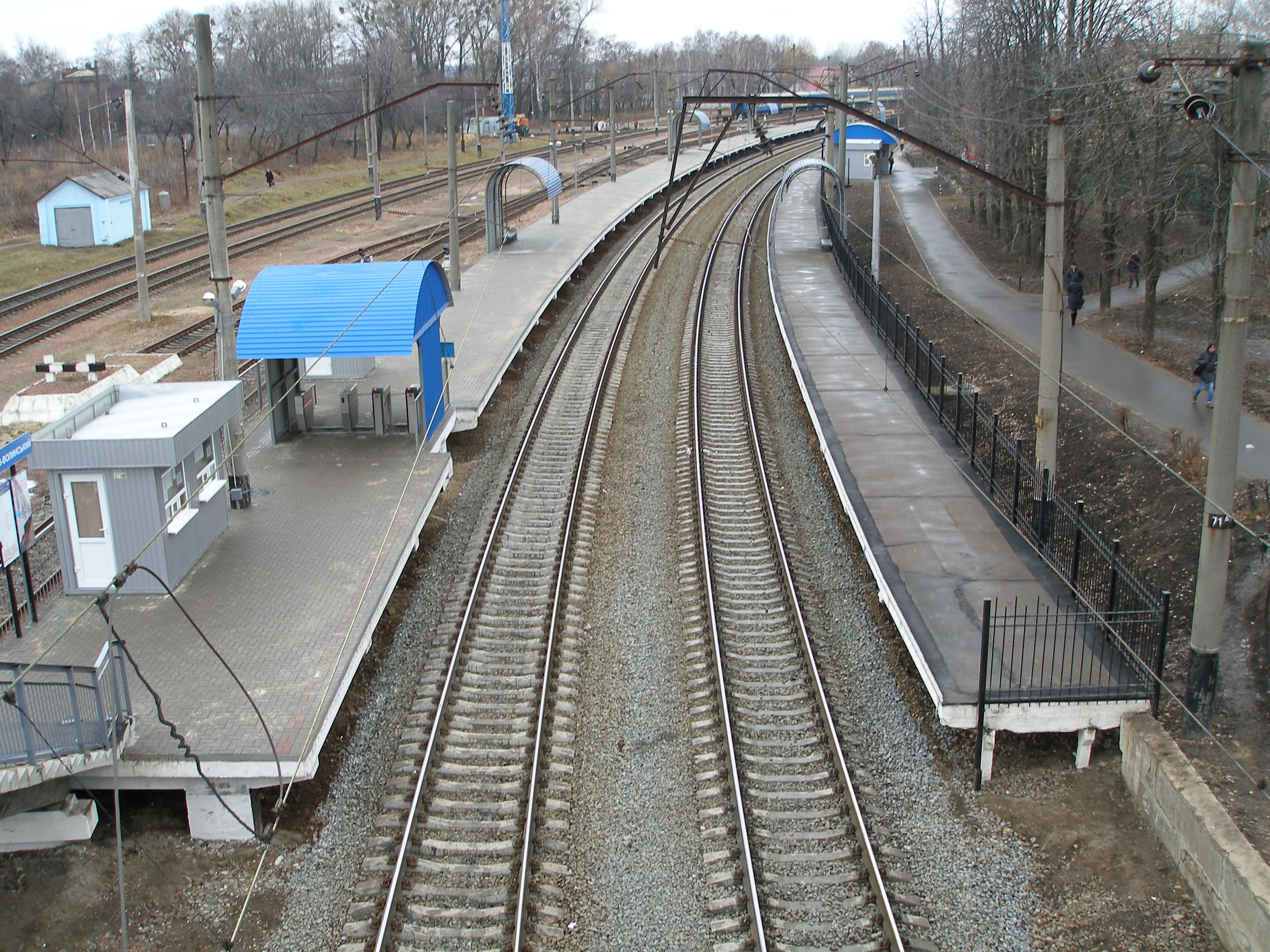
Northwest-bound passenger platforms at Kyiv-Volynskyi with ticket box and turnstiles

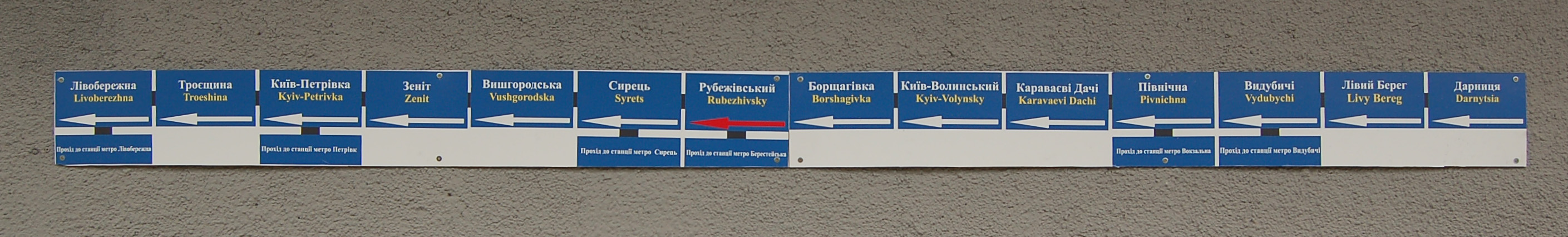
Urban service route scheme at Beresteiska

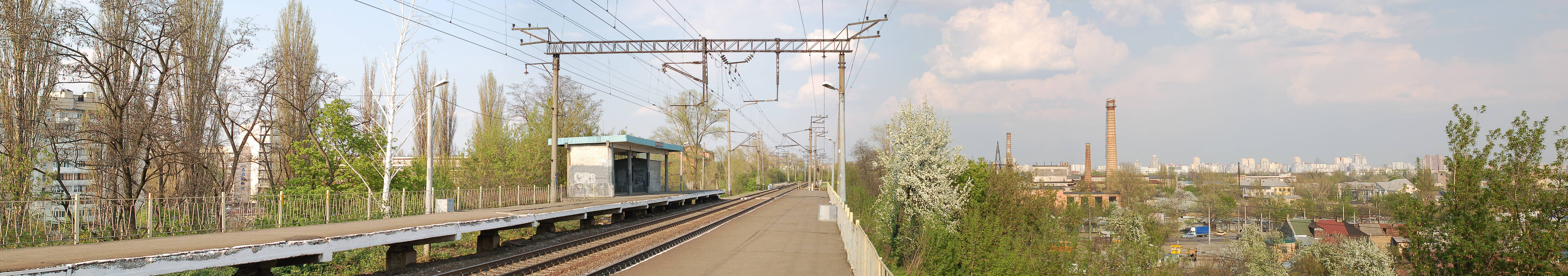
Priorka is built on a high embankment, offering a panoramic view of Podil

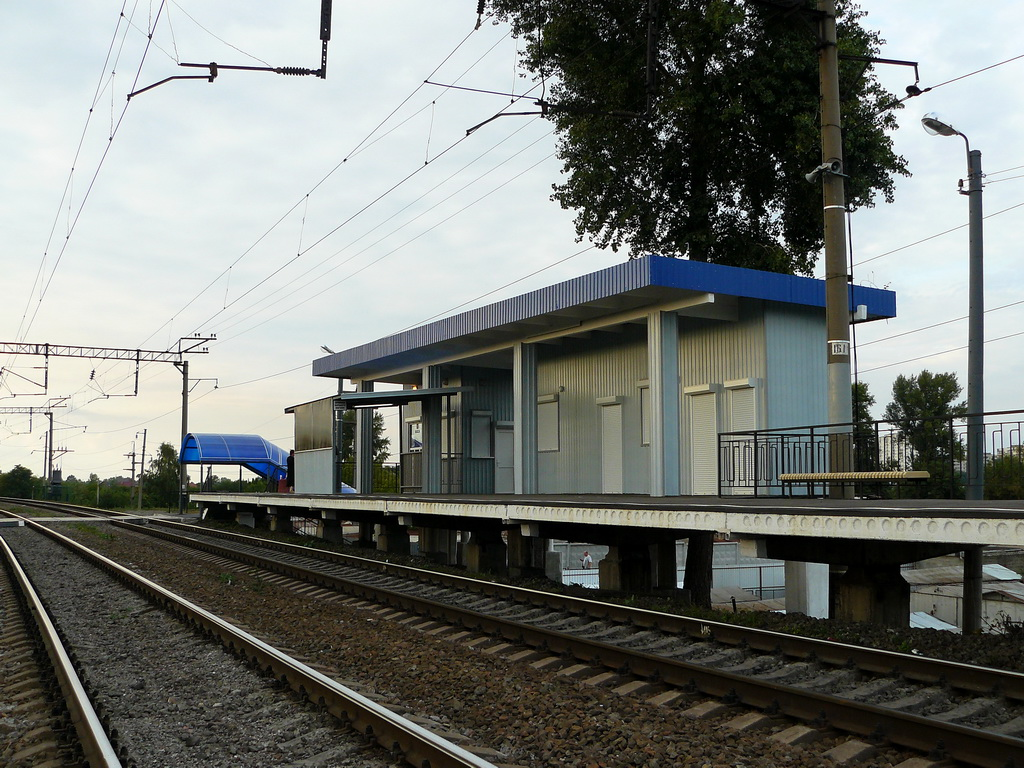
Voskresenka is one of the few stations purposely built for the new service

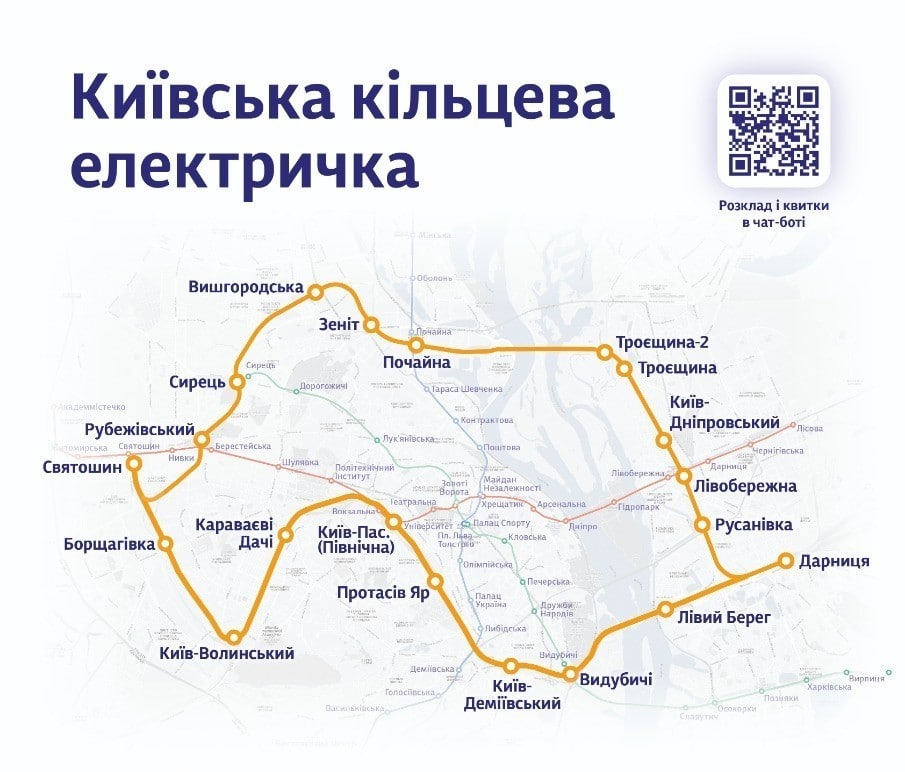
System map

== Connections with other public transport ==
Kyiv Urban Electric Train is designed as a mean of transporting passengers to- and from the Kyiv Metro stations and major public transport routes. Thus, all stops for the moment are essentially multimodal transfer hubs.

== Rolling stock ==
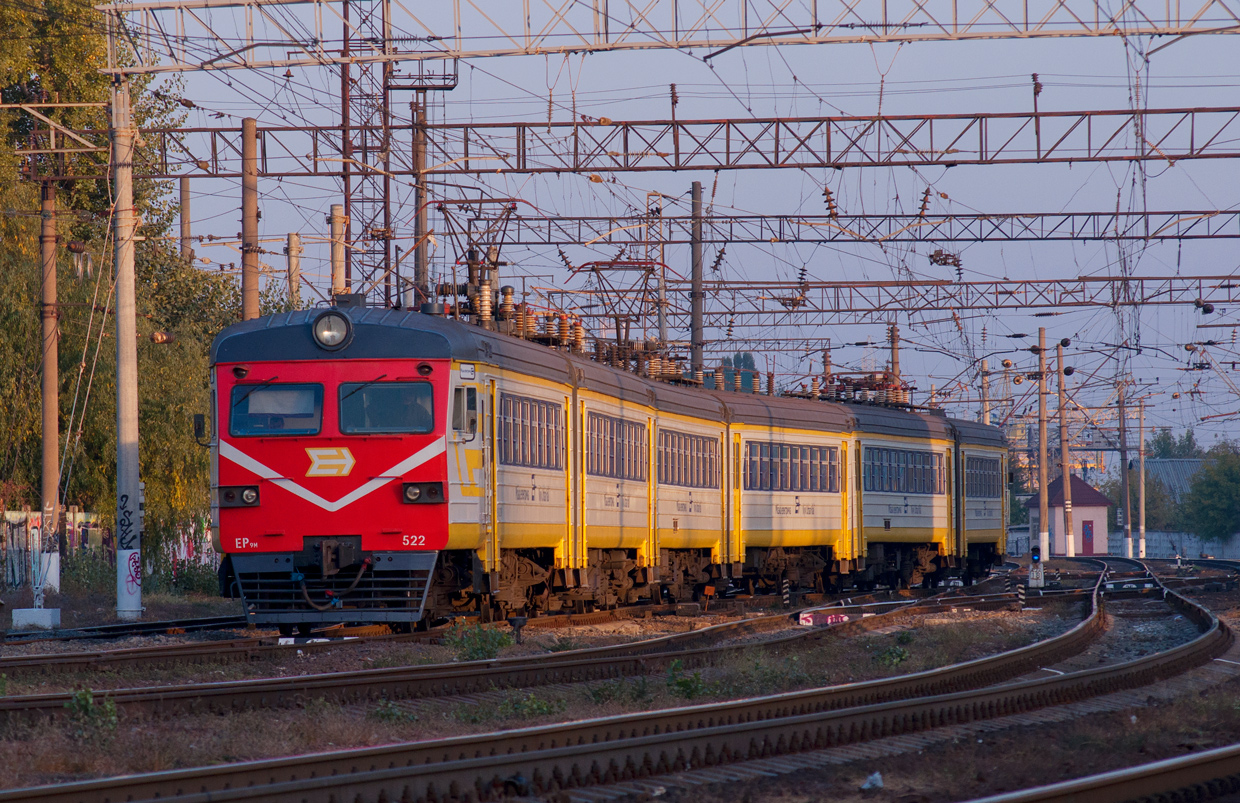
Urban service RVR ER9M-522 trainset in a new Kyiv Urban train livery

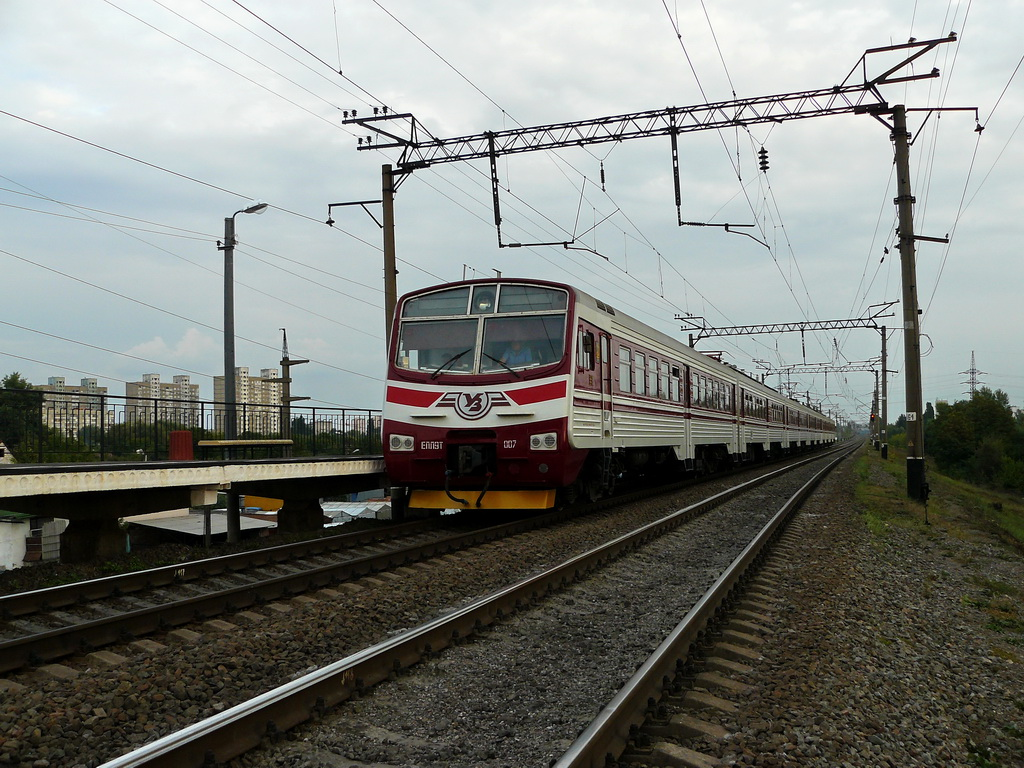
Urban service Luhanskteplovoz EPL9T-007 trainset in an old Ukrzaliznytsia livery

Urban service Luhanskteplovoz EPL9T-005 trainset in a new Ukrzaliznytsia livery

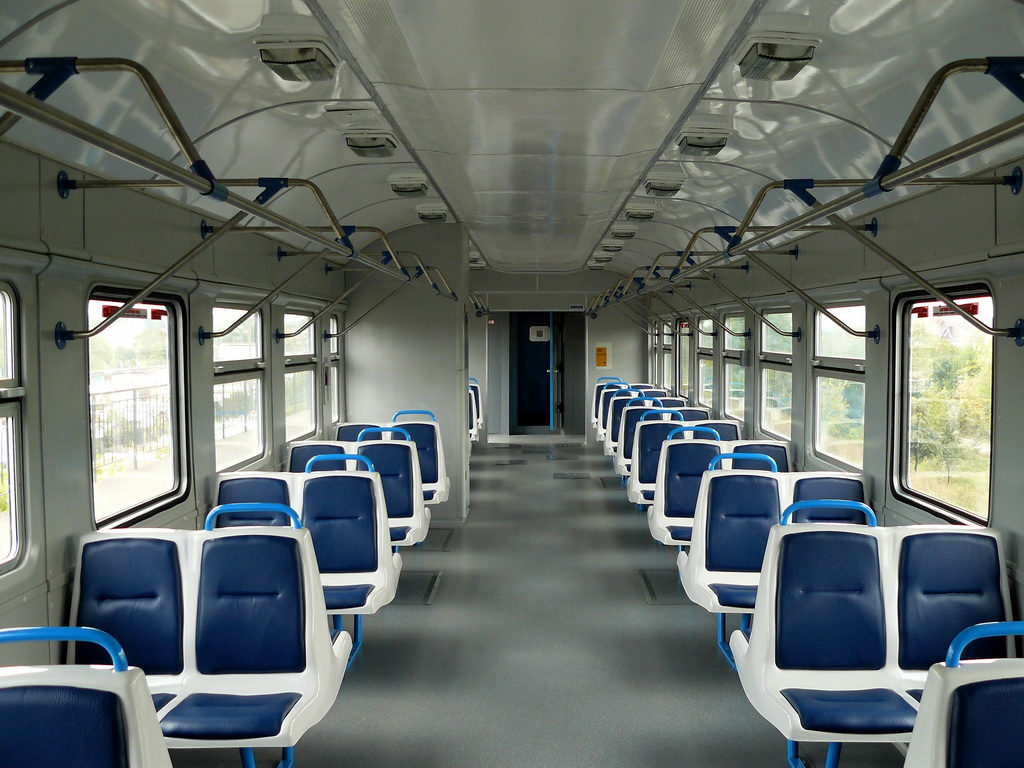
Interior view of an ER9M EMU converted for use as a Kyiv Urban Electric Train

== Similar railroads ==
- Yamanote Line
- Osaka Loop Line
- Moscow Central Circle
- Berlin Ringbahn
