= Darnytsia railway station =

Railway station in Kyiv, Ukraine

Darnytsia Дарниця
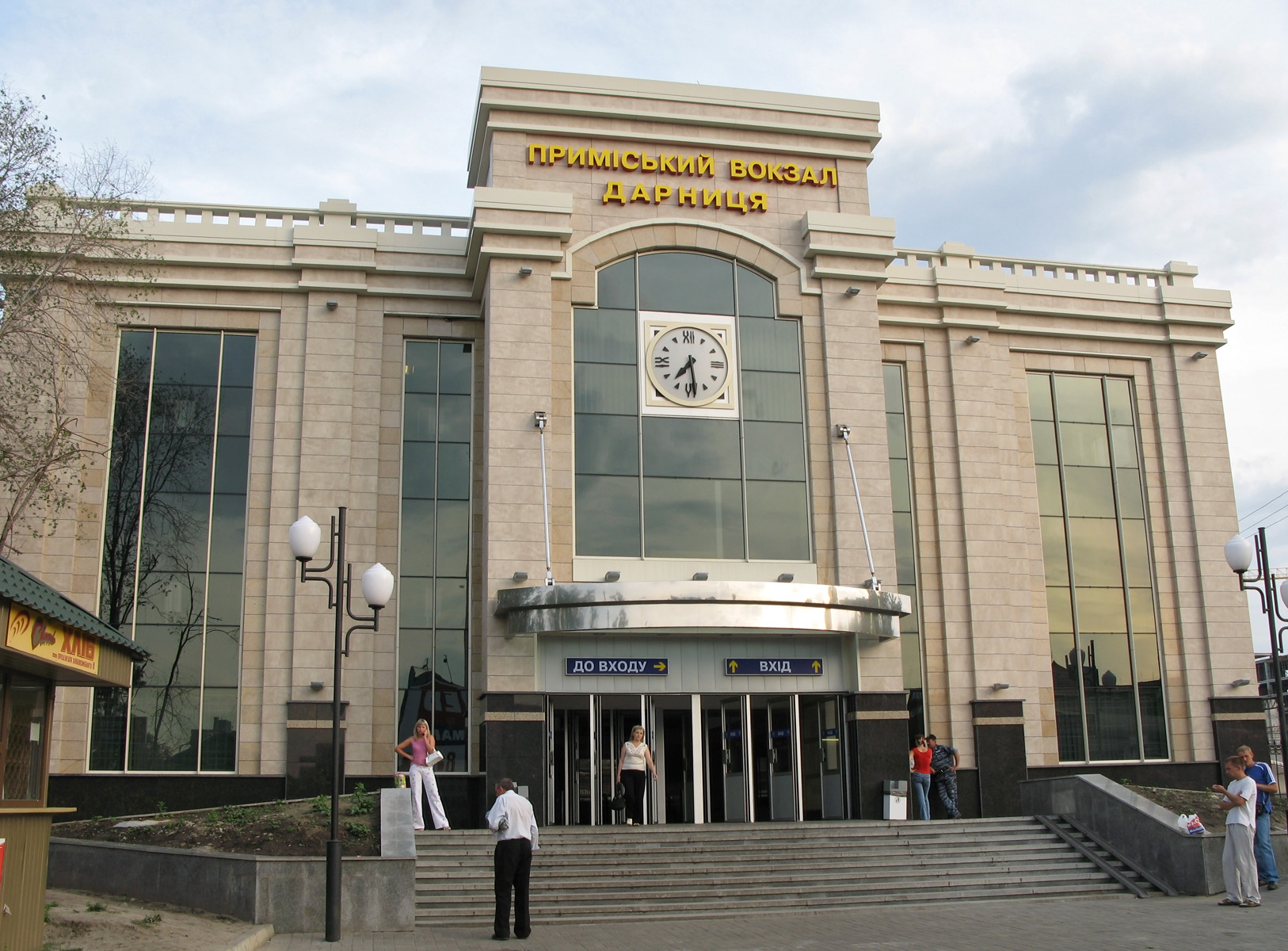
- Commuter terminal

General information
- Location: 3 Pryvokzalna St., Kyiv; Ukraine
- Coordinates: 50°25′52″N 30°38′46″E
- Owner: Ukrzaliznytsia
- Platforms: 1 bay platform + 2 island platforms (+3 island platforms under construction)
- Connections: tram, marshrutka, metro (planned)

Construction
- Structure type: at-grade
- Parking: limited, under construction
- Cycle facilities: allowed

History
- Opened: 1899
- Rebuilt: 1953, expansion continuing from 2003
- Electrified: 1957

Services
Preceding station	Ukrainian Railways	Following station
Berezniaky	Southwestern Railways	Kyiv-Lisky
Berezniaky	Southwestern Railways	Darnytsia-Depot
Berezniaky	Southwestern Railways	Farmatsevtychna
Vydubychi toward Kyiv-Pasazhyrskyi	Kyiv Boryspil Express	Boryspil Airport Terminus
Rusanivka toward Darnytsia	Kyiv City Express	Terminus
Berezniaky toward Darnytsia	Kyiv City Express	Terminus
Location

Darnytsia (Ukrainian: Дарниця) is the largest Ukrainian Railways station (and the main freight station) of the Ukrainian capital Kyiv, located in the city's Left-bank Darnytsia neighborhood.

Built in the nineteenth century, the Darnytsia railway hub has grown into a gigantic railway center, expanding for more than 10 km along the main east–west route. Started in 2004, construction is under way at the new Darnytsia railway terminal complex. When finished, the station will serve long-distance passenger trains, house own station of the Kyiv metropolitan, a two-storey car parking, a tunnel for automobile and tram traffic. The complex is meant to become Kyiv's second long-distance terminal, easing the traffic tension in the main Kyiv Passenger railway station.

== Infrastructure ==
The Darnytsia hub comprises: several sorting yards, hump yard, commuter passenger terminal and two additional train stops, locomotive and railcar depots, Darnytsia Railcar Repair Factory railcar repair company, numerous industrial sidings.

== Passenger service ==
=== Commuter service ===
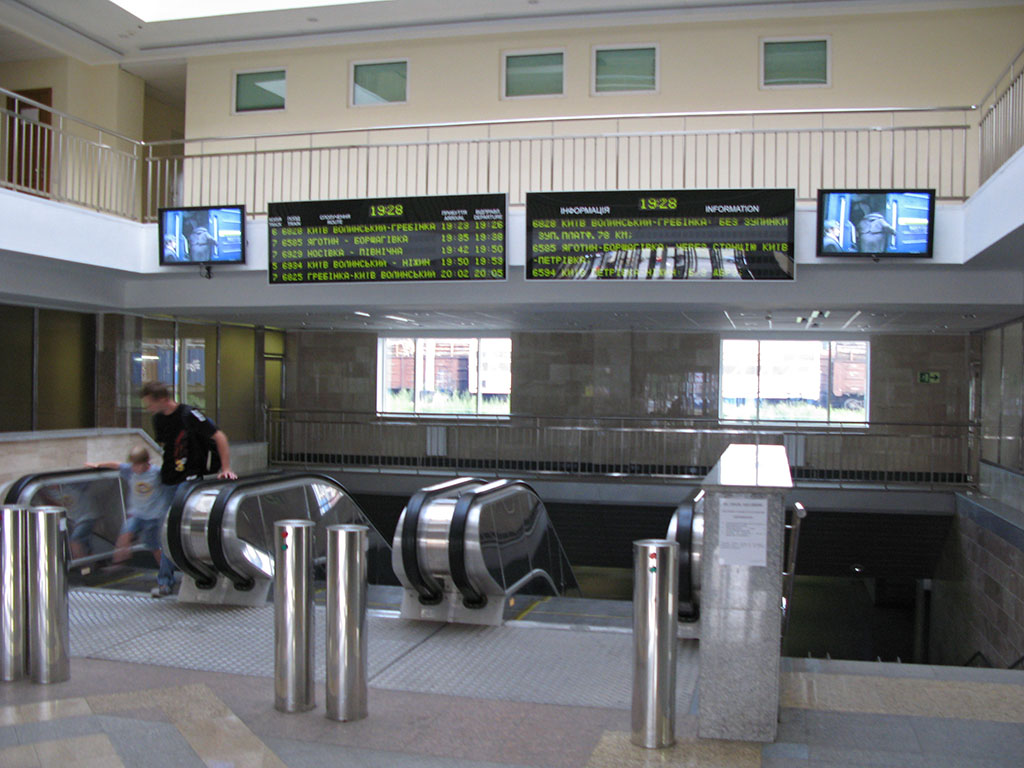
Interior of the existing passenger terminal (the southern one) at Darnytsia.

On 16 February 2007, the renovated commuter train terminal (pair of mirroring opposite buildings) of the station opened to the public.

Commuter and intra-city directions from Darnytsia: Hrebinka, Nizhyn, central terminal (intra-city), Petrivka Railway Station (Kyiv) (intra-city).

On 30 November 2018, the Kyiv Boryspil Express high-speed train service linking Boryspil International Airport and Kyiv-Pasazhyrskyi was launched, which stops at Darnytsia station.

=== Long-distance service ===
Currently, most long-distance trains pass through Darnytsia non-stop; none of them originates or terminates at the station. However, the ticket boxes in the commuter terminals sell tickets for all long-distance routes in Ukraine.

== Interconnections with city transport ==
In 2011, Darnytsia station became the terminus for the new intracity circle rail service called "Urban Electric Train". Trains for both circle directions arrive at Darnytsia and change heads.

Kyiv tram, buses and marshrutkas are connected to Darnytsia station, but they are not up to needs even for the existing commuter passenger flow.

The railway station is not yet interconnected with the city's rapid transit system, Kyiv Metro. The Darnytsia Metro station is situated well away, despite sharing precisely the same name.

Connection to other city transport is to be improved, including through the Kyiv Metro, which is planned to be linked via enlargement of the Syretsko–Pecherska line.

== Railway hub ==
Besides the passenger terminal, Darnytsia train station also has its own locomotive and railcar depots. In addition to the east of Darnytsia railway hub is located Darnytsia Railcar Repair Factory (DVRZ) which is a major railcar repair factory of the Ukrzaliznytsia.

Darnytsia locomotive depot is specialized in maintaining and repair of ChME3 locomotives.

== Prospects of future expansion ==
Since 2012, Ukrzaliznytsia gradually increases the number of long-distance passenger trains that stop for Darnytsia in order to relieve the Kyiv Passenger railway station and prevent some of the passenger flow from crossing the overloaded city bridges

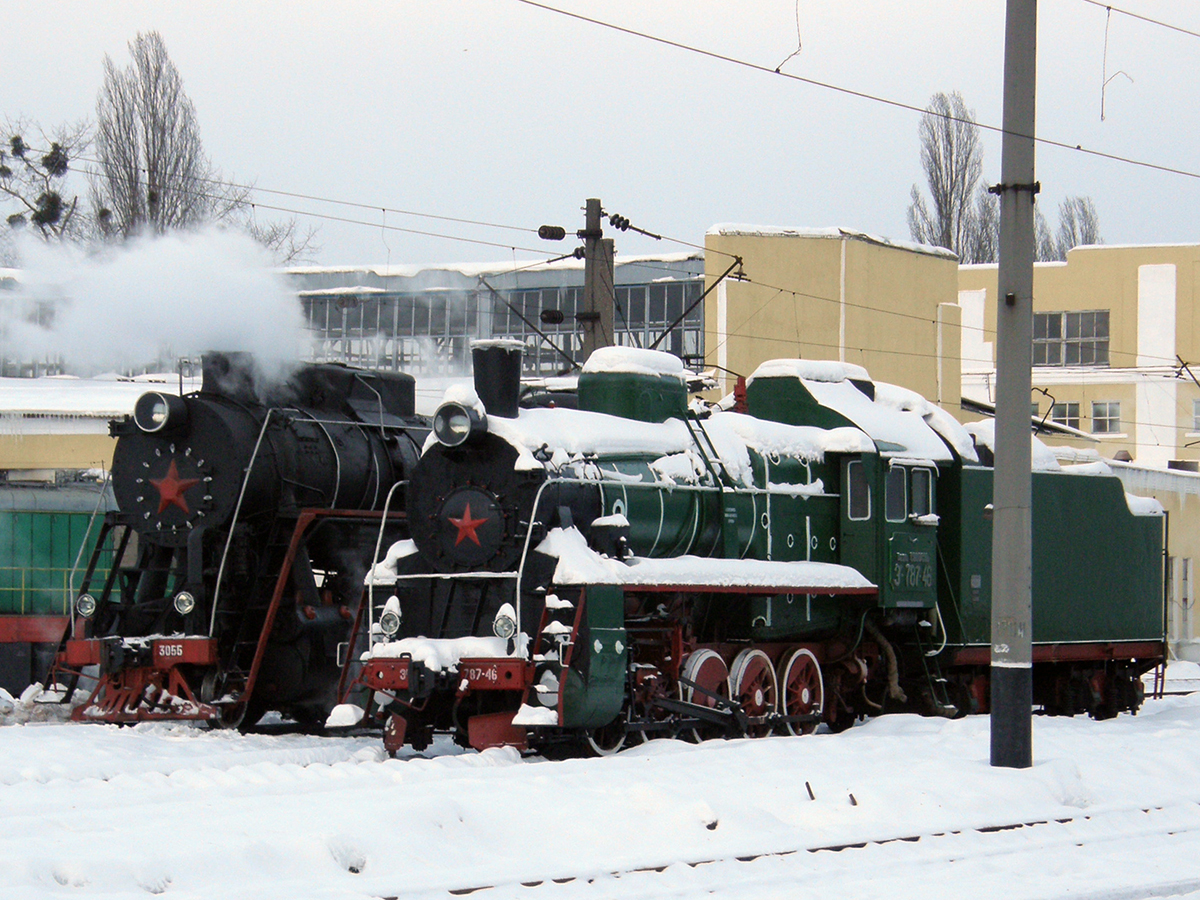
Steam locomotives at the Darnytsia locomotive depot

Darnytsia Station will also harbor a dedicated depot for Hyundai Rotem high-speed trains that are being launched by the Ukrzaliznytsia in 2012.

== See also ==
- Ukrzaliznytsia - the national railways company of Ukraine
- Darnytsia Railcar Repairing Plant
