= Southwestern Railways =

State-owned railway company in Ukraine

Southwestern Railways Південно-Західна залізниця
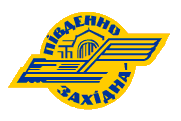

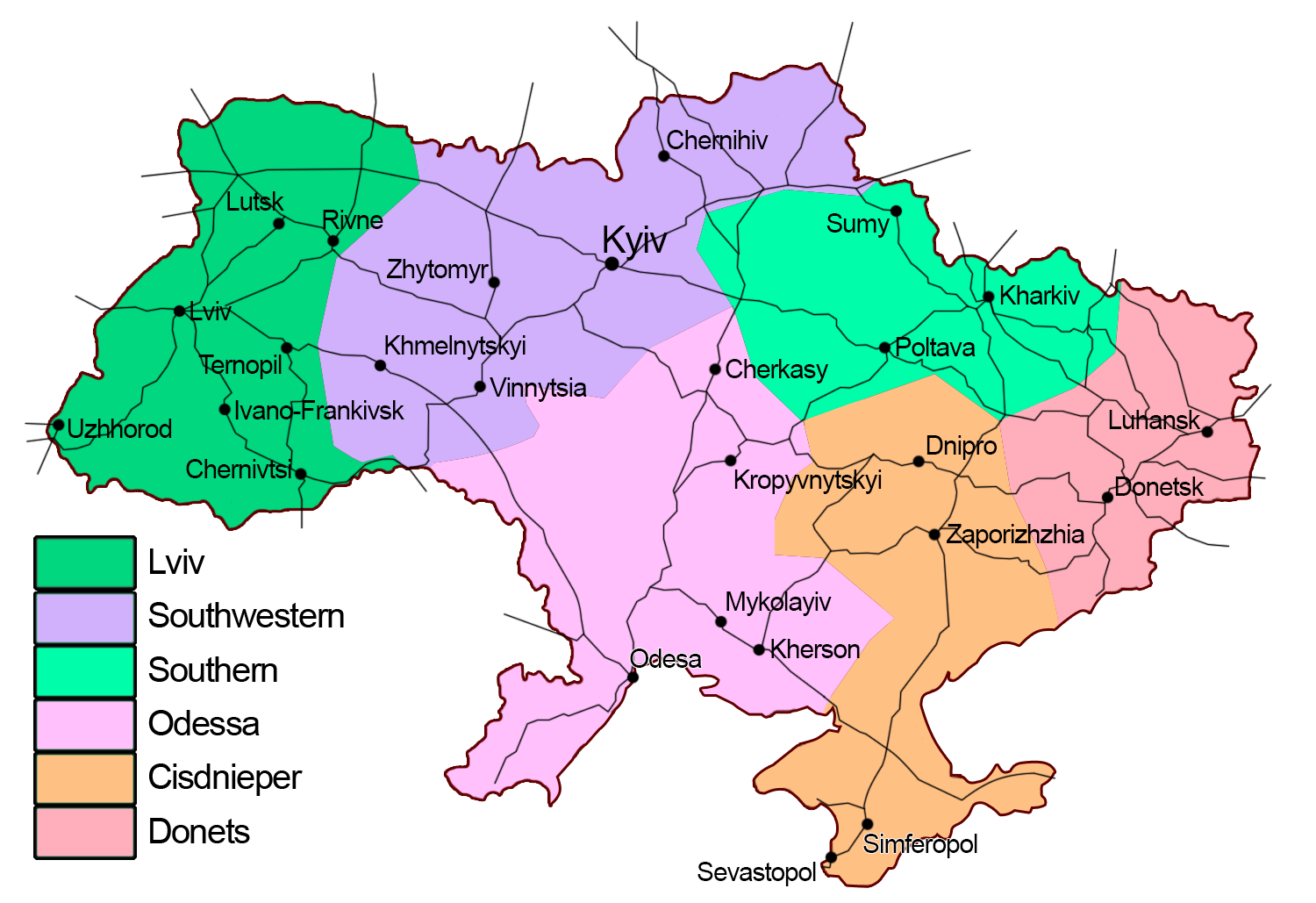
- Subdivisions of Ukrainian Railways

Overview
- Headquarters: Kyiv
- Locale: Central Ukraine, North Ukraine
- Dates of operation: 1870–present
- Predecessor: Southwestern Railways (Soviet Union)

Technical
- Track gauge: 1,520 mm (4 ft 11 27/32 in)
- Length: 4,668 km (2,900 mi)

Other
- Website: http://www.swrailway.gov.ua

Administration building of the Southwestern Railways in Kyiv

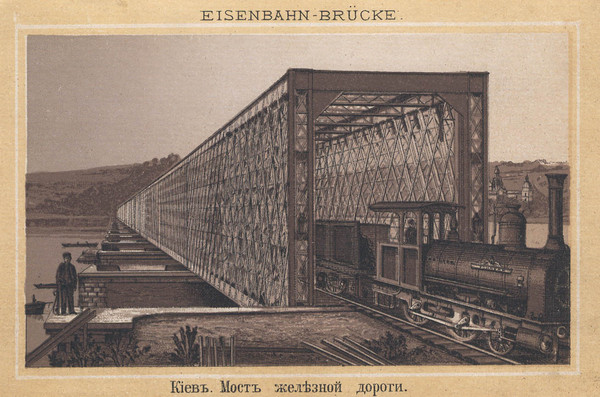
Struve Railroad Bridge

The Southwestern Railways (SWR), (Ukrainian: Південно-Західна залізниця, Pivdenno-Zakhidna Zaliznytsia (PZZ)) headquartered in Kyiv, the capital of Ukraine, is a component part of the Ukrzaliznytsia company, its regional branch.

== Naming ==
It is named "Southwestern" because it is southwest of Moscow, despite being in the Northern part of Ukraine. In February 2025, the Commission of the Ukrainian Institute of National Memory noted that the names " Southwestern " and " Southern Railways " are propaganda for Russian imperial policy and violate the law.

In 2023, on the initiative of the Ukrzaliznytsia and the Ministry for Recovery, Infrastructure and Transport of Ukraine with the help of the Ministry of Digital Transformation, a poll was held to change the name of the Southwestern Railways. The poll had four selections, with the Central Railways becoming the most popular.

== Structure ==
As of 2020, SWR's rail system included 4,351.3 km (2,704 mi) of exploitable track, of which 51.7% was electrified.

The SWR consists of five sections (directions) of railroad transportation, which are named after the cities of their administrative seat

- Kyiv
- Koziatyn
- Zhmerynka
- Korosten
- Konotop.

Each of the above-mentioned directions' administrative seats, besides their regular train stations, also have locomotive and railcar depots. In addition such depots also are located in Shepetivka, Darnytsia (left-bank Kyiv), Bakhmach, Vorozhba, Hrechany (neighborhood of Khemlnytskyi), and Snovsk (formerly Shchors). Around the city of Kyiv, there is a Kyiv Railway Hub, which consists of the southern semi-circle segment (original line) and the northern semi-circle segment (built in 1929).

As of 2020, the SWR accounted for 286 railway stations and/or halts.

== Geography ==
The SWR's route map roughly includes all the railroads in the Kyiv, Zhytomyr, Chernihiv, Vinnytsia, Khmelnytskyi, and Sumy oblasts (provinces of Ukraine) as well as some portions of other adjacent regions. Originally, the SWR was located on the right bank of the Dnieper, and its left-bank portion was added during the Soviet period.

Its territory borders Belarusian Railway to the north in Belarus, Moscow Railway to the north and northeast in Russia, Calea Ferată din Moldova to the southwest in Moldova, and three Ukrainian territorial branches of Ukrainian Railways, Lviv Railways to the west, Southern Railways to the east, and Odesa Railways to the south.

The Chernihiv–Ovruch railway segment, which passes Chernobyl Power Plant, has restricted use, and it also passes through the territory of neighboring Belarus, with which Ukraine has a special international agreement.

== History ==
The railway around Kyiv was built in the late 1860s. It all started when a concession for the Kyiv-Kursk Railway was created. The joint-stock association Kyiv-Kursk Railways was headed by Paul von Derwies and Karl Otto Georg von Meck. The Kyiv-Kursk Railway stretched to Brovary rather than Kyiv, which is a satellite city. The general distance of the railway line was over 460 km. The first train towards Brovary departed on 24 December 1868. However, the train derailed, and both the train driver and fireman died. The first successful arrival took place a few days later on 29 December 1868.

Around the same time, on 24 May 1866, the Kyiv-Balta Railway began its construction in the Kyiv neighborhood Cadet Grove (Kadetskyi hai). Unlike the Kyiv-Kursk Railway, it was financed by the state treasury yet contracted to a French company headed by the French engineer Filliol-Brogi. The construction involved 30,000 workers, who included soldiers, peasants and even convicts. At least three local infantry regiments were involved, while local peasants were forcefully brought to work despite the 1861 Russian abolition of serfdom. On 23 August 1868, the first train from Balta arrived at the train station on the bank of the Lybid River in Kyiv.

Originally, it was expected that both the Kyiv-Kursk and Kyiv-Balta railways would finish simultaneously to create a corridor to launch the Moscow-Odesa connection.

In 1868, an important piece of infrastructure in Kyiv, the Struve Railroad Bridge, began to be built, which, in 1870, connected both banks of the city over Dnieper as well as to the rest of the Russian Empire's railroad system. Also in 1870, the Kyiv-Pasazhyrskyi railway station, the main railway station of the Kyiv-Balta Railway, was built, along with repair locomotive shops. During the construction, a new populated place appeared, known as the Railway colony or Slobodka. In the settlement, the first professional educational institution was established, the Technical Railway School.

The first train from Kursk that reached Kyiv was on 2 March 1870. The first train departed from Kyiv to Birzula on 26 May 1870. The first train from Kyiv to Odesa traveled on 7 June 1870. In 1870, the Russian Steam Navigation and Trading Company (ROPiT) purchased from the imperial government the Odesa-Balta and the Odesa-Yelyzavetgrad lines as well as the segment between Tiraspol and Chisinau and the Birzula-Zhmerynka-Volochysk line. The same year, the Kyiv-Balta Railway went bankrupt and was bought by the Kyiv-Brest Railway Association, which also purchased from the state treasury the segment Kyiv-Zhmerynka with the branch Koziatyn-Berdychiv as well as built the line Bedychiv-Brest with the branch to Radyvyliv, near the Austro-Hungarian border.

Between 1871 and 1876, segments from Zhmerynka to Volochysk and from Berdychiv to Shepetivka were added, and between 1890 and 1897, the segments from Zhmerynka to Mohyliv-Podilskyi, Koziatyn to Uman, Khrystynivka to Shpola and Berdychiv to Zhytomyr; 1897 was also the year when the Fastiv line was added to the SWR. The Volyn line was brought into the SWR in 1902, the same year that the segment from Kyiv to Korosten was built. By the beginning of World War I, the total length of the SWR system was 3,096 km (1,924 mi).

In 1878, all railroads of the Right-bank Ukraine were consolidated as the South-Western Railway, when three main railways were merged: the Odesa Railway, the Kyiv-Brest Railway, and the Brest-Grajewo Railway. In 1871, a railway bridge was built over the Zbruch River connecting Volochysk and Pidvolochysk as well as providing a connection to the Austro-Hungarian railways. The opening took place on 4 November, which was the name day of Archduke Karl Ludwig of Austria.

Under the government of Ukrainian State in 1918, Minister of Railways (Connection Routes) Borys Butenko issued a decree, according to which Southwestern Railways were to be renamed Right-bank Railways.

=== Directors ===
Among the most notable directors of Southwestern Railways was Sergei Witte, who later became the Prime Minister of Russia.

- 1880 – 1889 Sergei Witte
- 1980 – 1999 Borys Oliynyk

== Sports section ==
During the Soviet era, when the railways were part of the All-Union Ministry of Railways (Communication Ways), they had their own sports section (department) under the broader Lokomotiv sports society. Following the dissolution of the Soviet Union and reorganization of the Southwestern Railways, their sports section became alienated and was reorganized as a separate business entity.

Notable departments of the Lokomotiv Kyiv sports society

- FC Lokomotyv Kyiv
- FC Nyva Vinnytsia (previously as Lokomotyv Vinnytsia), transferred away in 1970s to the Kolos sports society

== See also ==
- Jan Gotlib Bloch
- Libava–Romny Railway
