= Poltava-Pivdenna railway station =

Railway station in Poltava, Ukraine

Poltava–Pivdenna Полтава–Південна
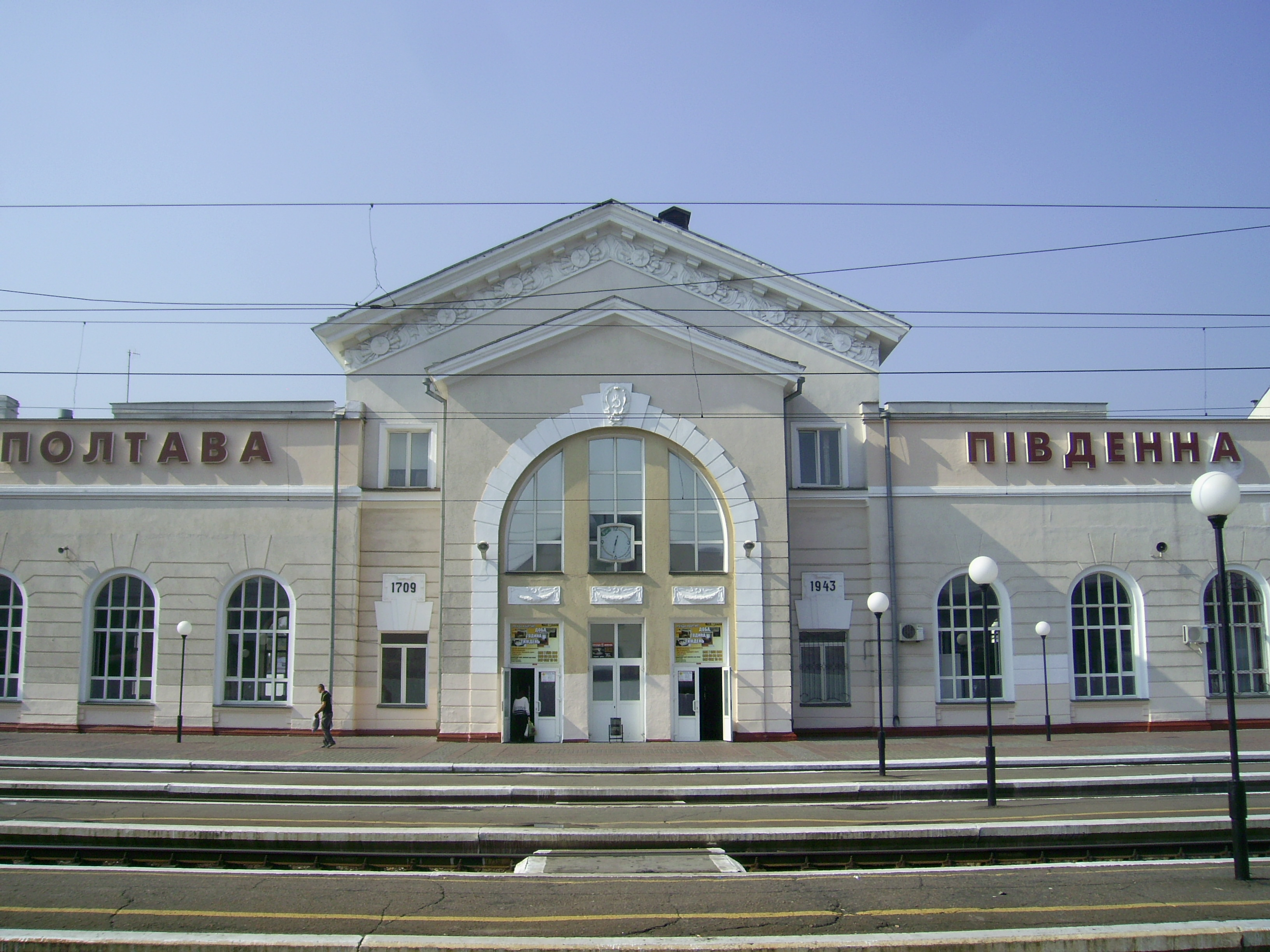

General information
- Location: Slavy sq. 1, Poltava, Ukraine
- Coordinates: 49°34′55.5″N 34°35′41.5″E
- System: Southern Railways terminal
- Owner: Ukrzaliznytsia
- Platforms: 4
- Tracks: 13

Construction
- Parking: Yes

Other information
- Station code: 448709

History
- Opened: 1870
- Rebuilt: 1947
- Electrified: 2008

Services
Preceding station	Ukrzaliznytsia	Following station
Skhidnyi	Southern Railways	Vorskla
Location

Poltava–Pivdenna (Poltava-Southern, Ukrainian: Полтава–Південна) is a railway station in Poltava, Ukraine. The station is a railway node of four lines and is the main station of the Poltava Directorate of Southern Railways. The station was opened along with the Poltava — Kremenchuk Line on 1 August 1870, and currently houses 3 maintenance depots, as well as a number of technical and administrative facilities.

The building of the station is a monument of architecture of regional significance.

== History ==
During the second half of the 19th century, the Russian Empire saw an intensive construction of new railway lines connecting the central provinces with sea ports. In 1864, the government decided to build the Kharkov-Nikolaev railway, connecting the ports of Odesa, Mykolaiv and Kherson with Kharkiv via Kremenchuk and Poltava.

The station was opened on 1 August 1870. On 1 June 1871, the line in the direction of Kharkiv was opened. In 1870, a locomotive depot was built at the station and in 1871, a locomotive repair workshops were opened, which operates to this day as Poltava Locomotive Repair Plant. In 1901, Poltava — Kyiv and Poltava — Lozova lines were opened, turning the station into a node. On 1 February 1934, as a result of reforms in railway transport, the Southern Railway was formed. The Poltava-Pivdenna station became the center of one of its branches.

Until 1880, a temporary wooden passenger building operated at the station. In 1880, the first permanent building of the station was built in the neoclassical style with elements of decorative wooden carvings on the facade. On each side, the building was framed by wooden pillars. To the right of the station there was a water tower. In 1937-1938, the building of the station was renovated and expanded.

During the World War Two, the station was completely destroyed, with only one wall from the side of the railway tracks remaining. The modern building of the railway station was built in 1947, according to the project by the architect Yevhenii Lymar. From the side of Slava Square, the central entrance to the station is decorated with two monumental bas-reliefs, which symbolize the history of the city: the Battle of Poltava in 1709 and the liberation of the city from the German troops in 1943.

In 2000, the station square and passenger building complex were renovated and modernized. The station building underwent another major renovation before the 2012 European Football Championship. The station was electrified on 19 November 2008.

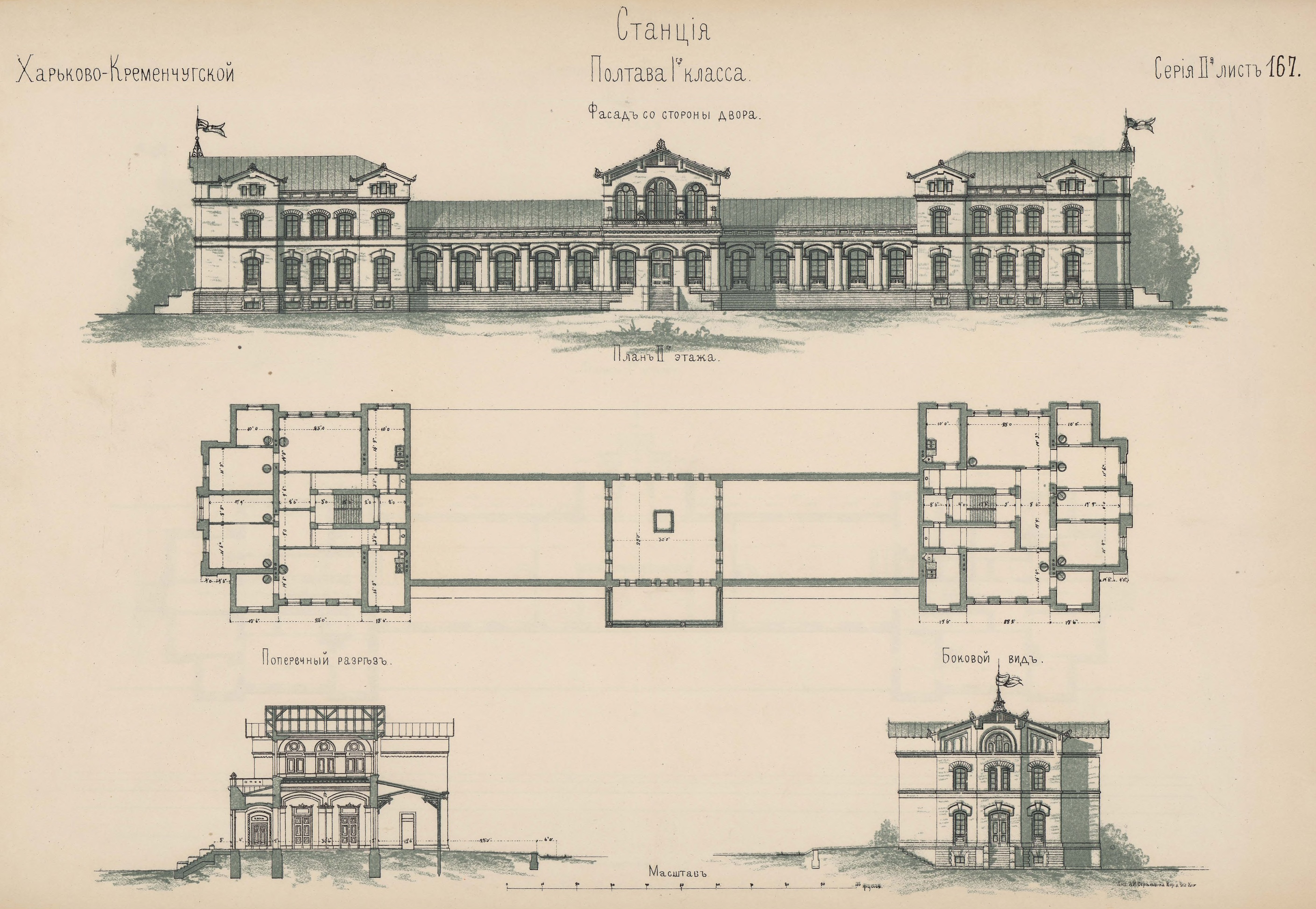
Blueprints of the original building of the station

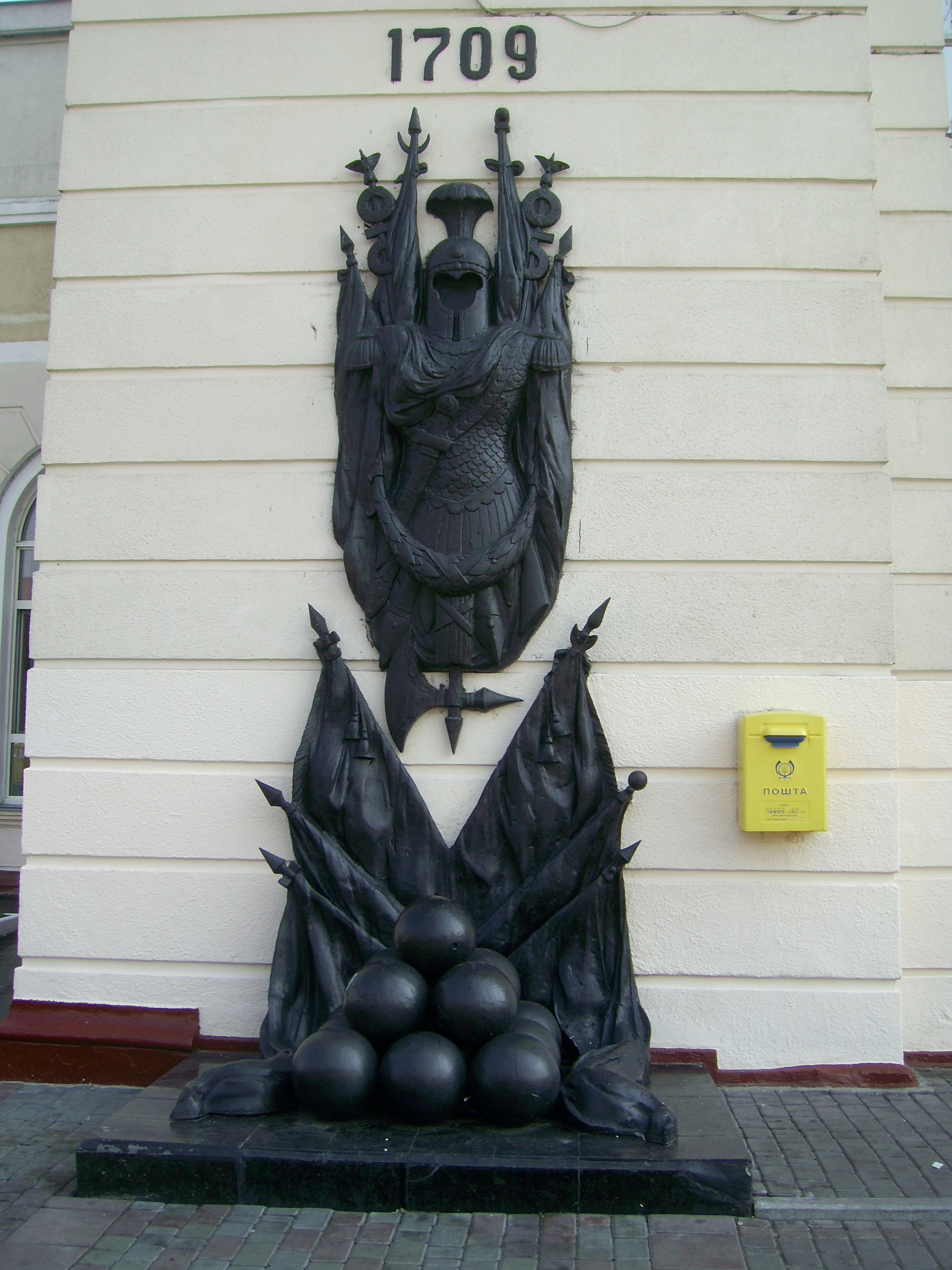
1709 Battle of Poltava bas-relief

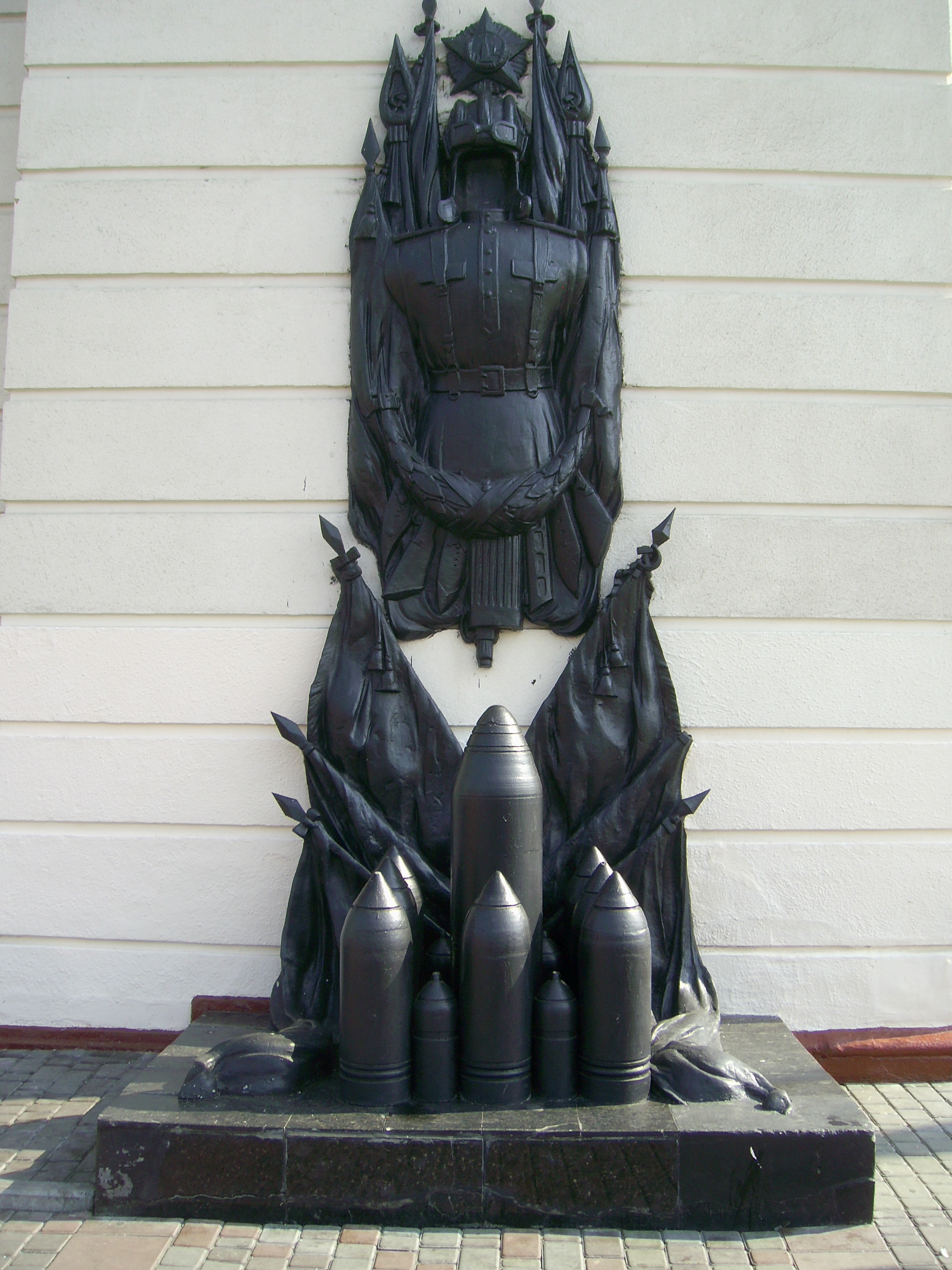
1943 Liberation of Poltava bas-relief

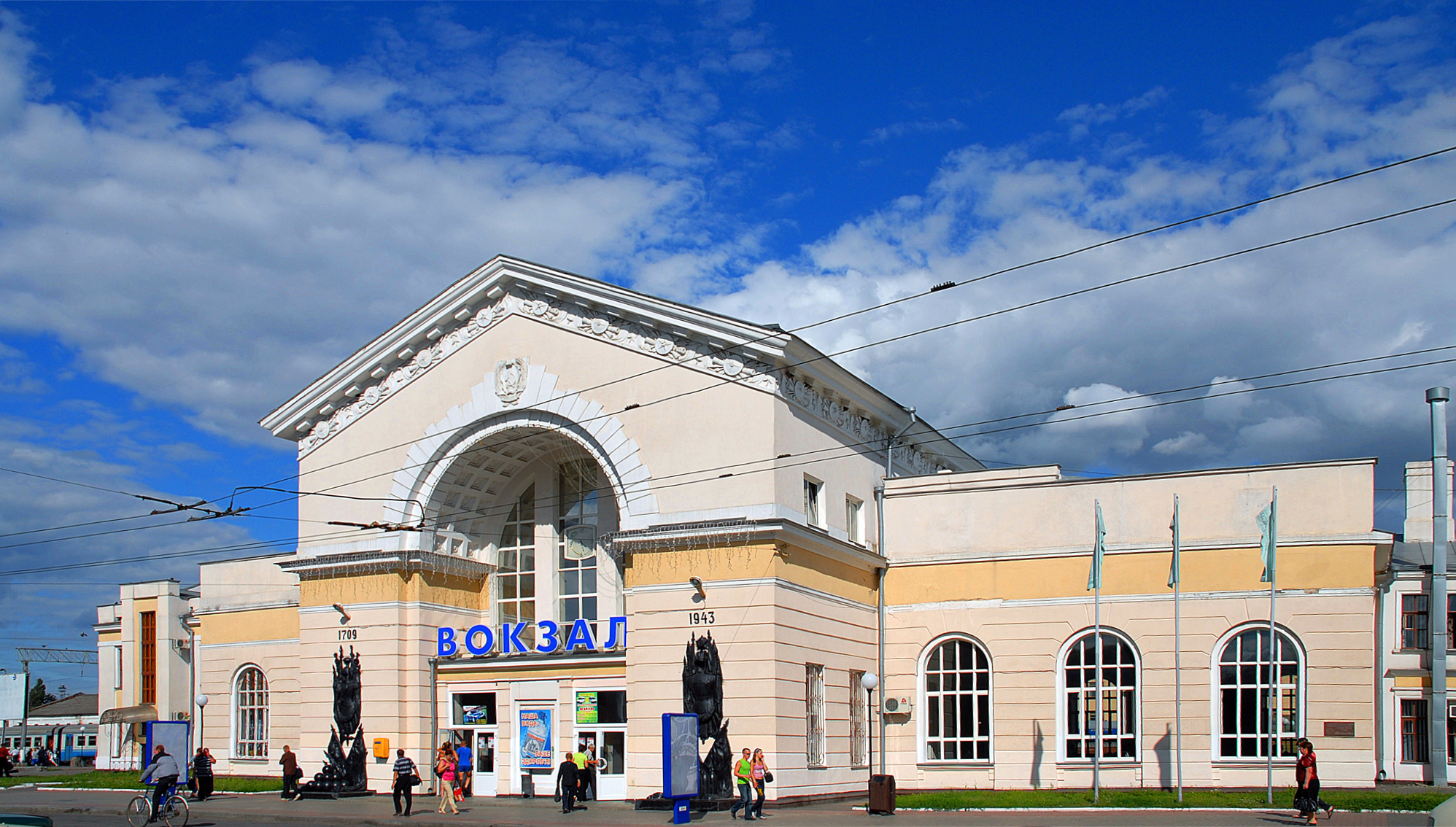
Station from the Slavy Square

== Facilities ==
The station is home to the Poltava Directorate of Railway Transport, a locomotive depot, a motorcar depot, a freight car depot, a track maintenance department, a signaling and communication department, two construction and installation departments, a power supply department, a passenger car station, a recovery train, a police department, interdistrict transport prosecutor's office. Separate tracks connect the station with several industrial enterprises. The station is electrified with alternating current (~25 kV).

The station square is the terminus of trolleybus routes 1, 2, 4, 6 and bus routes 50, 51, 52. Trolleybus route 1 connects Poltava-Pivdenna station with Poltava-Kyivska station. In 2018, the "Poltava-4" bus station was opened on the station square.

== Services ==
Passenger services as of August 2024:

Long-distance routes
7/8 "Palmira"	Odesa — Kharkiv	Alternate days
104	Kramatorsk — Lviv (through Kyiv)	Every day
101/102	Kramatorsk — Kherson (through Kyiv)	Alternate days
149/150	Chernivtsi — Poltava (through Kyiv)	Alternate days
Suburban routes
	Kremenchuk — Poltava	Every day; 4 pairs
	Ohultsi— Poltava	Every day; 3 pairs; No. 7014 Friday-Saturday
	Lozova — Poltava	Every day; 5 pairs
	Kobelyaky — Poltava	Every day; 1 pair
	Hrebinka — Ohultsi	Every day; 1 train
	Hrebinka — Poltava	Every day; 2 pairs
	Romodan — Poltava	Every day; 1 pair
	Poltava — Kolomak	Every day; 1 train

== Sources ==
- Альбомъ чертежей общаго расположенія путей, зданій и мостовых сооруженій существующихъ въ Россіи желѣзныхъ дорогъ. Выпуск I. Составилъ И. И. Волгуновъ. — М.: Печатня С. П. Яковлева, 1872 г. — Серія II^{я}. Листъ 167.
- Тарифное руководство № 4. Книга 1 (на 15.05.2021)
- Архангельский А. С., Архангельский В. А. Железнодорожные станции СССР: Справочник. В двух книгах. — М. : Транспорт, 1981.
- Україна. Атлас залізниць. Масштаб 1:750 000. — К. : ДНВП «Картографія», 2008. — 80 с. — ISBN 978-966-475-082-7.
