= Sloviansk railway station =

Main railway station in the Ukrainian city of Sloviansk

Sloviansk Слов'янськ
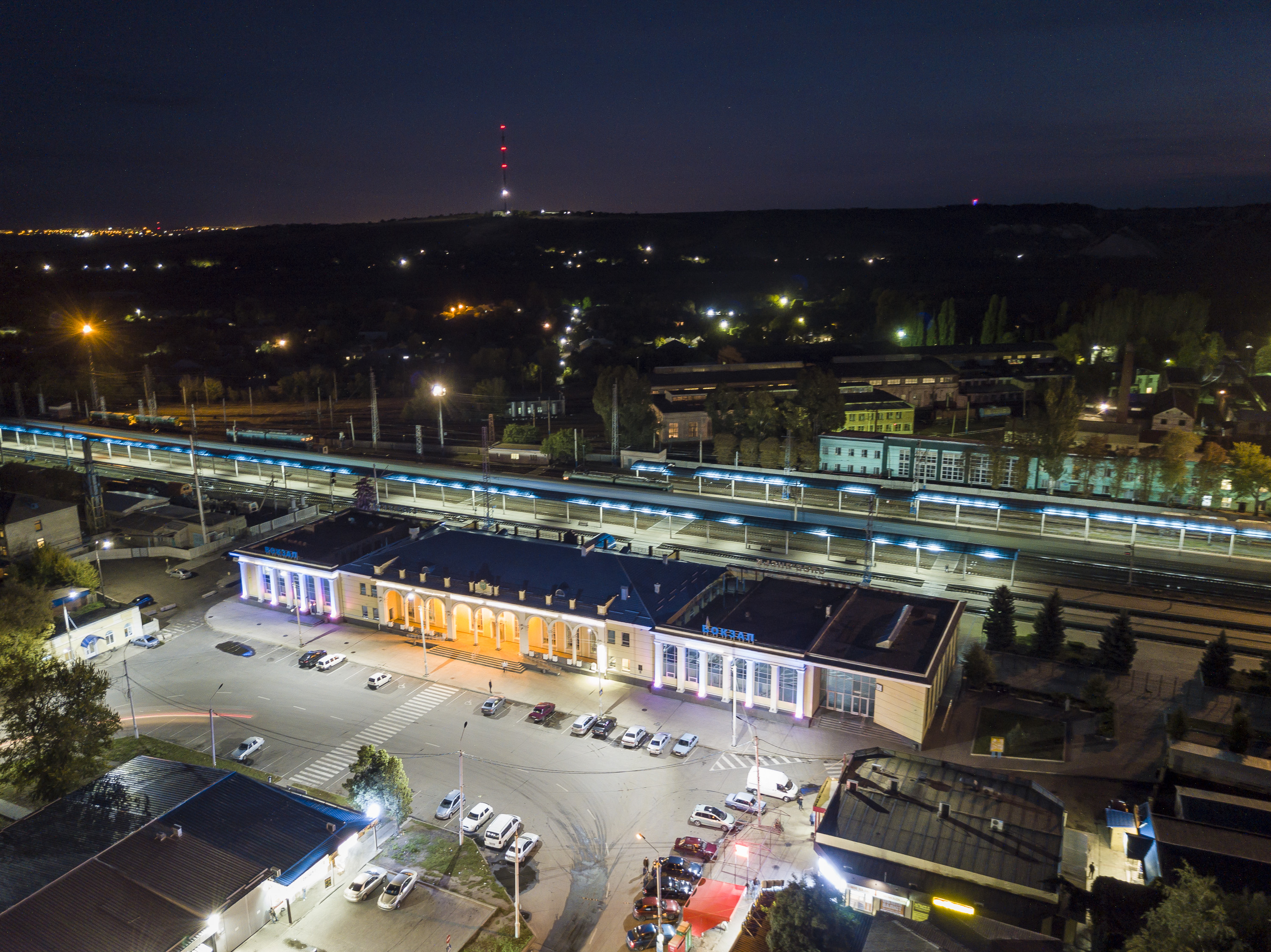
- Front view of the railway station

General information
- Location: 1 Privolzalna Sq, Sloviansk, Kramatorsk Raion; Donetsk Oblast, Ukraine
- Coordinates: 48°49′57″N 37°33′21″E
- System: Donets Railway station
- Operator: Donets Railway
- Distance: 635 kilometres (395 mi) from Kyiv
- Platforms: 4

Other information
- Station code: 492006

History
- Opened: 1869

Services
Preceding station	Ukrainian Railways	Following station
Barvinkove toward Odesa-Holovna	Yellow Ribbon	Kramatorsk Terminus
Barvinkove toward Lviv	Invincibility	Kramatorsk Terminus
Andriivka toward Lozova-Pasazhyrskyi or Izium	Donets Railway; Lymanskaya (DH-2)	Terminus
Location

The Sloviansk railway station (Ukrainian: Станція Слов'янськ) is the main railway station in the Ukrainian city of Sloviansk. It first opened in 1869, and is currently operated by Donets Railway.

== History ==
In late 1869, the station was a part of the railway project connecting the city of Kursk with the Sea of Azov.

At the time, there were other stations in the city that were also commonly used, including Sloviansk-Vitka and Sloviansk-Kurort.

== Destinations ==
The station has 3 immediate rail destination cities: Lozova, Lyman, and Horlivka.

In 2017, Ukrainian Railways added an electrified rail line from this station towards Pokrovsk.
