= Lozova-Pasazhyrskyi railway station =

Railway station in Lozova, Ukraine

Lozova–Pasazhirskyi Лозова–Пасажирський
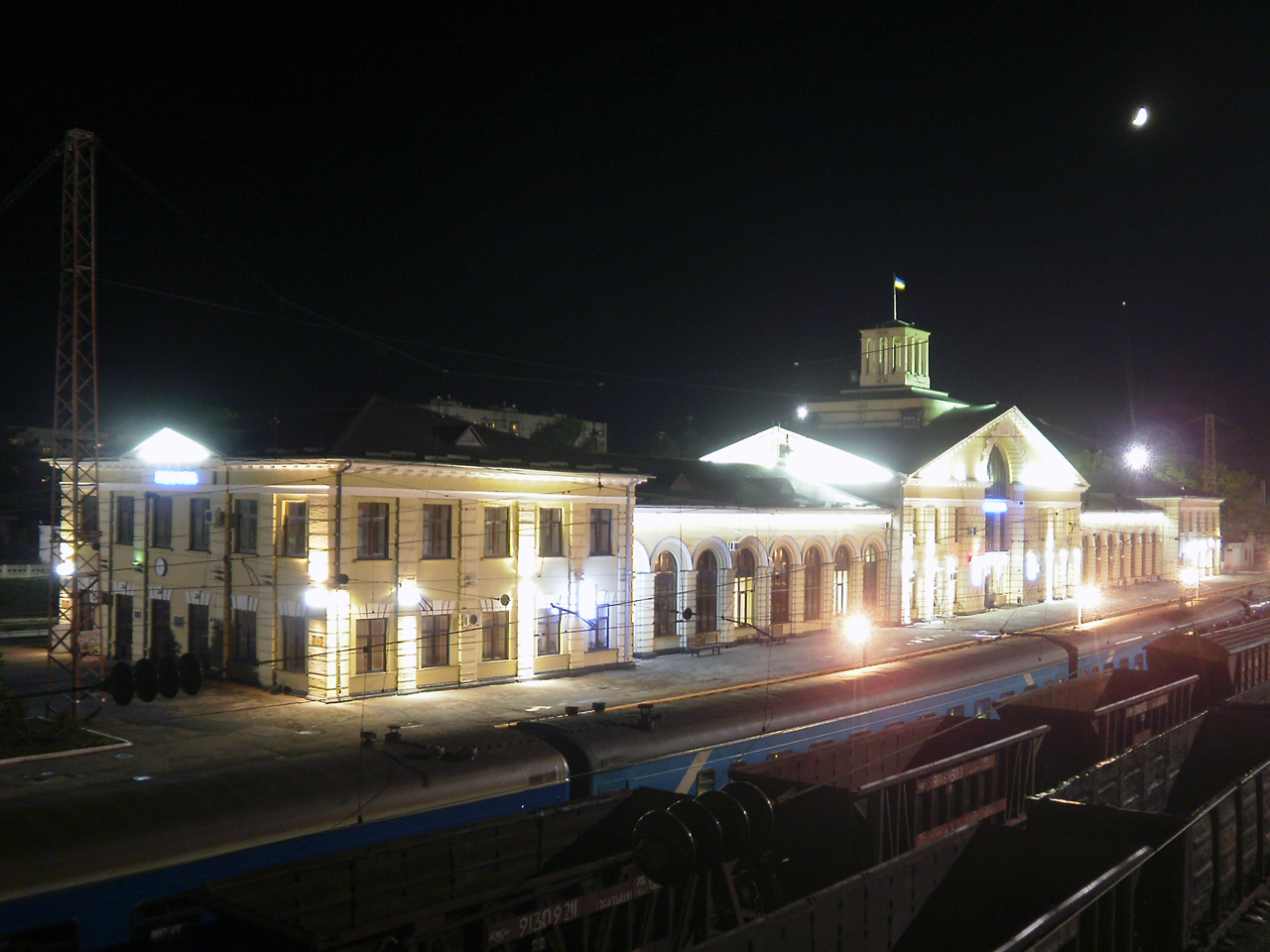
- Lozova Railway Station at Night

General information
- Location: Lozova, Kharkiv Oblast, Ukraine
- Coordinates: 48°53′26.73″N 36°19′13.66″E
- Owner: Ukrainian Railways
- Platforms: 6
- Tracks: 19
- Connections: Taxi Stand

Construction
- Parking: Available

Other information
- Station code: LOZ
- Fare zone: Southern Railways

History
- Opened: 1906
- Rebuilt: 1954

Passengers
- 60,000 (Estimated Yearly)

Services
Preceding station	Ukrainian Railways	Following station
Pavlohrad toward Odesa-Holovna	Yellow Ribbon	Barvinkove toward Kramatorsk
Krasnohrad toward Lviv	Invincibility	Blyzniuky toward Kramatorsk
Terminus	Donets Railway; Lymanskaya (DH-2)	Blyzniuky toward Sloviansk
Terminus	Donets Railway; Lymanskaya (DH-2)	Imeni Kozhushka toward Lyman
Zavodska toward Merefa or Berestyn	Southern Railways	Terminus
Terminus	Southern Railways	Marusiv Sad toward Synelnykove I
Location

Lozova–Pasazhirskyi (Ukrainian: Лозова–Пасажирський) is a main hub and a railway junction in East Ukraine. It is the second busiest railway station in Kharkiv Oblast after Kharkiv Railway Station. It is located 156.3 km south of Russia and is a subsidy of Southern Railways an administrative branch of Ukrainian Railways.

== Building ==
In 1869 the railway line was opened between Kursk and Azov Sea. The place where the modern building structure is located was named Lozova. Shortly after building a small station it was decided to make it a dividing line railway station.

== History ==
On 5 August 2025, Russian forces targeted the station resulting in the deaths of two people and injuring 10 others. Ukrainian authorities claimed that over 30 Geran-2 drones were used in the attack.
