= Chernivtsi railway station =

Railway station in Chernivtsi, Ukraine

Chernivtsi Чернівці
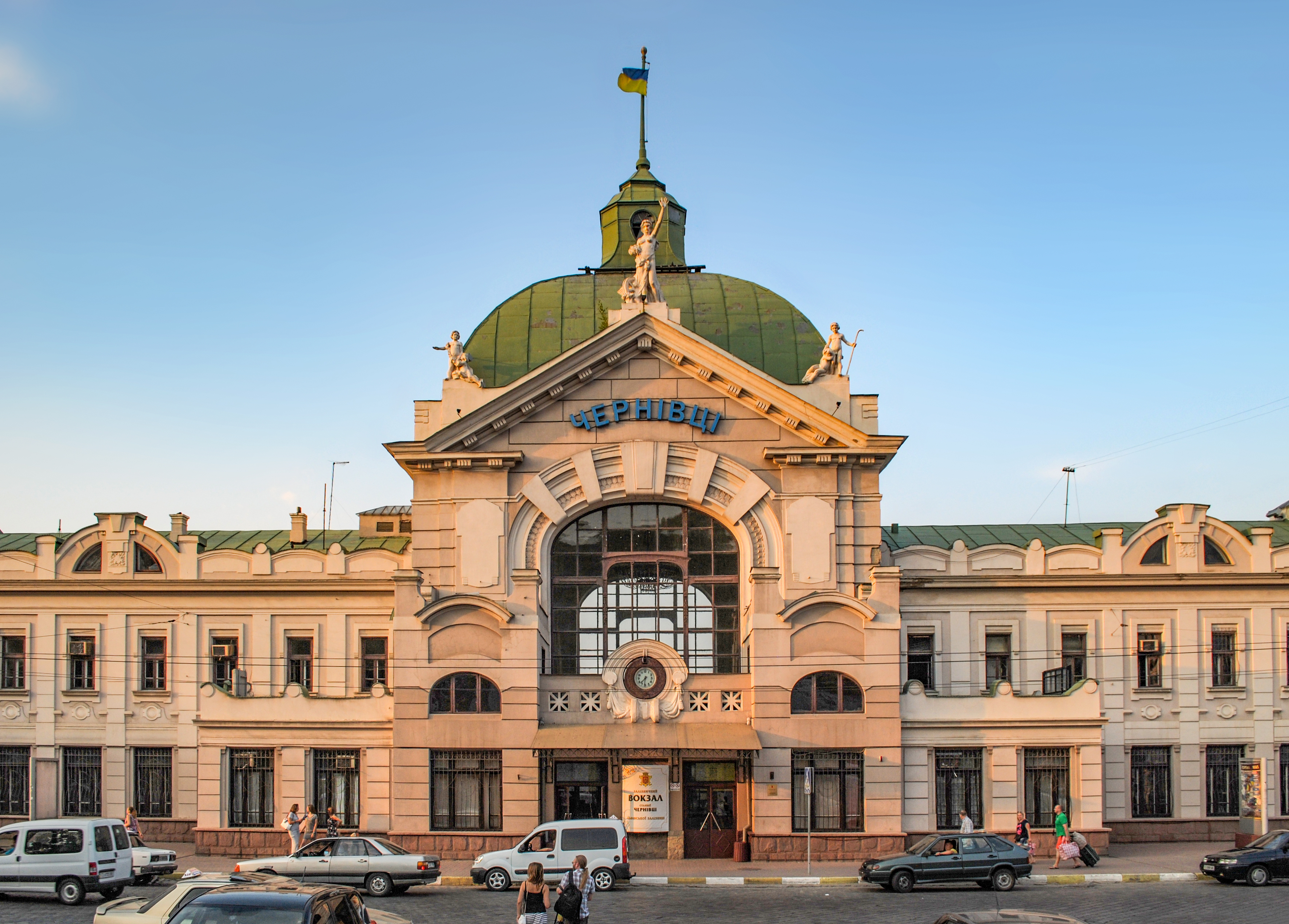

General information
- Location: Vokzalna str. 38, Chernivtsi; Ukraine
- Coordinates: 48°18′4″N 25°55′47″E
- System: Lviv Railways terminal
- Owner: Ukrzaliznytsia
- Platforms: 3
- Connections: 3, 5, 11; 1, 7, 8, 15, 23

Construction
- Structure type: At-grade
- Architect: Otto Wagner
- Architectural style: Vienna Secession

Other information
- Station code: 366602

History
- Opened: 1 September 1866
- Rebuilt: 1909

Services
Preceding station	Ukrzaliznytsia	Following station
Chernivtsi-Pivnichna	Lviv Railways	Chernivtsi-Pivdenna

Immovable Monument of Local Significance of Ukraine
- Official name: Залізничний вокзал (Railway station building)
- Type: Architecture
- Reference no.: 2553-Чв
Location

The Chernivtsi railway station (Ukrainian: Залізнична станція Чернівці, romanized: Zaliznychna stantsiia Chernivtsi) is the main railway station of Chernivtsi, Western Ukraine. Situated on Chernivtsi-Pivnichna — Bahrynivka Line, 47.6 kilometers (29.57 mi) from the Romanian border. The station has three platforms – two island platforms and one side platform.

The station opened along with the Lviv — Chernivtsi Line on 1 September 1866, which was built as an extension of Vienna — Lviv Line opened in December 1863. The new building was constructed from 1906 to 1909. In 1982, the building of the station was included on the list of architectural monuments of local significance.

== History ==
In 1841, the government of the Austrian Empire approved the Railways Program, which, among other things, provided the development of railways in Galicia. The line from Vienna to Lviv was planned to be built by December 31, 1863. After that, it was to be extended to Chernivtsi, at the time, the capital of Bukovina District.

After that, the construction of the Lviv — Chernivtsi railway branch with a length of 267 km, which passed through Khodoriv and Stanislaviv, began at an active pace, with the workers working in two shifts. The railroad was laid through swamps, mountains and forests. The works were managed by the English engineering contractor Thomas Brassey, who had already worked on the railways of Australia and Canada. The line was completed in two years.

The first passenger train from Lviv arrived on 1 September 1866. After that the construction of lines began in the following directions: to Russia, through Novoselytsia to Vinnytsia and Chișinău, and to Romania, through Suceava to Iași. Notably, Chernivtsi was one of the first Ukrainian cities to be connected with a railway. Kharkiv saw its first train in 1869, Kyiv and Ternopil in 1870, and in 1873 the railway connection with Volhynia was established.

For the opening of railway traffic to Chernivtsi, a relatively small station was built. Its size was sufficient in the early years of the station's operation. In 1867, only 20,062 arriving and 21,256 departing passengers were recorded, but the number of passengers grew to more than half a million per year by the end of 19th century. The old building of the station was constructed under the same project as the old building of the station in Stanislaviv and currently operating Suceava Nord station.

At the time of completion, the station was located on the outskirts of Chernivtsi, one and a half kilometers from the city center. Additionally, the city center is located on a hill, unlike the station, located near the Prut River, with the streets leading from the station to the center of Chernivtsi having a noticeable incline. To facilitate the connection between the station and the city, in 1897 a tram line connecting the station with the Central Square was built. The line was dismantled in 1966–1967.

The new station was designed in the Vienna Secession style, presumably by Otto Wagner, who had experience in constructing railway passenger buildings for Vienna Stadtbahn stations. The foundation of the building was laid on 16 September 1906. The work continued for more than three years. The grand opening of the new railway station took place on 30 November 1909.

During the First World War, the railway station suffered significant destruction. Its restoration lasted about two years and was finally completed only in 1920. Restoration work had to be carried out again in 1945, at the end of the Second World War. However, due to the fact that the building did not receive significant damage during the hostilities, the work did not last long.

== Architecture ==
The composition of the building is symmetrical and consists of a two-story elongated rectangle with a towering central part, which is crowned by a dome over the main hall of the station. The dome is 20 meters high and ends with a tower hosting a flagpole. At the top of the pediment, above the main entrance to the station, there is a statue of the goddess Iris. The statue is surrounded on both sides by four angels: one pair holds flowers in their hands, the other two are depicted with arrows.

The high ceiling of the main hall of the station, which represents the inner surface of the dome, as well as its walls are covered with artistic modeling in the form of a geometrical ornament of leaves and flowers, between which female heads and masks are placed. The combination of light green and white walls and moldings is emphasized by gilded accents.

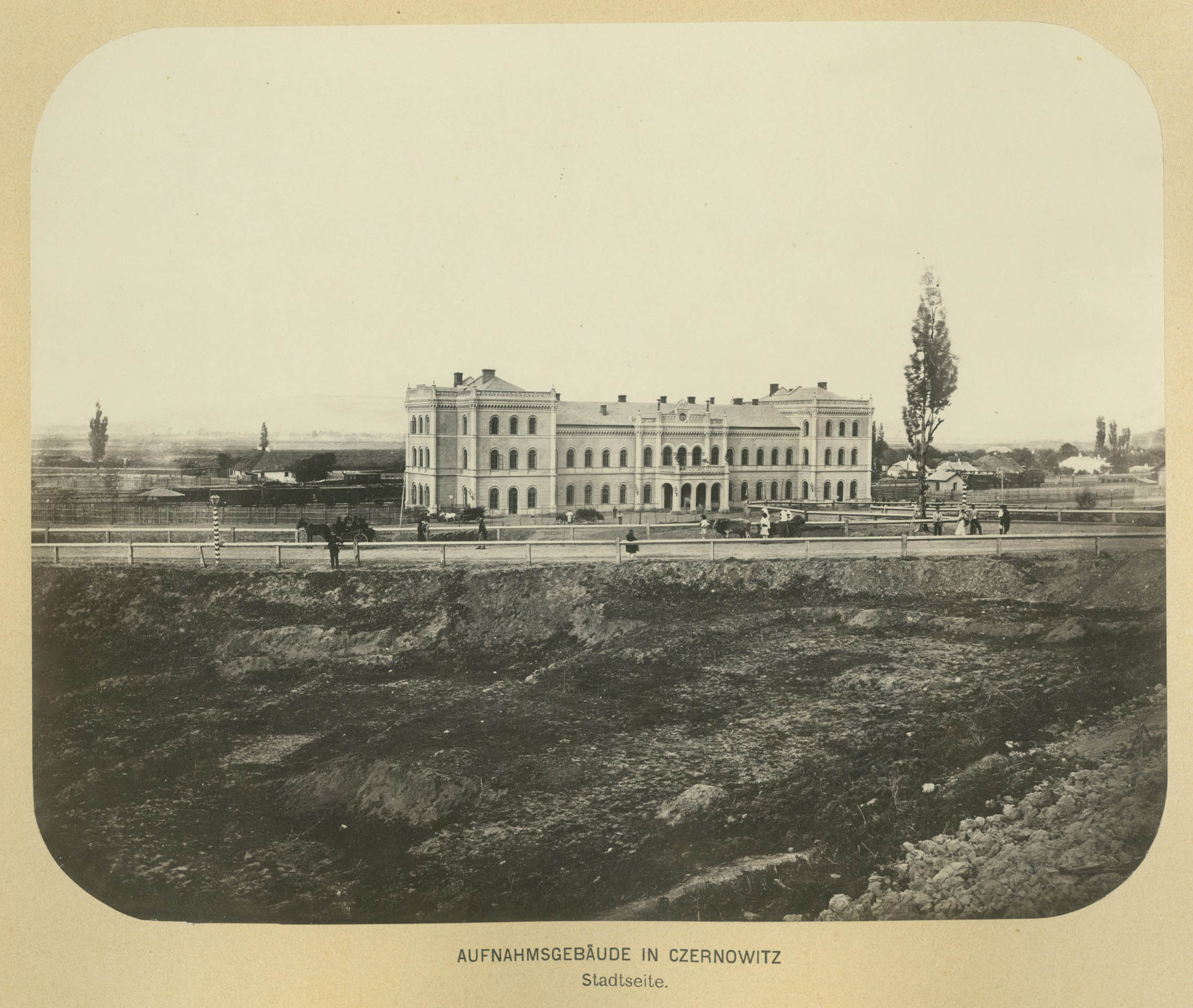
Old building of the station

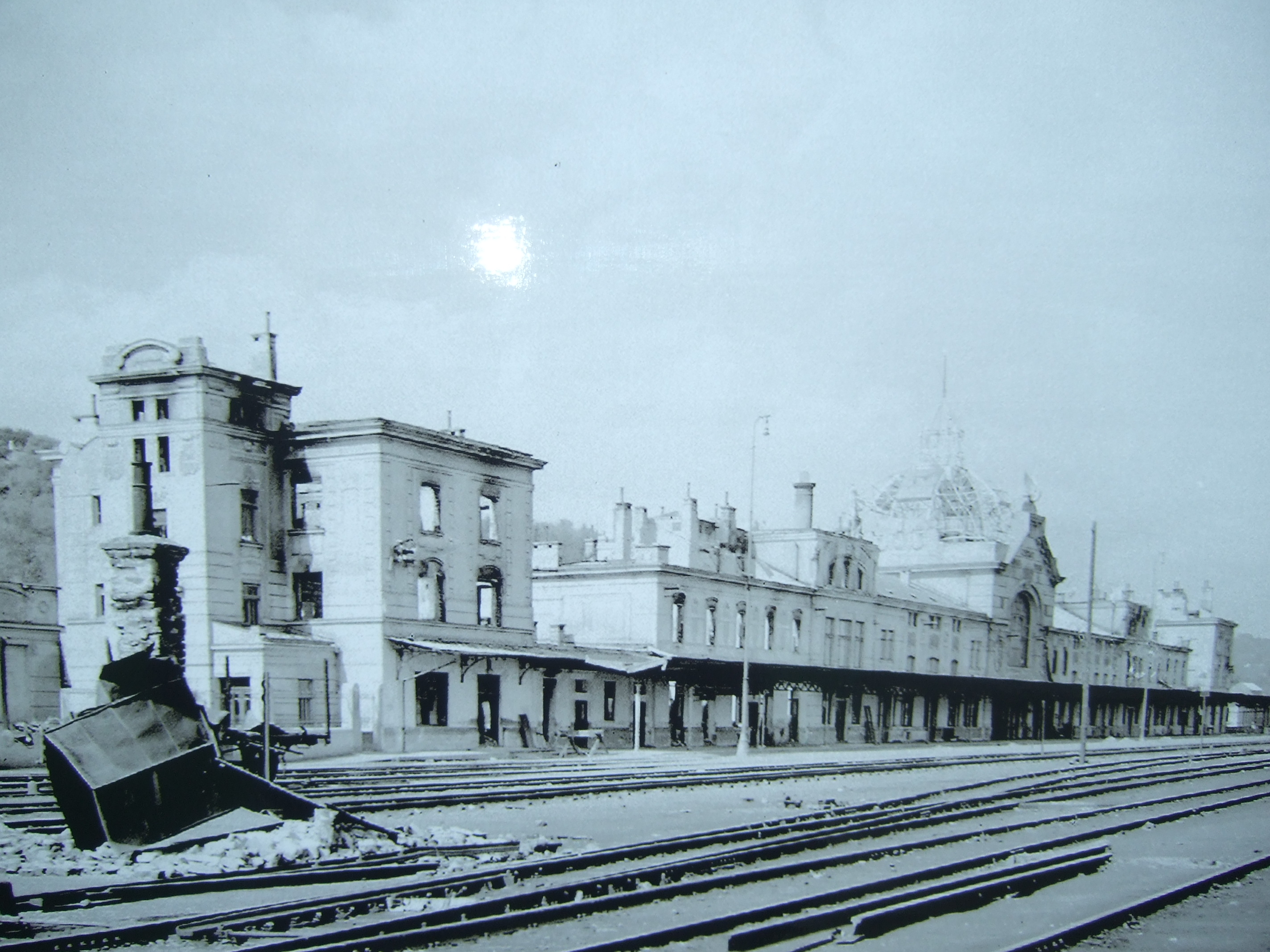
Station in 1917

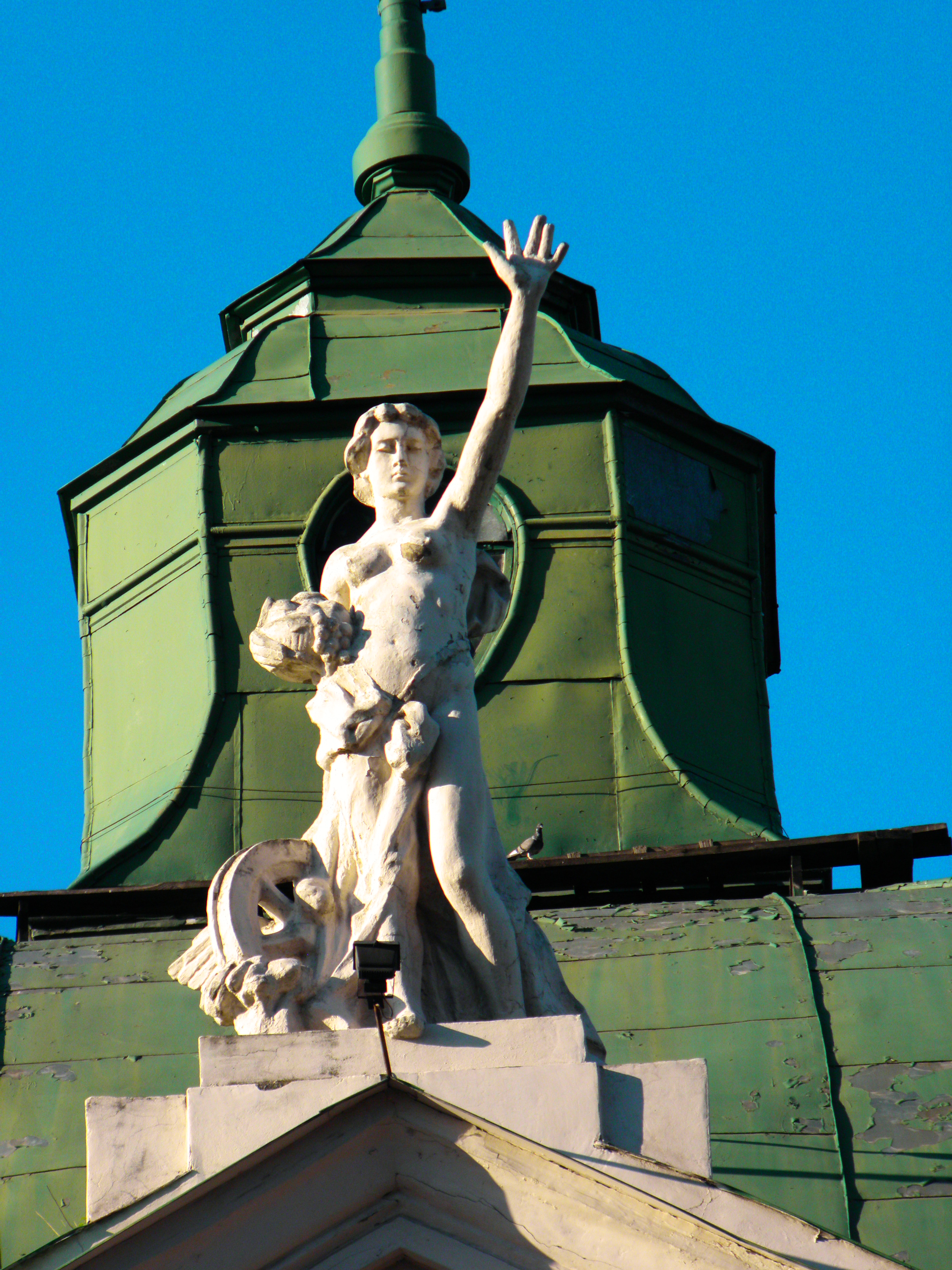
Statue of Iris

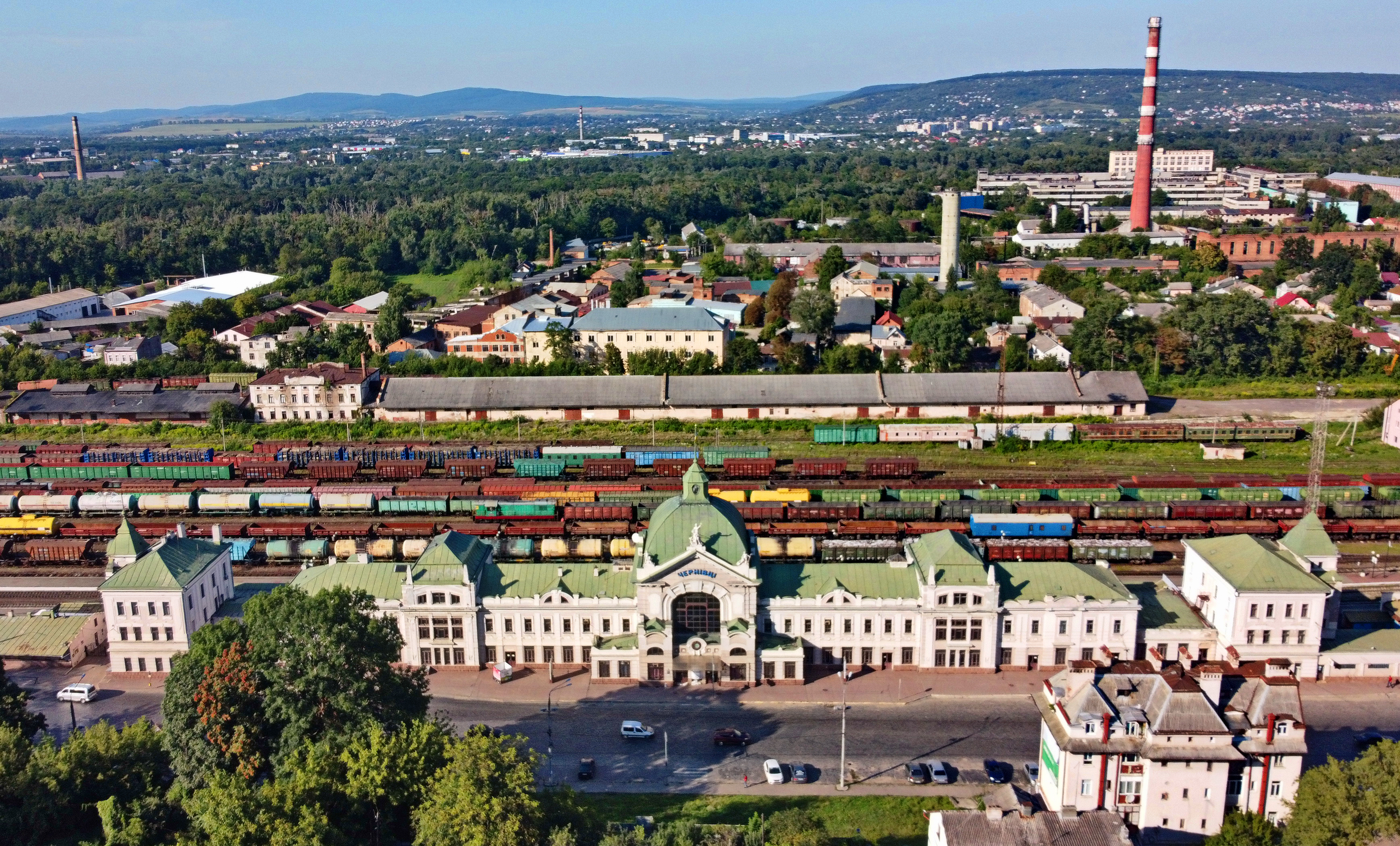
Aerial photo

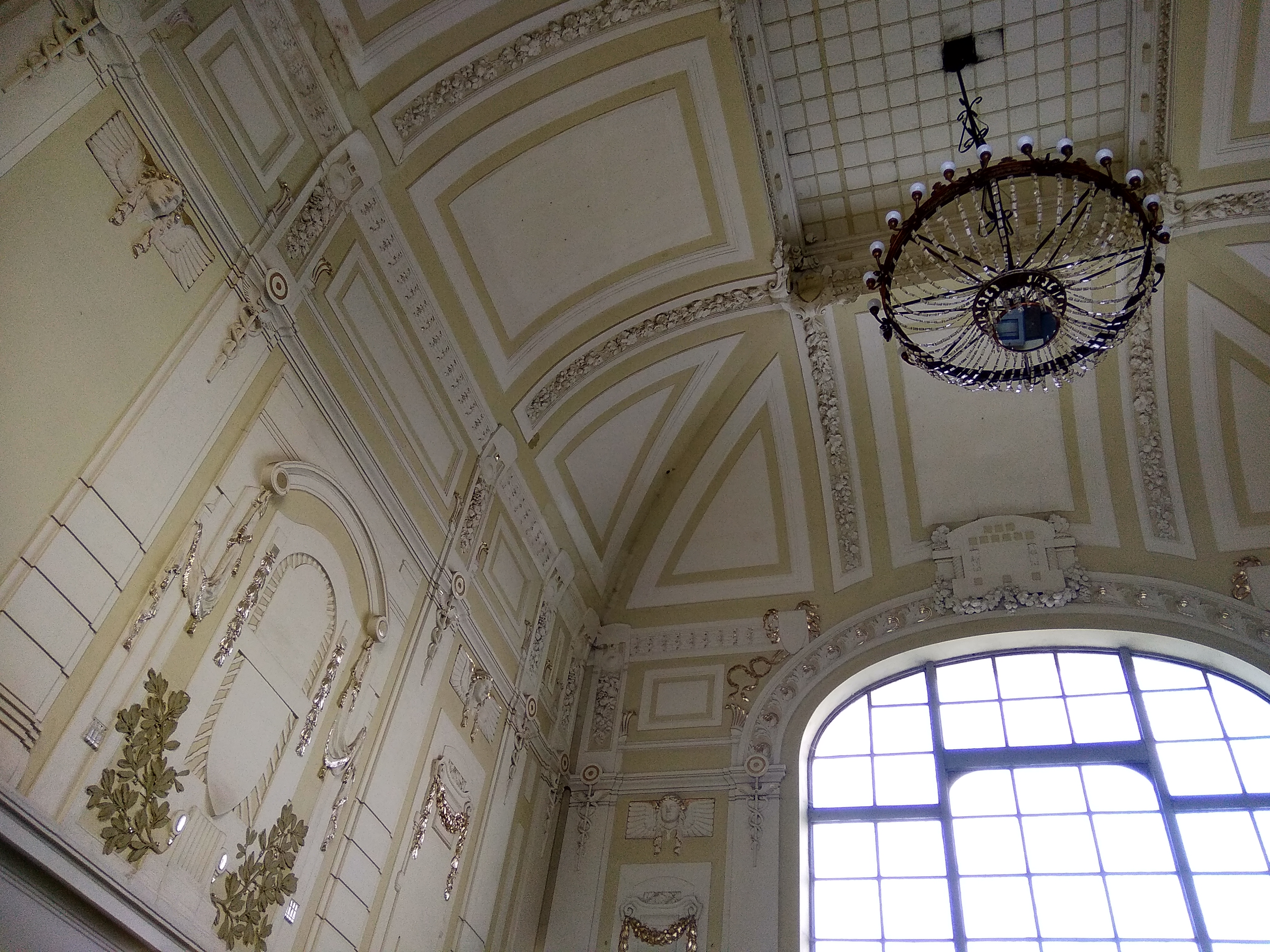
Interior decorations

== Services ==
Chernivtsi railway station is a part of the operational structure of the Lviv Railways. Chernivtsi is the terminus for all arriving long-distance and local passenger trains. Passenger services as of June 2024:

Long-distance routes
007/008 "Night Express"	Kyiv — Chernivtsi	Southwestern Railways	Every day
135/136 "Chornomor"	Odesa — Chernivtsi	Lviv Railways	Every day; before 2021, in the summer months, the train route continued to the Bilhorod-Dnistrovskyi station
129/130	Kremenchuk — Chernivtsi	Lviv Railways	Alternate days
149/150	Poltava — Chernivtsi	Lviv Railways	Alternate days
215/216	Zaporizhzhia — Chernivtsi	Lviv Railways	Alternate days
Regional routes
701/702	Lviv — Chernivtsi (through Ivano-Frankivsk)	Lviv Railways	Every day
801/802 "Dnister Express"	Lviv — Chernivtsi (through Ternopil)	Lviv Railways	Every day

The station is served by a number of municipal busses and trolleybuses operated by Chernivtsi Trolleybus Company, as well as privately operated busses and minibuses.
