= Poltava-Kyivska railway station =

Railway station in Poltava, Ukraine

Poltava–Kyivska Полтава–Київська
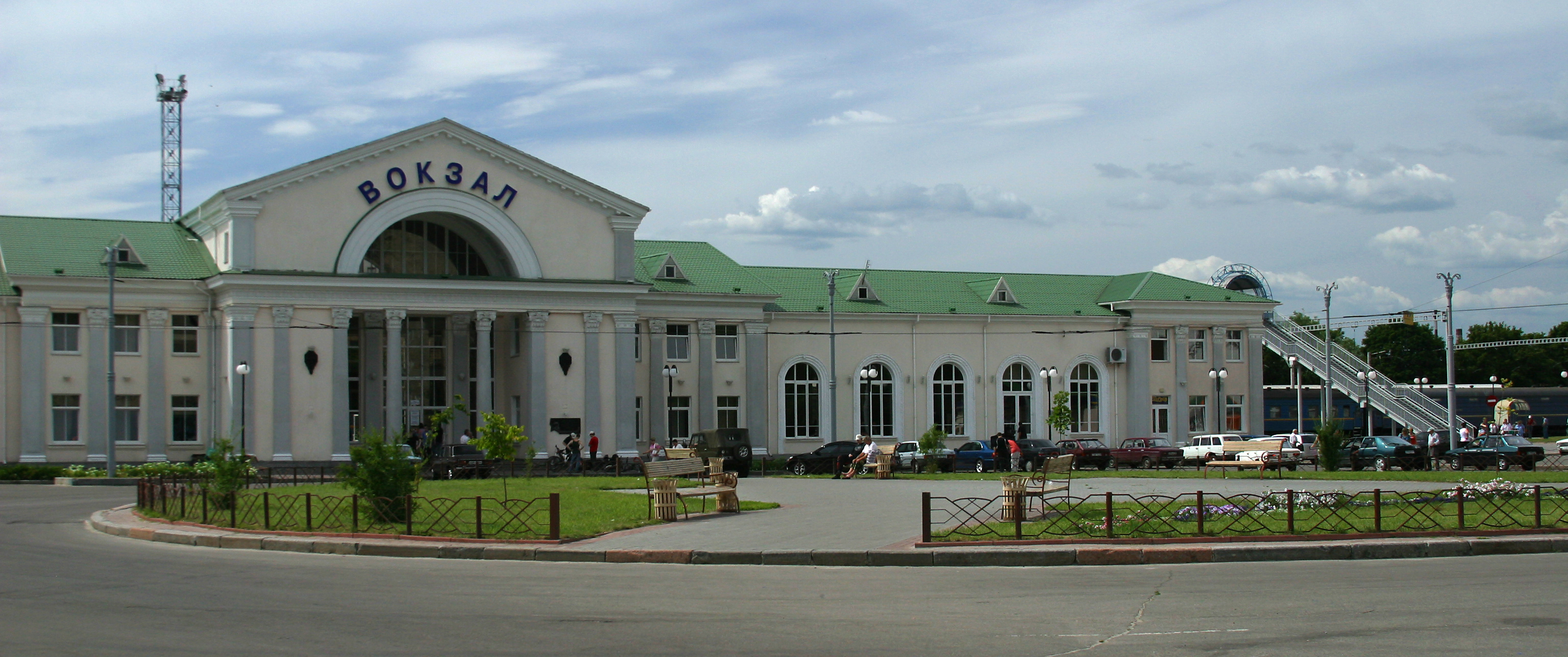

General information
- Location: Kondratenka St. 12, Poltava; Ukraine
- Coordinates: 49°36′12.14″N 34°31′33.42″E
- System: Southern Railway terminal
- Owner: Ukrzaliznytsia
- Platforms: 2
- Tracks: 7

Construction
- Parking: yes

History
- Opened: 1901

Services
Preceding station	Ukrzaliznytsia	Following station
Suprunivka	Southern Railways	Shvedska Mohyla
Location

Poltava–Kyivska (Ukrainian: Полтава–Київська) is a railway station in Poltava, Ukraine.

== See also ==
- Ukrzaliznytsia - the national railway company of Ukraine
- Poltava-Pivdenna Railway station - another major railway station in Poltava
