= Władysław Sadłowski =

Polish architect (1869–1940)

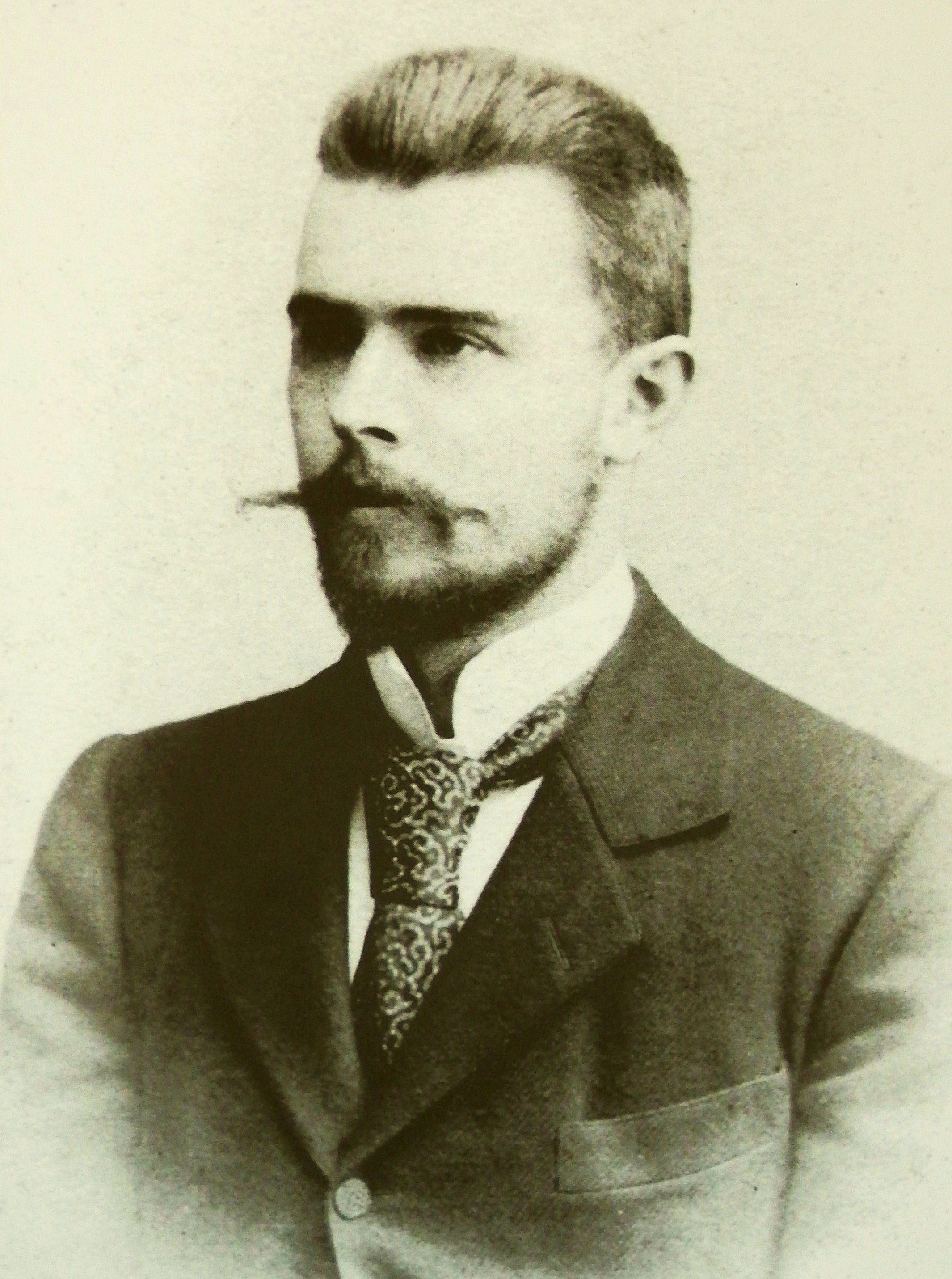
- Władysław Sadłowski, 1896
- Born: 25 June 1869; Lemberg, Austria-Hungary (now Ukraine)
- Died: 25 May 1940 (aged 70); Lviv, Ukrainian SSR, Soviet Union (now Ukraine)
- Occupation: architect
- Awards: Commander's Cross of the Order of Polonia Restituta
- Practice: Lviv Polytechnic
- Buildings: Lviv Railway Station; Lviv Philharmonic

Władysław Sadłowski (25 June 1869 – 25 May 1940) was a Polish architect, a representative of historicism and Art Nouveau and a graduate of the Lwów Technical Academy.

== Life ==
He was born on 25 June 1869 in Lemberg (Lviv in present-day Ukraine), Kingdom of Galicia and Lodomeria (part of the Austro-Hungarian Empire), to father Wiktor, who worked as an architect, and mother Maria (née Rawska), who also hailed from a well-established family of Lviv architects. After graduating from secondary school he studied architecture at the Lviv Polytechnic (1888-1892) and subsequently at the Technical University in Vienna (1892-1894). Upon completion of his studies, he became an assistant to Oswald Gruber at the university (1894-1896) and at the same time he further continued his education under Karl König. He received his diploma from the Lviv Polytechnic in 1897.

He started working as an architect first in Zygmunt Gorgolewski's team where he participated in creating the interior design of the Lviv Theatre of Opera and Ballet (1899), then in Ivan Levynskyi's and Wincenty Rawski's architectural studios and finally as an independent architect. His early works represent historicism, nonetheless his style, influenced by Viennese architect Otto Wagner, quickly developed into Art Nouveau making him one of the most distinguished representatives of this style in the architecture of Lviv.

In 1888, Sadłowski was delegated to design a new railway station for the city of Lviv, which became a turning point in his career as an architect. The construction of the building was supervised by the Director of Lviv Railways Ludwik Wierzbicki.

The final project, prepared in less than a year, encompassed a large, horizontally-oriented main hall, with two large train yards located in the background. The main entrance was topped with a large dome made of bolted steel and stained glass. Both wings of the symmetrical building were constituted by two pavilions, each with a smaller cupola. He collaborated with many prominent architects and sculptors from Lviv at the time including Alfred Zachariewicz, Antoni Popiel and Edmund Zieleniewski who worked on the interior design of the railway station as well as its façade.

Some of his other projects in Lviv include: Industrial School Building (47 Snopkowska Street), 1907–1908, the rebuilding of Baczewski residence, 1908 Z. Rozwadowski's Villa, 1905 and the Lviv Philharmonic, 1905-1908.

Sadłowski was a member of the Polish Polytechnic Society in Lviv (Polskie Towarzystwo Politechniczne we Lwowie), as well as the Circle of Polish Architects, and served on the jury for competitions organized by the latter. He was part of the committee for the first Exhibition of Polish Architects, which took place from September to November 1910.

In 1936, he was awarded the Commander's Cross of the Order of Polonia Restituta.

He died on 25 May 1940 and was buried at the Lychakiv Cemetery in the tomb of the Rawski family.

== Personal life ==
Sadłowski was interested in music and already as a student he sang as a tenor in Lviv's Opera. He was a member of the Lutnia Singing Society and he particularly admired the works of Stanisław Moniuszko. He was also a passionate nature lover and a hunter. He bought an estate near Brzeżany where he settled in 1934 upon his retirement. The estate was later confiscated by the Soviet troops in 1939.

He had two brothers: Henryk (a court judge) and Stanisław (a city council official) as well as a sister Maria. He married Jadwiga (née Wolska) with whom he had two daughters: Władysława (a hydrogeologist) and Kazimiera (a physician).

He was a friend of the first prime minister of the Second Polish Republic, Jędrzej Moraczewski.

== Gallery ==
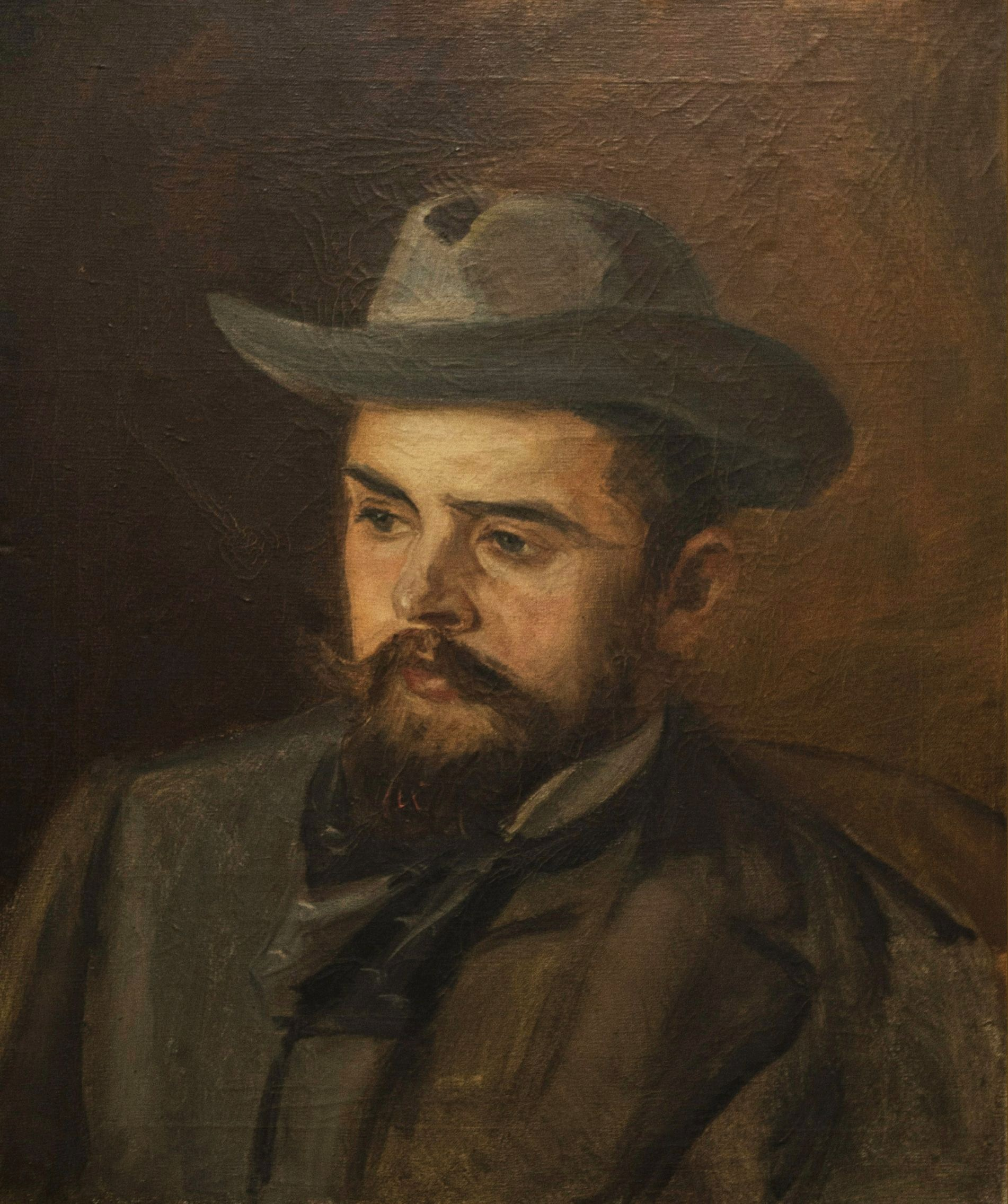
Portrait of Władysław Sadłowski by Kazimierz Pochwalski, 1895

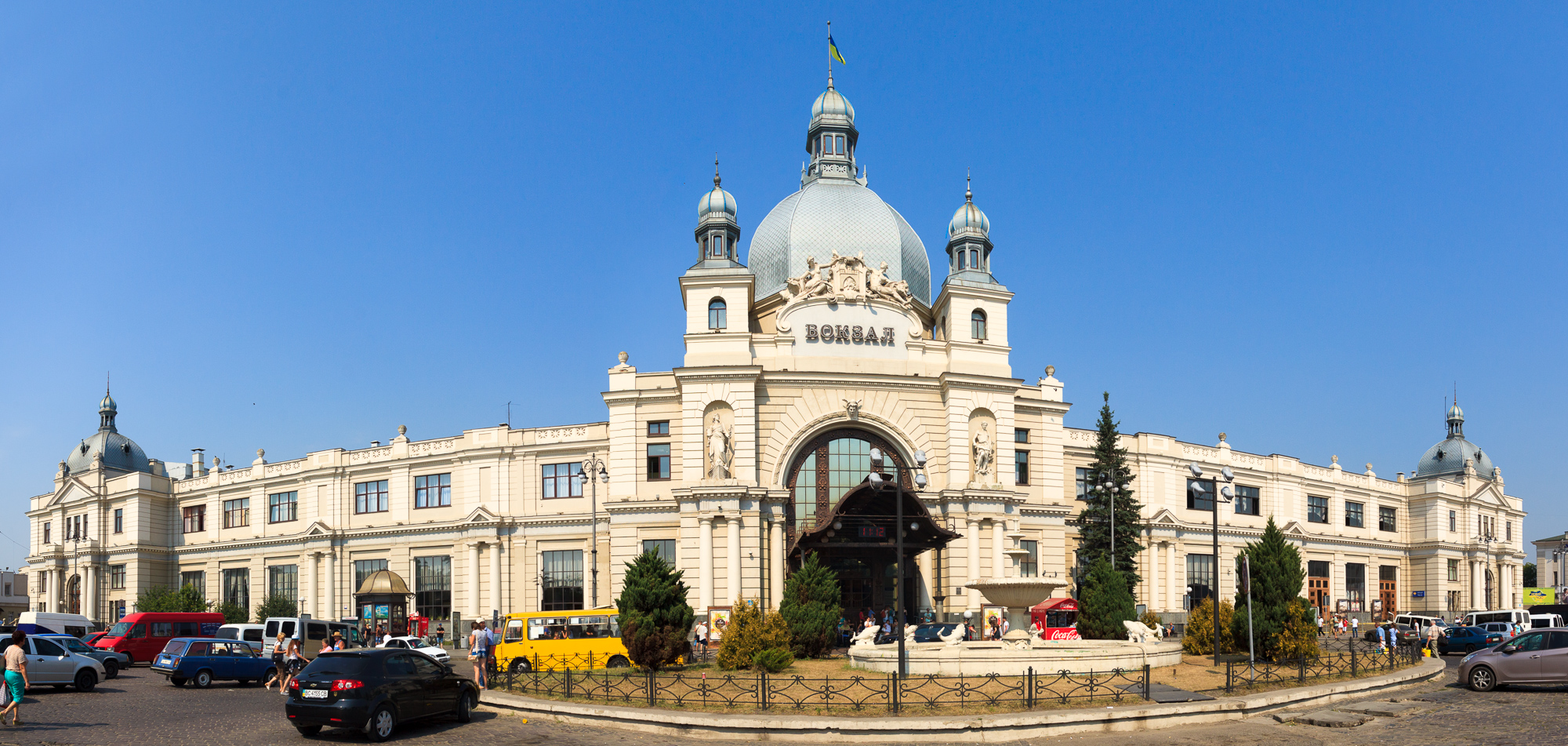
Lviv Railway Station

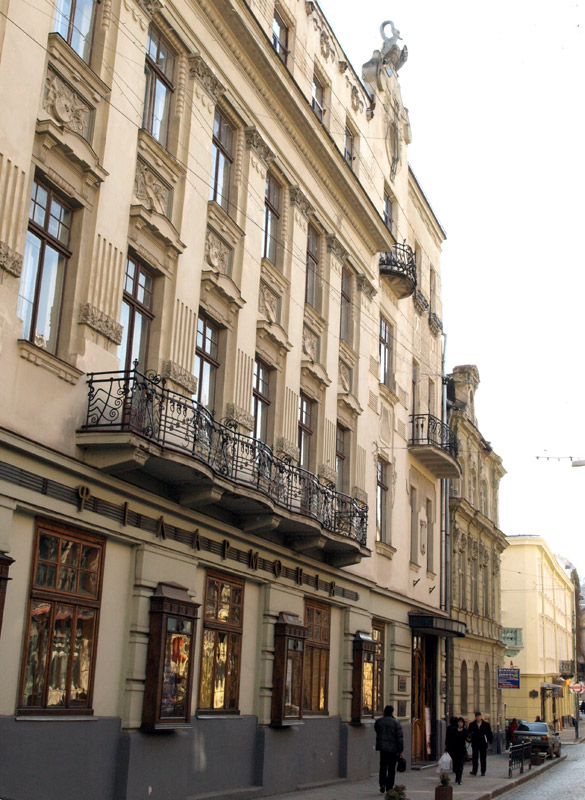
Lviv's Philharmonic

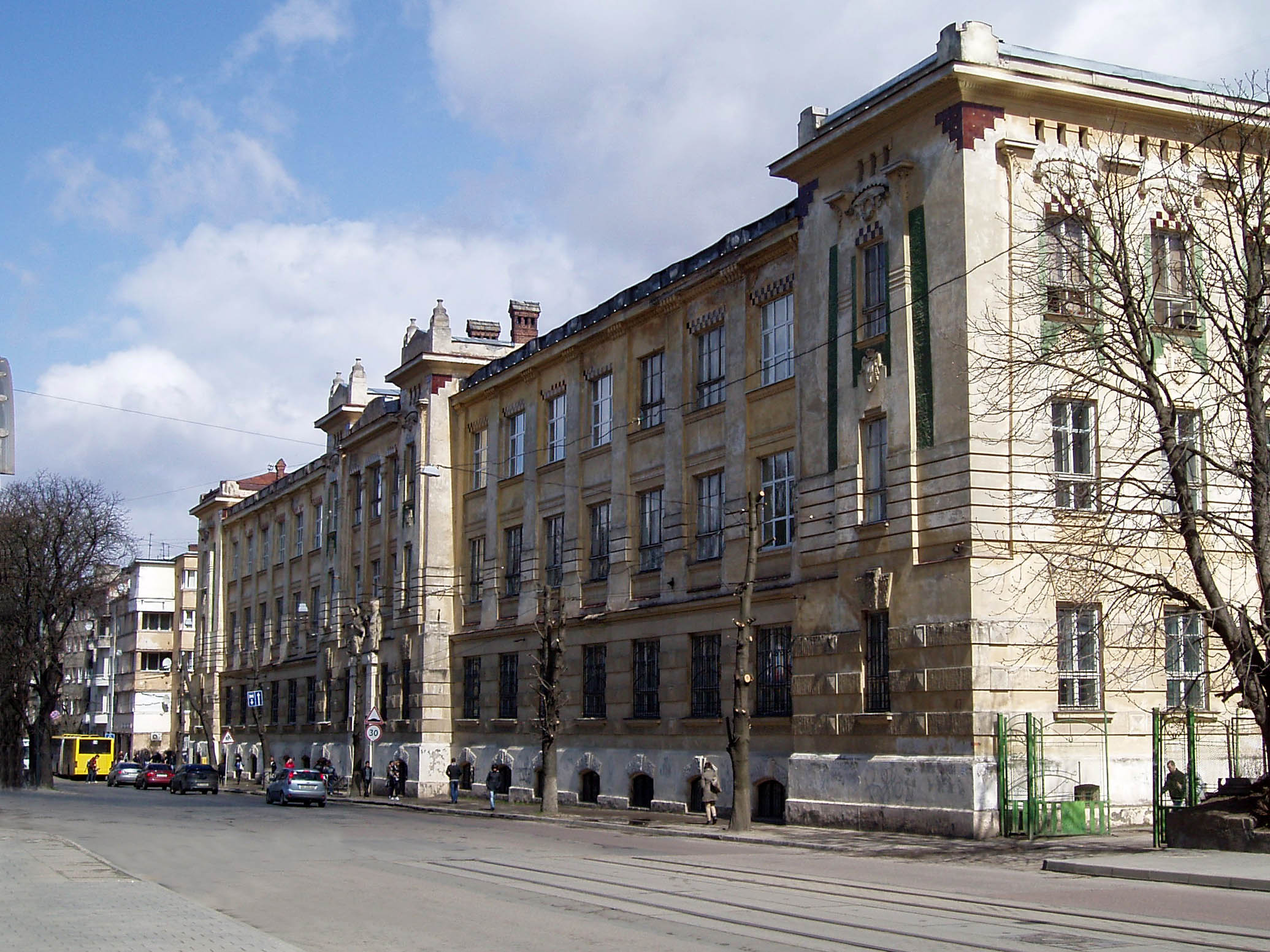
Industrial School, Lviv

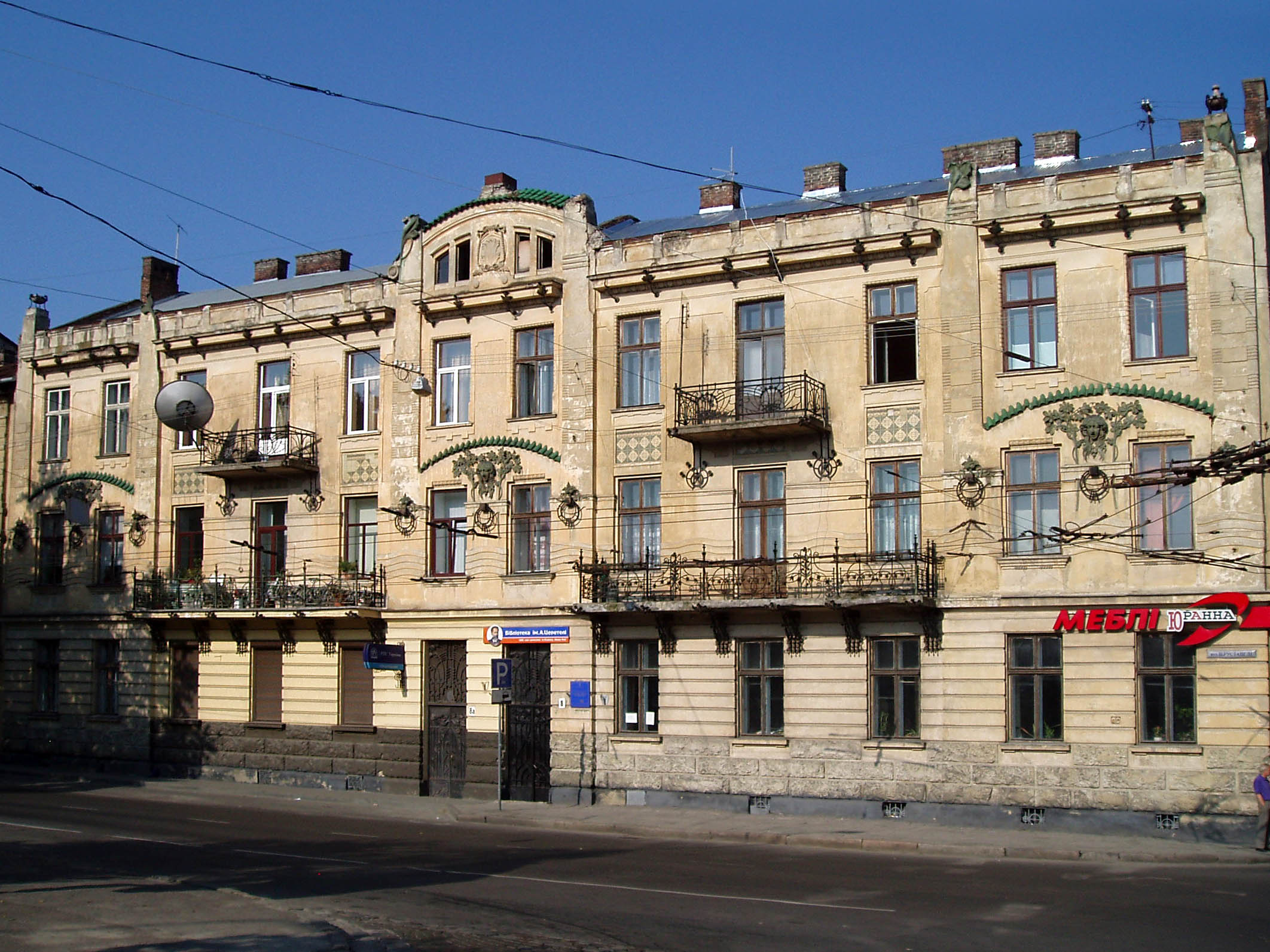
M. Stoff Townhouse, Lviv

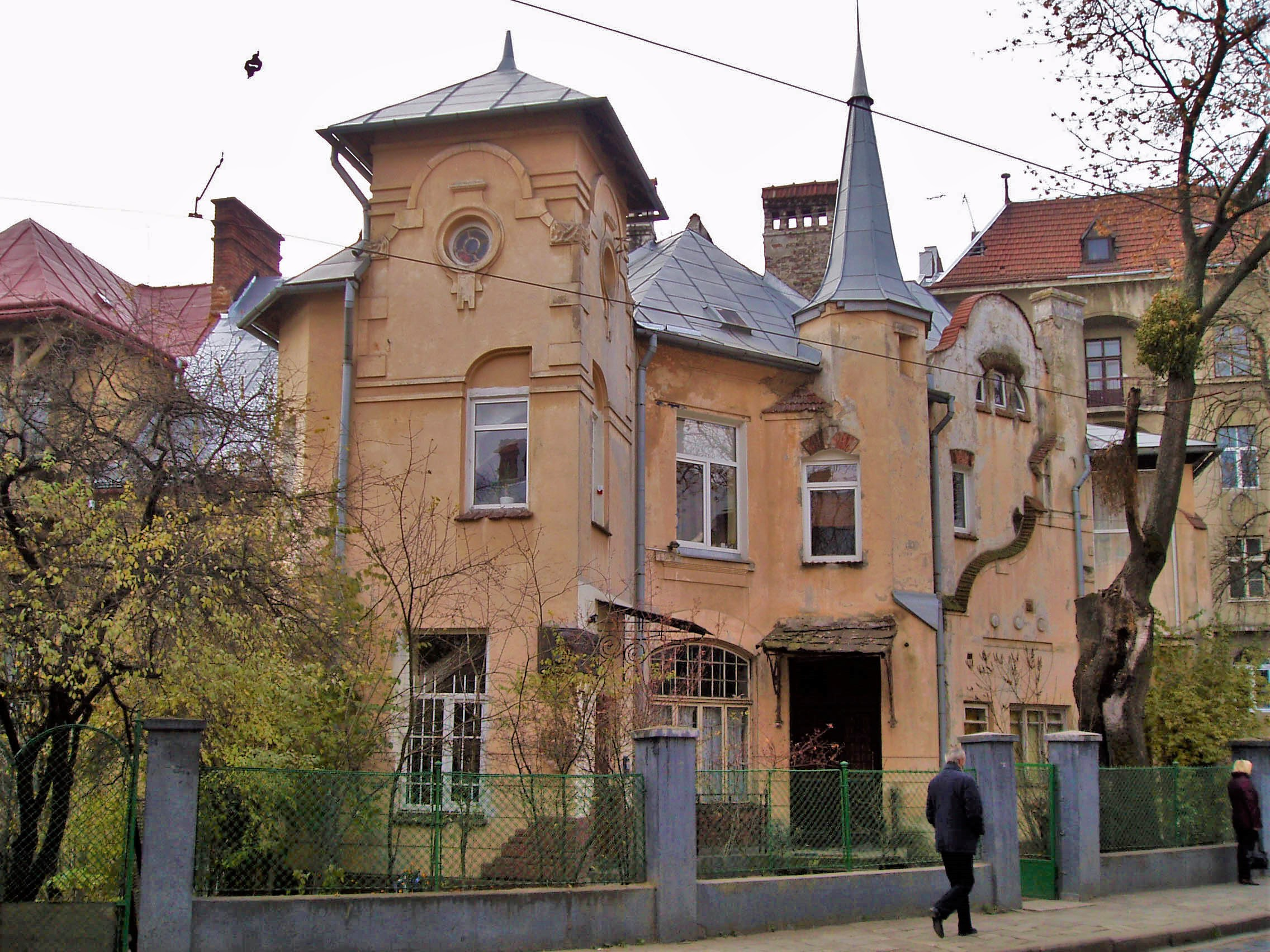
Z. Rozwadowski's Villa, Lviv

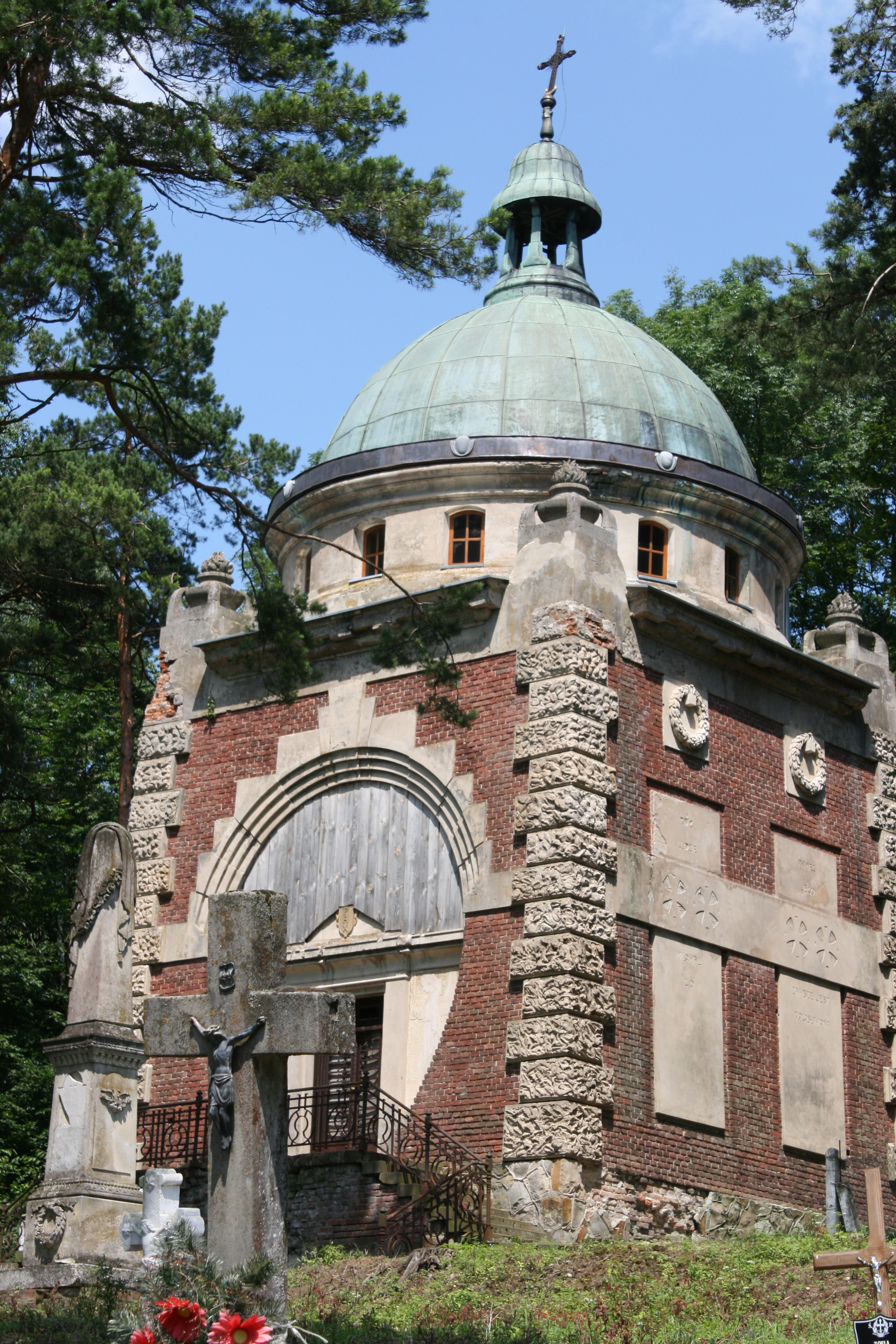
Hulimka family vault in Myców

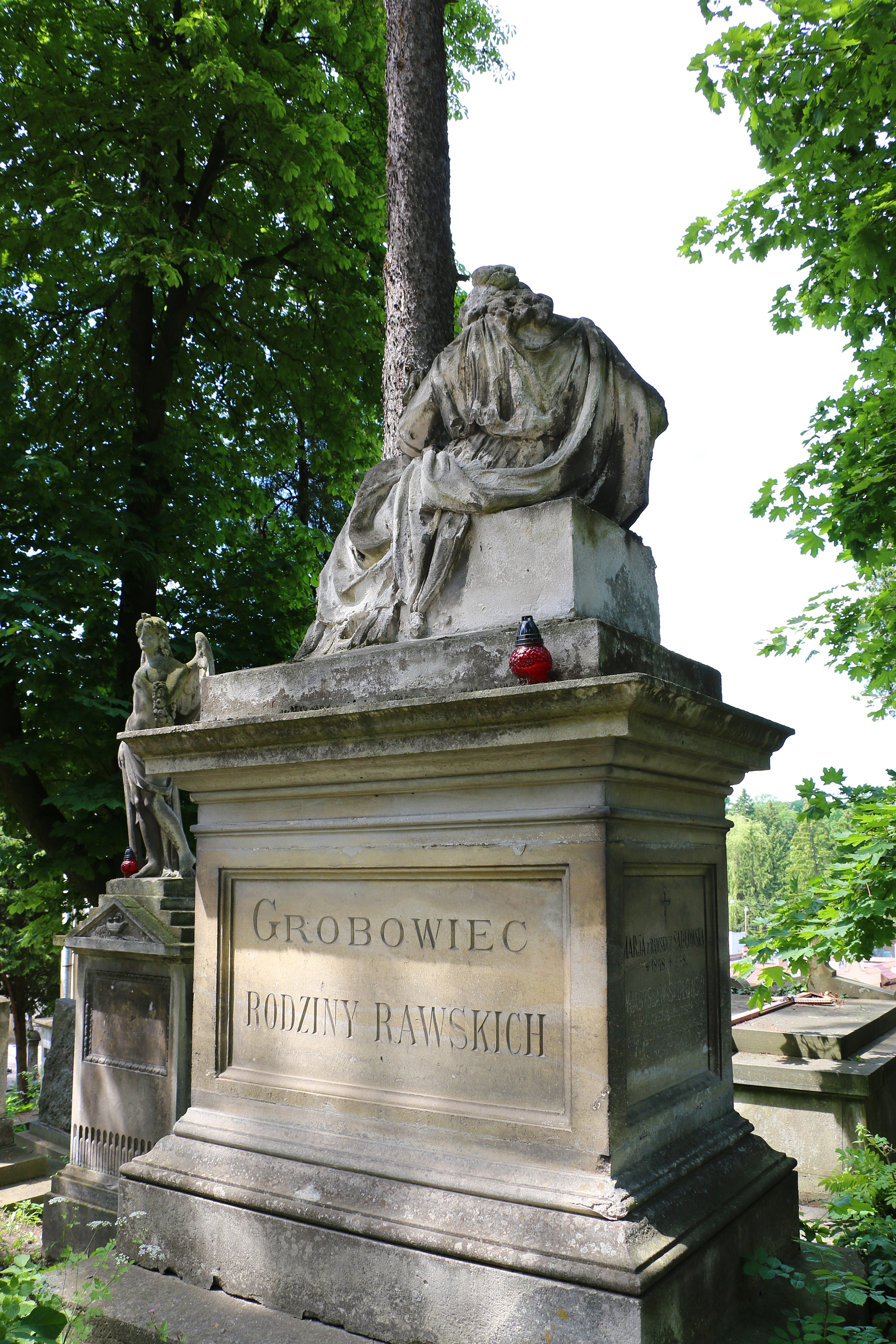
Tomb of the Rawski family, Lviv
