= Kramatorsk railway station =

Railway station in Kramatorsk, Ukraine

Kramatorsk Краматорськ
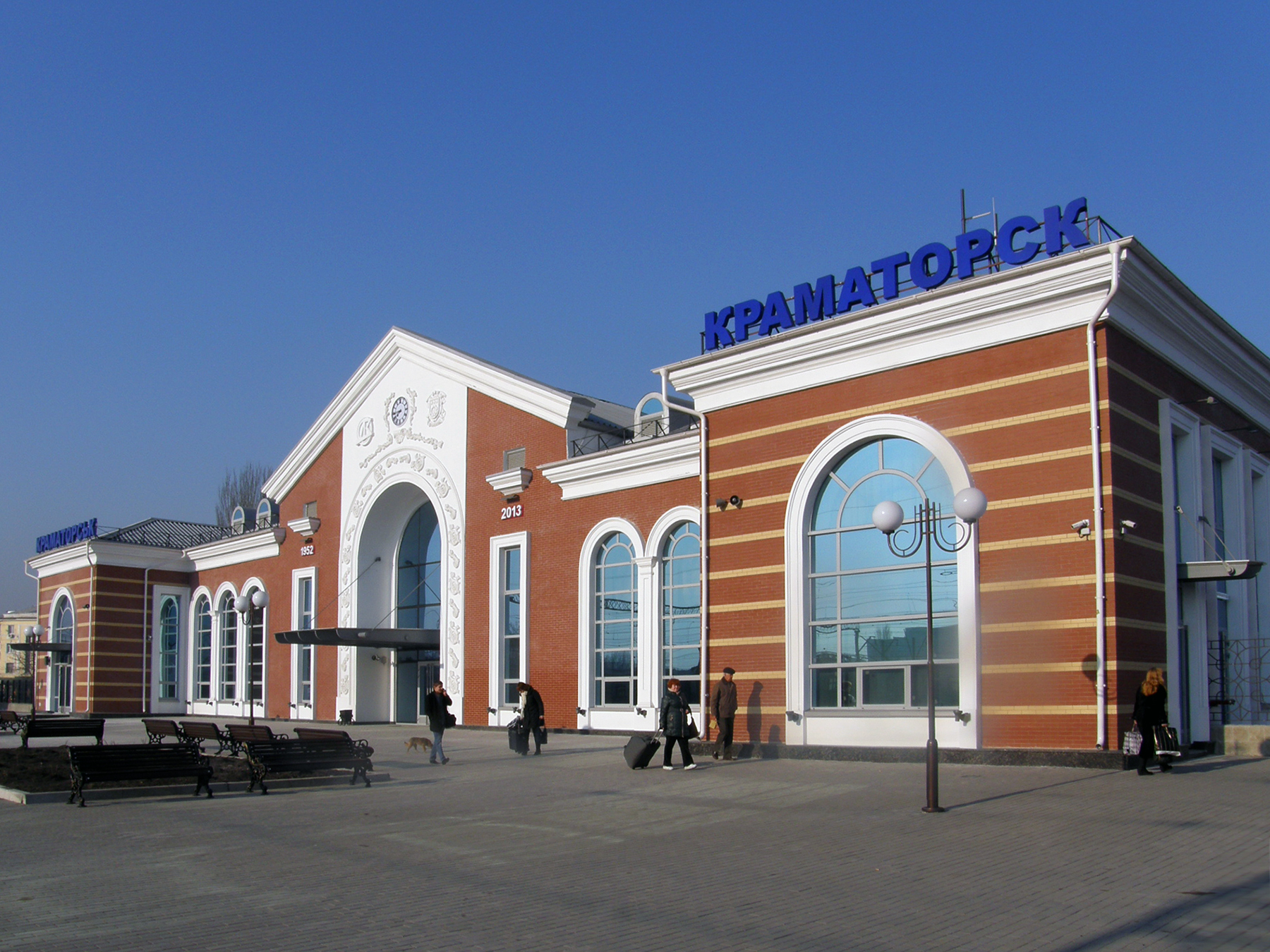
- Kramatorsk station

General information
- Location: Donetsk Oblast; Ukraine
- Coordinates: 48.7259°N 37.5431°E
- Train operators: Donets Railway

History
- Opening: 1868

Services
Preceding station	Ukrainian Railways	Following station
Druzhkivka toward Kyiv-Pasazhyrskyi	IC 712K / 712D	Terminus
Sloviansk toward Odesa-Holovna	Yellow Ribbon	Terminus
Sloviansk toward Lviv	Invincibility	Terminus
Prokatchyk toward Lozova-Pasazhyrskyi or Izium	Donets Railway; Lymanskaya (DH-2)	KMZ Gate toward Sloviansk
Location

Kramatorsk railway station (Ukrainian: Залізни́чна ста́нція Крамато́рськ) is a railway station in Kramatorsk, Ukraine, maintained by Donets Railway. It is located at a junction of north-south, and east-west lines connecting the city to other centres in the country including Kyiv, Odesa, and Kostiantynivka.

== History ==
The station was built when construction of the railway line began in the south of Sloviansk in 1868 and the Kramatorsk site was in a suitable position, located at a junction of lines. At first the railway was a single track. It was completed in 1879 and the building, now made of stone, had two floors. In the same years the settlement grew. During World War II the historical building was destroyed and in 1952 it was rebuilt according to the design of architect Syromyatnikov. An old locomotive was placed in the station forecourt in 2021 as a monument, commemorating the model produced by the Soviet Union until 1957.

=== Russian invasion ===
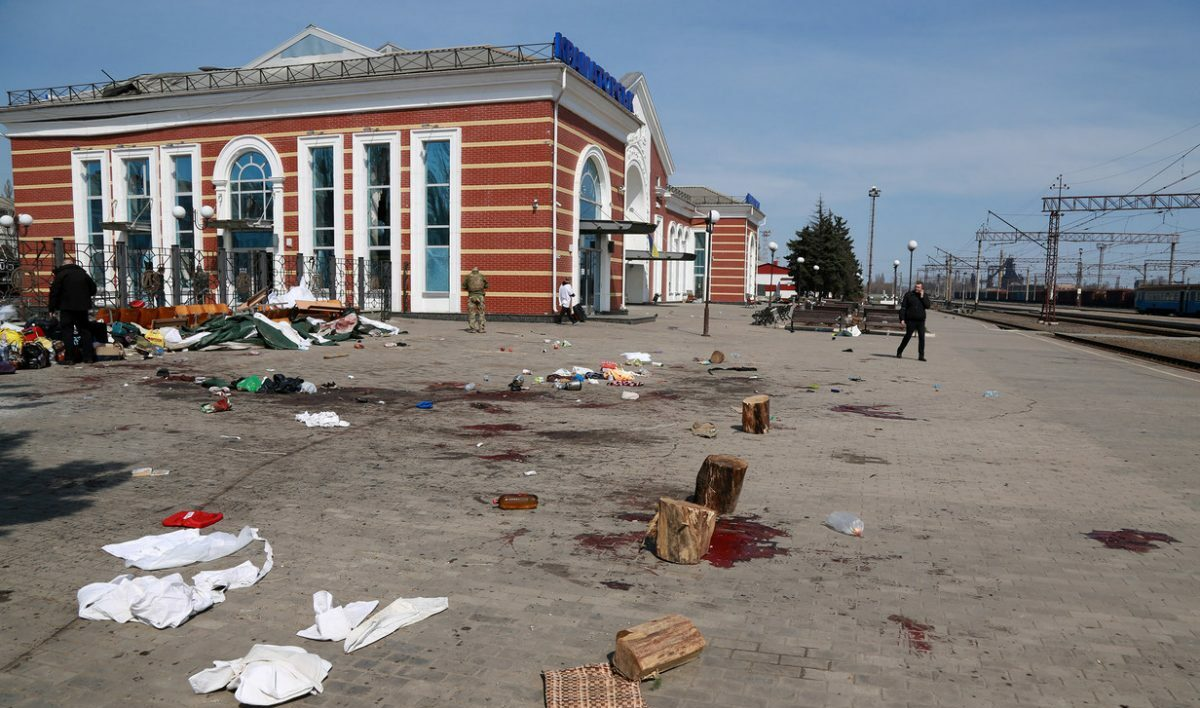
Consequences of the airstrike

The station was damaged and numerous civilians were killed and injured by the Kramatorsk railway bombing in April 2022 during the Russian invasion. The attack killed at least 50 people, who were civilians trying to evacuate.

Services to Kramatorsk was suspended until October 14, 2022. On that day, in time for Defenders Day and the Intercession of the Theotokos, a railway connection between Kyiv and Kramatorsk was restored, with the scheduling of the "Intercity+" train 712/711. The train departed Kyiv with the words "Glory to Ukraine!". On the route, the train stops at 9 intermediate stations: Darnytsia, Hrebinka, Lubny, Myrhorod, Poltava-Kyivskyi, Berestyn, Lozova, Barvinkove and Sloviansk.

== Facilities and services ==
The station operates 24 hours a day, with freight and long-distance passenger trains, suburban and regional trains. It offers the normal passenger services and holds long-distance transport documents, storage, toilets and others. Next to the station, in the Station Square, there are stops for urban public transport.

Connected to the station there are workshops for the repair and maintenance of railway equipment.
