= Odesa-Holovna railway station =

Railway station in Odesa, Ukraine

Odesa-Holovna Одеса-Головна
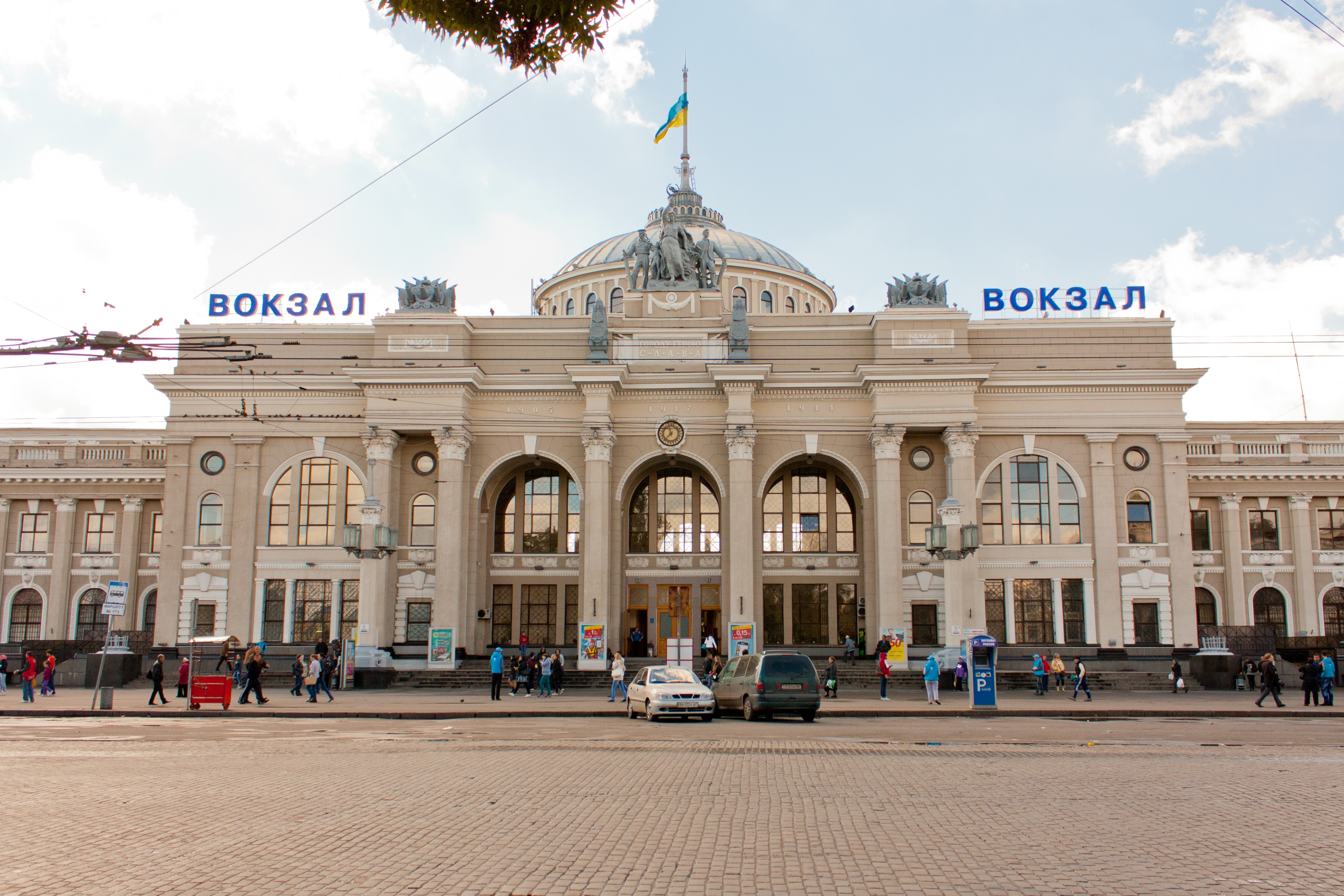
- The main building

General information
- Location: Ukraine, Odesa
- Coordinates: 46°28′4.29″N 30°44′25.46″E
- System: Odesa railway terminal
- Owner: Ukrzaliznytsia
- Platforms: 6

Construction
- Structure type: At-grade
- Architect: Victor Schröter, Leonid Chupryn

Other information
- Station code: 400216

History
- Opened: 1884
- Rebuilt: 1952
- Electrified: 1972
Location

Odesa-Holovna railway station (lit. 'Odesa-Main', Ukrainian: Одеса-Головна) is the main train station of Odesa, a city in southern Ukraine. Situated on Odesa railway junction, 9 kilometers from Odesa-Zastava I station. The original building of the station was opened in 1883. It was damaged in 1944 during World War II and rebuilt in 1952. The station was electrified in 1972.

The station is located in the city centre of Odesa. In 1982, the building of the station was included on the list of architectural monuments of local significance. In 2018, the Odesa-Holovna railway station was included in the top-10 busiest railway stations in Ukraine, serving 5.5 million long-distance passengers.

== History ==
On 15 January 1863, a decision on the construction and delegation of state funds to the Odesa — Balta Railway was approved, which would connect the port city on the Black Sea with the central regions of Ukraine. Baron Karl von Ungern-Sternberg was appointed to manage the works, while the general management was delegated to the governor of the region Paul von Kotzebue. In December 1864, it was ordered to extend the Odesa — Balta line to Kryukiv (today part of Kremenchuk).

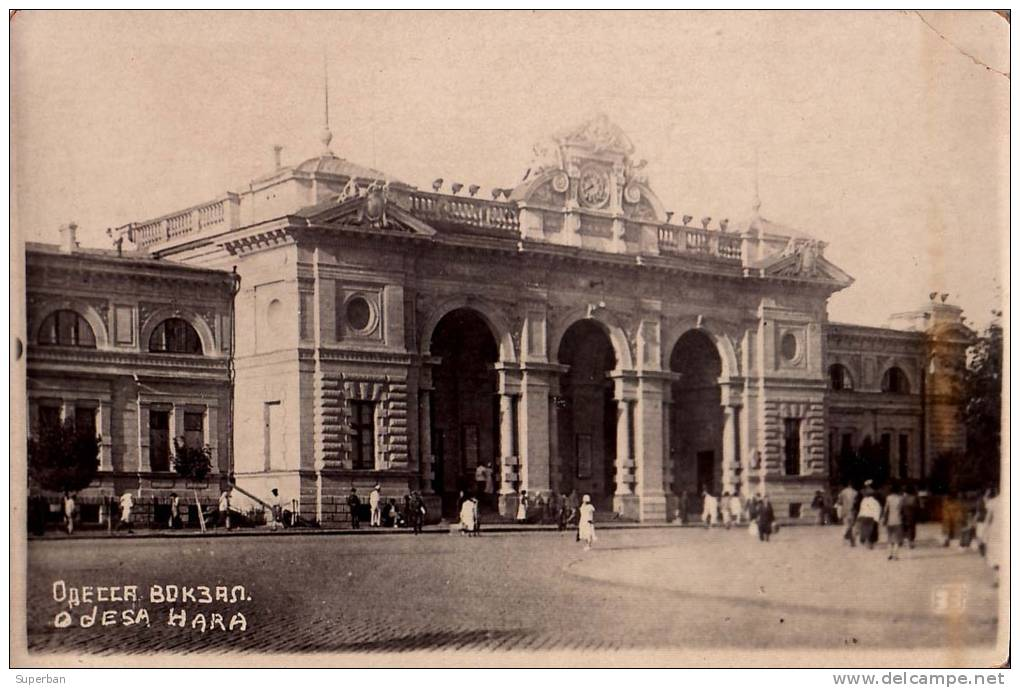
The station in 1942

Originally, passenger trains arrived at Odesa-Tovarna station, with two special transfer trains organized to the city center. On 3 November 1865, the first train from Odesa to Parkani departed the station.

Due to the old station no longer meeting the needs of the city and it being located in an inconvenient place for passengers, a decision was made to build a new station complex. In the summer of 1880, the Southwestern Railway began the construction of the new railway station.

The station was opened in 1883. The author of the project of the station building was the architect Victor Schröter, while the construction was carried out under the direction of the architect Alexander Bernardazzi. The building was constructed in a neoclassical style with Renaissance-Baroque elements. Entrances for 1st and 2nd class passengers were located on Italiiska Street, while the entrance for the 3rd class was located in Starosinna Square. Three arches of the main facade, framed by columns, opened onto the Pryvokzalna Square.

During the Second World War, the station building was blown up in the last days of the occupation of Odesa in 1944. The station restoration project was developed at the Kyivgiprotrans Institute, by the architect Leonid Chupryn. The restored station was opened on 12 July 1952.

In 1972, the station was electrified with alternating current (~25 kV)

== Facilities ==
The station has 6 passenger platforms, a luggage platform, 33 ticket booths, 8 service center booths, 8 suburban ticket booths and 16 hotel rooms. On the first floor of the station is located a waiting room for passengers with children.

On 9 December 2021, the Tourist Information Center opened at the Odesa railway station as part of the joint project of "Visit Ukraine" and the State Tourism Development Agency.

== Services ==
Odesa-Holovna railway station is a part of the operational structure of the Odesa Railways. Passenger services as of March 2025:

| Preceding station | Ukrainian Railways | Following station |
|---|---|---|
| Odesa-Mala towards Akkarzha, Rozdilna I, or Kolosivka | Odesa Railways | Terminus |
| Rozdilna toward Kramatorsk | Yellow Ribbon | Terminus |
| Rozdilna toward Chernivtsi | Chornomor | Terminus |
| Podilsk toward Kyiv-Pasazhyrskyi | Chornomorets | Terminus |
| Odesa-Skhidna toward Kyiv-Pasazhyrskyi | Khadzhybey | Terminus |
| Preceding station | Odesa urban electric transport | Following station |
| Privoz towards Bus Station | Odesa tram route 5 | Kanatnaya Street towards Arcadia |
| Privoz towards Pasteur Street | Odesa tram route 28 | Kanatnaya Street towards Shevchenko Park |

The station is served by tram routes No. 5 and 28 and trolleybuses 7, 8, 10 operated by Odesmiskelektrotrans, as well as privately operated busses and minibuses.
