= Lviv railway station =

Railway station in Lviv, Ukraine

Lviv–Holovnyi Львів–Головний
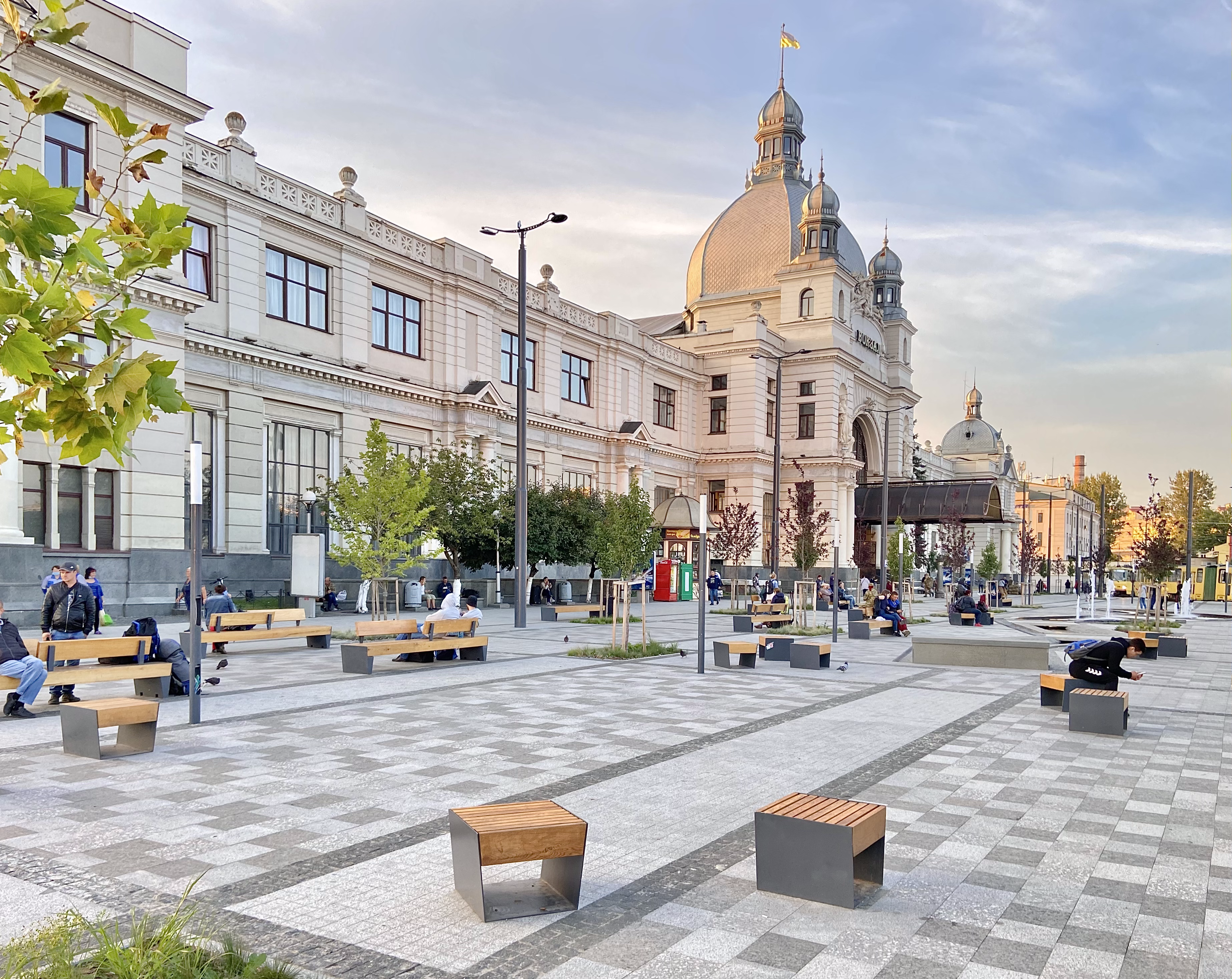
- The Lviv railway station is one of the most notable pieces of Art Nouveau architecture in former Galicia.

General information
- Location: Ukraine, Lviv
- Coordinates: 49°50′23″N 23°59′40″E
- System: Lviv Railway terminal
- Owner: Lviv Railways

Construction
- Architect: Władysław Sadłowski

History
- Opened: 1904

Services
| Preceding station | Ukrainian Railways | Following station |
|---|---|---|
| Batarivka toward Hrebenne | Hrebenne–Lviv | Terminus |
| P'yatyy Park toward Przemyśl Main | Przemyśl–Lviv | Terminus |
| Sknyliv toward Stryi | Stryi–Lviv | Terminus |
| Terminus | Lviv–Krasne | Kutkir toward Krasne |
| Terminus | Lviv–Ivano-Frankivsk | Horodots'ka toward Ivano-Frankivsk |
Long-distance trains
| Terminus | Invincibility | Ternopil toward Kramatorsk |
| Drohobych toward Truskavets | Evening Dawns | Ternopil toward Kharkiv |
| Preceding station | ÖBB | Following station |
| Stryi towards Wien Hbf | Schnellzug | Kyiv Terminus |

Immovable Monument of Local Significance of Ukraine
- Official name: Будинок Центрального залізничного вокзалу (Central railway station building)
- Type: Architecture
- Reference no.: 4350-Лв
Location

Lviv–Holovnyi railway station (Ukrainian: Льві́в–Головни́й) is the main railway terminal in Lviv, Ukraine. It is one of the most notable pieces of Art Nouveau architecture in former Galicia. The station was opened to the public in 1904, and celebrated its centenary on 26 March 2004. On a monthly basis, the terminal handles over 1.2 million passengers and moves 16 thousand tons of freight.

== History ==
Construction of an extensive network of railways within the Austro-Hungarian Empire allowed the city of Lemberg (its German name at the time) to retain its nodal position at the crossing of several notable trade routes. As the capital of Galicia, the city needed a new, representative and large railway station that would suit the city needs and replace the old neo-Gothic railway station built between 1861 and 1862 with the Galician Railway of Archduke Charles Louis.

In 1888 the Polish architect and a graduate of the Lwów Technical Academy Władysław Sadłowski was selected to design a new station. The final project, prepared in less than a year, encompassed a large, horizontally-oriented main hall, with two large train yards located in the background. The main entrance was topped with a large dome made of bolted steel and stained glass. Both wings of the symmetrical building were constituted by two pavilions, each with a smaller cupola.

The main entrance was flanked by a set of Tuscan columns and large mythological sculptures, with the one representing Hypnos being the most notable. Since Sadłowski was the main representative of the William Morris' Arts and Crafts movement in Poland, his project included not only the architectural part of the future building, but also the ornaments and decorations. The project of three waiting halls (one for each class of travellers) was prepared in cooperation with another graduate of Sadłowski's alma mater, Alfred Zachariewicz.

The first class waiting hall was modelled after the style of an English gentleman's club, and was equipped with dark, luxurious Viennese-style furniture, resembling the works of the Wiener Werkstätte. The second class waiting room was modelled after 19th century burgher houses in Galicia, while the third class waiting hall was equipped with simple wooden pieces of furniture, modelled after the Zakopane style of Polish Gorals made by the artist Tadeusz Obmiński.

The ornaments featured in the tunnels leading to the platforms and in the platforms themselves were prepared by the Kraków-based company of Józef Górecki. Made of bent steel, the balustrades and railings bore direct resemblance to the style of the Paris Métro ornaments designed by Hector Guimard. A design for the registers was constructed in Zieleniewski Maschinen und Wagonbau-Gesellschaft Werk Sanok (Autosan).

Construction started in 1899 and lasted until 1904, when the railway station was opened to the public. It was visited by some of the most renowned architects of the epoch, and influenced the later construction of the train stations in Prague (Josef Fanta, 1909) and Vienna (Otto Wagner).

During World War II, when the city was under the rule of the Soviet Union, the occupied eastern Poland railways were integrated into the Soviet Railway system. The station suffered extensive damage during the war, including a completely destroyed trainshed. There was an open debate on whether to restore the building or to dismantle the ruins and build anew. Architect G.F. Domashenko managed to bring both parties to agreement, and between 1949 and 1953 the old structure was given a contemporary Stalinist interior, whilst a full repair on the outside preserved its original view.

Frequent renovations and upgrades ensured that the service and building was always up to modern standards, a tradition which Ukraine continued through the 1990s and into the 21st century, with the most recent major restoration being carried out in 2003.

== Gallery ==
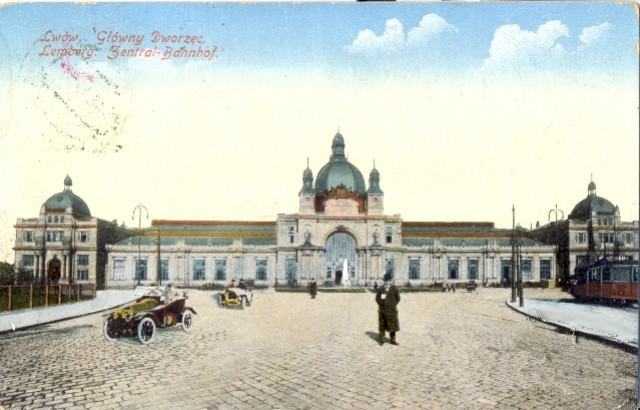
Postcard of the station, circa 1915

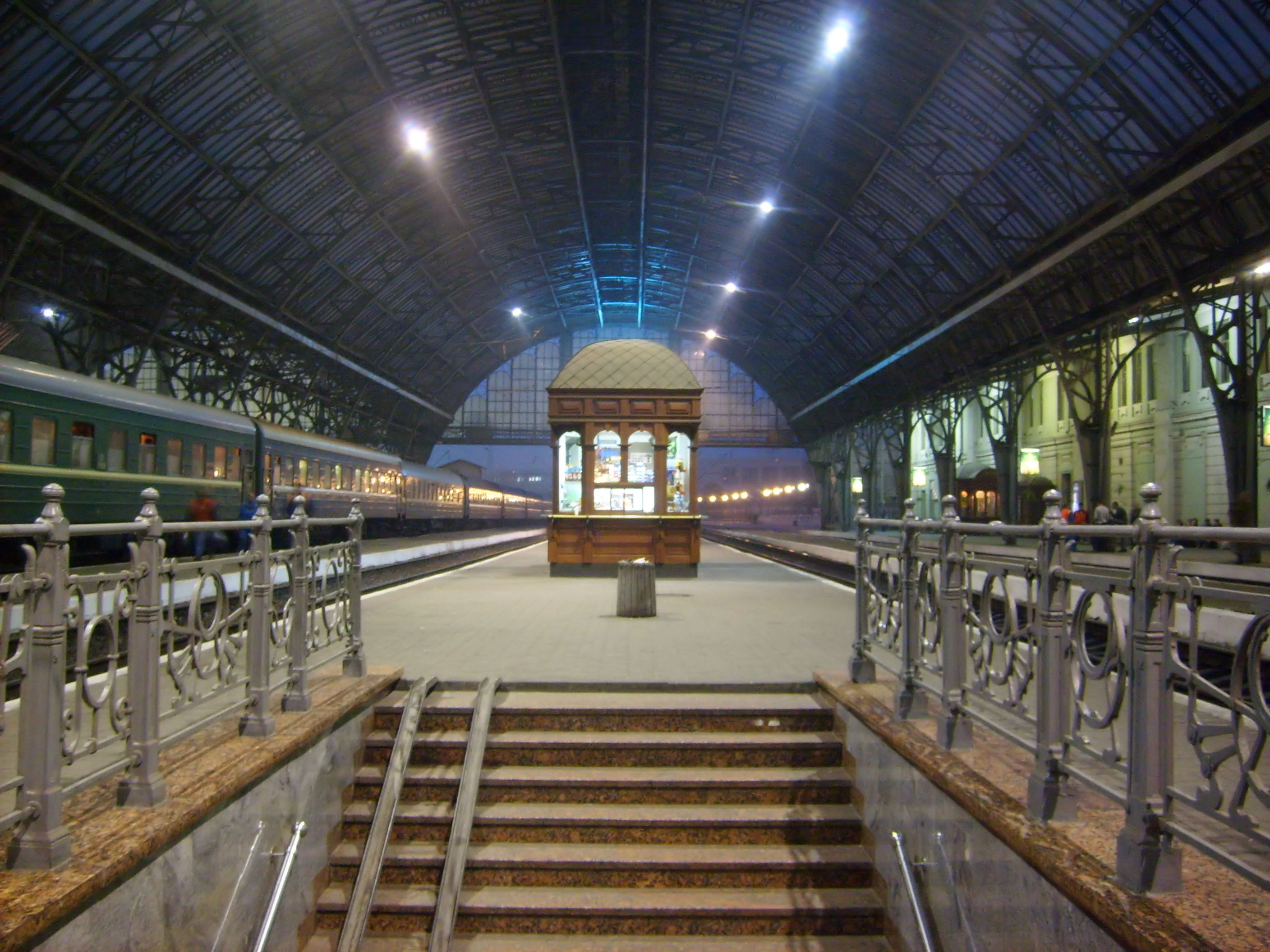
The platforms as seen in 2007

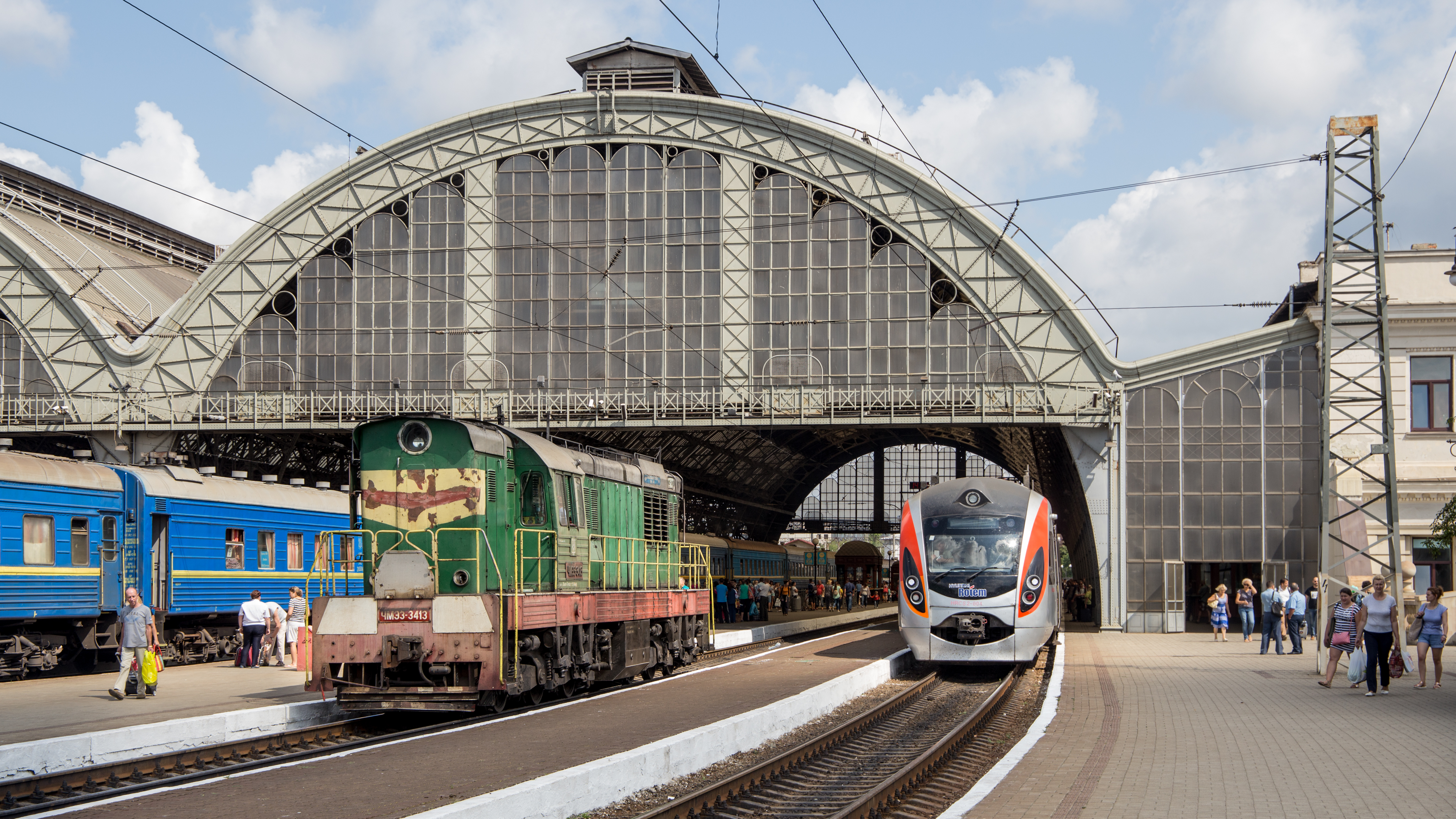
Roof over the railway tracks

== See also ==
- Lviv Suburban Rail Terminal
