= List of railway stations in Ukraine =

This is a list of railway stations in Ukraine.

== Busiest stations ==
This is a list of the top 10 busiest railway stations in Ukraine, based on statistics and data received on the year of 2018. The data include only passengers of long-distance trains.

Rank	Railway Station	Annual traffic	Number of platforms	City	Oblast	Photograph
1	Kyiv-Pasazhyrskyi	23.4	7	Kyiv	Kyiv City	
2	Lviv	8.3	5	Lviv	Lviv Oblast	
3	Kharkiv	5.7	9	Kharkiv	Kharkiv Oblast	
4	Odesa	5.5	6	Odesa	Odesa Oblast	
5	Dnipro	3.3	6	Dnipro	Dnipropetrovsk Oblast	
6	Vinnytsia	2.6	3	Vinnytsia	Vinnytsia Oblast	
7	Zaporizhzhia-1	2.1	4	Zaporizhzhia	Zaporizhzhia Oblast	
8	Ivano-Frankivsk	1.6	3	Ivano-Frankivsk	Ivano-Frankivsk Oblast	
9	Khmelnytskyi	1.6	4	Khmelnytskyi	Khmelnytskyi Oblast	
10	Kherson	1.5	4	Kherson	Kherson Oblast	

== Southwestern Railways ==
=== Kyiv branch ===
Stations

- Baryshivka
- Berezan
- Bilychi
- Bobryk
- Bobrovytsia
- imeni Borysa Oliynyka
- Boryspil
- Boryspil-Airport
- Borodyanka
- Borshchahivka
- Borshchahivka-Tekhnichna
- Boyarka
- Brovary
- Bucha
- Buyan
- Chernihiv
- Chernihiv-Pivnichnyi
- Darnytsia
- Halyne
- imeni Heorhiy Kirpy
- Holubychi
- Hornostayivka
- Hrybova Rudnia
- Hrushky
- Irpin
- Kaharlyk
- Khalyavyn
- Klavdiyevo
- Kobyzhcha
- Kolychivka
- Kononivka
- Kyiv-Demiivksyi
- Kyiv-Lisky
- Kyiv-Pasazhyrskyi
- Kyiv-Tovarnyi
- Kyiv-Volynskyi
- Lypiv Rih
- Maryanika
- Motovylivka
- Muraviyka
- Mykilska Slobidka
- Nedanchychi
- Nemishayeve
- Nizhyn
- Nosivka
- Novi Bezradychi
- Ozernyi
- Pereyaslavska
- Petro Kryvonis
- Pidhirtsi
- Pochaina
- Rasava
- Slavutych
- Spartak
- Svyatoshyn
- Teteriv
- Trypillia-Dniprovske
- Vasylkiv 1
- Vasylkiv-Center
- Veresoch
- Vertiyivka
- Vyshneve
- Yahotyn
- Yolcha
- Zavorychi
- Zhukotky

Stops

- 45 kilomenter
- 71 kilomenter
- Almaz
- Anisove
- Baklanove
- Beresteiska
- Berezniaky
- Bilky
- Bilous
- Bohdanivka
- Chernyakhivskyi
- Chubynskyi
- Danylivka
- Darnytsia-Depot
- Demiyka
- Doslidna
- Drimailivka
- Dymerka
- DVRZ
- Farmatsevtychna
- Hlevakha
- Hlynianka
- Hordyn
- Karavayevi Dachi
- Khmelyovyk
- Khutir Hai
- Khutoryanka
- Kicheyeve
- Knyazhychi
- Korzhi
- Korchi
- Kosmichna
- Kuchakove
- Kurenivka
- Kvitnevyi
- Levkovychi
- Lisnyky
- Lisnytstvo
- Lisova Bucha
- Livoberezhna
- Lozy
- Makarivka
- Makiychukove
- Mala Oleksandrivka
- Mala Stroyivka
- Maliyky
- Malyutianka
- Markivtsi
- Maryanivska
- Myhalivka
- Nifar
- Nizhynske
- Novobilychi
- Novotroyanda
- Oleshnia
- Osnyaky
- Parnykova
- Peresadochna
- Piskivka
- Pivni
- Poliskyi
- Polyove
- Priorka
- Prospekt Nauky
- Protasiv Yar
- Pustovity
- Raiduzhnyi
- Rankovyi
- Romankiv
- Rusanivka
- Salychivka
- Selyshche Lisove
- Semykhody
- Semypolky
- Shcherbanivka
- Shlyakhova
- Shumlai
- Sichovykh Striltsiv
- Sklozavodska
- Sloboda-Petrivka
- Sorochyi Brid
- Stuhna
- Syrets
- Tarasivka
- Tatsenky
- Travneva
- Trubizh
- Volodkova Divytsia
- Vorzel
- Voskresenka
- Vydubychi
- Vydubychi-Trypilski
- Vyshnyaky
- Yalynka
- Yaroslavka
- Zahaltsi
- Zamhlai
- Zasupoyivka
- Zayachi Sosny
- Zdorivka
- Zherdova
- Zhukivka
- Zirka

Switch points

- 7 kilometer
- 17 kilometer
- 19 kilometer
- 837 kilometer

=== Kozyatyn branch ===
Stations

- Berdychiv
- Berdychiv-Zhytomyrskyi
- Bila Tserkva
- Bilhorodka
- Bohuslav
- Brivky
- Chornorudka
- Chudniv-Volynskyi
- Denhofivka
- Fastiv 1
- Fastiv 2
- Ivachkiv
- Izyaslav
- Karapyshi
- Khrolyn
- Klembivka
- Kozhanka
- Kozyatyn 1
- Kozyatyn 2
- Kryvyn
- Lepesivka
- Makharyntsi
- Mohyliany
- Myronivka
- Myropil
- Mykhailenky
- Olshanytsia
- Ostroh
- Pechanivka
- Pohrebyshche 1
- Polonne
- Poninka
- Popilnia
- Post Zhlobynskyi
- Razine
- Rokytne
- Rotok
- Rzhevuska
- Selo-Kamianka
- Sestrynivka
- Shepetivka
- Shepetivka-Podilska
- Siltse
- Skvyra
- Slavuta 1
- Slavuta 2
- Sudylkiv
- Sukhvolia
- Sukholisy
- Tetiyiv
- Tsvitokha
- Ustymivka
- Zarudyntsi
- Zhashkiv
- Zhyzhnykivtsi

Stops

- 4 kilometer
- 8 kilometer
- Andrusove
- Badivka
- Baranne
- Bilohirya
- Bilosillia
- Biryuky
- Blydni
- Brykivskyi
- Busheve
- Chepeliyivka
- Cherniachyi Khutir
- Chernyavka
- Hai
- Hannusyne
- Hlukhivtsi
- Hordiyivka
- Horoshkiv
- Demchyn
- Derhanivka
- Dertka
- Dovbyshche
- Drutska
- Dviretskyi
- Dzyunkiv
- Ivankivtsi
- Kaolinova
- Karapyshi 2
- Kharliyivka
- Klubivka
- Kolodyazhnyi
- Kolomye
- Kryvchunka
- Lyutarskyi
- Myroslavka
- Mykhnivka
- Nakaznyi Post
- Novychi
- Palianychyntsi
- Planovyi
- Plesna
- Plyskiv
- Polyany
- Pryputni
- imeni Pyaskorskoho
- Rachky
- Raiky
- Ros
- Rostavytsia
- Rozkopane
- Sadovyi
- Savertsi
- Savychi
- Semylitka
- Slobidskyi Post
- Snitynka
- Staroustentsi
- Tomylivka
- Trylisy
- Ukrayinka
- Vakulenchuk
- Varyvodky
- Vchoraishe
- Vernyhorodok
- Vilshanytsia
- Vysoke
- Yuskivtsi
- Zaliznychne
- Zhylyntsi
- Zhytni Hory

== A ==
- Ambary
- Amur
- Armiansk

== B ==
- Balta
- Baraboi
- Batovo
- Beskyd
- Bila Krynytsia
- Borzhava railway station
- Brovary
- Bucha
- Burshtyn
- Bystra

== C ==
- Chernivtsi
- Chop
- Chornyi Ostriv
- Chortkiv

== D ==
- Dachne
- Darnytsia
- Dnipro-Holovnyi
- Donetsk
- Dubove
- Dzhankoi railway station

== F ==
- Fastiv I
- Fastiv II
- Fedorivka

== H ==
- Hannivka
- Hirnyk
- Holendry
- Hornostaivka
- Horodok

== I ==
- Ivanivka
- Ivano-Frankivsk
- Izvaryne

== K ==
- Kalush
- Kalynivka
- Karavaievi Dachi
- Karpaty
- Kazanka
- Kerch railway station
- Kharkiv-Pasazhirskyi
- Khorol
- Kopai
- Korolivka
- Korsun
- Kosari
- Kovel
- Kozhanka
- Krasne
- Kryvyi Rih-Holovnyi
- Kuchurhan
- Kyiv-Pasazhyrskyi
- Khyriv railway station

== L ==
- Larga
- Lozova
- Lubny
- Luhansk
- Lviv
- Lviv Suburban
- Lyman

== M ==
- Mahala
- Marianivka
- Melitopol-Pas
- Mena
- Motovylivka
- Mykolaiv

== N ==
- Nikopol
- Novooleksiivka
- Novoselivka

== O ==
- Odesa
- Oleksandrivka
- Ozeriany
- Ozernyi
- Ozhydiv-Olesko

== P ==
- Pidzamche
- Poltava-Kyivska
- Poltava-Pivdenna
- Port Krym railway station
- Protasiv Yar

== S ==
- Sevastopol railway station
- Shabo
- Shepetivka
- Shevchenko
- Sil
- Simferopol
- Sofiivka
- Solovka
- Stavchany
- Sula
- Sumy-Tovarna
- Syrovatka
- Sambir railway station

== T ==
- Tropa
- Turka

== U ==
- Uhryniv
- Ukrainka
- Ukrainska
- Ushytsia
- Uzhhorod

== V ==
- Vadul-Siret
- Veselyi Podil
- Yevpatoria railway station
- Vladislavovka railway station
- Vorokhta

== Y ==
- Yahodyn
- Yampil
- Yaniv
