= Khmelnytskyi railway station =

Main railway station in the Ukrainian city of Khmelnytskyi

Khmelnytskyi Хмельницький
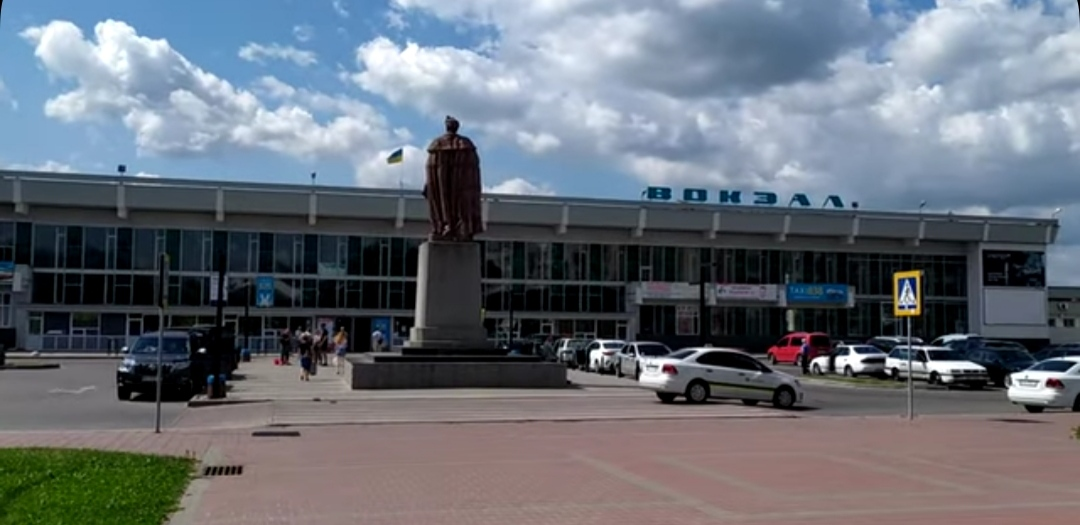
- Front view of the railway station

General information
- Location: Khmelnytskyi; Khmelnytskyi Oblast, Ukraine
- Coordinates: 49°24′59″N 27°00′35″E
- System: Southwestern Railways station
- Operator: Southwestern Railways
- Distance: 358 kilometres (222 mi) from Kyiv
- Platforms: 4

Other information
- Station code: 330704

History
- Opened: 1871

Services
Preceding station	Ukrainian Railways	Following station
Rakove towards Zhmerynka-Podilsky	Koziatyn I-Vinnytsia	Kamyanets'ske Pereyizd towards Hrechany
Ternopil toward Lviv	Invincibility	Vinnytsia toward Kramatorsk
Ternopil toward Truskavets	Evening Dawns	Vinnytsia toward Kharkiv
Location

Khmelnytskyi railway station (Ukrainian: Станція Хмельницький) is the main railway station in the Ukrainian city of Khmelnytskyi. It first opened in 1870, and is a part of Southwestern Railways.

According to the "Investment Atlas of Ukraine", the station receives around 1.6 million passengers every year.

== Name ==
The station was called Proskuriv when it was first built. Later in 1955, the station followed the city and changed its name to Khmelnytskyi.

== History ==
In 1871, the station was built as part of a rail line between Zhmerynka and Volochysk.

However, the station initially received very little passengers due to its relative obscurity in the network. It improved in 1914 when a new Kamianets-Podilskyi-Shepetivka line made the station a railway hub.

The station was severely damaged during the German-Soviet War, and was rebuilt in the 1950s.

The station was again renovated in the 1980s.

In the 1990s, local residents set up a marketplace near the station to sell various goods. The market eventually closed down after 15 years because of an administrative decision.

In 1994, the station was electrified with alternating current.

On November 7, 2017, a memorial plaque of Ukrainian statesman Mykhailo Hrushevsky, made by sculptor Roman Albul, was unveiled on the facade of the railway station.

In 2018, the railway station was ranked as the 9th busiest railway station in Ukraine.

In 2021, there were plans for a future national high-speed rail line, which passes through this station.

== Destinations ==
- East: Kyiv, Dnipro, Odesa, Zaporizhzhia, Mariupol, Kharkiv, Kherson, Shostka, and Kryvyi Rih
- West:
  - Domestic: Lviv, Ivano-Frankivsk, Chernivtsi, Uzhhorod
  - International: Budapest, Prague, Žilina, Bratislava
- North: Kyiv, Vinnytsia, and Shepetivka
- South: Larga (near the Ukraine-Moldova border)
