= Vinnytsia railway station =

Main railway station in the Ukrainian city of Vinnytsia

Vinnytsia Вінниця
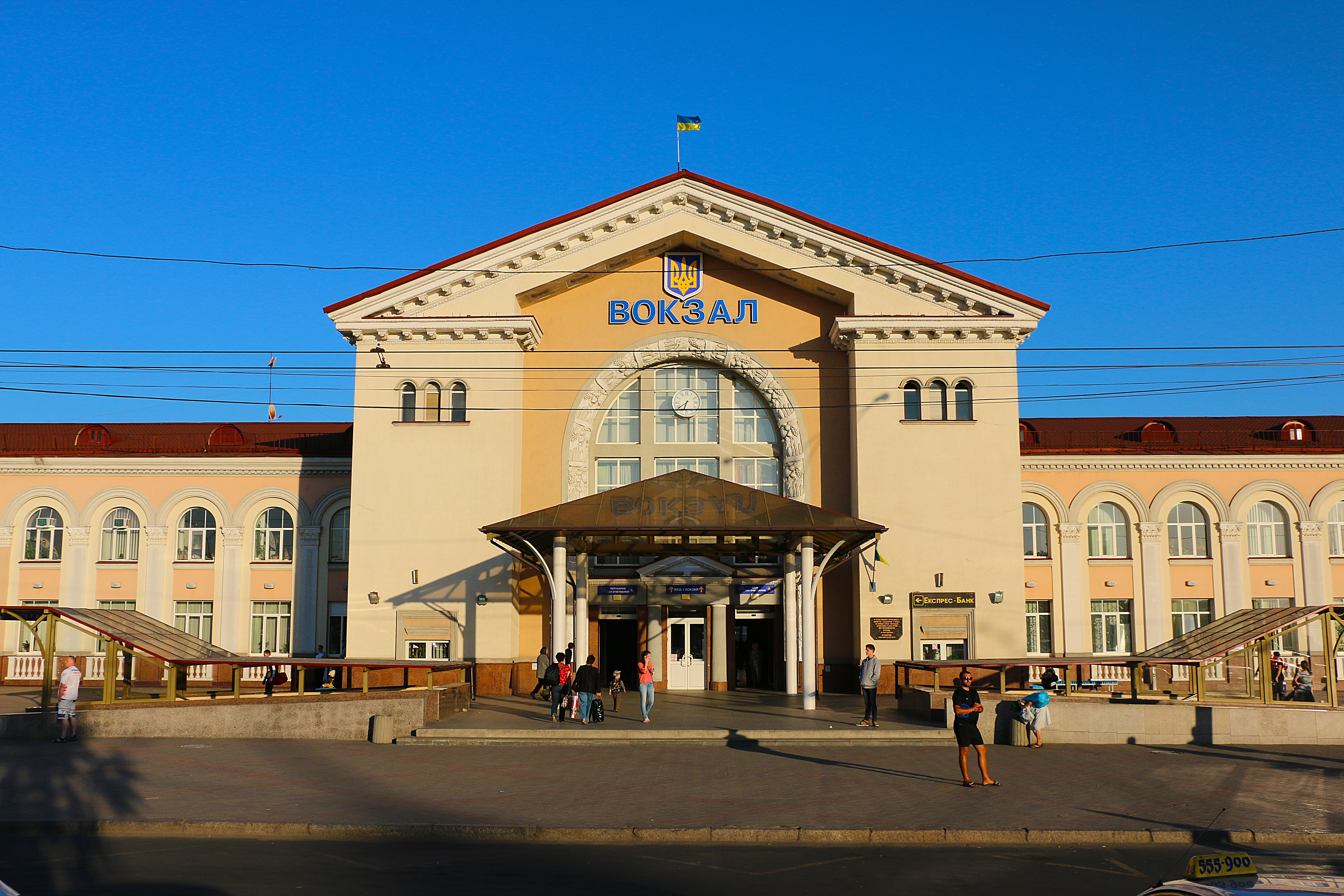
- Front view of the railway station

General information
- Location: 1 Privokzalna Square, Vinnytsia; Vinnytsia Oblast, Ukraine
- Coordinates: 46°24′35″N 28°51′03″E
- System: Railway station of Southwestern Railways
- Operator: Southwestern Railways
- Distance: 221 kilometres (137 mi) from Kyiv
- Platforms: 3

Other information
- Station code: 335801

History
- Opened: 1870

Services
Preceding station	Ukrainian Railways	Following station
Terminus	Koziatyn I–Vinnytsia	Vinnytsia-Cargo towards Koziatyn I
5 km towards Haivoron	Vinnytsia–Haivoron	Terminus
Parpurivsky towards Zhmerinka	Vinnytsia–Zhmerinka	Terminus
Long-distance trains
Khmelnytskyi toward Lviv	Invincibility	Kyiv-Pasazhyrskyi toward Kramatorsk
Podilsk toward Odesa-Holovna	Chornomorets	Kyiv-Pasazhyrskyi Terminus
Khmelnytskyi toward Truskavets	Evening Dawns	Kyiv-Pasazhyrskyi toward Kharkiv
Location

Vinnytsia railway station (Ukrainian: Станція Вінниця) is the main railway station in the Ukrainian city of Vinnytsia. It first opened in 1870, and is a part of Southwestern Railways.

According to the "Investment Atlas of Ukraine", the station receives around 1.3 million passengers every year.

== History ==
The station was built in 1870 as part of a rail line between Kyiv and Podilsk. Initially, the building of the station was made out of wood. A stone building was constructed at the end of the 19th century. In 1940, the current building was constructed. In 1952, it was rebuilt again after being destroyed during the Second World War. The station underwent major renovations in 2003 due to its aging infrastructure.

In 2018, Vinnytsia's railway station was the 6th busiest train station in Ukraine, with 5.7 million passengers.

== Destinations ==
Major long-distance destinations are: Lviv, Ivano-Frankivsk, Uzhhorod, Chernivtsi, Kyiv, Kharkiv, Dnipro, Zaporizhzhia, Mykolaiv, Kovel, and Odesa.

International destinations include: Budapest, Bratislava, Prague, Bucharest, Chișinău, Minsk, and Moscow (Note: Chișinău, Minsk, and Moscow have been cancelled since 2020).
