= Sobornyi Avenue =

Street in Zaporizhzhia, Ukraine

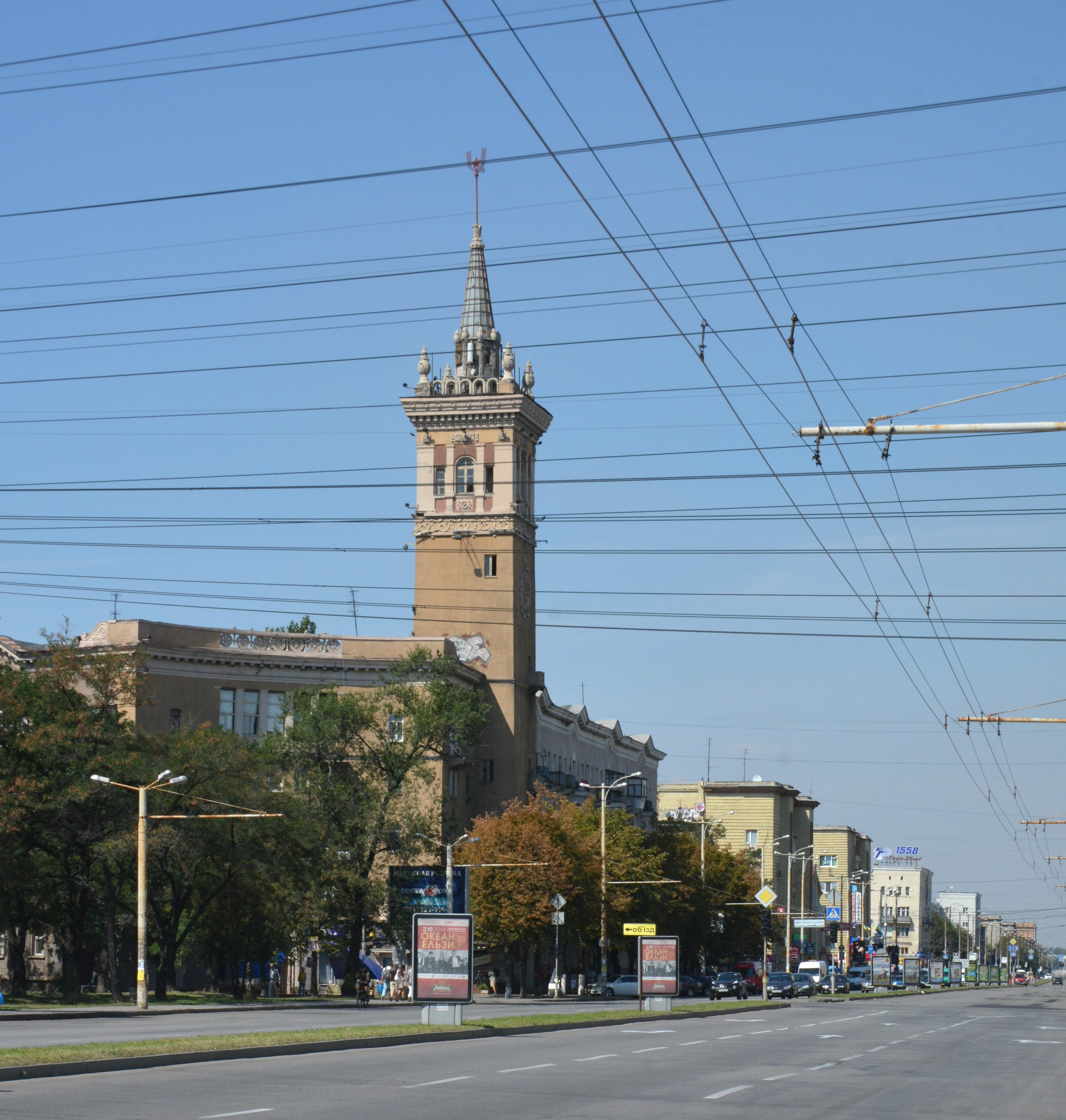
- Interactive map of Sobornyi Avenue
- Native name: Соборний проспект (Ukrainian)
- Length: 10.8 km (6.7 mi)
- Postal code: 69000, 69001, 69002, 69005, 69006, 69032, 69035, 69037, 69057, 69063, 69107, 69118, 69126
- Coordinates: 47°51′47″N 35°5′42″E

Sobornyi Avenue (Ukrainian: Соборний проспект, romanized: Sobornyi prospekt, lit. 'Cathedral Avenue') is the central thoroughfare of the city of Zaporizhzhia.

It starts from Pryvokzalna Square near the Zaporizhzhia-1 railway station and ends at Zaporizhzhia Square near the Dnieper Hydroelectric Station. It runs along four city districts of Komunarskyi, Oleksandrivskyi, Voznesenivskyi and Dniprovskyi.

Starting its way from Pryvokzalna Square, the avenue runs through the headquarters of ZAZ and exits after Transportna Square on a straight section (with a slight bend) for a length of approximately 9 km (5.6 mi). The total length of Sobornyi Avenue is 10.8 km (6.7 mi), due to which some sources claim that the avenue is the longest in Europe. However, Sobornyi Avenue is surpassed in length by Heroiv Kharkova Avenue in Kharkiv (18 km (11 mi)) and Lenin Avenue in Volgograd (14 km (8.7 mi)). The residential quarters of Sotsmisto in the area of the Dnieper Hydroelectric Station dam and Metalurhiv Avenue are considered to be one of the best examples of constructivist architecture of the first half of the 20th century. The project of this architectural ensemble in 1932 received a gold medal at an exhibition in Paris. Sobornyi Avenue claims the title of one of the "7 Wonders of Zaporizhzhia".
