= Vadul-Siret railway station =

Railway station in Ukraine

Coordinates: 48.0238°N 25.9607°E

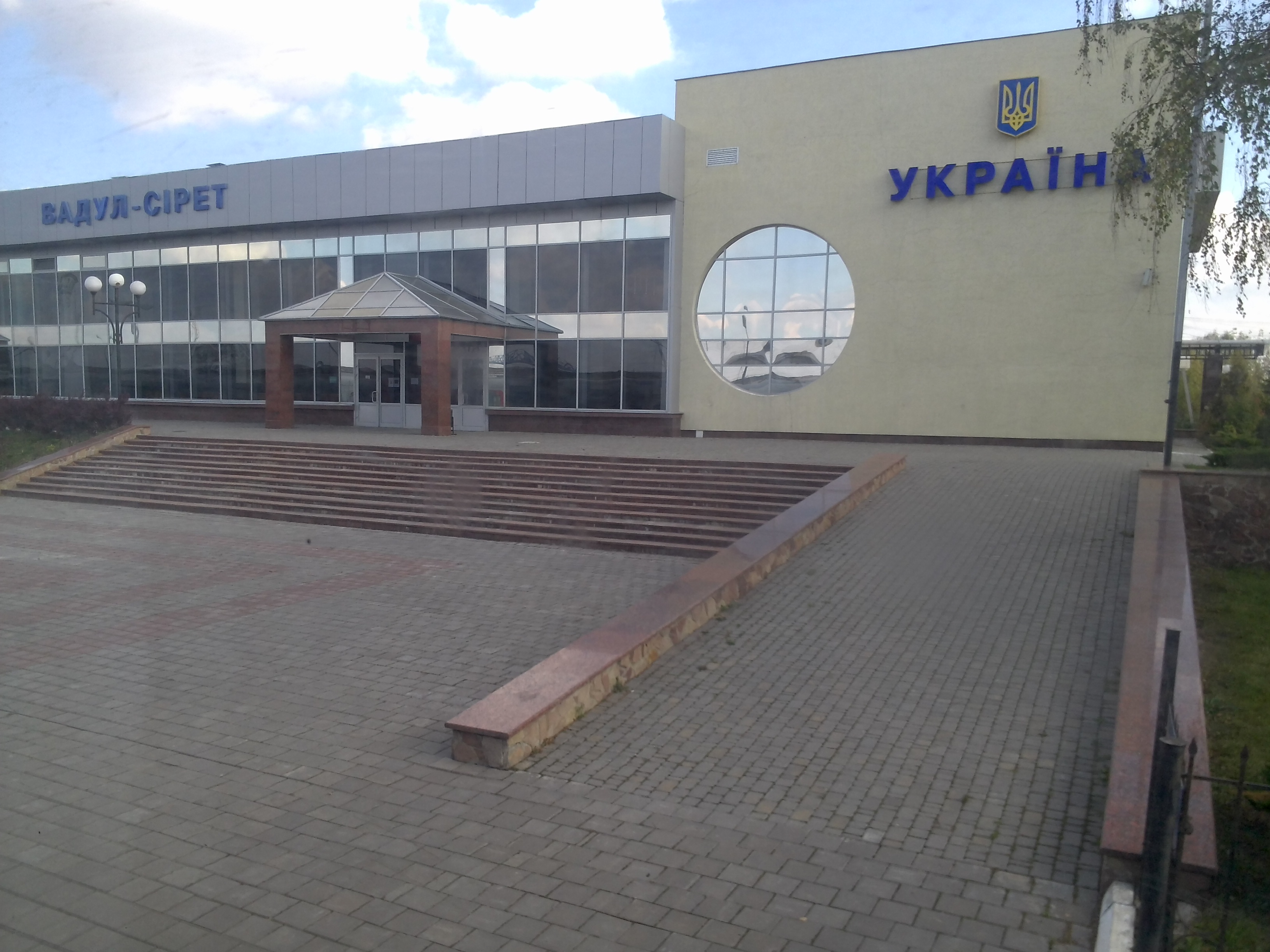
Vadul Siret Railway Station

Vadul-Siret (Ukrainian: Вадул-Сірет) is a railway station in the Chernivtsi Oblast of western Ukraine, 7 km north of the Romanian border, on the line south from Chernivtsi.

The station functions as the border control point for crossings between Ukraine and the border transit station at Vicșani railway station (Ukrainian: Вікшань) in Romania. There are immigration and customs controls with passenger platforms for change of trains and there is also gauge change equipment from Ukrainian wide gauge of 1520 mm to standard gauge in Romania.

The Bukovyna international train service between Ukraine and Bucharest also crossed the border here before its cancelation in 2021.

In November 2022 as part of a joint Romania–Ukraine programme to provide extra rail capacity following the 2022 Russian invasion of Ukraine, six standard gauge and seven broad gauge tracks were reopened for traffic.

== See also ==
- Rail transport in Ukraine
- Rail transport in Romania
- Suceava railway station
- List of railway stations in Ukraine
