= Chortkiv railway station =

Railway station in Chortkiv, Ukraine

Chortkiv railway station is a nodular cargo and passenger station in the town of Chortkiv, Ukraine. Chortkiv station is situated on the railway line Ternopil - Chernivtsi. The station serves freight and passengers.

The station was built in 1896. The station is equipped with two platforms connected by four ground crossings. The longest platform allows for 14 passenger cars. The number of tracks intended for parking cars and forming trains is 8. A single track connects Ternopil to Chernivtsi, because of the complicated terrain. Trains are propelled by diesel locomotives (2M62),(M62),(DR1А),(CHME3).

The line has 400 engineering structures, including 93 bridges, tunnels and overpasses. Maintenance and debugging of rolling stocks is serviced by the locomotive station Chortkiv (TU-6). The railway station Chortkiv has suburban and distant connection.

== Trains ==
The station receives two pairs of suburban passenger trains daily. Husyatyn-Buchach-Husyatyn, Chortkiv-Husyatyn and Ternopil - Chortkiv-Ternopil trains were abolished in 2015. A few kilometers north, two pairs of local trains connect Ternopil and Ivano-Puste using Vyhnanka station.

Historically, the Ternopil - Chernivtsi line passes through Chortkiv and Ternopil. All passenger trains that run from Ternopil to Chernivtsi were directed to bypass the line, instead passing through Lviv and Ivano-Frankivsk. In USSR, only one passenger train traveled from Ivano-Frankivsk to Kozyatin. Since 1991 the train shifted to Shepetivka station.

In the 2000s a stop at Chortkiv was introduced for passenger trains such as Ivano-Frankivsk-Kharkiv (with a trailing wagon Ivano-Frankivsk Donetsk), Ivano-Frankivsk-Odesa, Chernivtsi-Odesa, Chernivtsi-Kyiv, Moscow -Sofiya, Ivano-Frankivsk-Shepetivka. On the train from Moscow to Sofia cars traveled from Moscow-Bucharest, Moscow-Chernovtsy, Saloniki- Moscow and Minsk-Sofia.

Since 2012 Ukrzaliznytsia changed the routes for Odesa-Moscow-Chernivtsi and Lviv-Sofia;The trains from Ivano-Frankivsk to Shepetivka and Ivano-Frankivsk - Kharkiv were canceled. In 2014 the route of train №117 was changed.

Only one long distance night passenger train goes through Chortkiv. It is train №357 / 358 "Huzulschyna" Kyiv-Ternopil-Rakhiv, but "UZ International" monitors the passenger traffic. Chortkiv station plays an important role for the residents and transportation of freights and passengers.
