= Protasiv Yar railway station =

Railway station in Ukraine

Protasiv Yar Протасів Яр
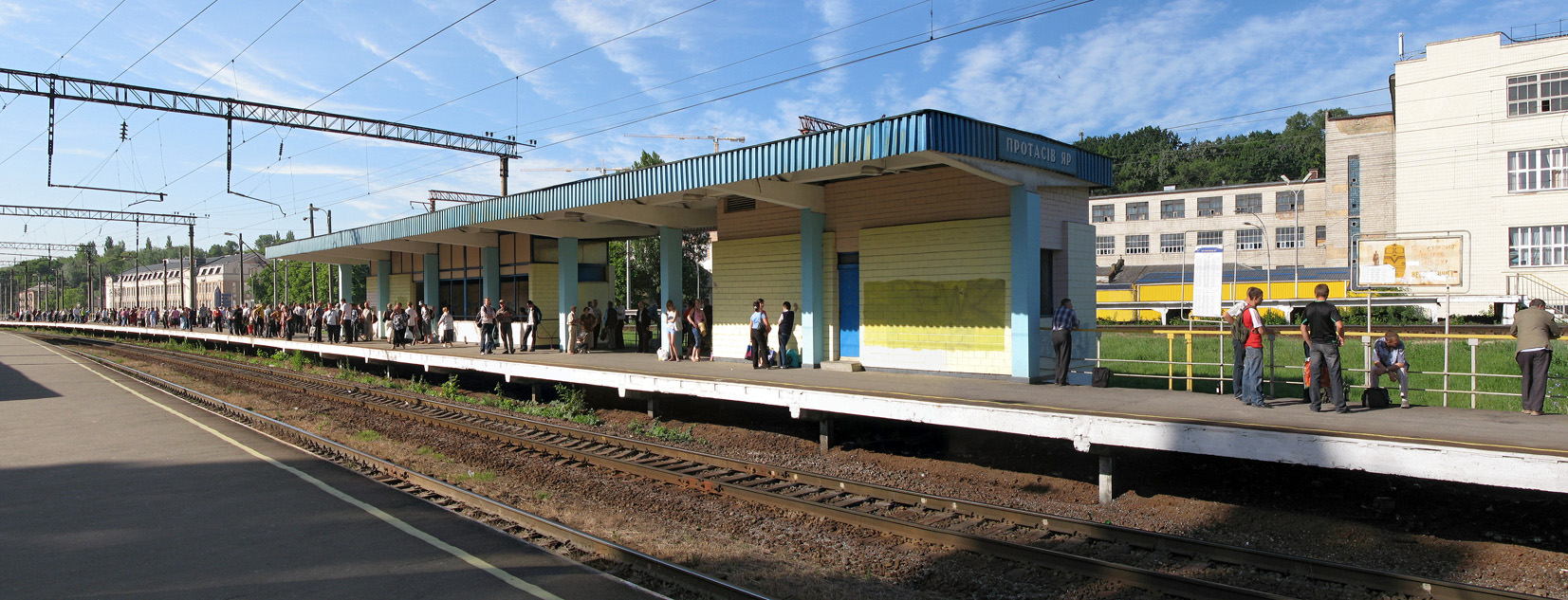

General information
- Location: Mykoly Hrinchenka Boulevard, Kyiv, Ukraine
- Coordinates: 50°25′33″N 30°30′26″E
- System: Southwestern Railway station
- Owner: Ukrzaliznytsia
- Platforms: 2
- Tracks: 2

Construction
- Structure type: At-grade

Other information
- Station code: 320219

History
- Opened: 1954

Services
Preceding station	Ukrainian Railways	Following station
Kyiv-Pasazhyrskyi	Southwestern Railways	Kyiv-Demiivskyi
Kyiv-Pasazhyrskyi toward Darnytsia	Kyiv City Express	Kyiv-Demiivskyi toward Darnytsia
Location

Protasiv Yar (Ukrainian: Протасів Яр) is a railway stop that is located in Kyiv, Ukraine. It is part of the Kyiv Directorate of Southwestern Railways.

The stop was created in 1954 during the electrification of a segment Kyiv-Pasazhyrskyi - Brovary.

Among the services provided at the station is only embarkment and disembarkment of passengers for commuter and regional lines. There is no loading and unloading of luggage.
