= Larga railway station =

Railway station of the Lviv Railways

Larga Ларга
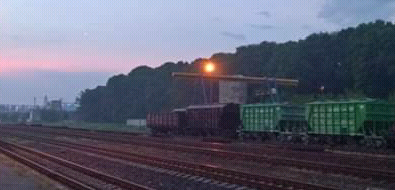

History
- Opened: 1894
Location

Larga (Cyrillic: Ларга) is a railway station of the Lviv Railways.

It is administered by the Ivano-Frankivsk administration. The station is located on the border with Moldova and has three directions towards Chernivtsi, Sokiryany and Khmelnytskyi Oblast as part of the Southwestern Railways.
