= Uzhhorod railway station =

Railway station in Uzhhorod, Ukraine

Uzhhorod Ужгород
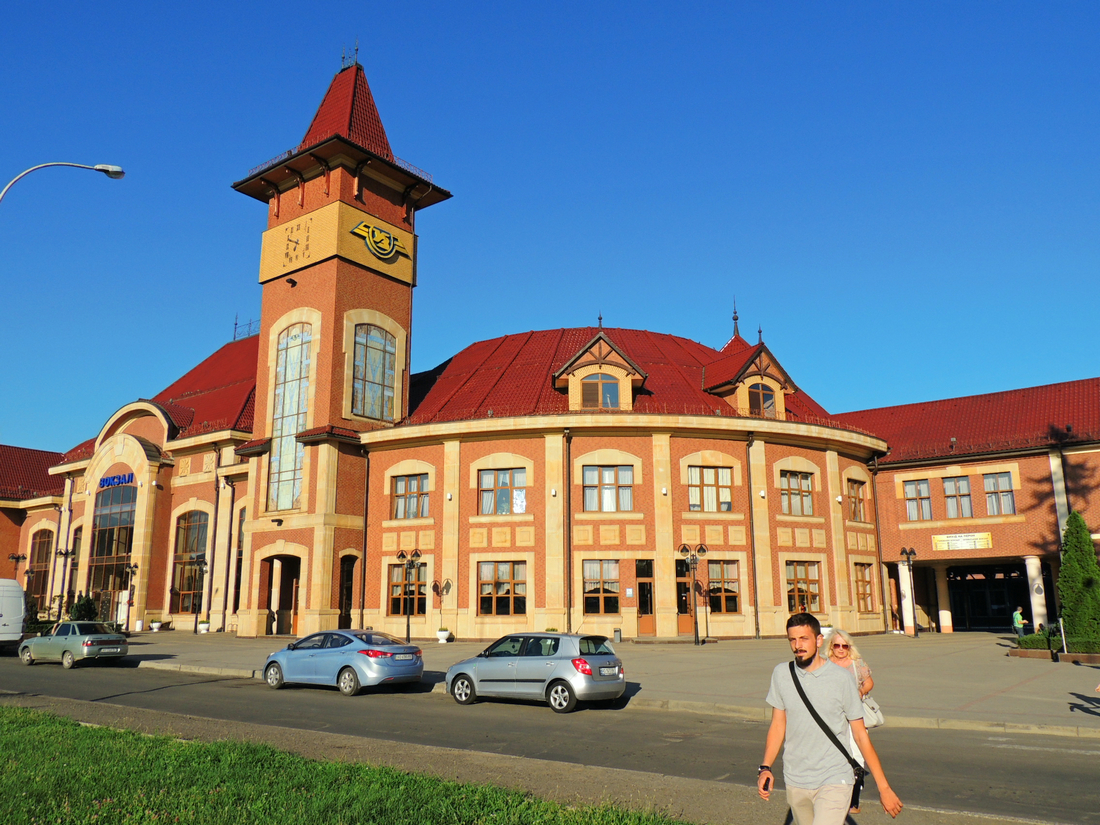

General information
- Location: Ukraine, Uzhgorod, Stantsiina str. 9
- Coordinates: 48°36′34.31″N 22°18′1.65″E
- System: Lviv Railways terminal
- Owner: Ukrainian Railways
- Platforms: 8
- Bus routes: 5, 9, 10, 58, 21

Construction
- Parking: yes

History
- Opened: 1872
- Rebuilt: 2004

Services
Preceding station	Lviv Railways	Following station
Location

Uzhhorod railway station (Ukrainian: Залізнична станція Ужгород) is the main railway station in Uzhhorod, Ukraine. It also is used as a port on the Slovakia–Ukraine border for freight transport. The rail border checkpoint is part of the Chop customs.

The station was opened to the public in October 2004. It is located on Heorhiy Kirpa Square, 300 meters away from the city's main bus station.

== History ==
The station was opened on 28 August 1872, as a part of Hungarian North Eastern Railway. The former building of the Ungvar (Uzhhorod) Railway Station was built in the early 20th century and renovated in 2004, becoming the suburban railway station.

In 1968, the station was electrified. In the late 1970s, the Soviet Government decided to build a new station building for the 1980 Olympic Games, but the project was never completed.

In 2002, the Ukrainian Cabinet of Ministers decided to build a new modern bigger railway station complex. The works began in 2003. In October 2004 Ukrainian Prime Minister Viktor Yanukovych and Uzhhorod city mayor Viktor Pohorelov opened the new station complex to the public.

== The complex today ==
The suburban station serves trains to stations in the Zakarapattia Oblast. The central railway station serves departures and arrivals to and from:

- Kyiv
- Lviv
- Odesa
- Kharkiv
- Zaporizhzhia

Previous station	Operator	Next Station
260 km	Lviv Railways	Domanyntsi

== Gallery ==
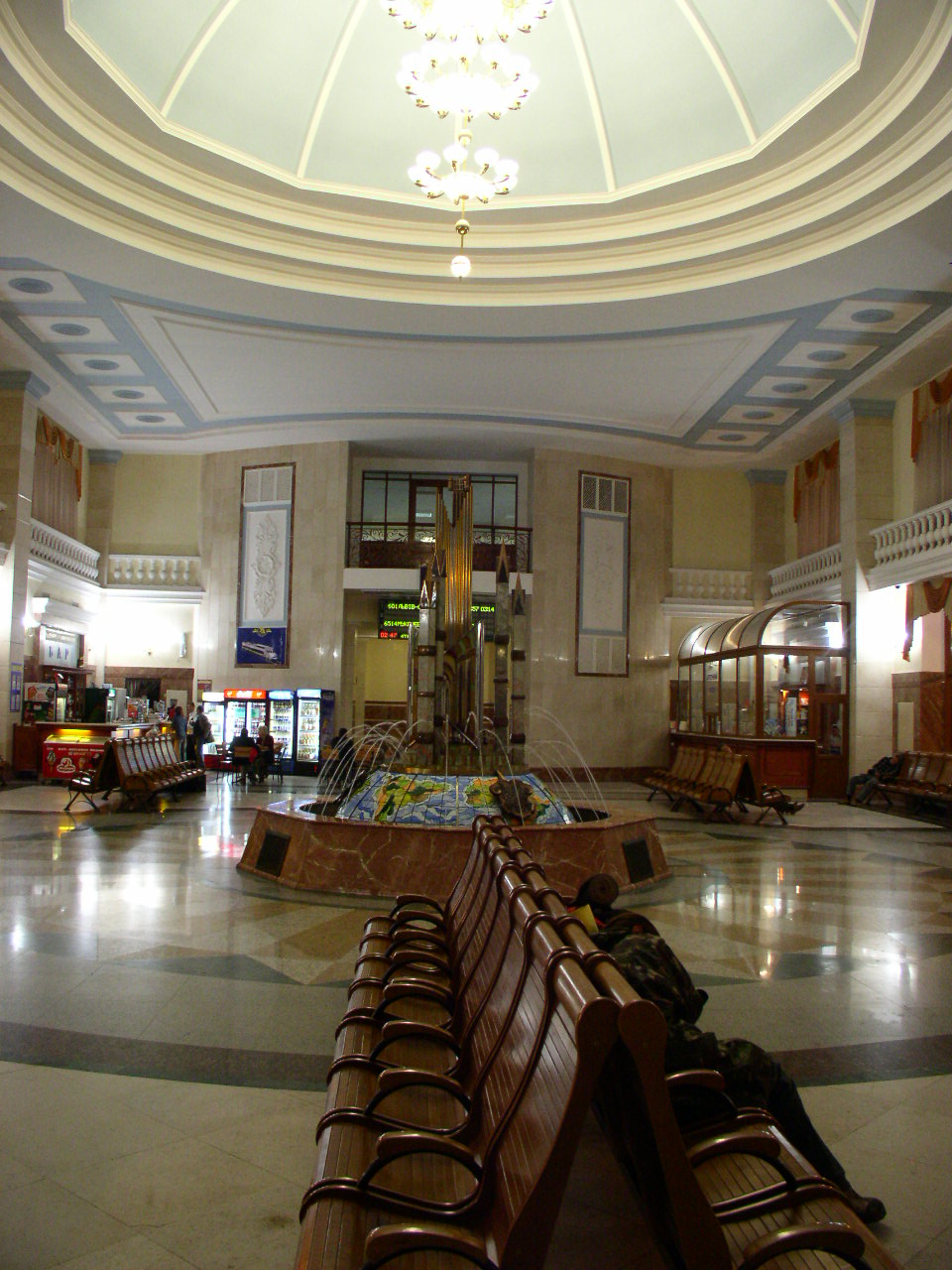
The Grand Hall with the fountain.

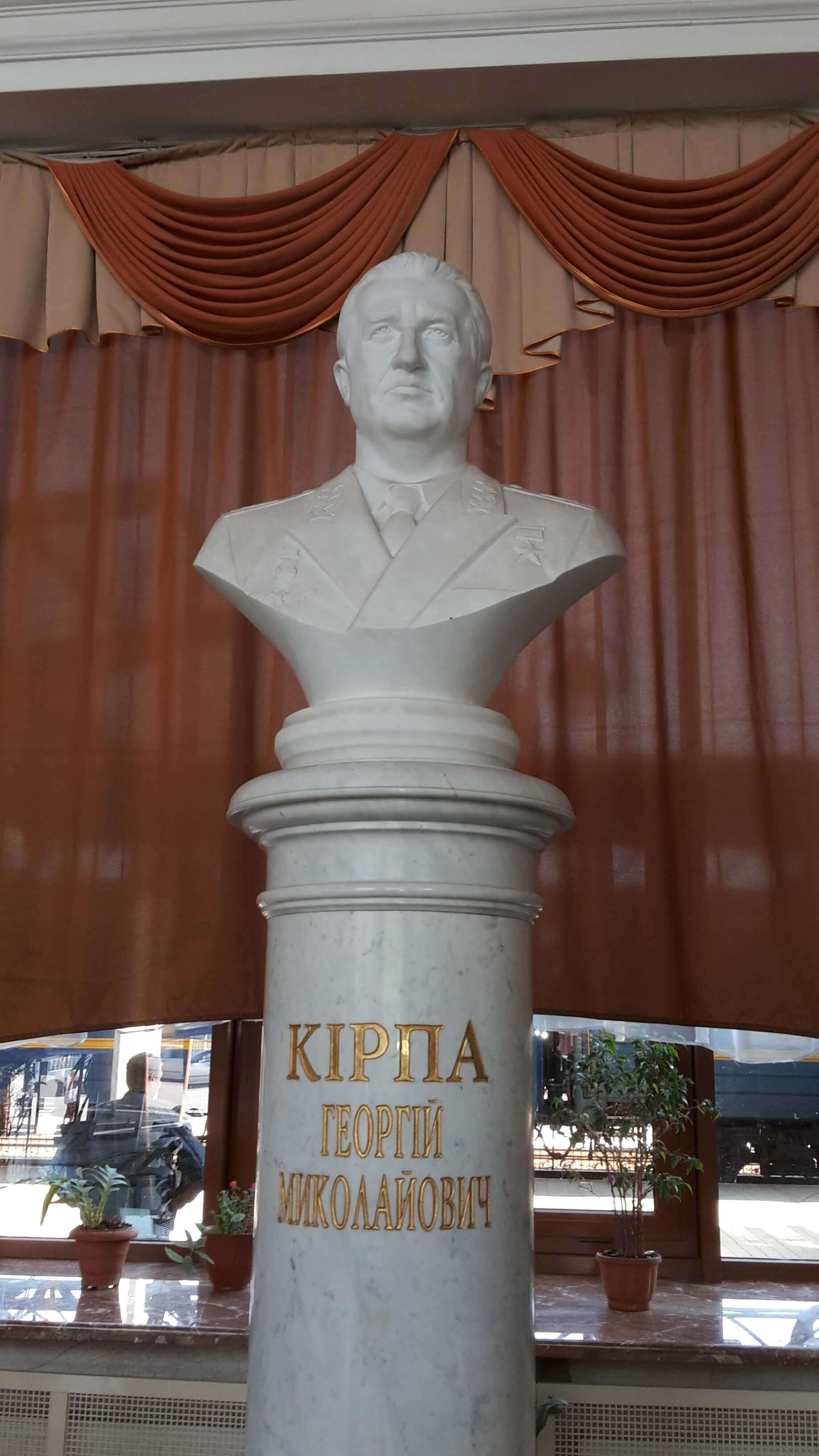
Heorhiy Kirpa statue inside the Grand Hall.

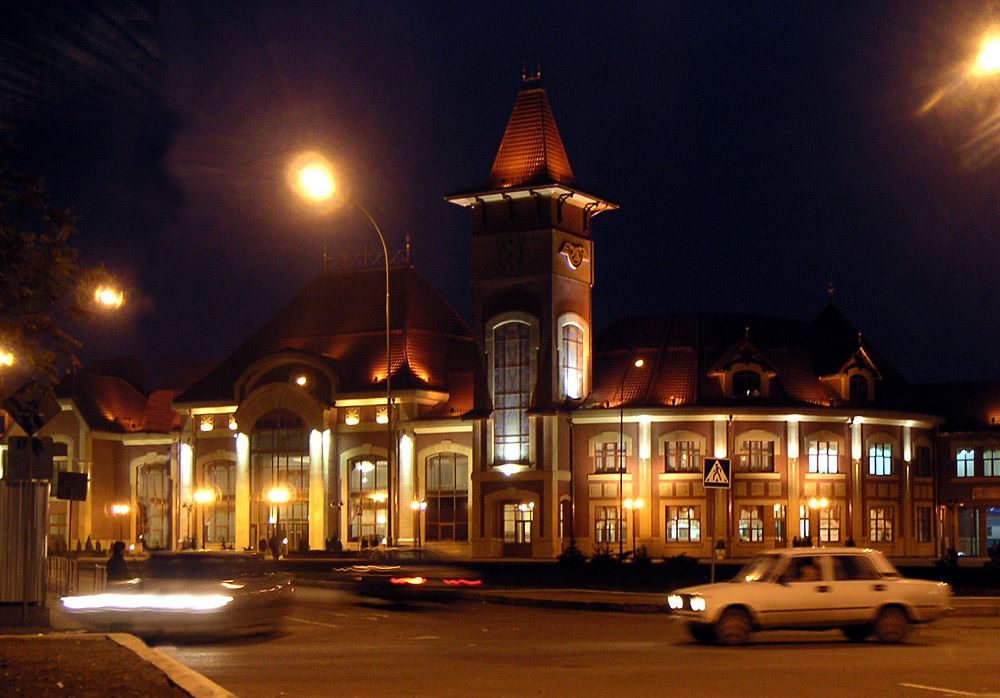
The illumination of the Uzhhorod Central Station.

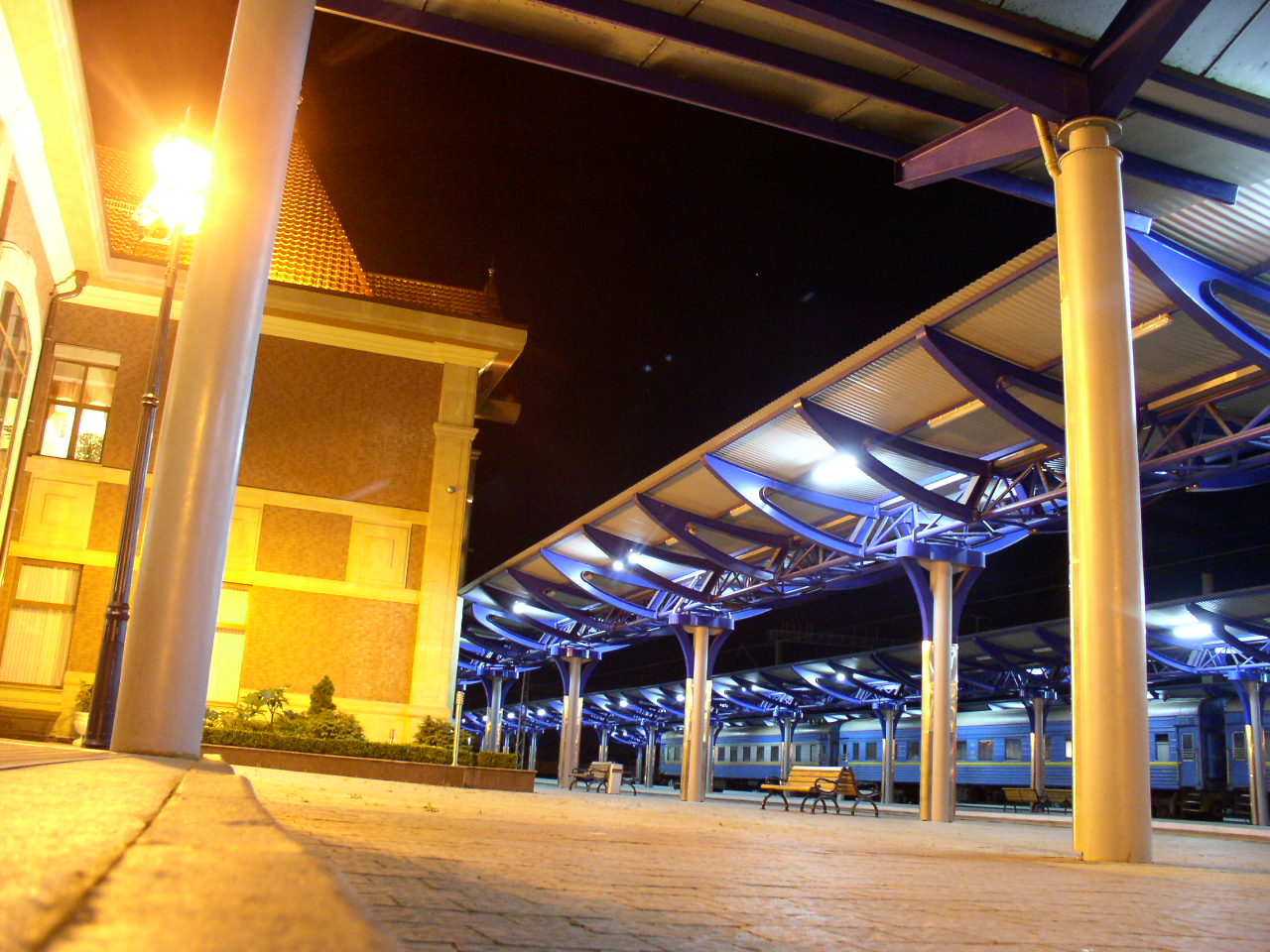
Kyiv-Uzhhorod train at Uzhhorod Railway Station.

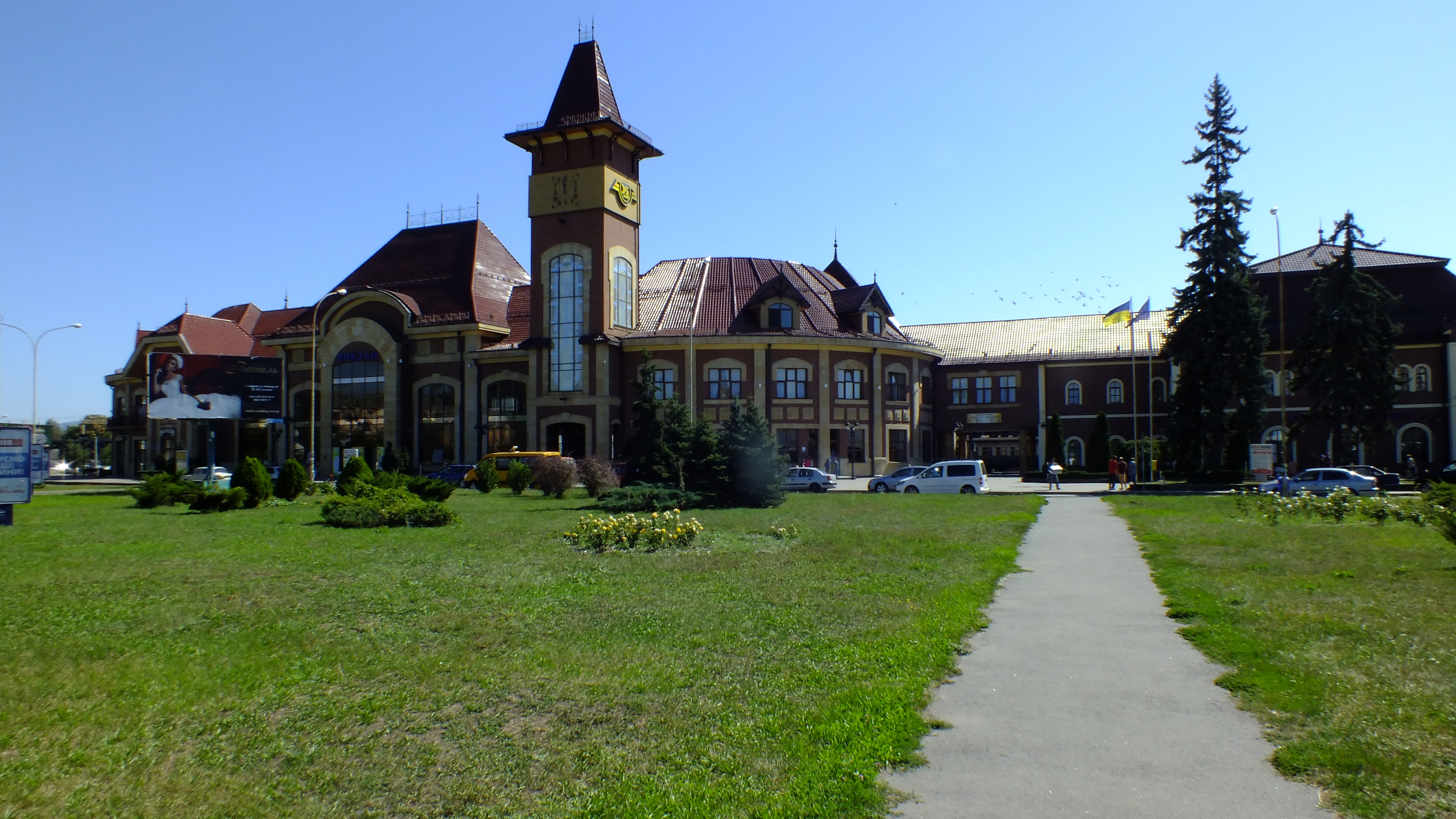

== See also ==
- Chop railway station, still on the Ukrainian side of the border
- Čierna nad Tisou railway station, on the Slovakian side
- Uzhhorod – Košice broad gauge track
- Slovakia–Ukraine border
- Uzhhorod (border checkpoint)
