= Shepetivka railway station =

Ukrainian railway station

Shepetivka Шепетівка
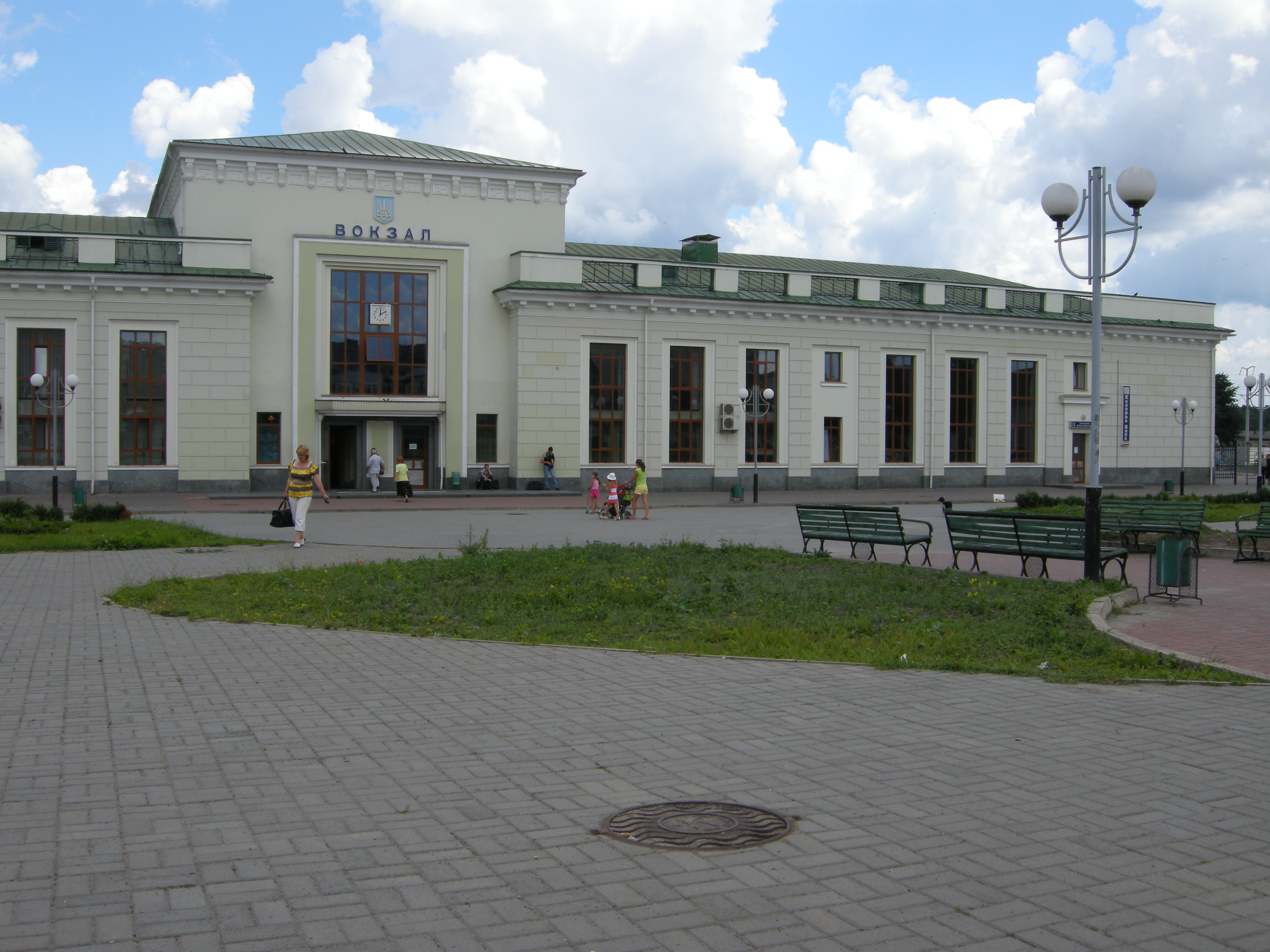
- Terminal of Shepetivka station

General information
- Location: Ukraine, Shepetivka
- Coordinates: 50°11′57″N 27°03′39″E
- System: Southwestern Railway terminal
- Owner: Ukrainian Railways
- Operator: Southwestern Railways
- Platforms: 1 (main platform), 2 (island platform)
- Tracks: 45

Construction
- Structure type: At-grade
- Parking: yes

Other information
- Station code: 340000

History
- Opened: 1873
Location

Shepetivka (Ukrainian: Шепетівка) is a railway hub of the Koziatyn directory of Southwestern Railways.

== Gallery ==
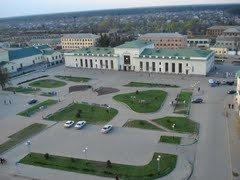
Areal view

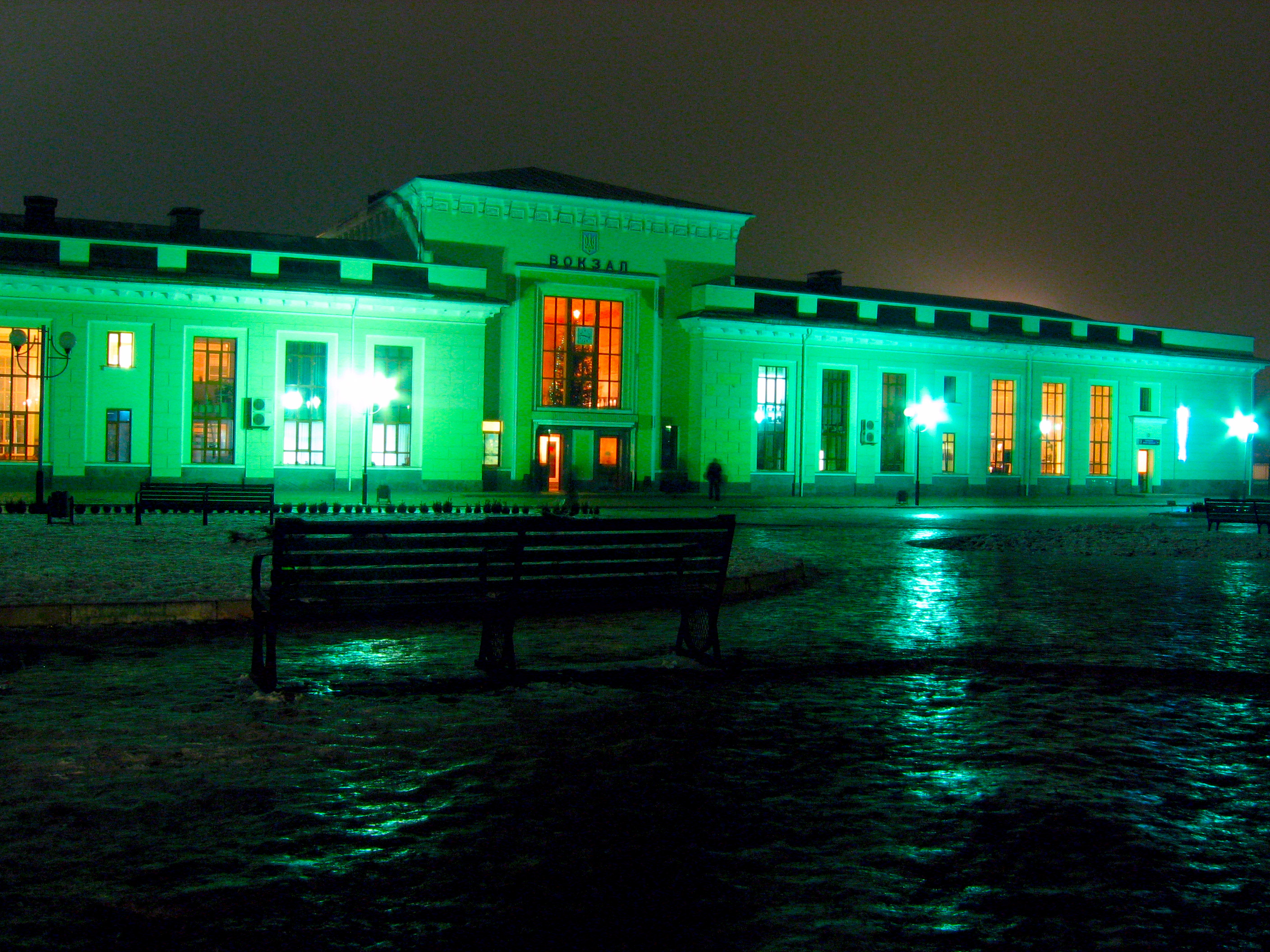
At night

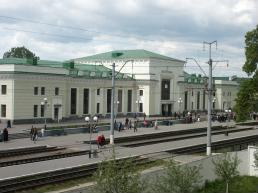
