= Kharkiv railway station =

Railway station in Kharkiv, Ukraine

Kharkiv-Pasazhyrskyi Харків-Пасажирський
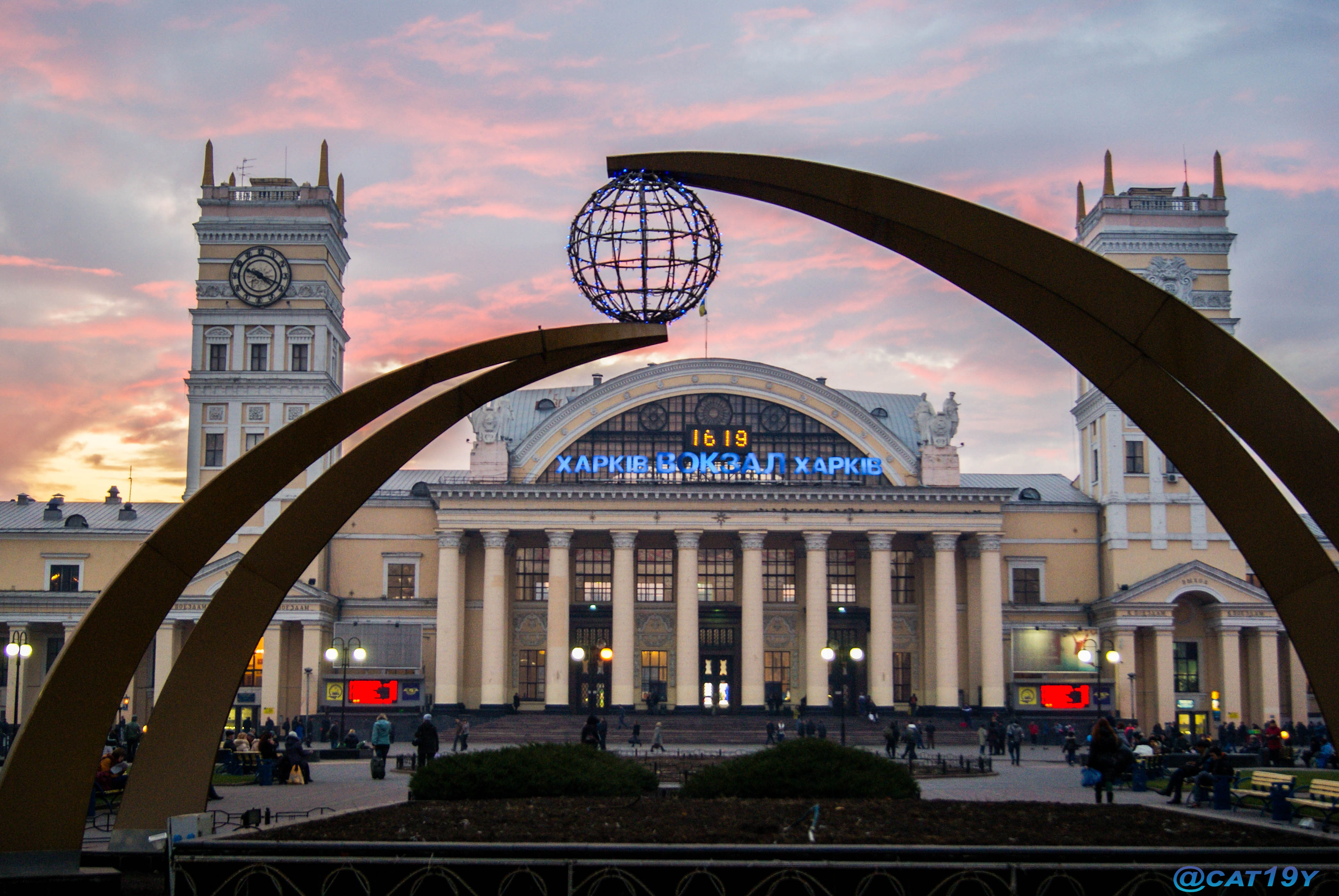

General information
- Location: Pryvokzalnyy maydan, Kharkiv; Ukraine
- Coordinates: 49°59′23″N 36°12′13″E
- System: Southern Railway terminal
- Owner: Ukrainian Railways
- Platforms: 7
- Tracks: 21
- Connections: Kharkiv Metro station: Vokzalna; Tram: 1, 3, 6, 7, 12, 20; Bus, Trolleybus

Construction
- Structure type: Standard (at-grade)
- Parking: Available

Other information
- Station code: KHP
- Fare zone: Southern Ukrainian Railways

History
- Opened: 1869
- Rebuilt: 1989

Passengers
- Daily: 260,000 (estimated yearly) ▲3%

Immovable Monument of Local Significance of Ukraine
- Official name: «Південний вокзал» (Southern railway station building)
- Type: Urban Planning, Architecture
- Reference no.: 7316-Ха
Location

Kharkiv railway station (Ukrainian: Харків-Пасажирський, romanized: Kharkiv-Pasazhyrskyi) is a railway station in Kharkiv, the second largest city in Ukraine.

== History ==
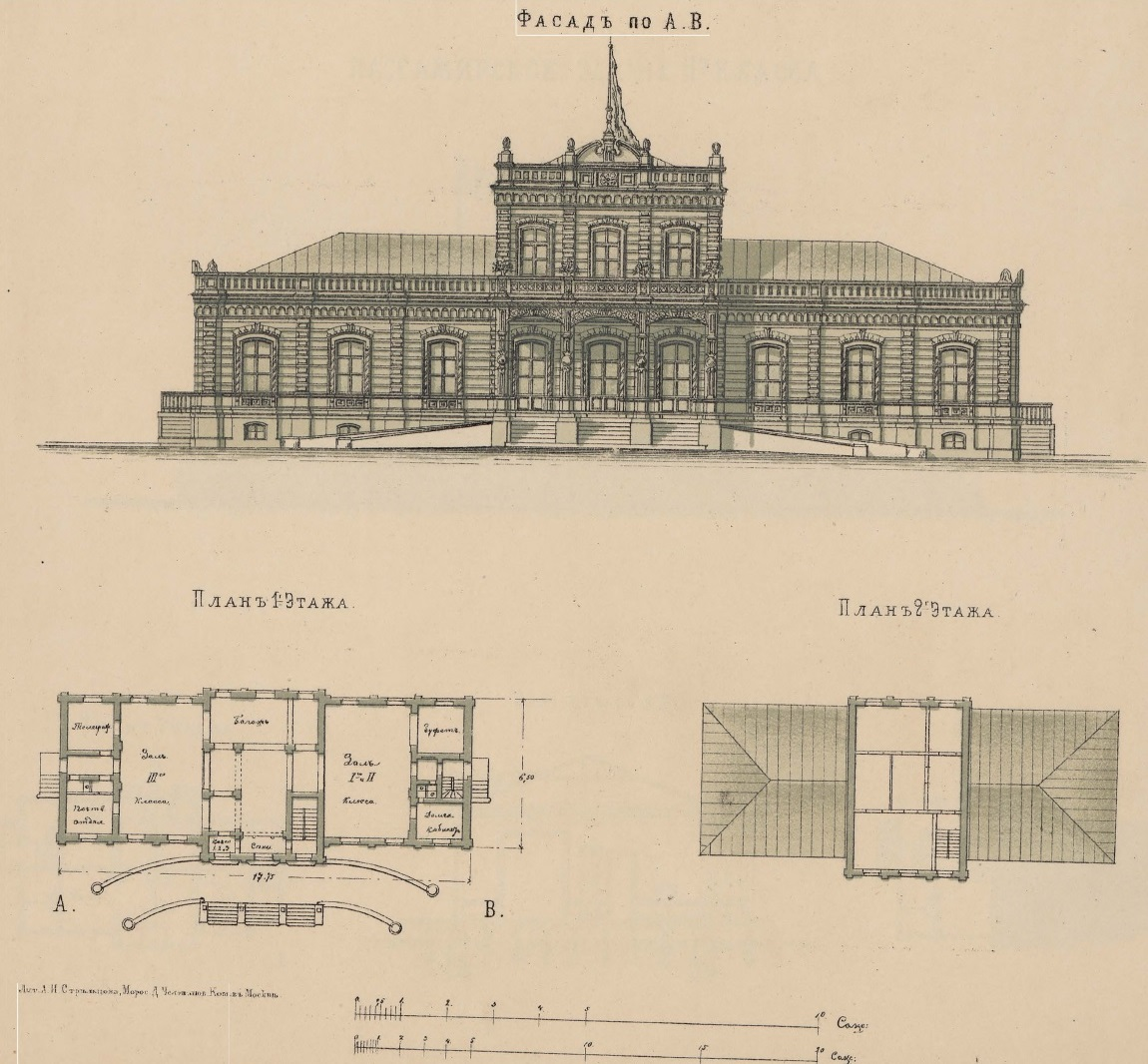
Drawing of the first station, 1872

The first station in Kharkiv was built in 1869 by famous Russian architect Andrey Ton. However, with the development of railways (especially after the opening of the road to Balashov in 1895) in 1896–1901, the station was expanded and modernized by architect I. Zagoskin, (and completed by architect J. Caune), became one of the largest in the Russian Empire.

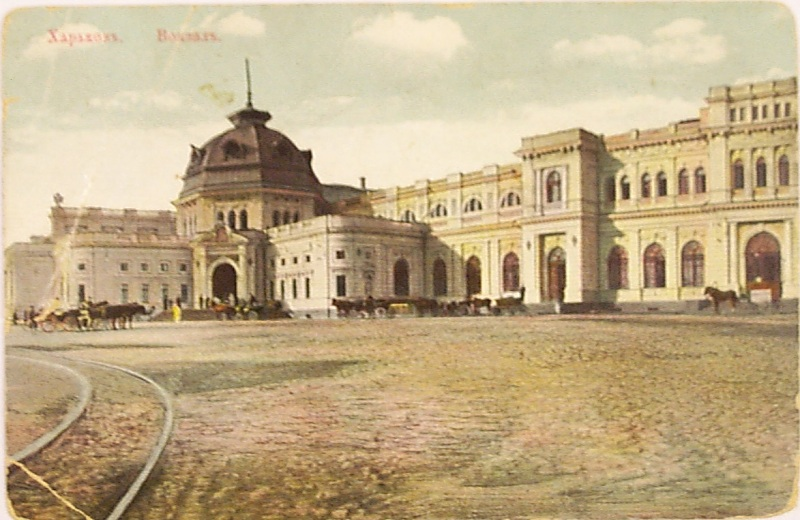
Second station, 1917

The current (third) station is built in the "Stalin Empire style" with elements of classicism. It was opened on 2 November 1952 to replace the previous station, which was destroyed during World War II. Architects – G. I. Voloshin, B. S. Mezentsev, E. A. Lymar; engineer S. Owls. Building trust "Ugtransstroy" under the direction of M. L. Bondarenko. The volume of the station is 80,000 m3, height of the hall is 26 m, the height of the towers is 42 m, the diameter of the clock in the South tower is 4.25 m. In 1950, canopies were constructed over the platforms. Between 1978 and 1982, the building was expanded to the South (to the left of Station Square) in a contemporary style by the project of the Institute Khargiprotrans (architects Y. Murygin, L. V. Gurova, L. P. Yushkin, S. A. kukhtin, and A. N. Zhirnov). A 54-room, 16-storey hotel, "the Express" was built at the station. The station was "cosmetically" restored in 2003 for the 350th anniversary of Kharkiv. The total area of station is 32,600 m^{2}, platforms and tunnels – 33,100 m^{2}.

During the 2022 Russian invasion of Ukraine, Russian forces destroyed parts of the station.

== Trains ==
Train number	Train name	Destination	Operated by
019/020	Mykola Konaryov (rus: Николай Конарёв, ukr: Микола Конарьов)	(Russia) Moscow (Kursky)	(Ukraine) Ukrainian Railways
059/060	Chayka (ukr: Чайка)	(Ukraine) Odesa (Holovna)	(Ukraine) Ukrainian Railways
063/064	Oberih (ukr: Оберіг)	(Ukraine) Kyiv (Pasazhyrskyi)	(Ukraine) Ukrainian Railways
081/082	Kharkiv (ukr: Харків)	(Ukraine) Novooleksiivka	(Ukraine) Ukrainian Railways
091/092		(Ukraine) Kremenchuk	(Ukraine) Ukrainian Railways
111/112	Slobozhanshchyna (ukr: Слобожанщина)	(Ukraine) Lviv (Holovnyi)	(Ukraine) Ukrainian Railways
115/116		(Ukraine) Ivano-Frankivsk	(Ukraine) Ukrainian Railways
143		(Russia) Saint Petersburg	(Ukraine) Ukrainian Railways

There are also numerous ordinary long distance trains to these directions.

== Gallery ==
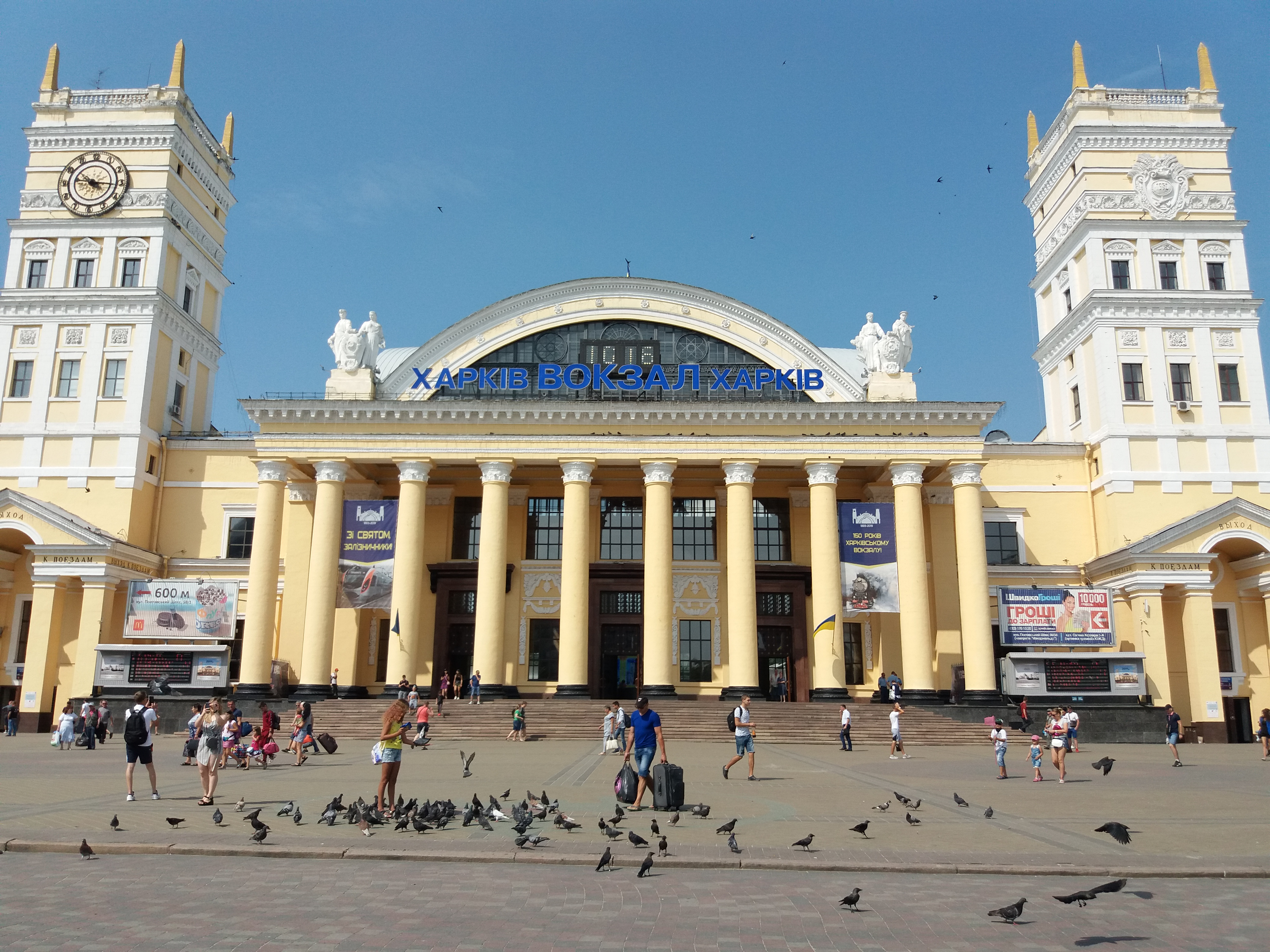
Main façade

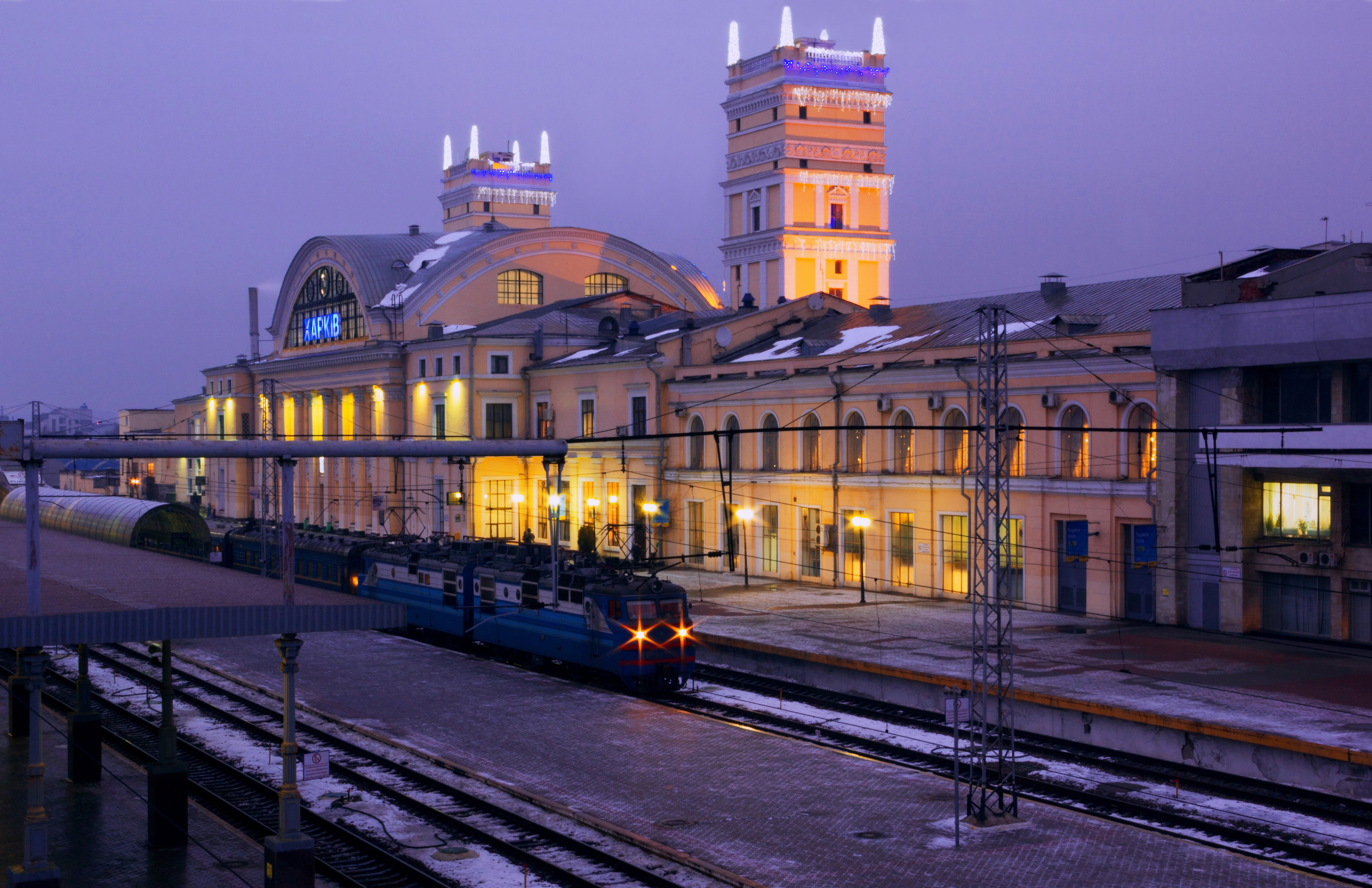
View from the bridge on Poltava Way

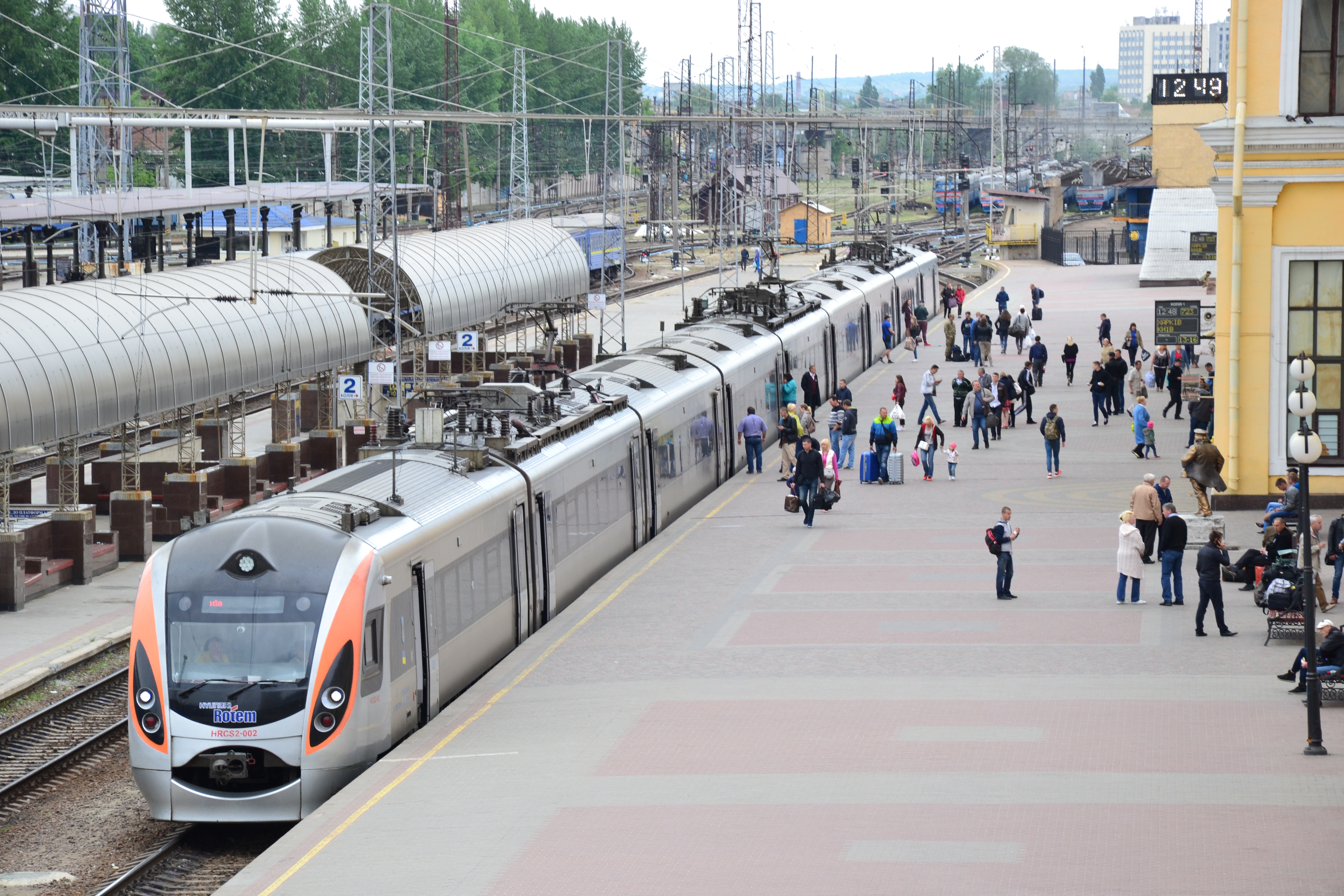
HRCS2-002 at the platform

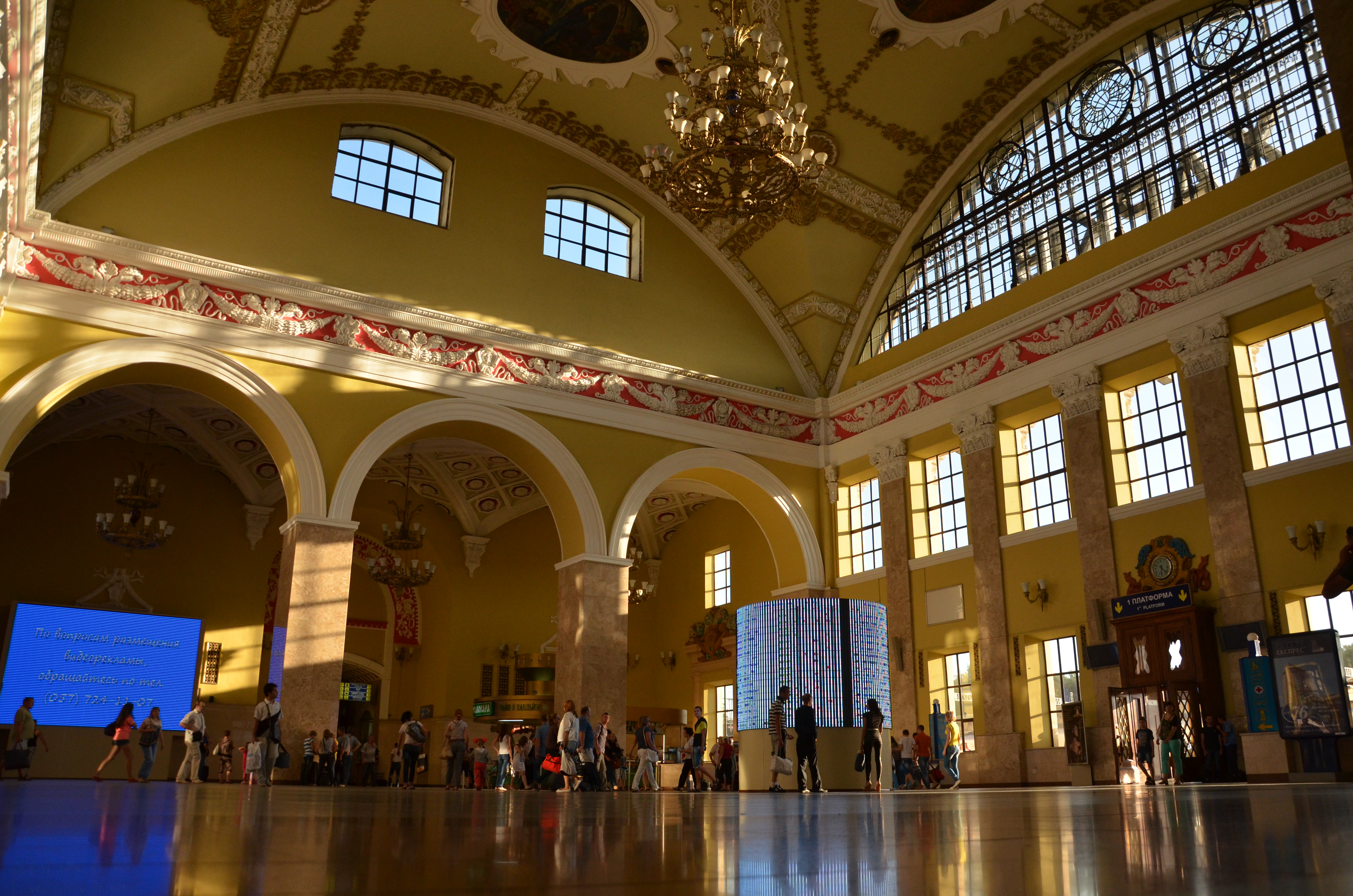
Central Hall

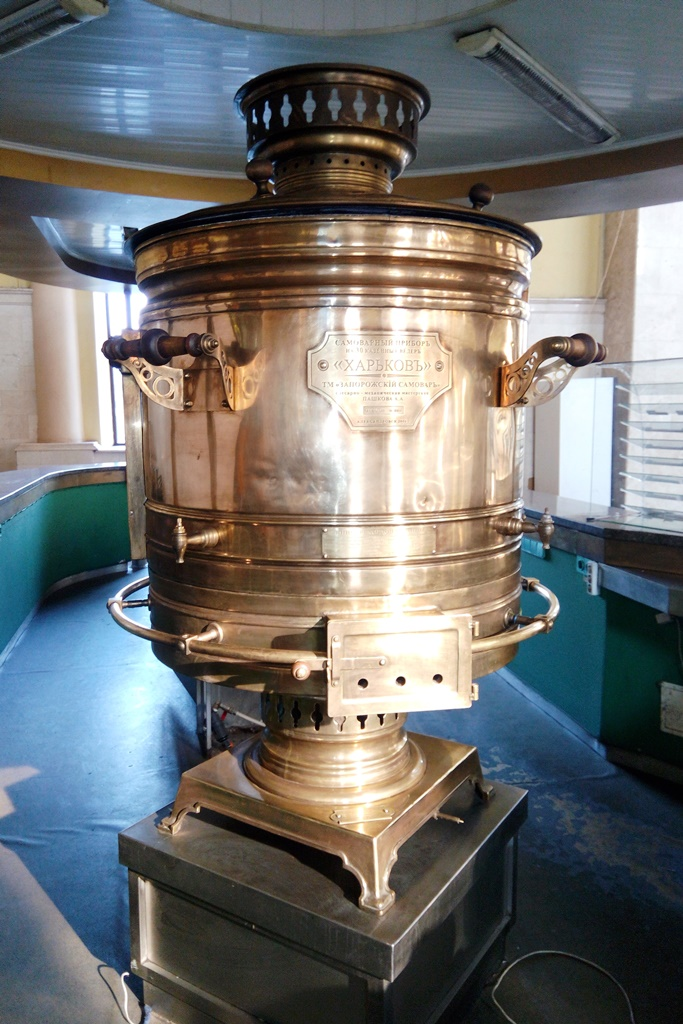
Samovar device "Kharkov" in the central hall of the station

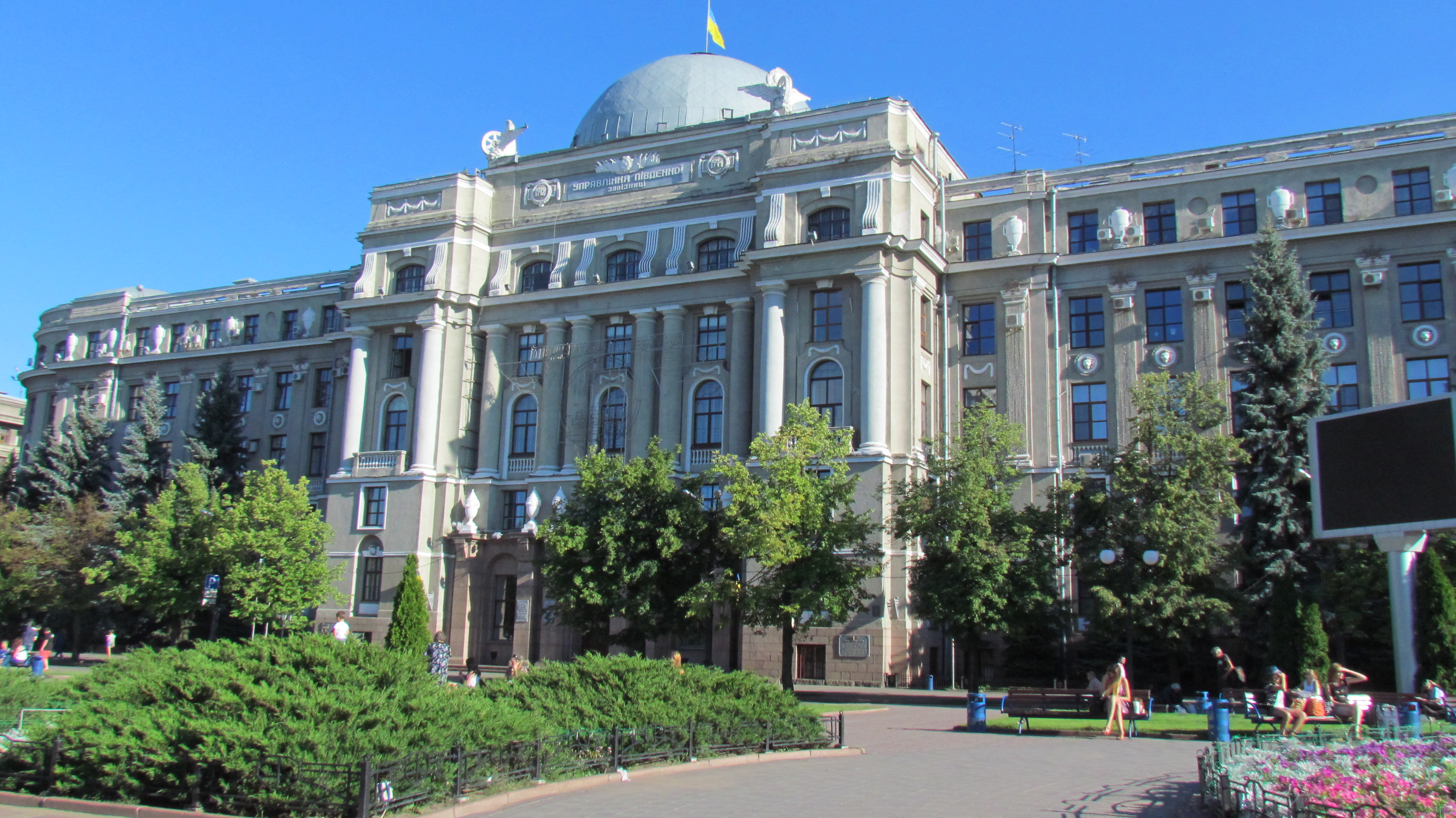
Southern Railway Authority

== See also ==
- Ukrainian Railways
- Southern Railways (Ukraine)
