= Zaporizhzhia-1 railway station =

Railway station in Zaporizhzhia, Ukraine

Zaporizhzhia-1 Запоріжжя I
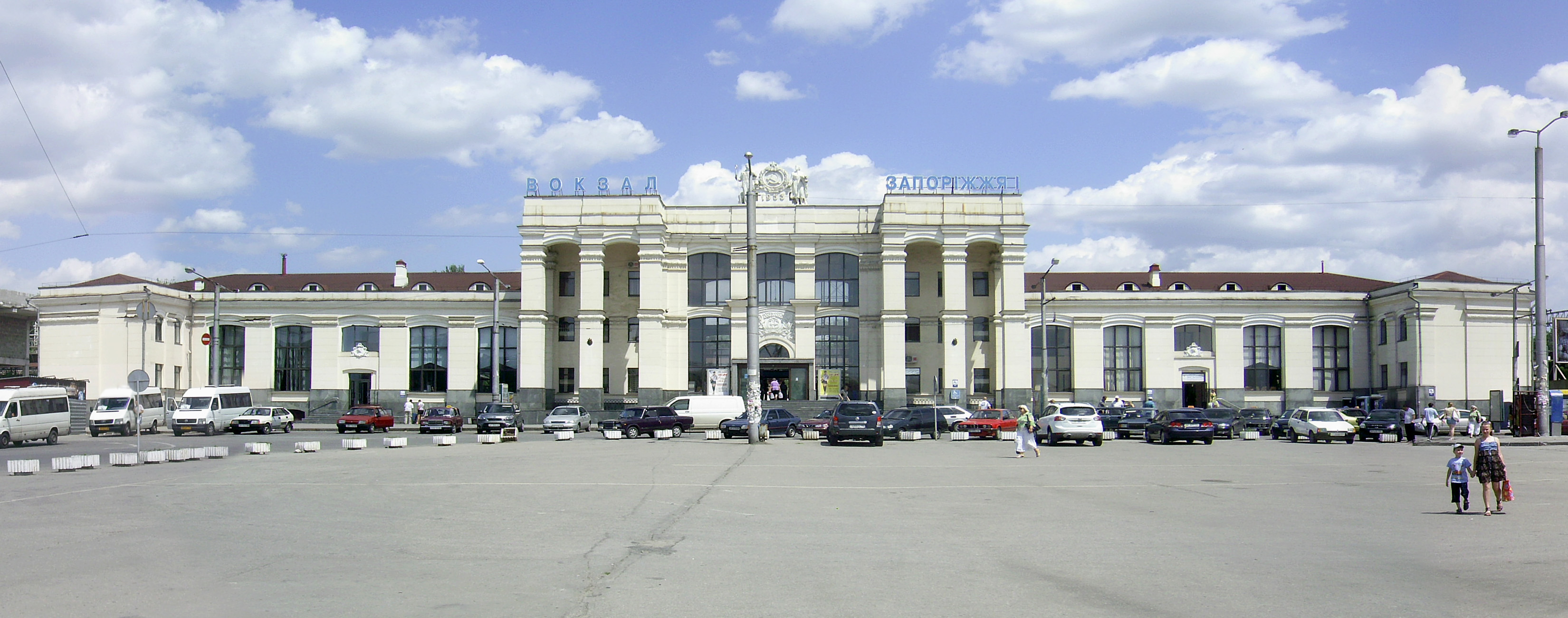

General information
- Location: 6 Sobornyi Ave., Komunarskyi District; Zaporizhzhia, Ukraine
- Coordinates: 47°47′42″N 35°11′15″E
- System: Cisdnieper Railways terminal
- Owner: Ukrzaliznytsia
- Platforms: 4
- Tracks: 6
- Connections: 3, 16; 3; 17, 18, 29, 98, 118, 119, 384

Construction
- Structure type: At-grade
- Architect: Viktor Skarzhynskyi
- Architectural style: Stalinist

Other information
- Station code: 460700

History
- Opened: 15 November 1873
- Rebuilt: 1954
- Electrified: December 1965
- Former names: Oleksandrivsk-1

Services
Preceding station	Ukrainian Railways	Following station
Motor toward Synelnykove	Synelnykove–Zaporizhzhia	Terminus
Terminus	Zaporizhzhia–Fedorivka	Balabine toward Fedorivka
Location

Zaporizhzhia-1 railway station (Ukrainian: Запоріжжя I) is the main train station in Zaporizhzhia, Ukraine. The station is located on an electrified Synelnykove — Zaporizhzhia — Fedorivka line and is one of the four railway stations in the city.

The station opened during the construction of Lozova — Sevastopol railway on 5 November 1873. The new building was constructed in 1954, after the original was destroyed in World War II. The building of the station is a monument of architecture of regional significance.

In 2018, the Zaporizhzhia-1 railway station was included in the top-10 busiest railway stations in Ukraine, serving 2.1 million long-distance passengers.

== History ==
The station and a one-story, wooden station building were opened in 1873 during the construction of the first section of the private Lozovo-Sevastopol railway in 1870-1873. Since 1874, regular train traffic began to the Melitopol station, and on 18 January 1875 to the Sevastopol station.

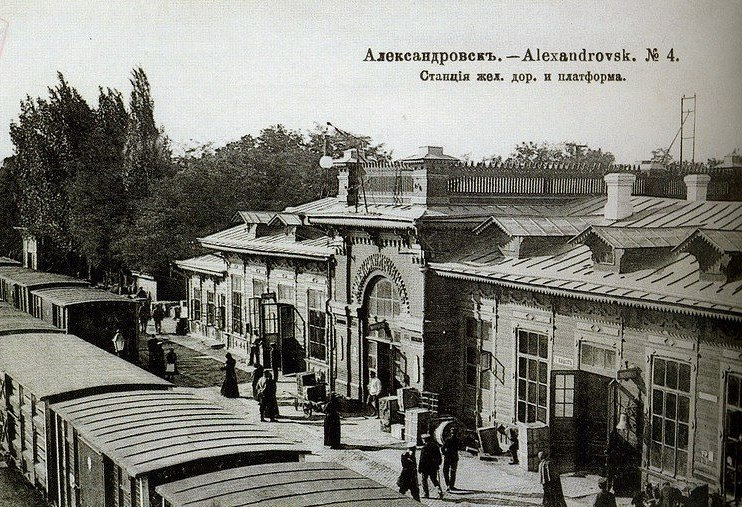
The station in 1910s

During the Russian Revolution of 1905, the station became the epicenter and last stronghold of the armed uprising of the workers of Zaporizhzhia, at the time named Oleksandrivsk.

On 23 December 1905, the workers of the Yekaterinsky and Southern Railway Workshops in Oleksandrivsk joined the All-Russian political strike. In two days, both the workshops themselves and the stations where they were located were under the control of the workers. Gendarmes, Cossacks, Black Hundreds and garrison troops were dispatched to suppress the strike. On the night of December 26, 1905, the Cossacks attacked the strikers and arrested the leader of the strike, Volodymyr Vasiliev.

Later, barricades were erected around the station, and from the morning of 27 December 1905, armed struggle began near the station. By evening, government troops and their supporters had prevailed over the rebels. As a result of the confrontation, more than 50 people died and about 800 were arrested.

On the night of 23 to 24 December 1920, the agitational train "Bolshevik" crashed on the railway bridge over the Mokra Moskovka river, near the Oleksandrivsk-1 station, leaving 29 people dead. In 1930, a small obelisk was erected on the grave of those who died during the train accident, next to the bridge where the accident took place.

The old building of the station was destroyed during the Second World War. The new station building in the Stalinist style was opened on 25 September 1954. According to the book "Architecture of Railway Stations", the project was headed by the architects of "Mostoproject" bureau Viktor Skarzhynskyi, M. Khachaturova and G. Chernyshov, while the sculptural composition above the central entrance of the station is the work of the sculptor Mykhailo Khudas.

In December 1965, the section Lozova — Synelnikove I — Zaporizhzhia was electrified with direct current (=3 kV). In 1969, the electrification of the Zaporizhzhia — Melitopol section was completed.

From 2000 to August 2002, the renovation of the station complex took place. In 2015, as part of decommunization, the hammer and sickle and the five-pointed star were removed from the sculpture on facade of the building, and a clock and the trident were added instead.

After the Russian invasion of Ukraine, the station temporarily serves as a terminus for all trains coming from the north and west of the country. On 29 September 2024, the building of the station was damaged as a result of Russian airstrike targeting the city.

== Facilities ==
The station complex is a structural subdivision of the regional branch Prydniprovska Railways of Ukraine national railway company Ukrzaliznytsia, and includes the station building itself, ticket offices, storage rooms, a baggage room, boarding platforms, a pedestrian underground tunnel, technical buildings, passenger waiting rooms, a cafe and a parking lot. The station is served by a number of municipal bus, trolleybus and tram routes operated by Zaporizhelektrotrans, as well as privately operated busses and minibuses.

On October 14, 2021, the third Tourist Information Center in Zaporizhzhia opened at the railway station.

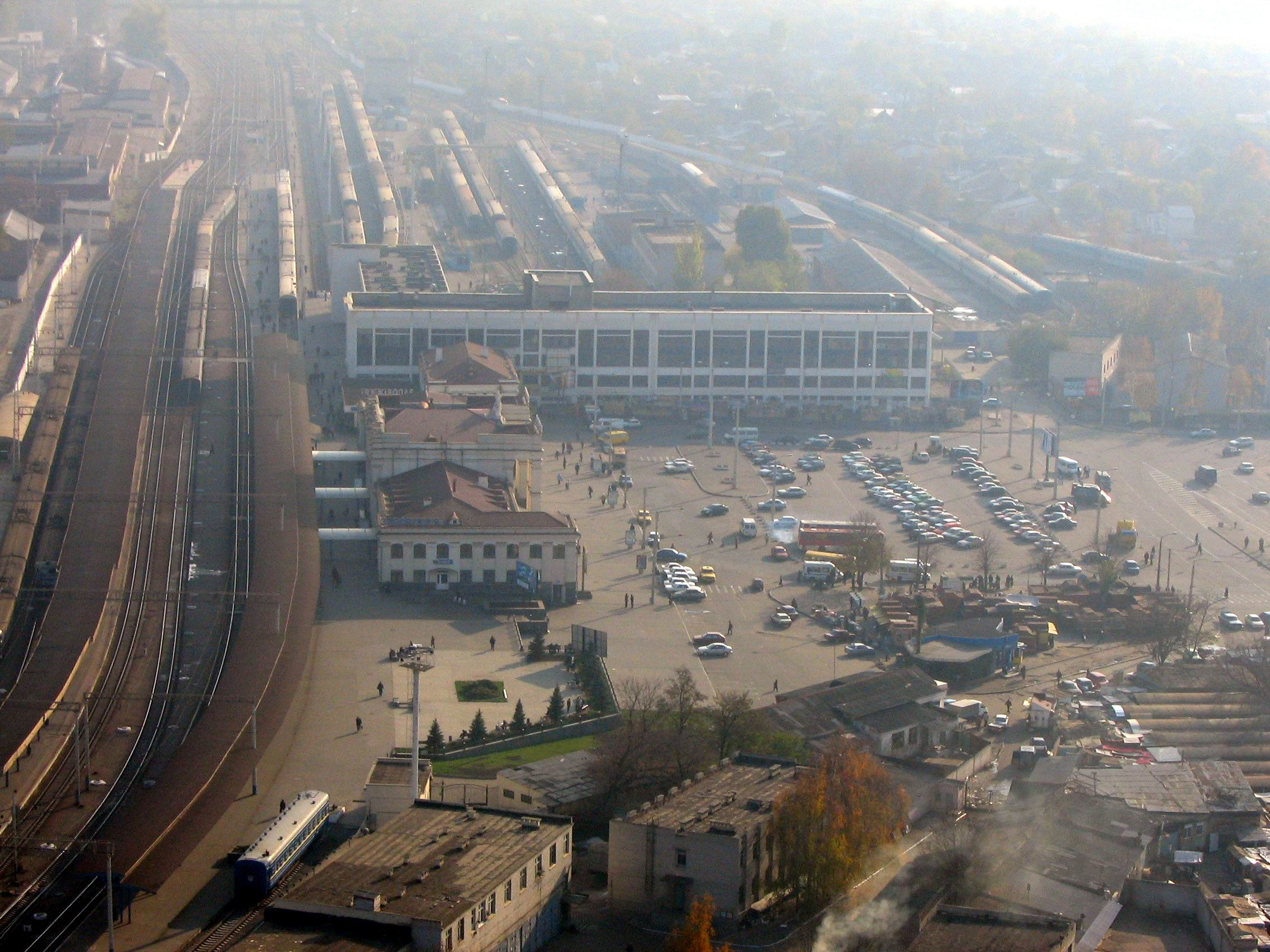
Station square in 2005

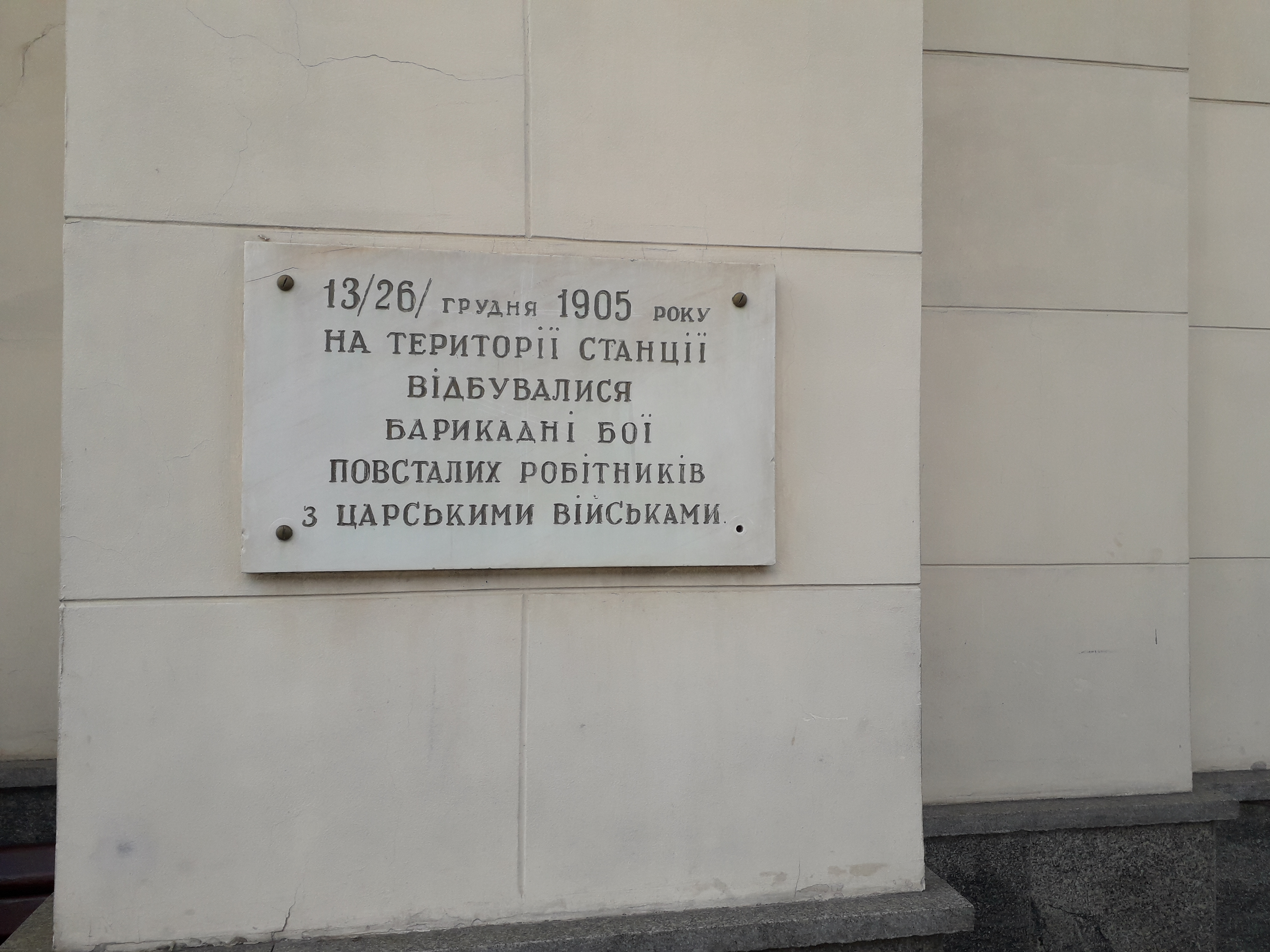
Plaque honoring the 1905 uprising

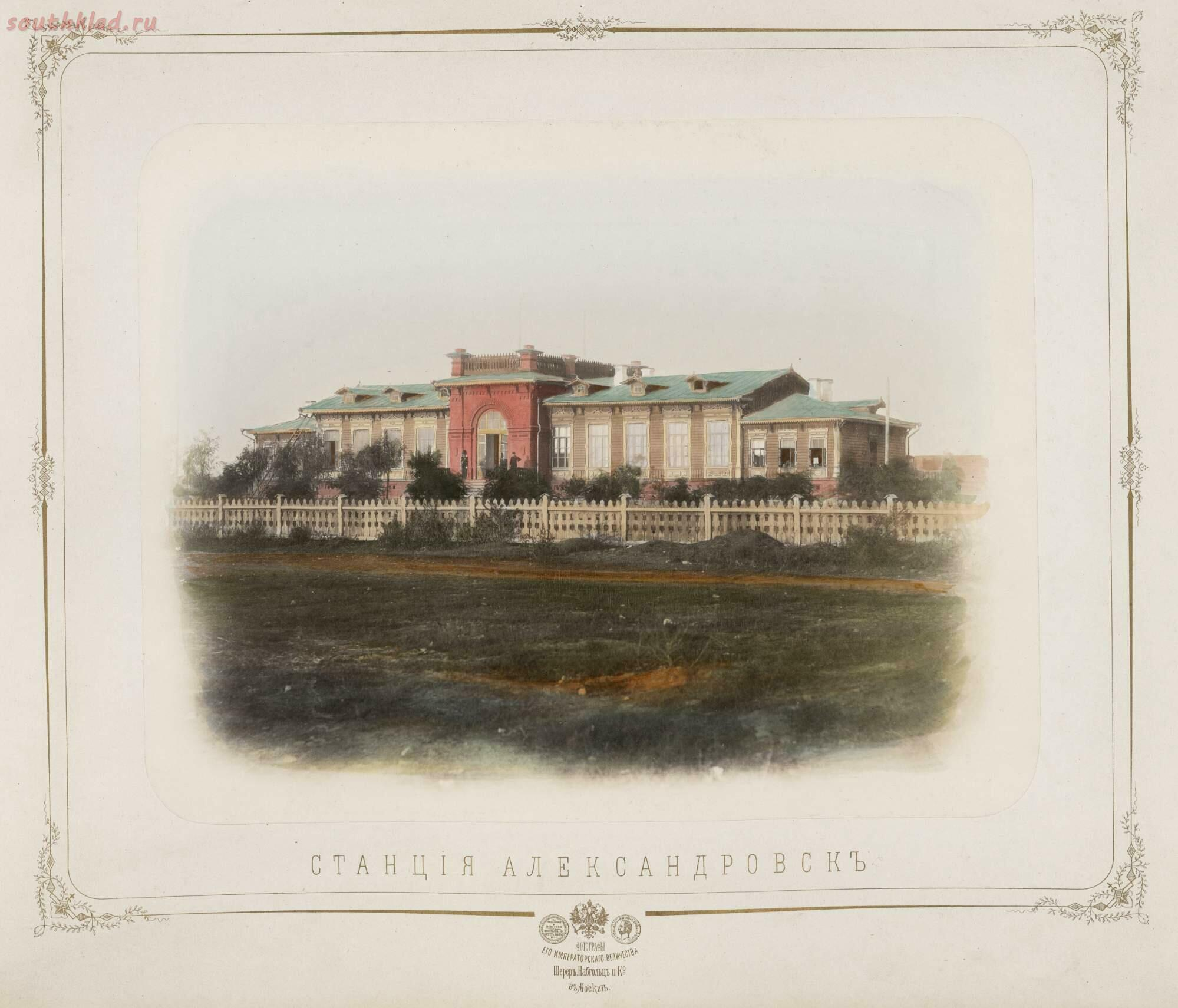
Postcard of the station (c.1880s)

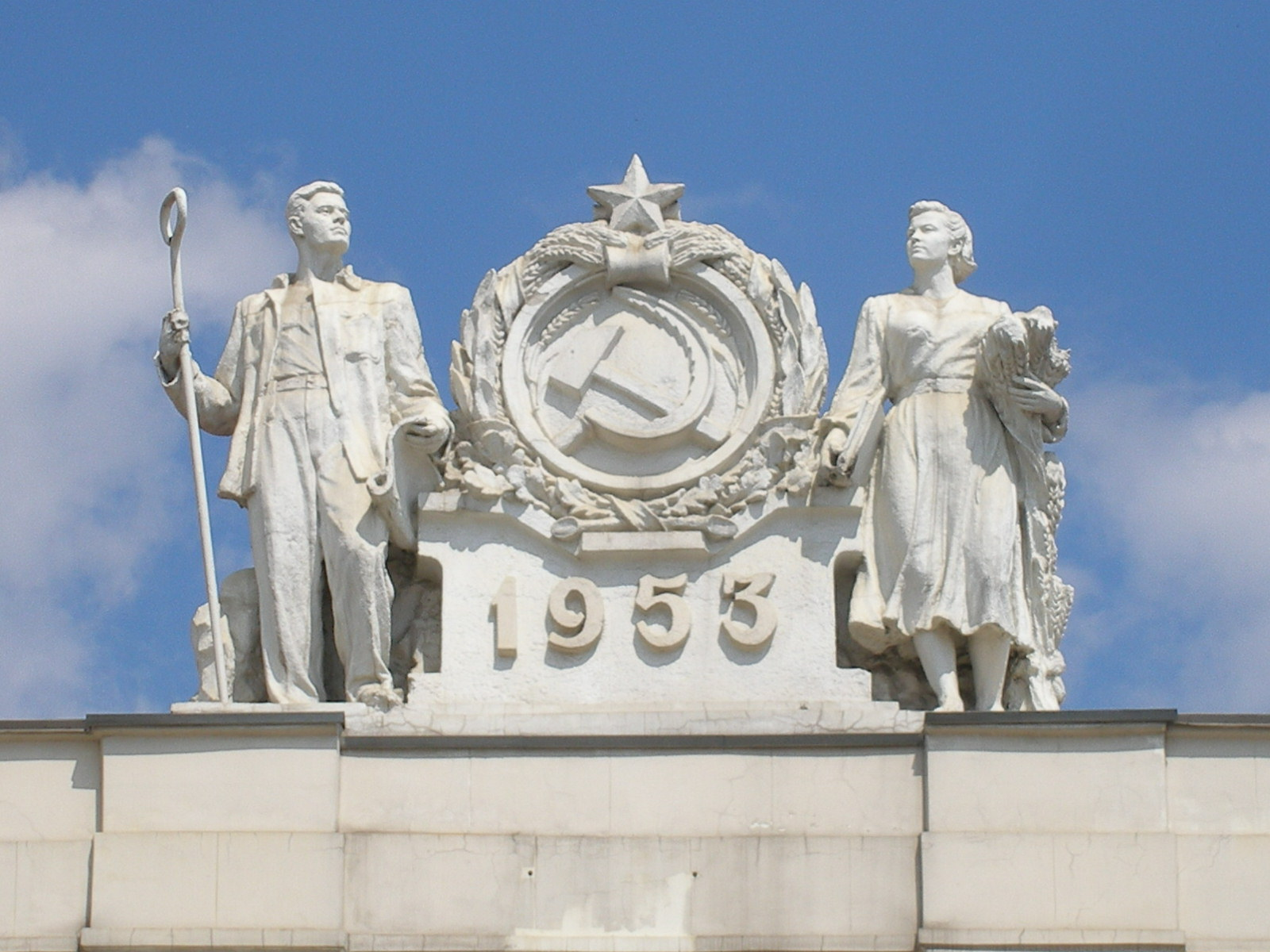
The facade sculpture before decommunization

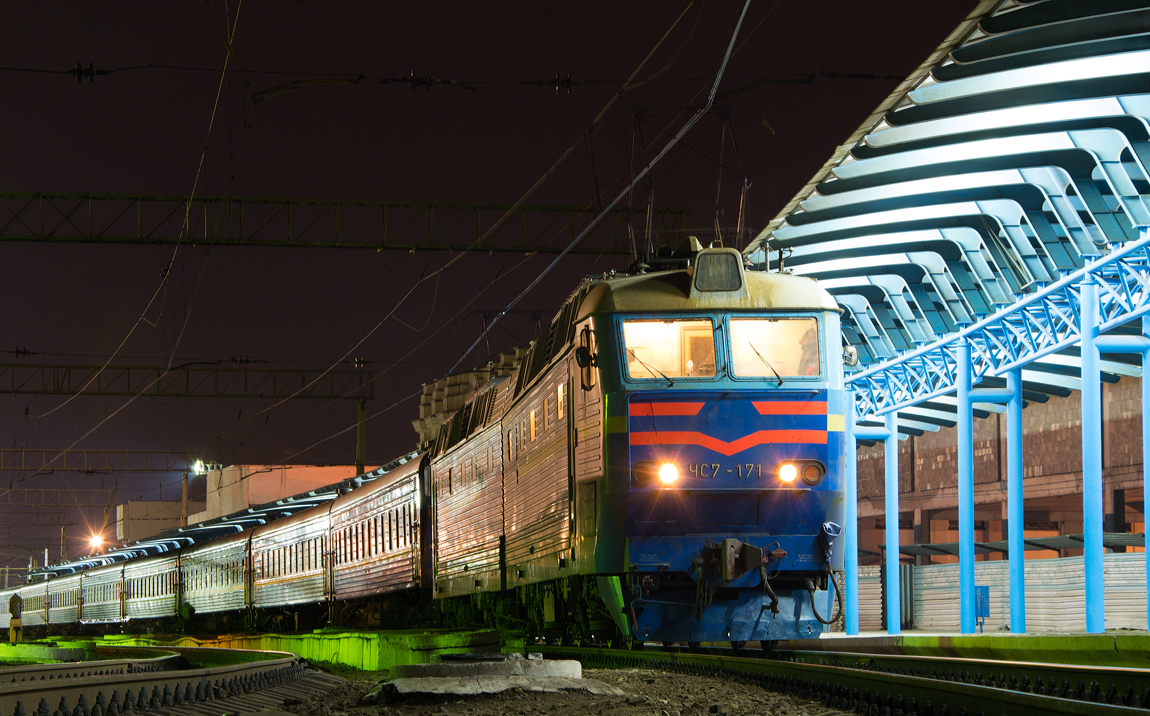

== Sources ==
- Arkhangelsky A. S., Arkhangelsky V. A. Railway stations of the USSR: Directory. In two volumes. — Moscow: "Transport", 1981.
- Ukraine. Atlas of railways. Scale 1:750,000. — Kyiv: "Cartography", 2008. — 80 p. — ISBN 978-966-475-082-7.
- Историческій очеркъ развитія Железныхъ дорог Россіи съ ихъ основанія по 1897 г. включительно. Выпускъ второй. С.-Петербургъ. Типографія Министерства Путей Сообщенія. 1899 г.
- Media related to Zaporizhzhia-1 Railway Station at Wikimedia Commons
