= Sevastopol railway station =

Railway station in Sevastopol, Crimea

Sevastopol Севастополь
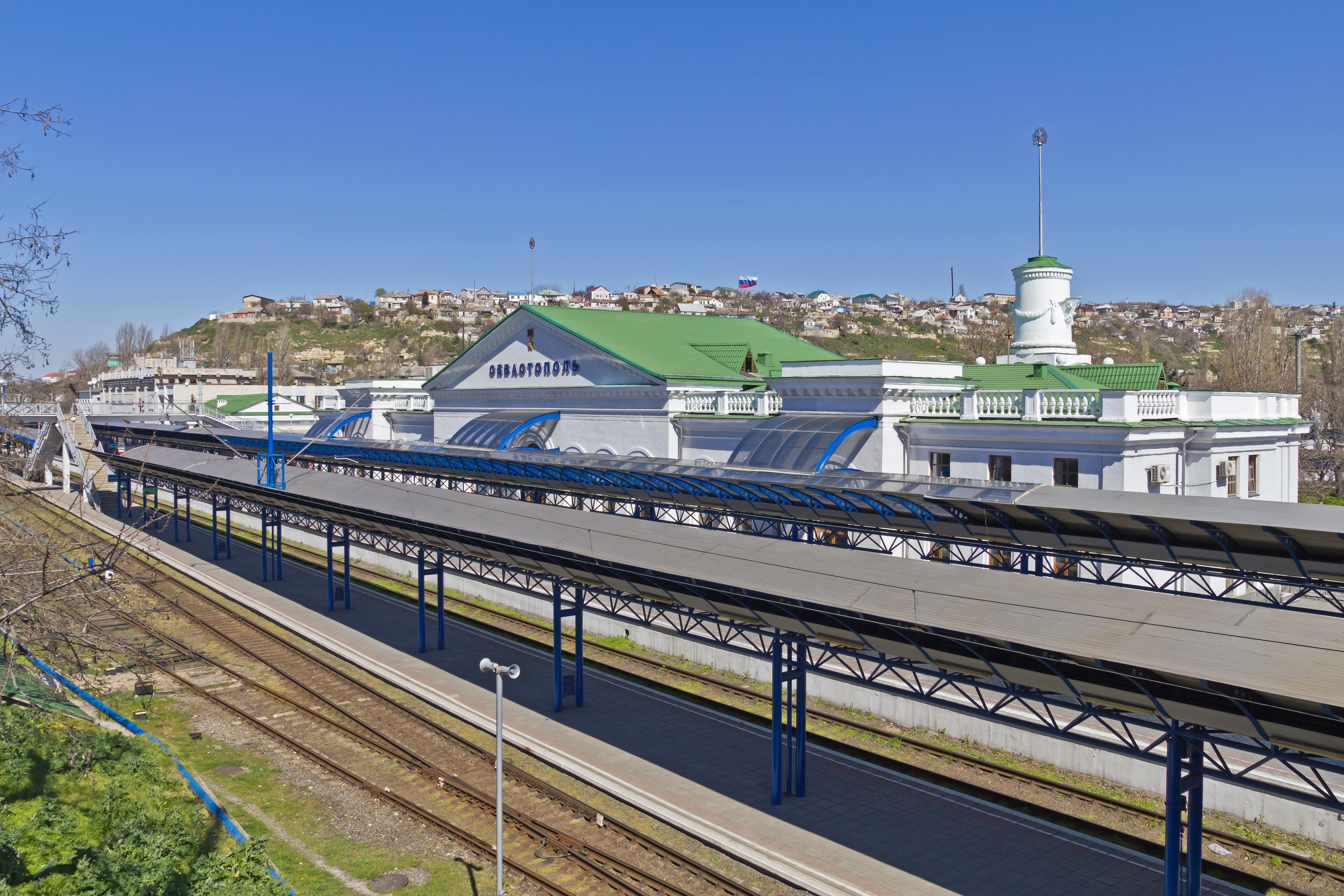
- View of the station from the bridge.

General information
- Location: Sevastopol, Republic of Crimea
- Coordinates: 44.5951°N 33.5291°E
- Operator: Crimea Railway
- Line: Moscow–Sevastopol Main Line
- Platforms: 2 (1 island platform)
- Tracks: 5
- Train operators: De facto: Russian Railways; Crimea Railway

Construction
- Structure type: At-grade

Other information
- Station code: 47330
- Fare zone: 0

History
- Opened: 1875
- Electrified: 1973
- Original company: Cisdnieper Railways

Services
Preceding station	Crimea Railway (de jure Ukrzaliznytsia)	Following station
Inkerman-1 towards Solone Ozero	Solone Ozero–Sevastopol	Terminus
Solyonoye Ozero–Sevastopol
Location

Sevastopol (Russian: Севастополь, Ukrainian: Севастополь) is the main railway station in the city of Sevastopol in Crimea, a territory recognized by a majority of countries as part of Ukraine, but de facto under control and administration of Russia. It is the terminus of the main line Moscow–Sevastopol. The station was opened in 1875.

== History ==
The construction of the Lozova–Sevastopol railway began in 1872 using private funds from Peter Gubonin. In 1873 the railway reached Alexandrovsk, and in 1874 it reached Simferopol. On September 15, 1875, the first train arrived in Sevastopol. As laying the line to Sevastopol required traversing difficult mountainous terrain in the area due to the Makenzijeva mountains, six tunnels were built: Rusks (331 metres (1,086 ft)), Count (the shortest, at 125 metres (410 ft)), White (437 metres (1,434 ft)), Gypsy (the longest, at 507 metres (1,663 ft)), Trinity (294 metres (965 ft)) and Urban (228 metres (748 ft)). The last two tunnels opened at the beginning of the 21st century, are located within the city. The station building itself was constructed near the mouth of South Bay, on a formerly marshy lowland that over the years was covered by earth (and so was called "spit").

The original building was destroyed during the Great Patriotic War. The present railway building was built in 1950. Originally there was a monument to Stalin, but after the exposure of his cult of personality in the 1950s, the monument was demolished. Now there is a small fountain.

On December 27, 2014, after Russia annexed Crimea, long-distance passenger trains were suspended after Ukrainian authorities stopped all the rail connections to Mainland Ukraine, the only trains to the station are the Simferopol–Sevastopol suburban trains, 5 times a day. On December 23, 2019, the passenger trains from Saint Petersburg were launched by the newly opened route passes over the Crimean bridge.

== Destinations ==
=== Major destinations ===
Federal subject	Destinations	Operator(s)	Ref.
(Republic of Crimea (Russia)) Crimea	Yevpatoria	Southern Suburban Passenger Company	
(Republic of Crimea (Russia)) Crimea	Simferopol	Southern Suburban Passenger Company	

=== Inter-connection to Mainland Russia ===
Train number	Train name	Destinations	Operator(s)	Ref.
7/8	Tavria	Saint Petersburg	Russian Railways	
91/92	Tavria	Moscow	Russian Railways	
