= Simferopol railway station =

Railway station in Simferopol, Crimea

Coordinates: 44.9616°N 34.0823°E

Simferopol-Passazirsky Симферополь-Пассажирский
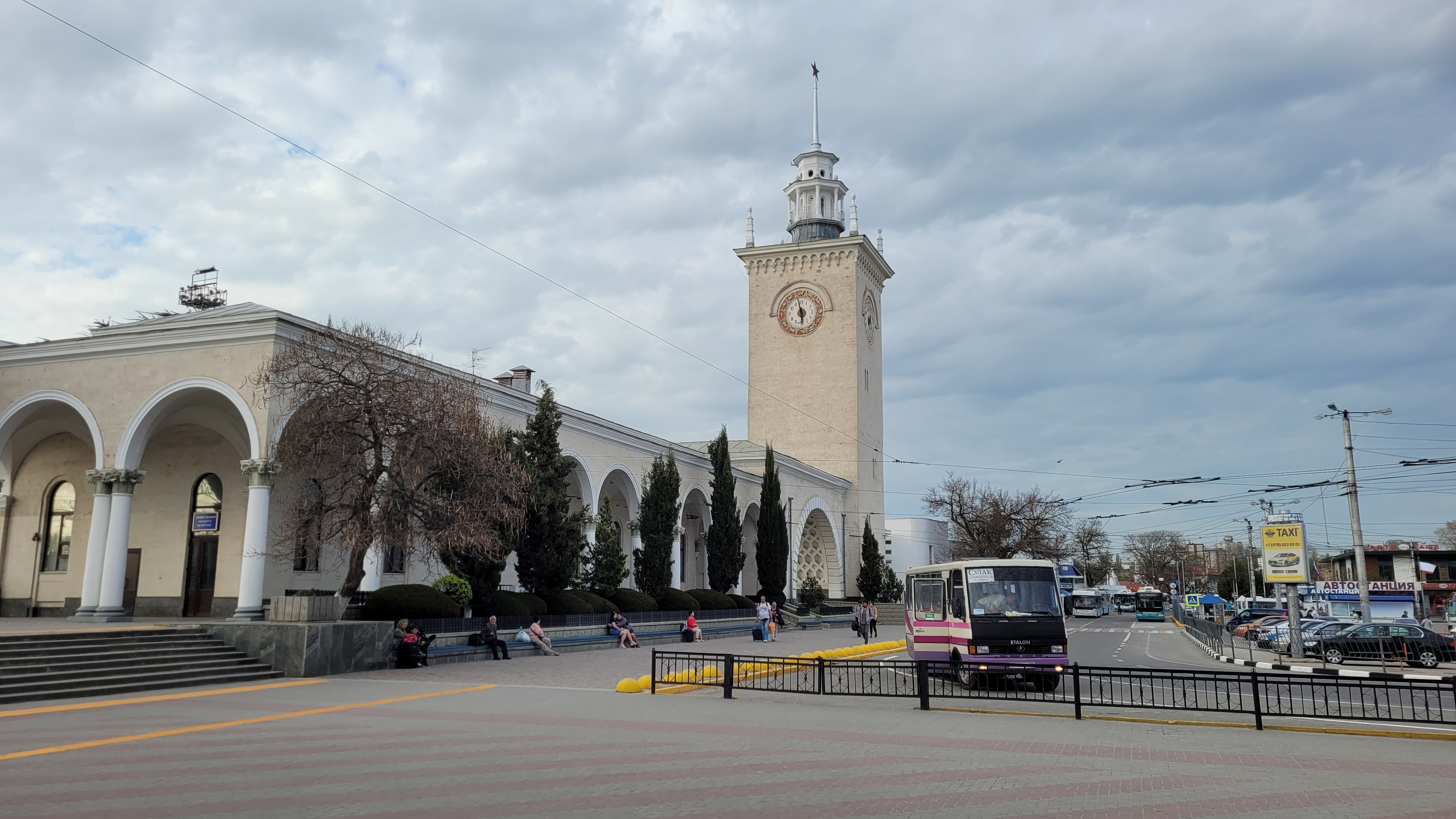
- 2021. Main building

General information
- Location: Simferopol, Republic of Crimea
- Operator: Crimea Railway (de facto)
- Line: Moscow–Sevastopol Main Line
- Platforms: 4 (3 island platforms)
- Tracks: 8

Construction
- Structure type: At-grade
- Parking: Yes
- Architect: Alexey Dushkin
- Architectural style: Stalinist

Other information
- Station code: 473908
- Fare zone: 0

History
- Opened: 14 October 1874
- Opening: 1 June 1874
- Electrified: 1970
- Original company: Cisdnieper Railways

Services
Preceding station	Crimea Railway (de jure Ukrzaliznytsia)	Following station
1457 km towards Solone Ozero	Solone Ozero–Sevastopol	Chystenka towards Sevastopol, Inzhenerna Balka, Zolota Balka or Komyshova Bukhta
1457 km towards Yevpatoria	Yevpatoria–Simferopol	Terminus

Immovable Monument of Local Significance of Ukraine
- Official name: Залізничний вокзал (Railway station building)
- Type: Architecture
- Reference no.: 4796-АР
Solyonoye Ozero–Sevastopol
Location

Simferopol-Pasazhirsky (Ukrainian: Станція Сімферополь-Пасажирський, Russian: Станция Симферополь-Пассажирский,) is a railway station in Simferopol, Crimea, a territory recognized by a majority of countries as part of Ukraine, but de facto occupied by Russia. The station building, designed by a Soviet-Russian architect Alexey Dushkin in 1951 and renovated in 2000, is one of the most recognizable buildings of Simferopol (Aqmescit).

== History ==
=== Russian Empire ===
The lack of a railway in Crimea greatly complicated the Crimean War. After the war, it hampered trade and the development of the economy of Crimea and neighbouring regions.

In the summer of 1871, construction began on the 615-kilometre Lozova–Sevastopol railway. Low-paid jobs in the severe conditions of winter and summer provoked a struggle for basic rights. Some workers went on strike; the largest strike occurred in May 1873 on the Simferopol–Sevastopol segment of the railway.

Construction near Simferopol started in 1872. The Lozova–Sevastopol railway was planned to have passed about 32 kilometres west of Simferopol, but industrialists and merchants there, aware of the benefits a railway would bring to the city, pushed successfully for the route to be revised. Officials and landowners in Simferopol provided free land for the station and locomotive depot.

The first section of the railway – Lozova–(Zaporizhzhya) Aleksandrovsk, with a branch in (Dnipro) Ekaterinoslav – was commissioned on 15 November 1873. The second, (Zaporizhzhya) Aleksandrovsk–Melitopol, opened on 23 July 1874. On 1 June 1874, the first freight train arrived at the Simferopol station. On 14 October 1874, the 367-kilometre Melitopol–Simferopol segment opened, and the first passenger train arrived at the station. The 116-kilometre Simferopol–Sevastopol segment was built in 1875. On 5 January, the full Lozova–Simferopol line began operations.

In 1909, freight trains brought almost 11 million pounds of cargo to Simferopol. The development of industry in Crimea demanded the import of oil, coal, iron, steel, sheet metal, rail, scaffolding, and stone. Exports from Crimea consisted mainly of agricultural products: fruits, vegetables, tobacco, wine, and lime.

=== Occupation by the Nazis ===
From 1916 to 1944, the Simferopol station was operated by a group of Soviet soldiers under the leadership of Viktor Yefremov. Before the Second World War Yefremov was deputy head of the station. During the war, Nazi occupiers killed his wife. He was offered a job with the Third Reich and then the position of "Russian chief of station".

Instead, Yefremov organized a clandestine group of station workers. They committed 17 acts of sabotage, including blowing up nine trains carrying ammunition and two carrying fuel. Under various pretexts, they delayed the repair of rolling stock, contaminated equipment, and passed on intelligence on the quantity and movement of goods, equipment, and troops.

In early March 1944, the Nazis arrested Yefremov and other members of his team. One member, A. A. Breyer, not wanting to surrender to the Nazis, threw himself under a train.

In 1972, a memorial plaque was installed at the station with bas-reliefs of Yefremov and his band: Breyer, V. Lavrinenko, I. Levitsky, and N. Y. Sokolov. The monument was made by sculptors V. V. Petrenko and N. I. Petrenko.

=== Ukraine ===
In 1991, the station was part of Cisdnieper Railways a subdivision of Ukrainian Railways. Long-distance trains provide connections to every major Ukrainian city of Kyiv, Donetsk, Luhansk, Sumy, Kharkiv, Lviv, Dnipro, Khmelnytskyi, Kremenchuk, Kryvyi Rih and Odesa. They also had international connections with Russia, and Belarus.

=== Under "de facto" control by Russian Federation ===
On 18 March 2014, after Russia annexed Crimea, Ukrainian authorities stopped all the rail connections to Mainland Ukraine, and as the result, fewer trains served the Simferopol station. The station became operated by Crimea Railway as part of the Russian government. On 25 December 2019, the passenger train to Moscow was resumed via a new route, following the opening ceremony of Crimean Bridge. However, Cisdnieper Railway still claims to be part of it.

== Destinations ==
=== Major destinations ===
Federal subject	Destinations	Operator(s)	Ref.
(Republic of Crimea (Russia)) Crimea	Yevpatoria	Southern Suburban Passenger Company	
(Republic of Crimea (Russia)) Crimea	Solyonoye Ozero	Southern Suburban Passenger Company	
(Republic of Crimea (Russia)) Crimea	Urozhaynaya	Southern Suburban Passenger Company	
(Republic of Crimea (Russia)) Crimea	Dzhankoi	Southern Suburban Passenger Company	
(Republic of Crimea (Russia)) Crimea	Feodosia	Southern Suburban Passenger Company	
Sevastopol	Sevastopol	Southern Suburban Passenger Company	

=== Inter-connection to Mainland Russia ===
Train number	Train name	Destinations	Operator(s)	Ref.
27/28	Tavria 2-storey	Moscow	Russian Railways	
75/76	Tavria	(Omsk Oblast) Omsk	Russian Railways	
95/96	Tavria	(Astrakhan Oblast) Astrakhan	Russian Railways	
141/142	Tavria	(Perm Krai) Perm	Russian Railways	
373/374	Tavria	(Smolensk Oblast) Smolensk	Russian Railways	

== Gallery ==
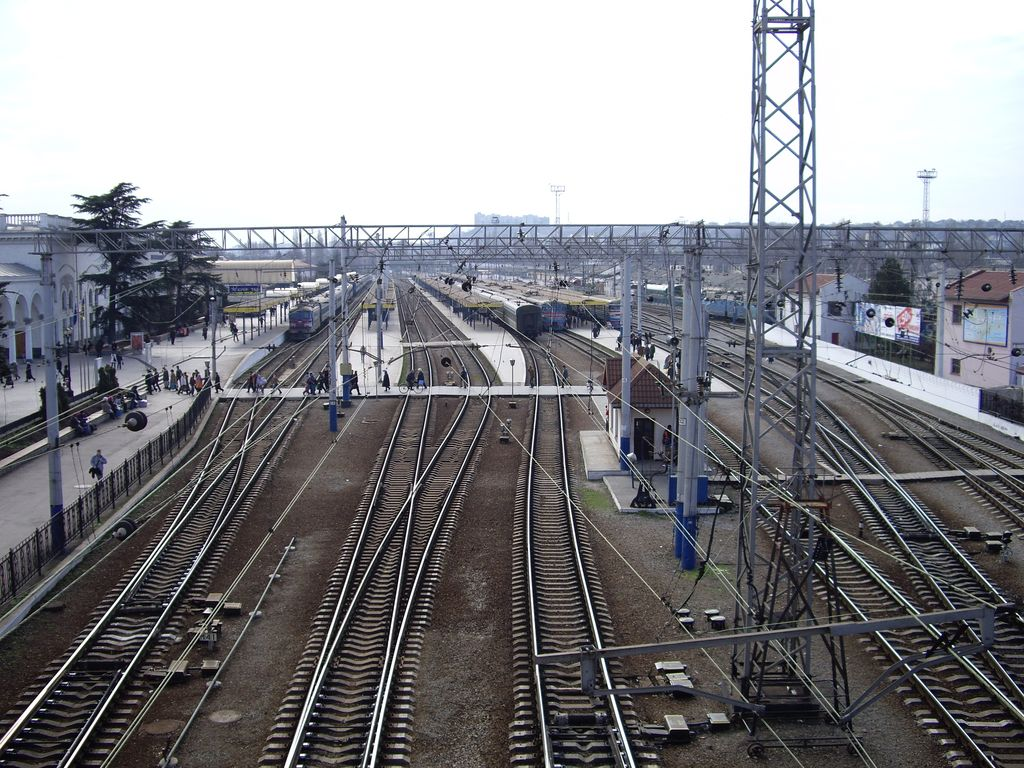
Platforms of the station.

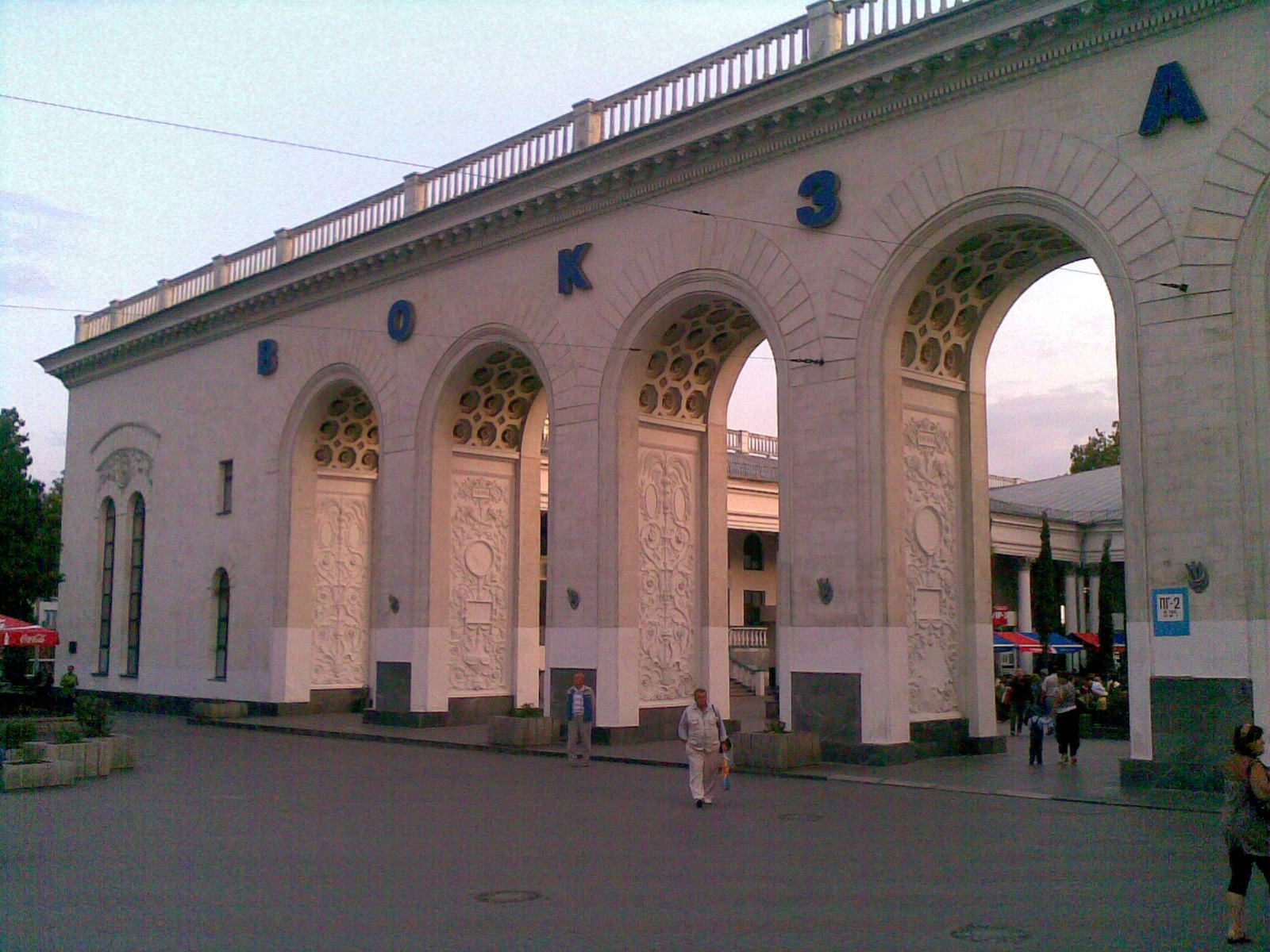
Main building.

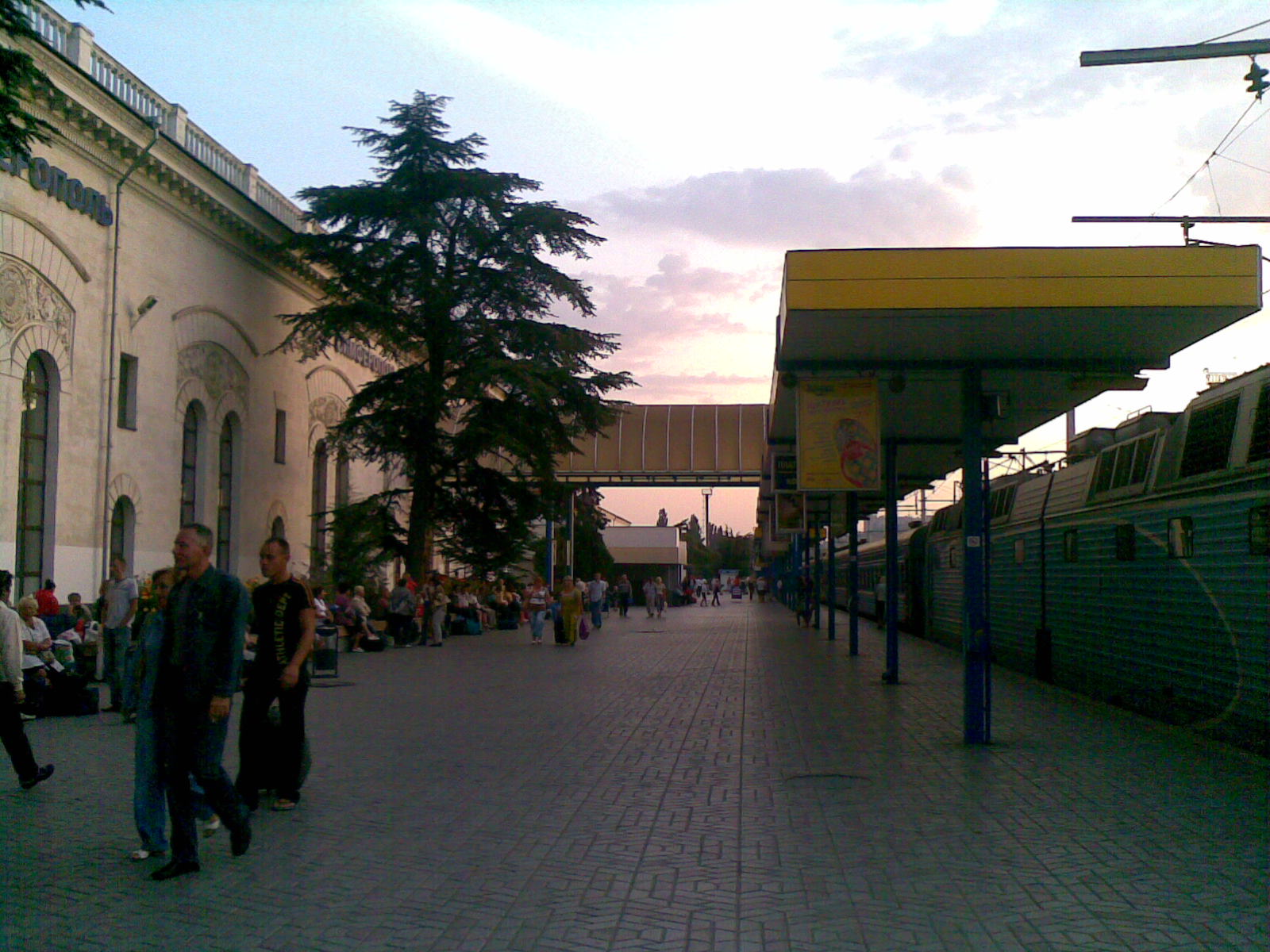
Platform 1.

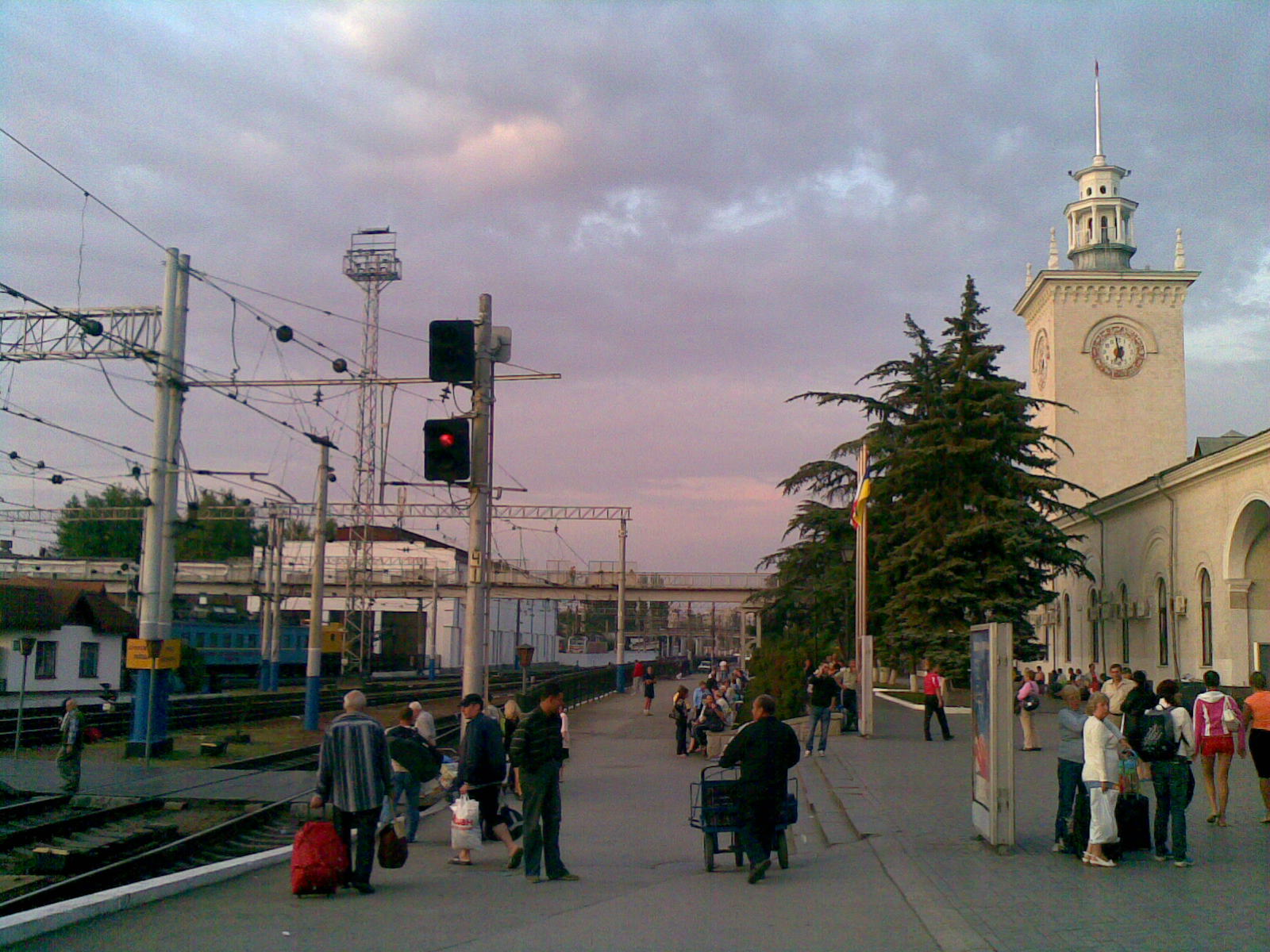
Clock Tower.

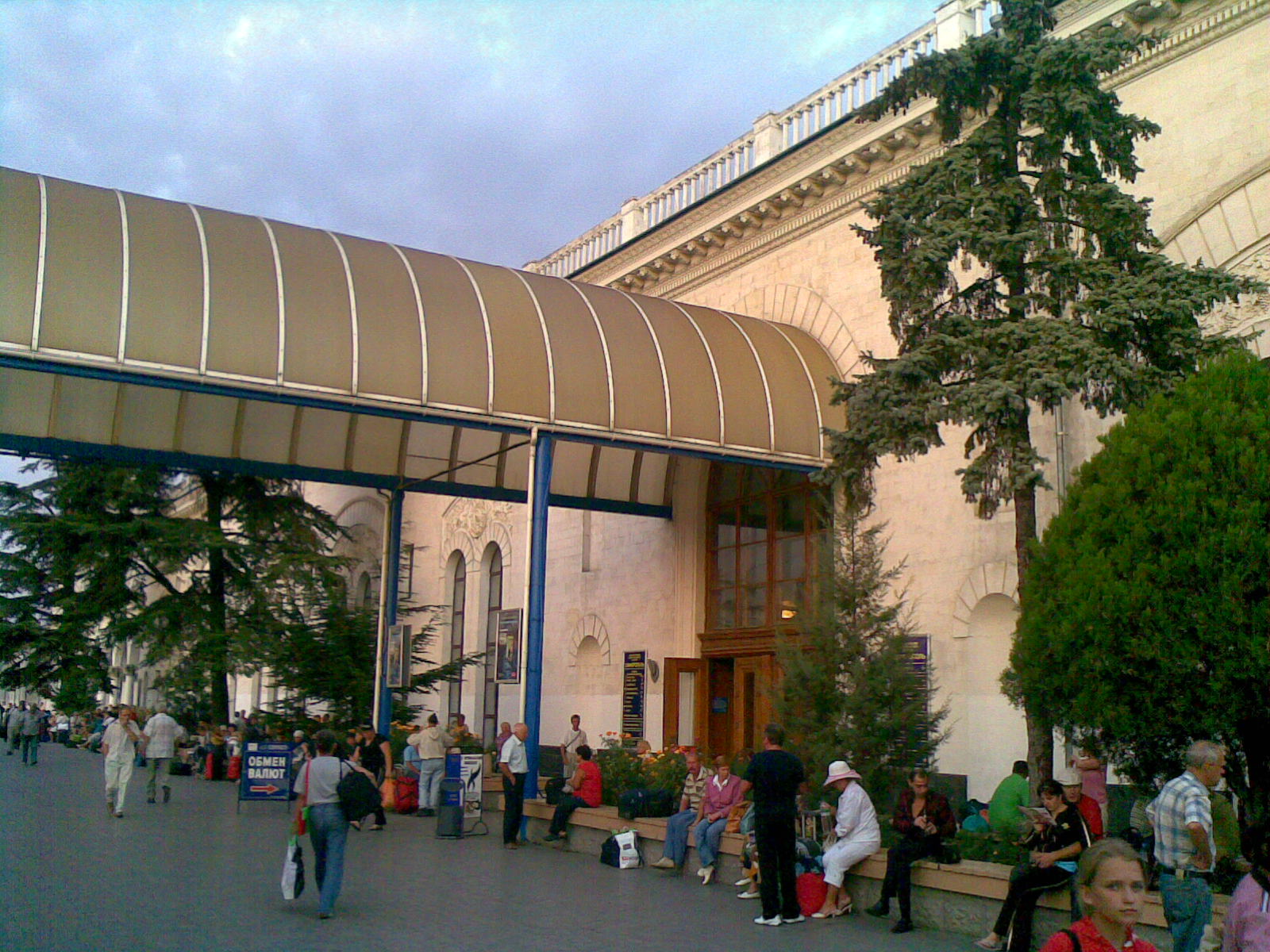
Exit to platform 1.

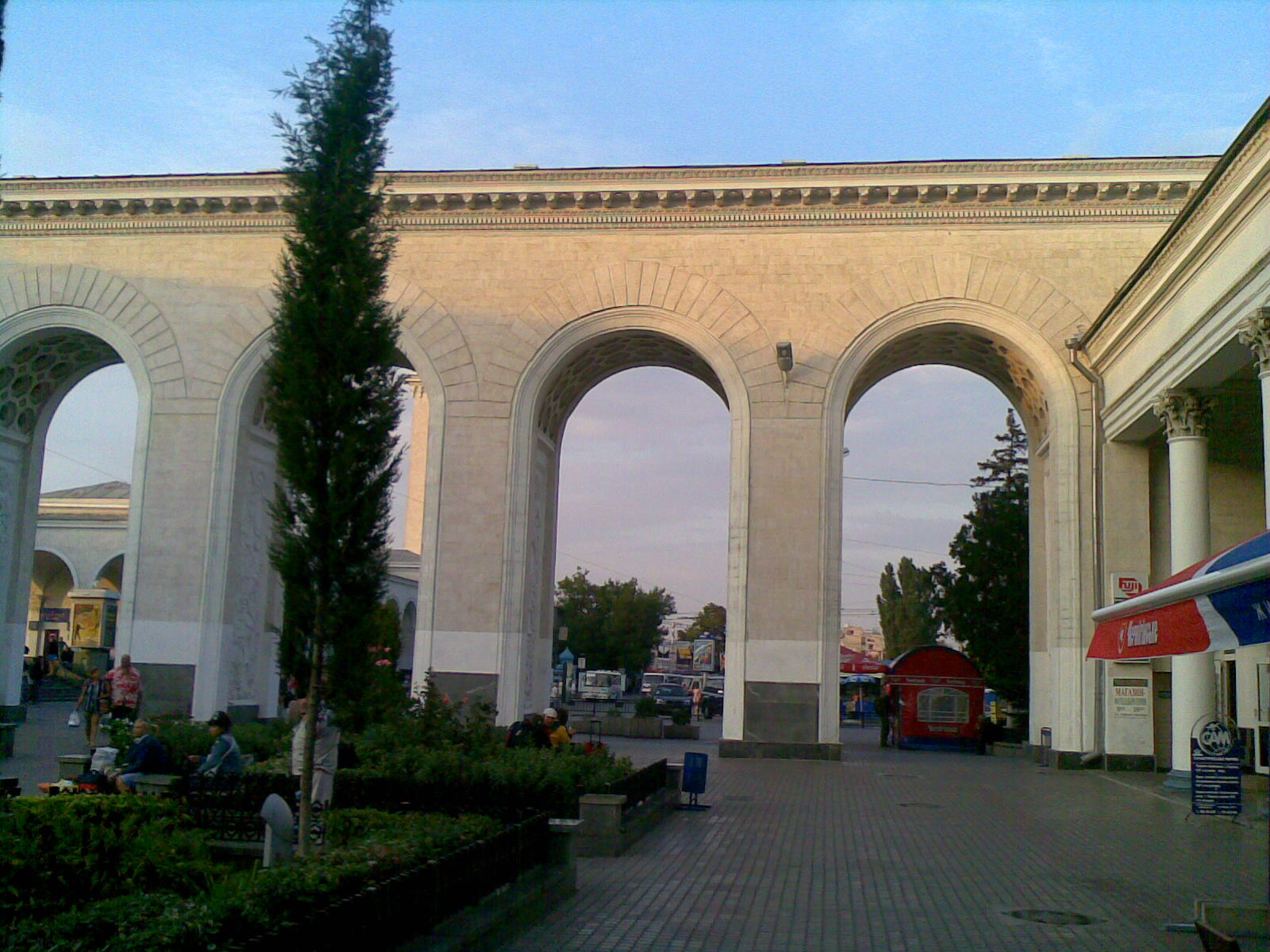
Italian garden.

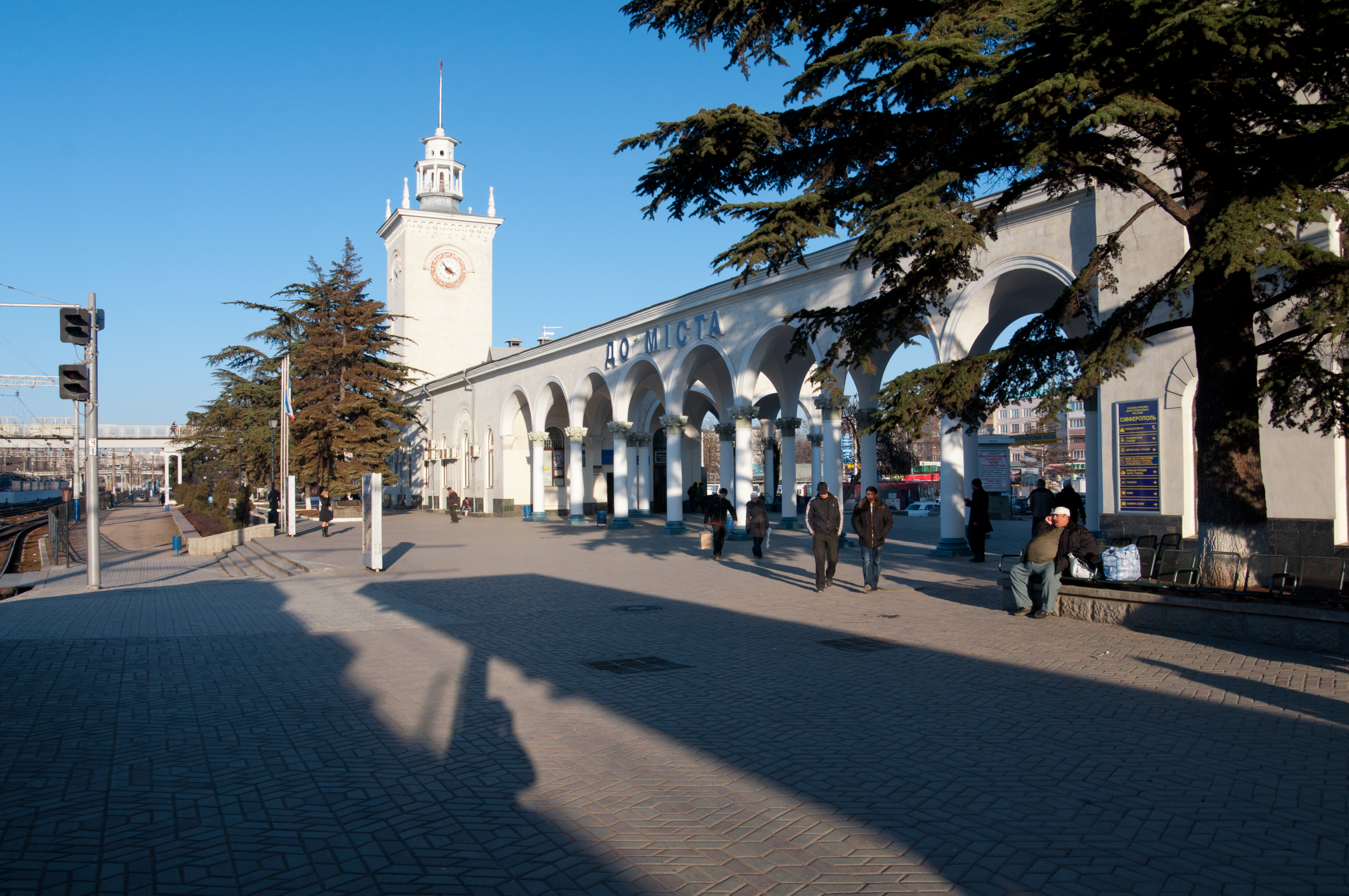
View of the station from Platform 1.
