= Dzhankoi railway station =

Railway station in Dzhankoi, Crimea

Coordinates: 45.6986°N 34.3819°E

Dzhankoi
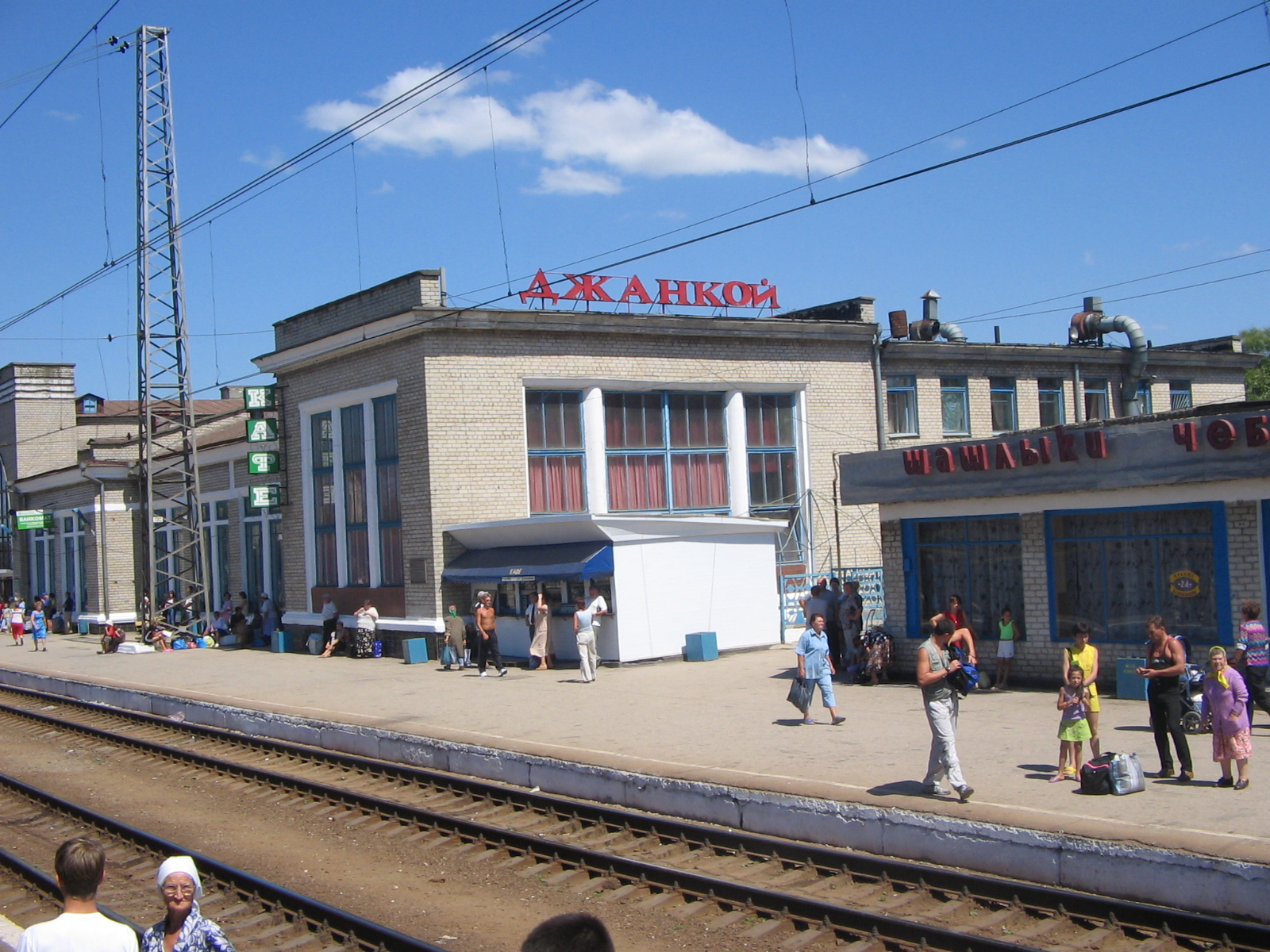
- View of the station from platform 2

General information
- Location: Disputed: Ukraine (de jure); Russia (de facto); Dzhankoi
- Owner: Disputed: Ukrainian Railways (Near-Dnipro Railways) (Ukraine, de jure); Crimea Railway (Russia, de facto)
- Platforms: 2 (1 island platform)
- Tracks: 5

Construction
- Parking: yes

Other information
- Station code: 470007
- Fare zone: 0

History
- Opened: 1874
- Electrified: 1970 (Moscow–Sevastopol Main line)

Services
Preceding station	Crimea Railway (de jure Ukrzaliznytsia)	Following station
1370 km towards Solone Ozero	Solone Ozero–Sevastopol	1379 km towards Sevastopol, Inzhenerna Balka, Zolota Balka or Komyshova Bukhta
Bohemka towards Armiansk	Armiansk–Dzhankoi	Terminus
Terminus	Dzhankoi–Feodosia	Azovska towards Feodosia
Location

Dzhankoi railway station (Russian: Джанкой, Ukrainian: Джанкой, Crimean Tatar: Canköy) is in Dzhankoi, northern Crimea, and is one of the biggest railway stations of Crimea, a territory recognized by a majority of countries as part of Ukraine, but de facto under control and administration of Russia.

== History ==
The station opened on the Melitopol–Simferopol rail line in 1874. It became a hub in 1892. The railway junction was twice destroyed, during the Russian Civil War and Great Patriotic War.

In 2006–2007 the station was renovated and divided into two parts: the commuter station and the main station. The suburban station was built from scratch using high platforms (to stop the trains) and turnstile system. After the reconstruction of the building and the area of the main station, the place has become popular with residents.

As of 26 March 2014 Dzhankoi was one of two stations (along with Sevastopol) of the Crimea Railway that used an automated system of control over fares.

== Trains ==
- Moscow – Simferopol (via Rostov-on-Don and Port Kavkaz)
- Simferopol – Solyonoye Ozero
- Feodossia – Armiansk
- Dzhankoi – Kerch
