= Crimean Directorate of Railway Transportation =

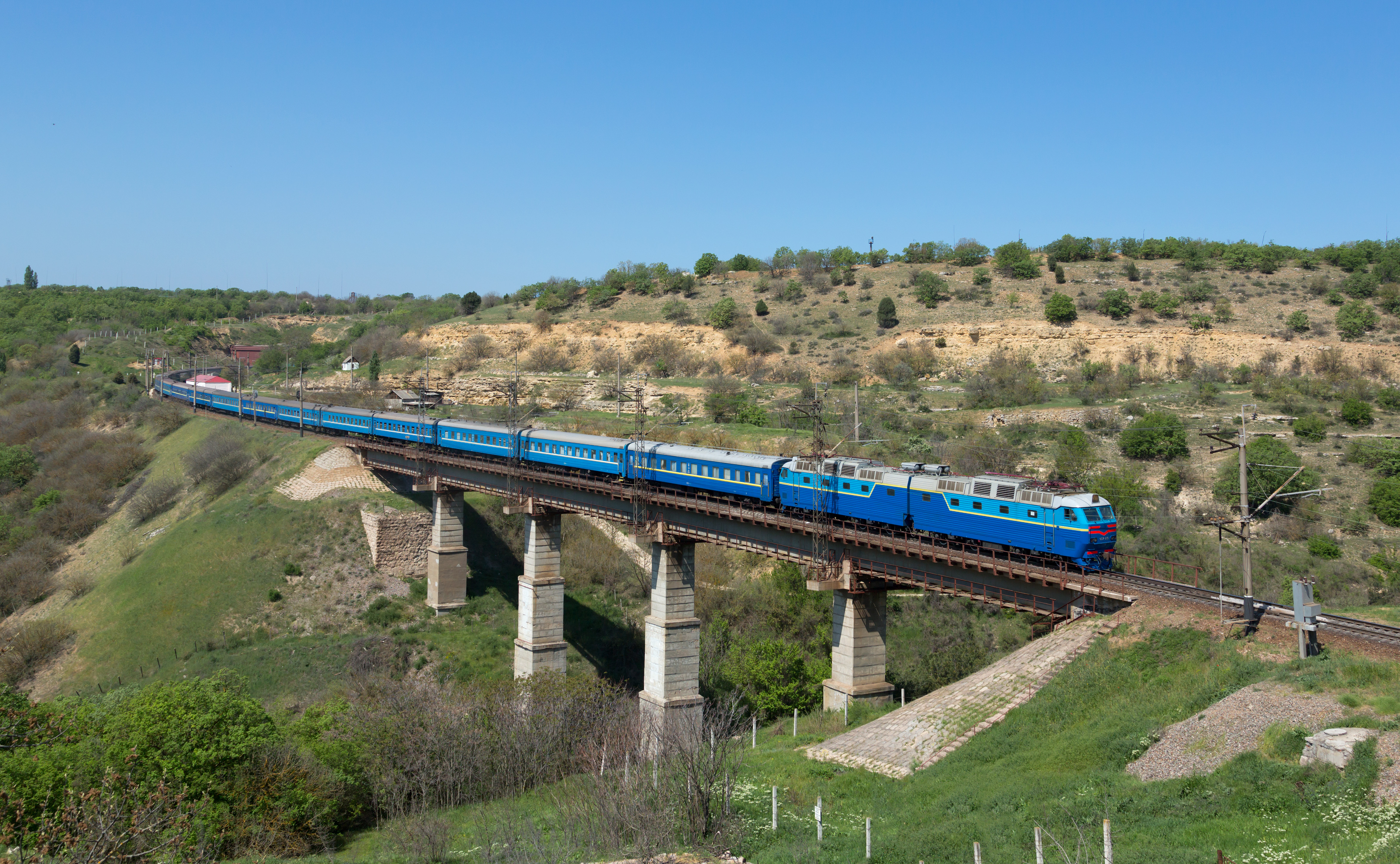
UZ ChS7 Bakhchysarai - Inkerman.jpg

Crimean Directorate of Railway Transportation – directorate of Near-Dnipro Railways (branch of Ukrzaliznytsya). Management services to the Autonomous Republic of Crimea and Sevastopol. By March 2014 also south-eastern part of Kherson and south-western parts of Zaporozhye region. In the management of living about 2.5 million people.

March 15, 2014 as a result of the annexation of Crimea by Russia actually came under the management of Russian Railways called "FSUE "Crimea Railway"". Location management – Simferopol station. Other major stations – Dzhankoy, Sevastopol, Evpatoria resort, Feodosia and Kerch.

== History ==
The Crimean Peninsula Railway was first established between Sevastopol and Balaklava during the Crimean War (1854–1856) when the region was under British administration. At that time, railroad freight was shipped from Balaklava Bay to support the front lines. However, following the 1856 Treaty of Paris, the British dismantled the railway and sold the tracks to Turkey as part of the peace settlement.

Railway communication between the Crimean Peninsula and mainland Russia was established in 1875. The railway, constructed by Russian businessman P.I. Gubonin, connected Sevastopol to the Lozova station, which was linked to Kharkov and Moscow at that time. In 1895, the railway network was extended to Feodosia. A proposed railway project from Sevastopol to Yalta in the late 1880s and early 1900s was never realized due to the region's high seismic activity, which was deemed dangerous during Soviet times.

== Basic Lines ==
- Electrified single track railway Yevpatoria – Ostryakova
- Electrified single track railway Sevastopol – Simferopol
- No-Electrified single track railway Theodosius – Vladyslavivka (at the station Kerch – Dzhankoi)

== Passenger traffic ==
Crimean crisis in the summer of 2014 passenger traffic increased several times since the railway management activities provided in the most popular area with tourists – in the Crimea. After the cessation of December 27, 2014 of passenger and freight traffic from mainland Ukraine Crimea railroad started to play only local significance.

== Gallery ==
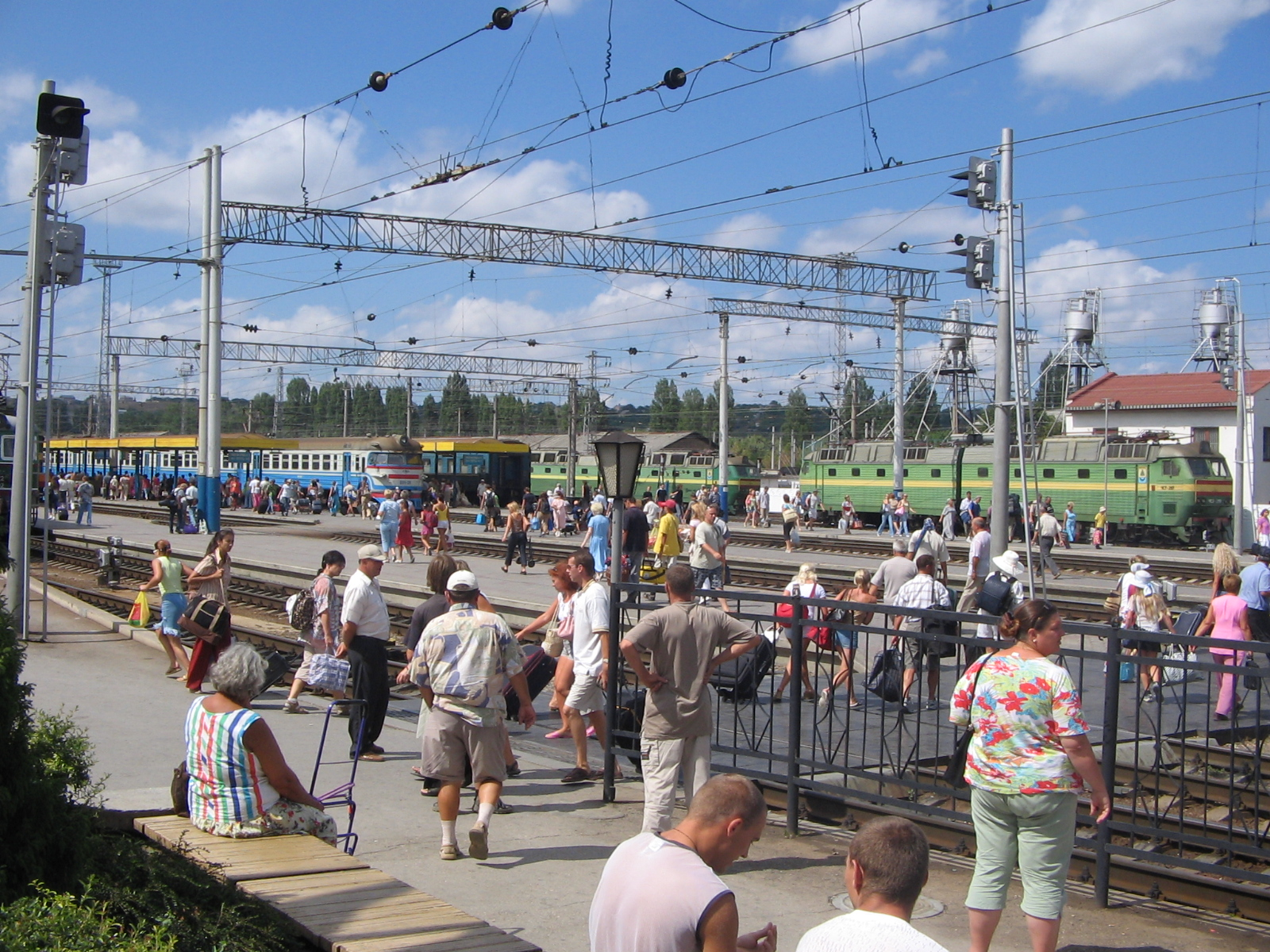
Simferopol Train Station

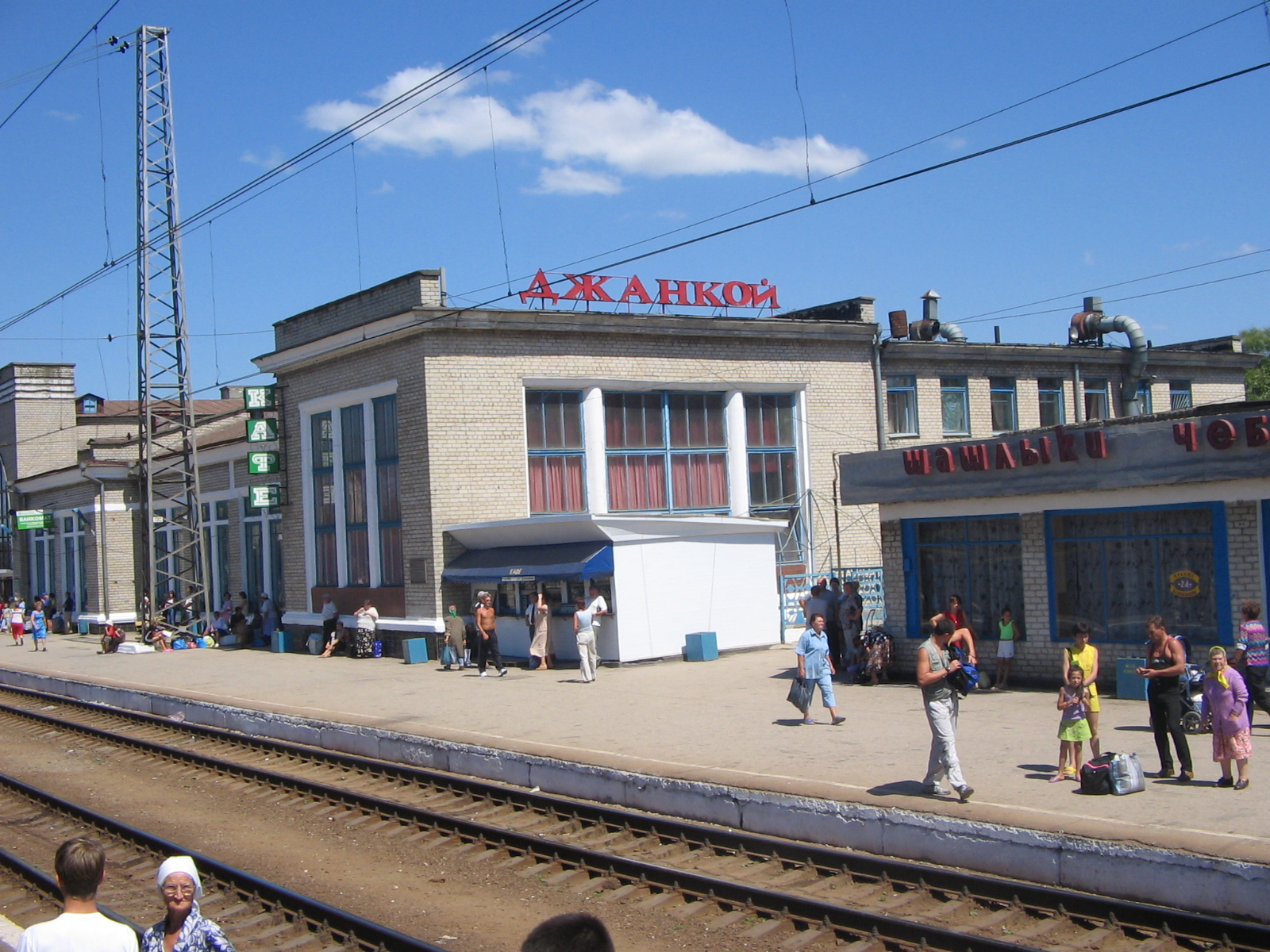
Djankoi Train Station

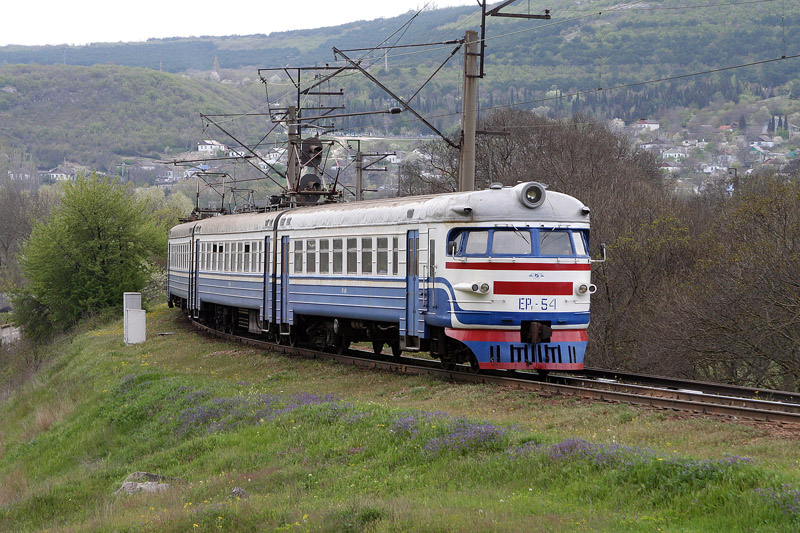
Electric train ″Electrichka″ in Crimea

== See also ==
- Crimean Directorate of Railway Transportation on ukrainian lang.
