= Armiansk railway station =

Railway station in Armiansk, Crimea

Armiansk
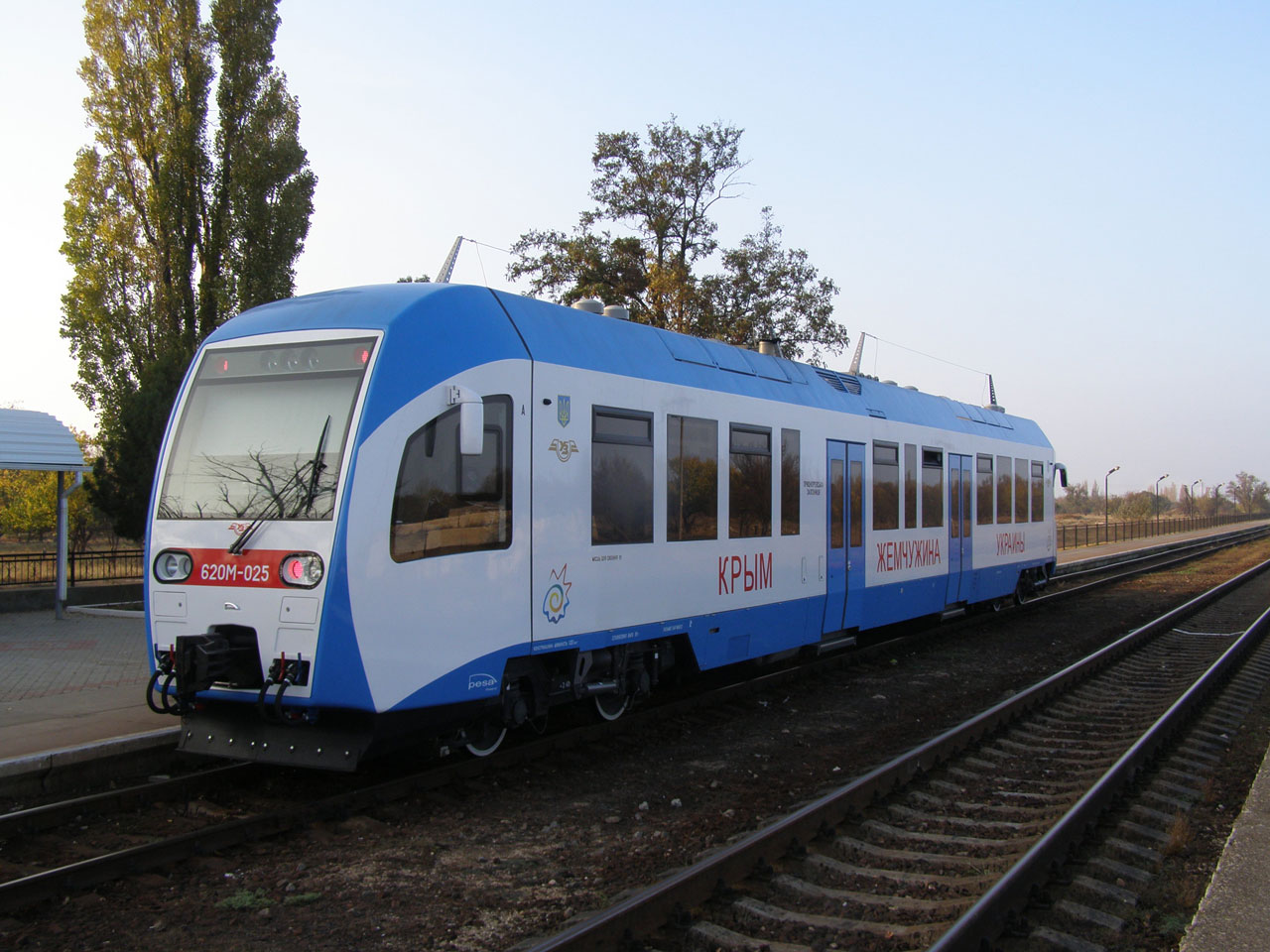
- Ukrainian train on the platform (2012).

General information
- Location: Armiansk
- Coordinates: 46.1161°N 33.7025°E
- Owner: Disputed: Ukrainian Railways (Near-Dnipro Railways) (Ukraine, de jure); Crimea Railway (Russia, de facto)
- Platforms: 2
- Tracks: 3

Construction
- Parking: yes

Other information
- Station code: 472515 (old)/869614 (new)
- Fare zone: 6

History
- Opened: 1935

Services
Preceding station	Ukrainian Railways	Following station
De facto operated by Crimea Railway
Terminus	Kherson–Dzhankoi	Yani Kapu toward Dzhankoi
Vadym Suspended since 2014 toward Kherson	Kherson–Dzhankoi	Yani Kapu toward Dzhankoi
Location

Armiansk is a railway station in Armiansk, Crimea, a territory recognized by a majority of countries as part of Ukraine, but de facto under control and administration of Russia.

== History ==
The station was opened in 1935 as a terminus on the Dzhankoy—Armiansk line, but later the line was upgraded to Kherson.

After Crimea was annexed by Russia in 2014 all passenger services between Armiansk and Vadym railway station in Kherson Oblast were suspended. Southbound passenger services from Kherson now terminate at Vadym, 7–8 km north from Armiansk checkpoint.

== Trains ==
After 2014 there is only 1 train, that terminates at this station:

- Armiansk—Feodosia
