= Yevpatoria railway station =

Railway station in Yevpatoria, Crimea

Coordinates: 45.1999°N 33.3550°E

Yevpatoria-Kurort
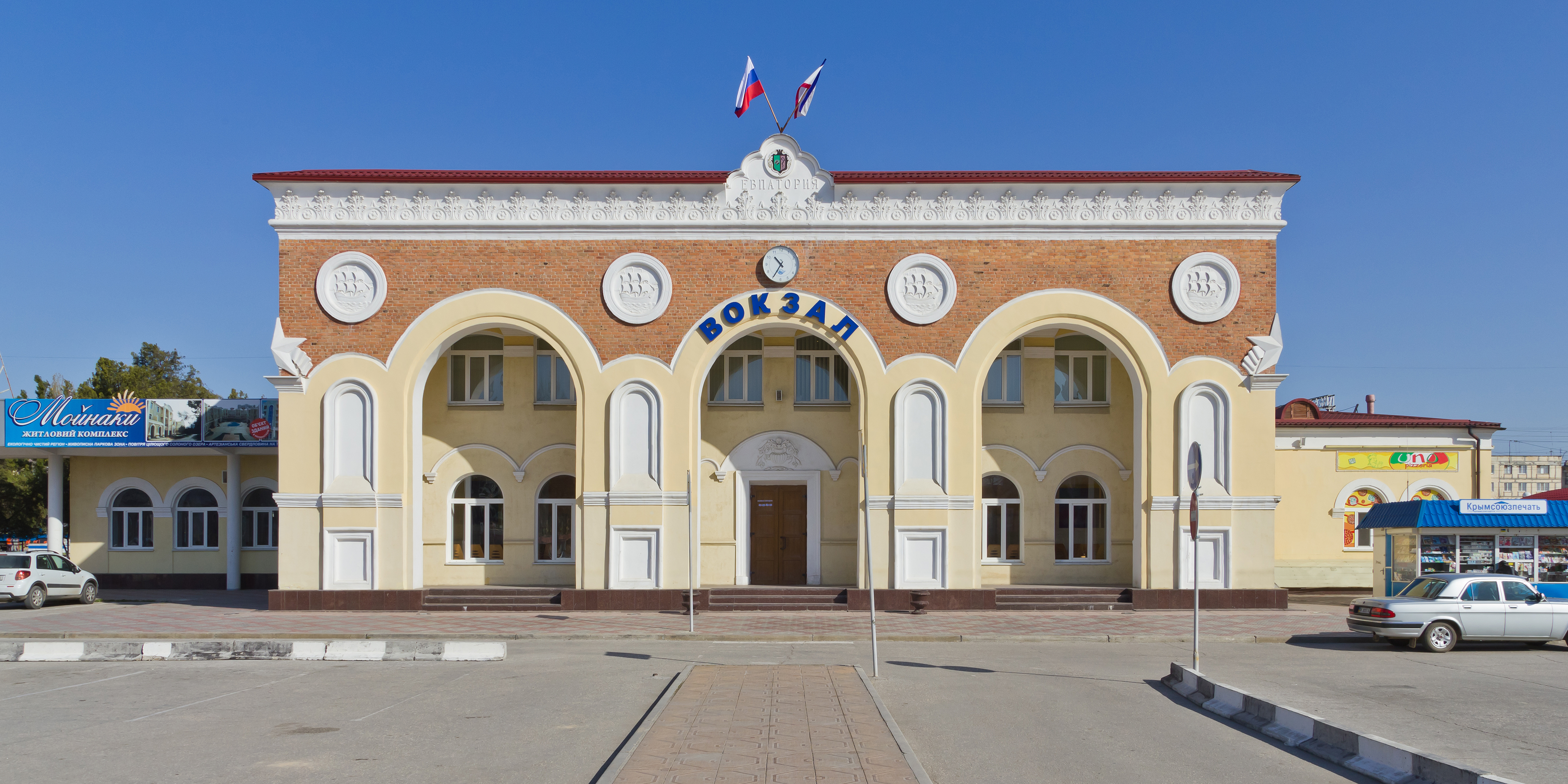
- View of the station from the street.

General information
- Location: Disputed: Ukraine (de jure); Russia (de facto); Yevpatoria
- Owner: Disputed: Ukrainian Railways (Near-Dnipro Railways) (Ukraine, de jure); Crimea Railway (Russia, de facto)
- Platforms: 4 (3 island platforms)
- Tracks: 13

Construction
- Parking: yes

Other information
- Station code: 2078770
- Fare zone: 4

History
- Opened: 1915
- Electrified: 1973 (Simferopol—Yevpatoria Main line)

Services
Preceding station	Crimea Railway (de jure Ukrzaliznytsia)	Following station
Terminus	Yevpatoria–Simferopol	Yevpatoria-Vantazhna towards Simferopol
Location

Yevpatoria-Kurort (Russian: Евпатория-Курорт, Ukrainian: Євпаторія-Курорт) is a railway station in Yevpatoria, Crimea, a territory recognized by a majority of countries as part of Ukraine, but de facto under control and administration of Russia.

== History ==
The line Ostrakova — Evpatoria was opened in 1915 after 4 months of construction. During the Great Patriotic War the wooden station building was burned down. The current building was built in 1953 by architect Alexey Dushkin. In the 1970s and 1980s a locomotive depot, an electric shop, underpass and cash pavilion concourse were built behind the station. In 1974 the first electric train was inaugurated.

== Photos ==
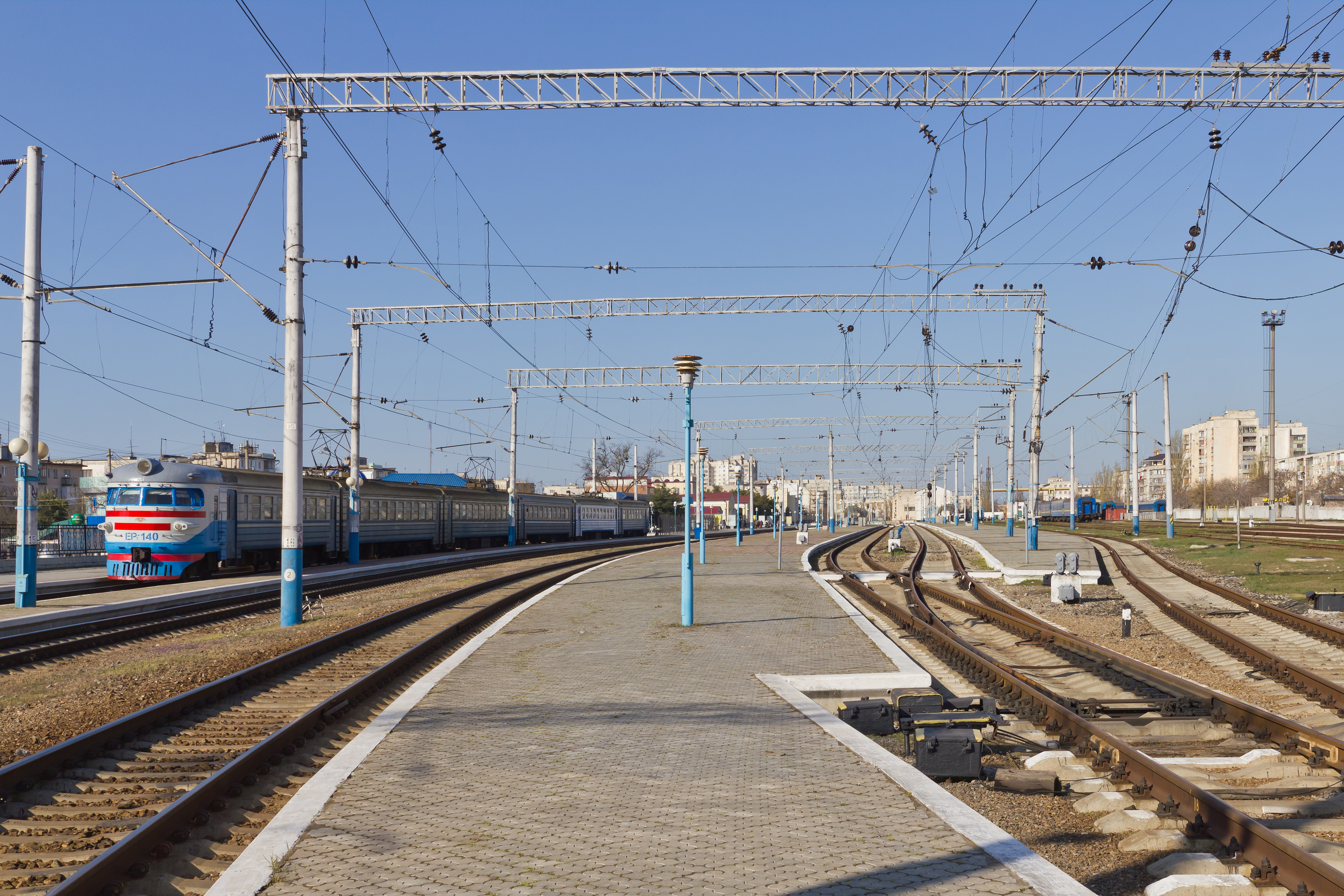
Platform

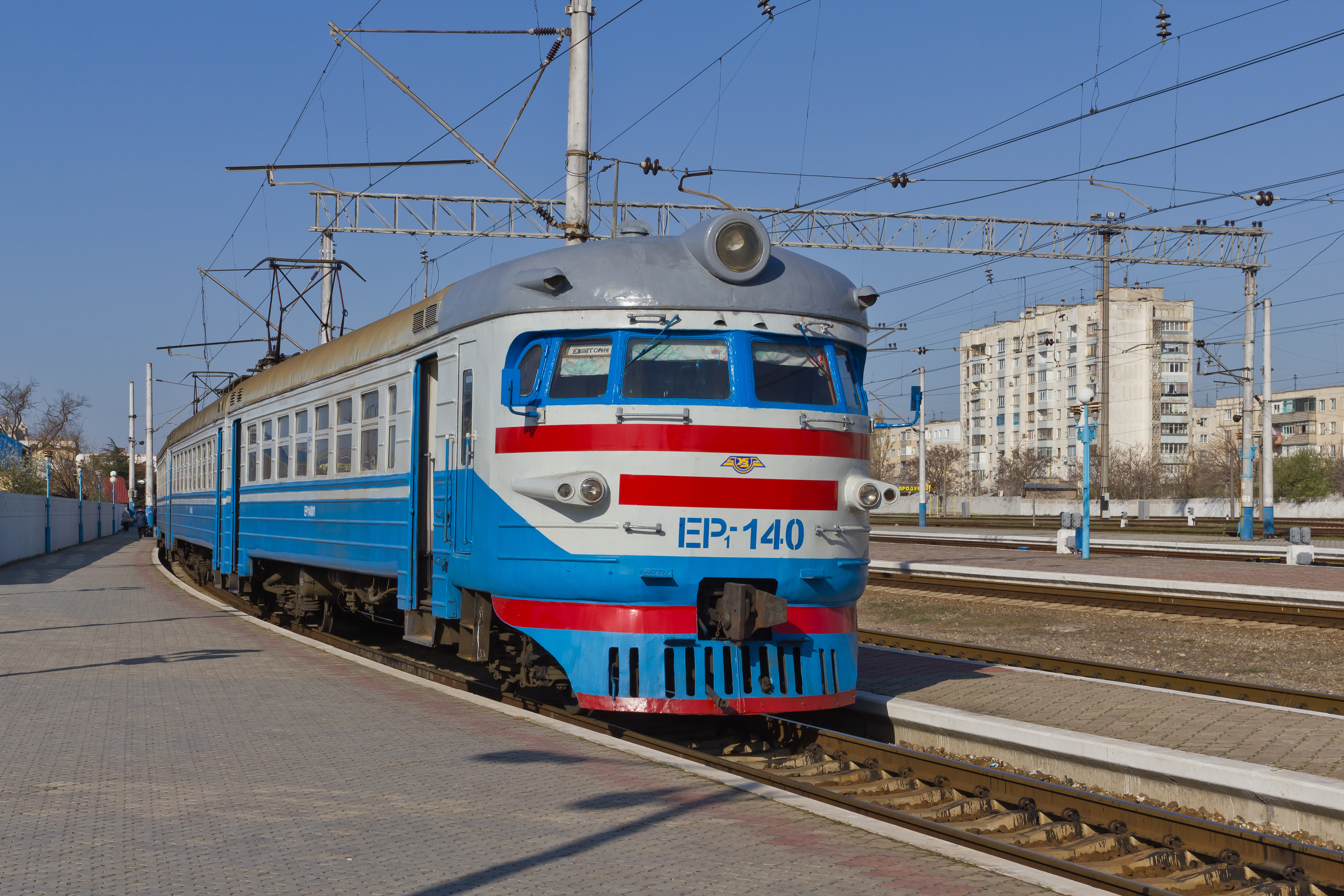
ER1 EMU train from Simferopol

== Trains ==
There are only 4 trains a day that terminate at the station:

- Simferopol — Yevpatoria
