= Crimea Railway =

State-owned railway company in Crimea

Federal State Unitary Enterprise "Crimea Railway"

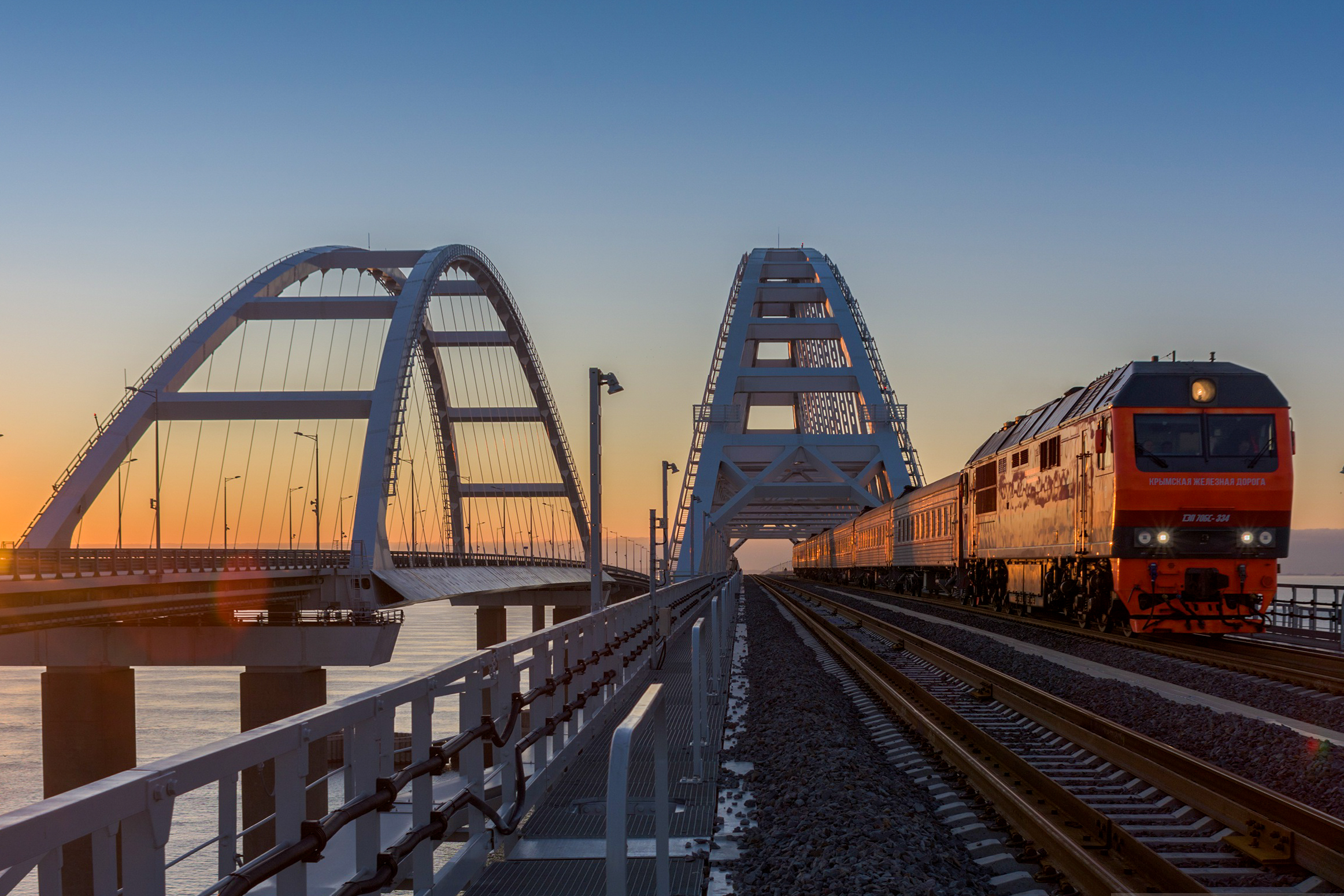
- Native name: Федеральное государственное унитарное предприятие «Крымская железная дорога»
- Type: Federal state unitary enterprise
- Industry: Rail transport
- Predecessor: Cisdnieper Railways (Ukrainian Railways)
- Founded: 26 March 2014; 12 years ago
- Headquarters: Simferopol, Ukraine (Occupied by Russia)
- Area served: Republic of Crimea, Sevastopol and Crimean Bridge
- Services: Passenger trains, Rail transport, Cargo
- Revenue: ₽ 2.1 billion (2017)
- Operating income: ₽ -5 billion (2017)
- Net income: ₽ 300 million (2017)
- Total assets: ₽ 10.6 billion (2017)
- Total equity: ₽ 8 billion (2017)
- Parent: Federal Agency for Rail Transport
- Website: www.crimearw.ru

The Crimea Railway (Note: Russian: Крымская железная дорога, romanized: Krymskaya zheleznaya doroga; Ukrainian: Кримська залізниця, romanized: Krymśka zaliznycia; Crimean Tatar: Къырым демирёлу, romanized: Qırım demirölü) is a state-owned railway company located in Crimea, both managing infrastructure and operating freight and passenger train services and has a near-monopoly on train travel in the Republic of Crimea and Sevastopol.

Crimea Railway is a unitary enterprise company independent of Russian Railways, and headquartered in Simferopol. It was founded in 2014 following the Russian annexation of Crimea from units of the Crimean Directorate of the Ukrainian Cisdnieper Railways.

== History ==
The territorial predecessor of Crimea Railway was the Crimean Directorate of Cisdnieper Railways, the regional operator Ukrainian Railways in Ukraine's Dnipropetrovsk Oblast, Zaporizhya Oblast, Kharkiv Oblast, Kherson Oblast and the Autonomous Republic of Crimea. On 26 March 2014, a month after the 2014 Russian annexation of Crimea, the Crimean authorities of the new Republic of Crimea established Crimea Railway as a publicly owned company (a unitary enterprise in Russia) and the city of Sevastopol. In Spring 2014, railway equipment was exported from Crimea to mainland Ukraine, including passenger locomotives, track machines and new cars. The parts of the Crimean Directorate in the Kherson Oblast and Zaporizhya Oblast of Ukraine were transferred to the Zaporizhia Directorate of Cisdnieper Railways. The seized trains of the reassigned railway were painted over, with the emblem of Ukraine and the logo of Ukrainian Railways replaced by the emblem of the Republic of Crimea and the abbreviation "CR", but the blue and yellow colors were preserved. On passenger cars, the code of registry was amended from 045,046 to 085.

In October 2014, inspectors conducted a survey of Crimea and concluded that the structures of rail tracks and turnouts were in poor condition. As a result, the maximum speed was reduced to 40 km/h, 25 km/h, and occasionally 10 km/h.

== Infrastructure ==
Map of the Crimea Railway as of 2020

The Crimea Railway has three locomotive depots at Simferopol, Dzhankoy, and Kerch; a carriage depot in Dzhankoy; two carriage depots with facilities for repairs; and one rail car depot in Simferopol. The Crimea Railway does not possess its own railway track machine for laying down new tracks. The Crimea passenger service traveled to Moscow, Saint Petersburg, Voronezh and Rostov-on-Don on an inter-modal scheme via a combination of train and ferry until the completion of the Crimean Bridge in 2019.

In November 2014, a railroad cargo ferry across the Kerch Strait reopened with three train ferries in operation: two for the route Caucasus-Crimea and one for Caucasus–Kerch.

=== Major stations ===
- Feodosia railway station
- Armyansk railway station
- Dzhankoy railway station
- Vladislavovka railway station
- Kerch railway station
- Port Krym railway station
- Simferopol railway station
- Yevpatoria railway station

=== Railway links with adjacent systems ===
- mainland Russia – same gauge 1,520 mm (4 ft 11 27/32 in), operational, connected to Russian Railways network
- mainland Ukraine – same gauge 1,520 mm (4 ft 11 27/32 in), disconnected since the outbreak of Russo-Ukrainian war
