= Iorgu =

Iorgu is a Romanian male given name and surname that may refer to:

- Iorgu Iordan
- Iorgu Toma
- Nicolae Iorgu
