= Romanian Volunteer Corps in Russia =

Military formation of World War I

- The Volunteer Corps colors, or "Darnița Flag", inscribed with the text TRĂIASCĂ ROMÂNIA MARE ("Long live Greater Romania")
- Active: March 8, 1917 – 1919
- Country: Romania
- Allegiance: Romanian Land Forces
- Size: Division (three regiments in 1918)
- Part of: 11th Division (attached to 2nd, 3rd Olt, 5th Chasseurs, 19th Caracal and 26th Rovine Regiments); Volunteer Corps' Command
- Garrison/HQ: Kiev (Darnytsia, Podil); Iași; Hârlău
- Engagements: World War I: Battle of Mărăști; Battle of Oituz; Battle of Mărășești

Commanders
- Notable commanders: Constantin Coandă; Marcel Olteanu

The Romanian Volunteer Corps in Russia (Romanian: Corpul Voluntarilor români din Rusia), or Volunteer Corps of Transylvanians-Bukovinians (Corpul Voluntarilor ardeleni-bucovineni, Corpul Voluntarilor transilvăneni și bucovineni), was a military formation of World War I, created from ethnic Romanian prisoners of war held by Russia. Officially established in February 1917, it comprised abjurers of the Austro-Hungarian Army, mainly contingents from Transylvania and Bukovina. These had been obliged to fight against Romania, and, once in Russian custody, volunteered for service against the Central Powers. As campaigners for self-determination and union with Romania, they passed political resolutions which, in both tone and scope, announced those adopted on Union Day 1918.

The Corps was effectively an active military reserve of the Romanian Land Forces, and regularly dispatched new units to the Romanian front after June 1917. It helped defend the last stretches of Romania against the Central Powers' unified offensive, and met success in the Battle of Mărășești, but it still lacked a unitary command structure. When the October Revolution in Russia and the Romanian armistice took Romania out of the Entente camp, the Corps was left without backing and purpose. However, it inspired the creation of similar units in Entente countries, most successfully the Romanian Volunteer Legion of Italy.

Mobilized volunteers or prisoners symbolically tied to the Corps were left behind in Russia after the Russian Civil War was ignited. Various such individuals formed the Romanian Legion of Siberia, which resisted the Bolsheviks in cooperation with the Czechoslovak Legions and the White movement. These units were ultimately repatriated to Greater Romania in 1920.

== Darnytsia Corps ==
=== Origins ===
During 1916, Romania entered World War I as an Entente country, in alliance with the Russian Empire against Austria-Hungary and the other Central Powers. After a while, Romania began investigating the fate and loyalties of Austria-Hungarian Romanians who were held in Russian POW camps. Estimates for that period place the total population of Bukovinian and Transylvanian Romanians in such facilities, throughout Russia, at 120,000 or 130,000. Meanwhile, in Romania itself there were several thousand Romanian refugees from Austria-Hungary who immediately signed up for service in the Romanian Armed Forces.

In Russia, Romanian captives complained about being worse off than prisoners of other Austro-Hungarian ethnicities, a matter which may have contributed to their decision of volunteering into Romanian service. Russian authorities were undecided about letting them join, and initially prohibited such initiatives; those who insisted to establish contact with Romania were arrested by the Russian police forces. During the same year, after consultations with Romania, the Russian executive reverted such policies. It was decided that Russia would free at most 15,000 of this demographic group, transferring them to Romania in exchange for a similar number of non-Romanian prisoners from Romanian camps.

Subsequently, those who chose to enlist were together relocated at the special camp in Darnytsia—a suburb of Kyiv, rendered in Romanian as Darnița. In December 1916, that facility held some 200 officers and 1,200 non-commissioned officers, who formed the nucleus (and general command) of a "Romanian Corps". Elected First Senior of the Camp, the 40-year-old Victor Deleu was a legal professional, rank-and-file member of the Romanian National Party (PNR) and journalist from Transylvania, who came to Darnytsia after internment in Kineshma. The other members of Darnytsia camp's leadership body were Pompiliu Nistor, Vasile Chiroiu, Emil Isopescu, Valeriu Milovan, Octavian Vasu and Ioan Vescan.

Regardless of such initiatives, Romania tended to give little attention to the potential of recruitment in Russia, as many decision-makers were still uncertain about the devotion of Transylvanians and Bukovinians, and worried that they might be welcoming Austro-Hungarian spies into army ranks. Additionally, probably half of the 120,000 men excluded themselves from the pool of recruits, as Austrian loyalists, invalids or men who had reason to fear Austria-Hungary's retaliation. Support from within Romania was therefore weak, and Russian obstruction still had a part to play, but in January the camp was visited by Lieutenant Colonel Constantin Gh. Pietraru of the Romanian Land Forces, on a mission to evaluate the recruitment project. The reversal of fortunes on the Romanian front had brought a Central Powers' invasion into southern Romania, and the Romanian military authority became pressured into finding new soldiers for the defensive action.

=== February Revolution ===
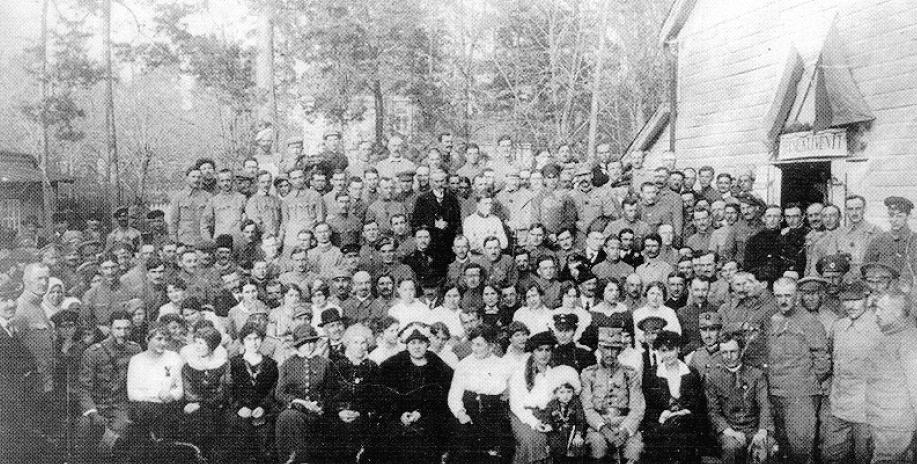
Romanian soldiers receiving visitors in Darnytsia, 1917

Shortly after these events, Russia experienced the February Revolution, which brought to power a liberal Russian Provisional Government. As a consequence of these, the whole transfer project was delayed, but the Russian acceptance of self-determination facilitated renewed political action. According to veteran Simion Gocan, the soldiers were inspired by both these revolutionary promises and the American entry into World War I, which seemingly made the Wilsonian Self-Determination an official Entente policy.

By Order 1191 of March 8 [O.S. February 23] 1917, Romania's Minister of War, Vintilă Brătianu, created the Volunteer Corps as a special formation of the national army. On the same day, in Darnytsia, Pietraru was tasked by Chief of Staff Constantin Prezan with equipping the new recruits and organizing them into units. The honorary command was assigned to Constantin Coandă, who was already the military attaché with Russia's Stavka (General Headquarters). Over the next month, in Mogilev, Coandă again negotiated the Corps' recognition by Stavka. Coandă received the permission, but the number of recruits was no longer clearly specified.

On March 18, Coandă issued a "Pledge" (Angajament), which regulated the status of Corps soldiers in relation to the Romanian Army, and which the recruits had to sign. It integrated the former Austro-Hungarian officers into the Romanian Army, with equivalent ranks, and equated their Austrian service, including time they spent in the POW camps, with active duty under Romanian banners. The pledge ended with the words: "May God help us, so that through our blood we may liberate our lands and create a Greater Romania, unified in substance and everlasting." All those who backed out after signing the document were to be considered deserters. Demand for enlistment remained considerable, even though rumor spread that Austro-Hungarian repression forces were by then murdering the families of volunteers and confiscating their property. However, Corps veteran Petru Nemoianu (Nemoian) was later to state that envy and class conflict were also characteristic for the formation, where the intellectual leaders quarreled over the better paid assignments.

In April, Pietraru met with the Provisional Government's Alexander Guchkov, and an agreement was reached regarding the maximum total of troops to be enlisted in the Romanian Corps. Answering to special pleas from Romanian Premier Ion I. C. Brătianu, Guchkov allowed for the recruitment of 30,000 prisoners in his custody. The order was revised by Alexander Kerensky, who reduced that number to 5,000 prisoners, noting that they were sorely needed as working hands in Russia's agriculture and industry. In practice, Quartermaster Ivan Romanovsky only allowed recruitment to take place in Moscow Military District, ordering that no more than 1,500 prisoners should be taken into account.

=== Darnytsia manifesto ===
By then, revolutionary examples also inspired the prisoners of Darnytsia to proclaim their own political goals, and openly demand the union of Transylvania with Romania. Their manifesto of April 26 [O.S. April 13] 1917, reviewed for publishing by the Transylvanian poet Octavian Goga, was signed by 250 officers and 250 soldiers, and is probably the first unionist statement to be issued by a Transylvanian representative body. The document states: "we Romanians, like all other subjugated nations, have grown aware that once and for all that we [...] cannot carry on with our lives within the frame of the Austro-Hungarian state; we [...] demand, with unwavering will, our incorporation into Romania, so that together we may form a single national Romanian state. [...] For the sake of this ideal, we throw in the balance all of what we have, our lives and fortunes, our women and children, our descendants' life and happiness. And we never will stop, lest we vanquish or perish."

The text, which also survives in slightly different versions, included a brief analysis of the international scene. It paid homage to Russia's democratic program, referenced the "generous" Wilsonian doctrine on self-determination, and looked forward to a congress of "blissful, national and democratic states". The manifesto made ample reference to the activity of "traitors" to the Transylvanian cause. As Nemoianu later recounted, there was a disguised reference to the PNR, whose moderate leaders, ostensibly loyal to the Austro-Hungarian monarchy, still tried to achieve Austrian devolution. More leniently, Gocan argued that the PNR at home was "deeply terrorized" and bound to government by a forcefully signed "declaration of loyalty".

Goga, a civilian refugee in transit through Russia, was supposed to have left Darnytsia with a copy of the appeal. Some argue that he did, and that the subsequent popularization is largely owed to his work as publicist. Such accounts are contradicted by the recollections of another unionist activist, Onisifor Ghibu: "[The appeal] was supposed to be handed down to Goga, on his stopover in Darnița. For whatever reason Goga stopped for a day in Kiev. In such circumstances I was the one designated to hold it". In this version, Ghibu passed it on to Romania's executive, King Ferdinand I and General Prezan.

In Russian and French translations, the document was distributed to various institutions: the Provisional Government, the Mossovet, the Petrograd Soviet and the Central Rada. It was also presented individually to representatives of Russian political life and to the foreign press agencies, and circulated among the national emancipation movements of Czechs, Poles, Serbs and "Ruthenians". A copy was later taken to the United States by Romania's special delegates Vasile Stoica, Vasile Lucaciu and Ioan Moța, and reprinted in the Romanian American community press. According to one account, it was also included in airborne leaflet propaganda dropped over the Austro-Hungarian trenches on the Italian front.

The Darnytsia soldiers soon gave themselves a special banner, based on the Romanian tricolor, with the added slogan Trăiască România Mare ("Long Live Greater Romania"). Seven such items were sewn in all, of which one was kept by Banat-born soldier Dimitrie Lăzărel (Lăzărescu).

=== Arrival in Iași ===
Six recruiting commissions were then dispatched from Romania to Russia. During May 1917, they received the Romanian volunteers, relocated from Darnytsia to the Girls' Lycée in Podil, where work also began on tailoring of the new Romanian uniforms. From Podil, a newly formed battalion was quickly sent into Romania to reinforce defense. Comprising some 1,300 men, this unit traveled by chartered train, stopping first in Kishinev (Chișinău). The largely Romanian-inhabited Russian city gave them a warm welcome: the battalion received another Romanian tricolor as war flag, and were presented with an Orthodox icon.

The battalion arrived in the city of Iași, Romania's provisional capital, where the volunteers were welcomed as heroes. On June 9, at Iași's marching ground, they took their oath and were officially integrated into the Land Forces. The ceremony was attended by King Ferdinand, Premier Brătianu, General Prezan, by representatives of Entente missions (Alexander Shcherbachov, Henri Mathias Berthelot) and by ambassadors of neutral countries. Manuel Multedo y Cortina of Spain recalled the sermon as "a solemn act", clamoring "the national aspiration" of Romanians.

At a later banquet and public rally in Union Square, Victor Deleu addressed the civilian population, describing the Corps' arrival as a rescue mission: "We had the duty of coming over here on this day, when you are living through such hardships. We left a foreign country, but did so with just one thought on our minds: coming home. That's why there was only road meant for us, the one leading us ahead. [...] We'll be the victors, for the Carpathians cannot reach as high as our hearts have been elevated!" As politician Ion G. Duca recalled, no other speech left as deep an impression on the public: "Deleu['s speech] was a pure and simple marvel, something unforgettable."

There was a noted effort on the part of Corps staff and other Transylvanian exiles (Ion Agârbiceanu, Laurian Gabor, Octavian Tăslăuanu etc.) to encourage the rapid integration of Podil-formed units into the Romanian line of defense. After a quick session of retraining, the Corps units were attached to the 11th Division, which was recovering in Iași. It was, however, decided that the formations, particularly those from Transylvania, were to be kept separated from the rest under the common command structure. An official act of 1918 explained the rationale behind this act: "Transylvanians should fight as Transylvanians [...] against the Hungarian state, so as to assert, clearly and beyond all doubt, that the Romanian nationals of the Hungarian state do not recognize its authority. To have fought against Hungary, however the war may end, ought to have been a badge of honor for the Romanian nation in Hungary and a moral reinforcement during the battles to come". When it was proposed that men from the Corps be assigned noms de guerre so as to avoid execution if captured, Deleu reacted strongly: "We intend to be the army of Transylvania! We aim to be the conscience of Transylvania, which is for absolute freedom and The Union! We do not want [to receive] a conquered land, we wish to liberate ourselves with our own forces! Hangings? Let them hang us! But let them be aware that Transylvania herself is fighting for liberty and The Union!"

=== During and after Mărășești ===
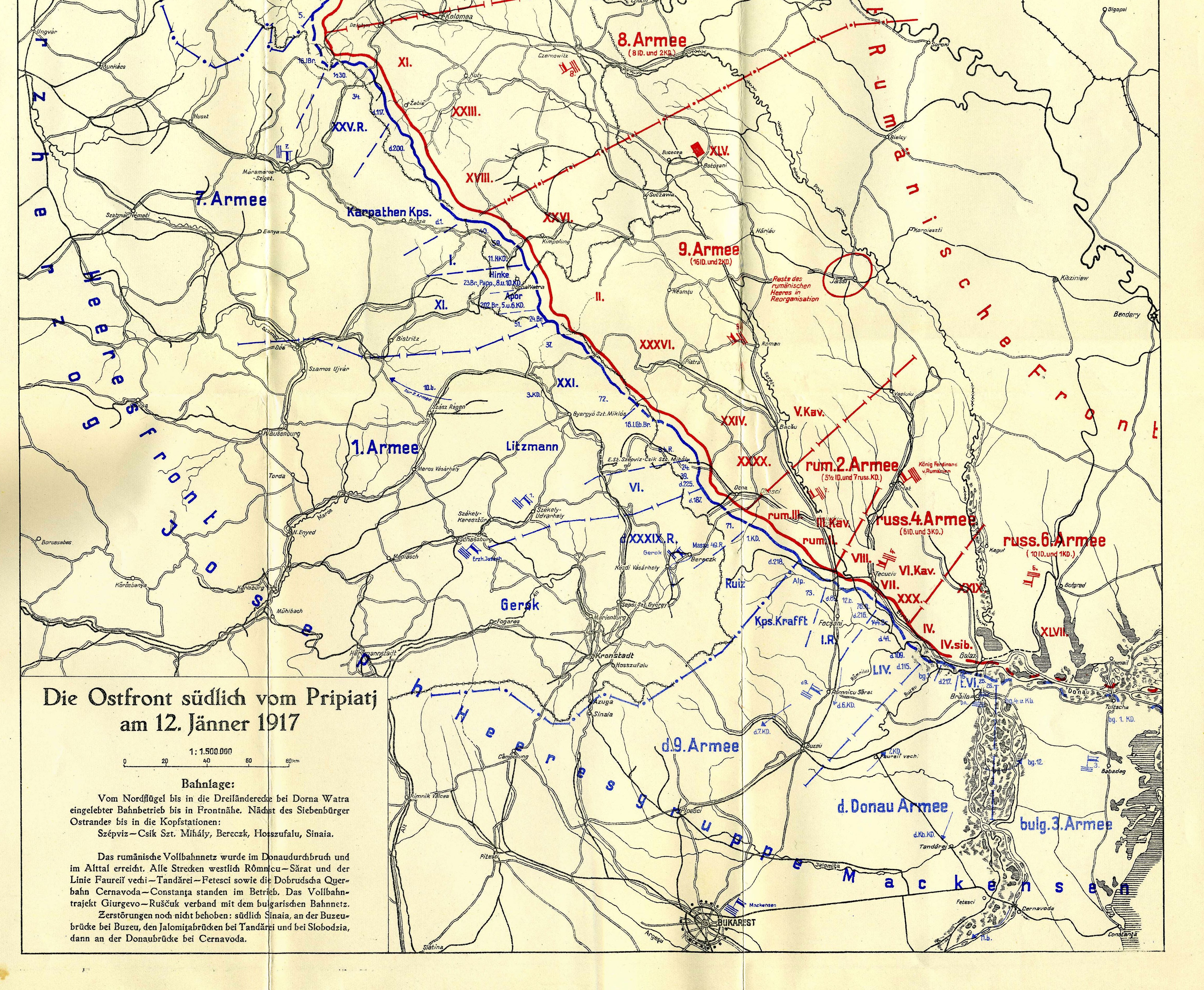
The Romanian front in January 1917

In July 1917, Corps offices in Kiev circulated the first issue of a recruitment gazette, România Mare ("Greater Romania"), which became the essential component of its propaganda effort in Russia. It was a new edition of the Bucharest gazette founded by Voicu Nițescu, and, in this new form, was managed by a team of pro-union activists: the Transylvanians Sever Bocu, Ghiță Popp, Iosif Șchiopu and the Bukovinian Filaret Doboș. România Mare was successful, despite the fact that only between 3,000 and 5,000 copies were published per issue.

Recruitment itself continued at a steady pace, and the Romanian General Staff created Biroul A. B ("T[ransylvania] and B[ukovina] Bureau") to keep evidence of Austro-Hungarian abjurers, on and behind the front. Its founding members were three Second Lieutenants: Deleu, Vasile Osvadă, Leonte Silion. Biroul A. B. was assisted by a Consultative Commission of intellectuals and politicians of Transylvanian or Bukovinian backgrounds (Goga, Ion Nistor, Leonte Moldovan) and represented in Russia itself by a deputation of Transylvanian officers—Elie Bufnea, Victor Cădere.

Units of the Volunteer Corps earned distinction in the defense of eastern Romania, which postponed the Central Powers' advance during summer 1917. With the 11th Division, the Transylvanians-Bukovinians participated in the battles of Mărăști, Oituz and Mărășești. At the time, they were split between five regiments of the 11th Division: 2nd, 3rd Olt, 5th Chasseurs, 19th Caracal, 26th Rovine.

The three battles to hold back the Central Powers ended in early autumn 1917, by which time there were 31 dead and 453 wounded among the volunteers; 129 received distinction. Dimitrie Lăzărel was one to have survived all three engagements, and legend has it that he never went into combat without the banner. Deleu had left reserve duty to join the 10th Chasseurs Battalion in the Mărășești combat, but fell severely ill and was reassigned to other offices.

The divisive command structure was a disappointment for the Transylvanian and Bukovinian volunteers. In a complaint they sent to King Ferdinand during September, they requested reintegration into a special Corps, arguing: "Through such legions the free will of the formerly oppressed citizens would be expressing a common will. One would not be enrolling isolated individuals [...], but an entire people free from the [Austrian] yoke." Like his army staff, the monarch disapproved of this initiative, informing Deleanu and Tăslăuanu that, at most, units overseen by Biroul A. B. could expect to form special regiments within the existing divisions. Parallel negotiations continued between Russia and Romania over the total number of volunteers allowed to leave Russian soil. During early June, Stavka approved the release of 5,000 Romanian Austro-Hungarian prisoners, all of them from the Moscow Governorate. According to historian Ioan I. Șerban, the approval was creating problems for the Romanian side: of the soldiers in question, the majority were held deep inside Russia, and employed "in the agricultural regions and the various industrial centers of southern Russia, the Ural, western Siberia etc." As the Mărășești battle was waging, the Romanian government called on the Russian leadership to allow yet more recruits to be sent to the front, and received a confirmation of Guchkov's earlier 30,000 directly from Chief of Staff Lavr Kornilov. As a result, two of the recruiting commissions relocated to the Pacific port of Vladivostok, and set in motion a plan for recruiting more volunteers throughout Asiatic Russia.

After Kornilov's promise, the Romanian high command took measures of creating a single and distinct division, comprising both those who had passed through Podil and those refugees already in Romanian service. Biroul A. B. was replaced by a Central Service, answering to General Staff. In early December 1917, the Corps was reformed a final time, as a division-sized formation. Colonel Marcel Olteanu was placed in charge of the central Volunteer Corps' Command, based in Hârlău. By the early days of 1918, it had three new regiments under its command: 1st Turda (commander: Dragu Buricescu), 2nd Alba Iulia (Constantin Pașalega), 3rd Avram Iancu.

Reenlisted prisoners of war formed a large section of the approximately 30,800 former Austria-Hungarian citizens who were registered as active on the Romanian side by late 1917. By the time it stopped recruiting (January 1918), the Corps had enlisted some 8,500 to 10,000 men. However, the Kornilov order came too late in the war for there to have been a more significant Transylvanian-Bukovinian contribution to the Romanian effort.

=== October Revolution and Romanian truce ===
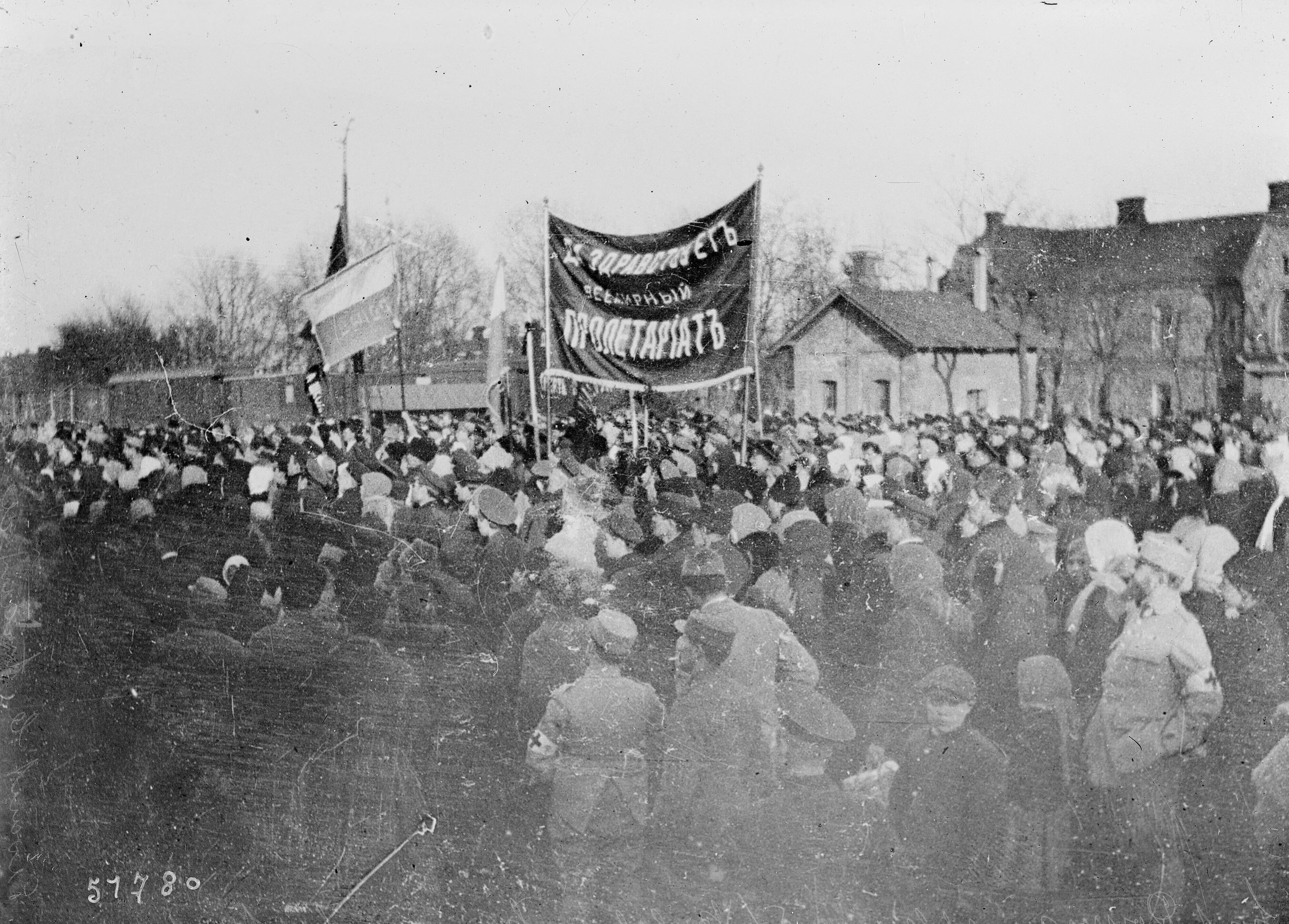
Bolshevik rally at a train station in either Romania or Bessarabia (1917). Romanian soldiers watching from the side

The October Revolution shook Russia and placed most of it under a Bolshevik government which had no intention of continuing with war against the Central Powers. Although the Romanian presence in Kiev was set back by the November Uprising and the January Rebellion, then dispersed by the anti-Entente Skoropadsky regime, Constantin Gh. Pietraru and a small force remained behind in the new Ukrainian People's Republic (UNR), where they signed up the last group of Romanian volunteers. Some of these efforts were hampered by a diplomatic tensions between the UNR and Romania. Ukrainian officials refused to either rally with the Entente or negotiate border treaties with Romania, but tacitly permitted Deleu, Bocu, Ghibu and other Transylvanian Romanians activists who worked against Austria-Hungary to work on UNR territory.

România Mare gazette, which still had Bocu as chief editorial manager, closed down in December 1917, having published 23 issues in all. By then, Ion Agârbiceanu and family had left their temporary home in Yelisavetgrad for Hârlău, where he became the Corps' chaplain.

A last group of Romanian units left the UNR and headed for Kishinev, where a Romanian-friendly Moldavian Democratic Republic was vying for power with the local Bolsheviks. Their action was likely coordinated with the Romanian High Command, which at the time had begun an attack against the western Bessarabian town of Ungheni. The volunteers had dressed as Russian soldiers during their passage to Iași, but were recognized as Romanian units by the Moldavian and Bolshevik troops garrisoned in Kishinev City Station, where their train stopped on January 6. A skirmish followed, with the Moldavians and Bolsheviks either disarming, or killing or kidnapping Corps soldiers. The survivors were held captive in the same place as Moldavian Army founder Gherman Pântea, and were released later that day, allegedly by Republican troops. Years later, suspicion arose that Pântea had in fact helped the Bolsheviks, as an alleged enemy of Romanian interests in Bessarabia.

Romania's own peace treaty with the Central Powers put the recruitment project on a complete standstill, and diminished the effort to move Transylvanian-Bukovinian soldiers into the single new force. According to his own account, Sever Bocu attempted to quickly dispatch Hârlău troops to the Western Front, but his project vetoed by the Romanian commander in chief Alexandru Averescu.

As Romania faced indecision about its future, the Corps was still the subject of unionist propaganda, spread by Romanian intellectuals in the capitals of Entente nations. From his temporary home in France, Bocu reestablished România Mare as the tribune of Romanian diaspora politics and unionist aspirations. He was joined there by Octavian Goga, who had crossed over Bolshevik territory and Finland with false papers, claiming to be a Volunteer Corps veteran.

== Legacy ==
=== Diaspora units and the cut-off troops ===
By spring 1918, Transylvanian-Bukovinian prisoners held in France and Italy proceeded to form their own abjurers' units, based upon the existing Romanian Corps. Luciano (Lucian) Ferigo became Commander of the newly formed Romanian Legion in Italy (Legione Romena d'Italia) which took its ceremonial flag from the Regio Esercito on July 28 and contributed the Austrians' defeat at Vittorio Veneto. On the Western Front, a similar formation was being created, mainly by Romanian citizens who resented their country for surrendering, but also by soldiers who clandestinely left Romania to continue the fight. Its Transylvanian-Bukovinian membership was small, reflecting the number of Austro-Hungarian prisoners in France, who had been taken mainly in the Serbian and Macedonian operations. The 135 who signed up in October 1918 were put off by the refusal of French officials to recognize their Austro-Hungarian officer's ranks. Their unit was attached to the French Foreign Legion, to be joined by the various other categories of Romanian recruits, but the effort was stopped midway; in November, the Entente's victory over Germany ended World War I for both France and Romania.

As the dissolution of Austria-Hungary was taking effect in October 1918, other such units were spontaneously formed on Austrian territory, mainly from rogue components of the Imperial Army. The Romanian Legion of Prague helped the Czechoslovak National Council and the Sokols gain the upper hand during an anti-Austrian uprising, while other Romanian units were breaking away from Austrian command in Vienna. Romanians also formed a distinct segment of the k.u.k. Kriegsmarine personnel who rioted on the Austrian Littoral and elsewhere in the Adriatic.

A more complex situation reigned in Russia. As early as April 1918, some Romanian volunteer groups joined up with the Bolshevik Red Army, taking their orders from Commissar Béla Kun, but some of their members continued to serve the nationalist cause. In June 1918, a number of Romanian prisoners who had signed up for the Volunteer Corps were cut off from Romania by the Russian Civil War and left to fend for themselves. Some crossed into Bolshevik Russia hoping to be repatriated together with the Romanian consulate, while others took to areas controlled by the White movement, reaching Irkutsk; still others escaped through northern routes into Sweden. The various groups were monitored by French public opinion, and plans were drafted to merge them into the Romanian Legion on the Western Front, or even to have them open up a new Eastern Front.

Meanwhile, in tandem with larger Serb and Czech national units, Romanian prisoners on the Trans-Siberian Railway were involved in creating new armed formations. Their original goal was to show to the Entente that Romanians were still eager to fight against the Central Powers, but the Romanians also defended the line in skirmishes with the Bolshevik or anarchist cells. They resisted especially when the Bolshevik Russian government asked them to surrender all weapons.

=== "Horia" Regiment and Romanian Legion of Siberia ===
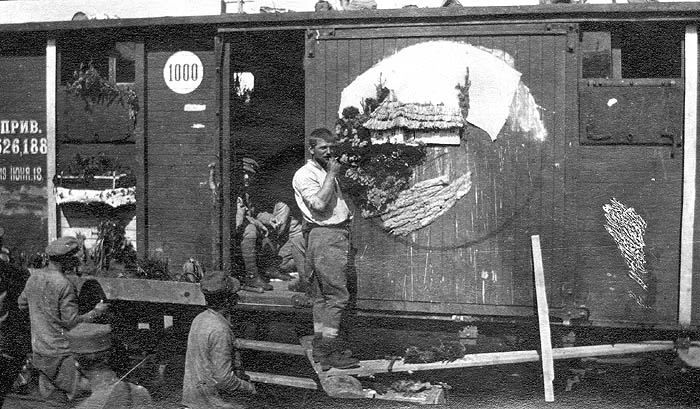
Railroad car used as quarters by the Czechoslovak Legion in Russia

Some prisoners or drifting units in Russia joined up with new arrivals from Kiev. They created the 1,300-strong battalion of Kinel, which was effectively a subunit of the Czechoslovak Legions. Romanian officers' clubs were organizing themselves in lands held by the Komuch Democrats and the White Russian Siberian Autonomy. The original force to emerge from such schemes was formed at Samara by Valeriu Milovan. Criticized for his eccentric idea of imitating egalitarian Bolshevik practices and doing away with military ranks, he also sparked a conflict when he arrested the more conservative officer Voicu Nițescu. Nițescu escaped imprisonment and fled to Chelyabinsk, but support for his cause continued to be eroded by the privates' growing support for the Bolsheviks. As a result of Nițescu's activity, supported by Gocan and Nicolae Nedelcu, Dr. iur., Romanian loyalists in Chelyabinsk created a "Horia" Battalion (or Regiment). Major Ioan Dâmbu was assigned to lead it, and, under Czechoslovak orders, the new Mărășești and Reserve battalions were sent on mission to other localities.

At the time, the two recruiting commissions in Vladivostok were also reactivated by the arrival of an international anti-Bolshevik force. Their propaganda leaflets, drafted by Bukovinian Iorgu G. Toma, reached all 40 POW camps in the region, urging any volunteer to make his own way to Chelyabinsk. That city emerged as a main site of Romanian political and military activity, with a reported population of 3,000 liberated Romanians (July 1918). Major Dâmbu put a momentary stop to Bolshevik influence by arresting Milovan and ordering the Samaran unit to Chelyabinsk. A complex set of sanctions were imposed, in the hope of curbing dissent, ranks were reintroduced, uniforms on the Romanian Land Forces model were distributed around, and a patriotic cultural section began to function.

Taking a long and perilous journey, Elie Bufnea and some other officers of the original Darnytsia Corps joined up with "Horia" in mid autumn, at a moment when the Romanian soldiers were celebrating the breakup of Austria-Hungary. The union between "Horia" and various new arrivals from the western Siberian camps became a second Volunteer Corps, grouping as many as 5,000 volunteers. Through the alliance it formed with the anti-Bolshevik Czechoslovak Legions, it was a Romanian national contribution to the international coalition, but reluctantly so. Once relocated to Irkutsk and Omsk in late 1918, the volunteers expressed their lack of interest in fighting against the Bolsheviks: after rebelling against Colonel Kadlec, their Czech technical adviser, the Corps was placed under Maurice Janin of the French Mission.

A Romanian Legion of Siberia was formed from this structure, but only 3,000 soldiers still volunteered in its ranks—2,000 others were progressively transferred out of the combat zone, shipped out to Romania or taken back to prisoner of war camps. As Șerban notes, the Western Front victory had opened the way for Transylvania's union, and "their only thought was to regain, as fast as possible, their families and their places of origin". A special case was that of Bolshevik sympathizers: in October, Dâmbu was killed by his own soldiers, partly in retaliation for Milovan's arrest.

The combative Legion defended the Trans-Siberian between Tayshet and Nizhneudinsk, where they forced the Bolsheviks into a truce and established their reputation for brutality with the nickname Dikaya Divizia (Дикая Дивизия, "Wild Division"). The anti-Bolshevik formation and the Romanian non-combatants were eventually retrieved from the Russian Far East upon the end of foreign intervention, and were fully repatriated with the other Romanians from May 1920. Milovan, court-martialled by the Legion, was cleared of the charges by a higher authority; however, those who killed Dâmbu were sentenced as mutineers and assassins.

=== Late echoes ===
The original Volunteers' Corps went out of service in December 1918, soon after German defeat and Transylvania's de facto union. The Romanian volunteers' rally in support of self-determination was judged by some Romanian authors as a direct predecessor of Alba Iulia's "Great National Assembly", whereby union was being endorsed on Wilsonian principles. They call the Corps' April 26 meeting a "1st Alba Iulia". Within Transylvania itself, opinion was more divided. Shortly before the Hungarian–Romanian War erupted, members of Corps were required to present themselves for reenlistment. The old rivals from within the Romanian National Party, who led the Directory Council of Transylvania after 1918, allegedly refused to welcome the Corps back as a single unit, and plans for its mobilization had to be dropped. A new "Horia" Volunteer Corps was reportedly formed on the Crișul Alb River, as a first line of defense against the Hungarian Soviet Republic.

In 1923, the old Corps set up a veterans' association, the Union of Volunteers, which carried the reputation of being a fascist-inspired section of the PNR. Petru Nemoianu strongly dismissed the accounts as "enormities", and stated that the Union had good cause to reject the PNR for its handling of the Transylvanian issue. More sympathetic to the PNR, Simion Gocan was President of the Union in Bihor County, and complained about tensions with Nemoianu. The Union even ran for Transylvanian seats in Parliament during the 1931 general election. It formed an electoral cartel with Nicolae Iorga's Democratic Nationalist Party and against PNR's successors (the National Peasants' Party), but was only assigned non-eligible positions on the electoral lists.

All praise for the Corps' contributions was toned down between 1948 and 1989, when Romania was a communist state. According to Șerban, communist historiography presented the story "superficially, usually truncated or in the context of other events". During the first wave of communization, repression touched several figures once associated with the Corps: Bufnea, Sever Bocu (beaten to death in Sighet prison), Ghiță Popp.

Interest in the Volunteer Corps' activity was only revived after the Romanian Revolution of 1989. Among the relics left behind by the Corps is Dimitrie Lăzărel's banner, probably the only one of seven to have survived. In 1923, Lăzărel paraded it at the Volunteers' Union reunion in Arad. Referred to as the Darnița Banner, it was donated to a local church, then exhibited by the Museum of Banat, Timișoara. The Kishinev flag was donated by the Corps to ASTRA National Museum Complex of Sibiu.
