= Revaca railway station =

Railway station in Moldova

Revaca
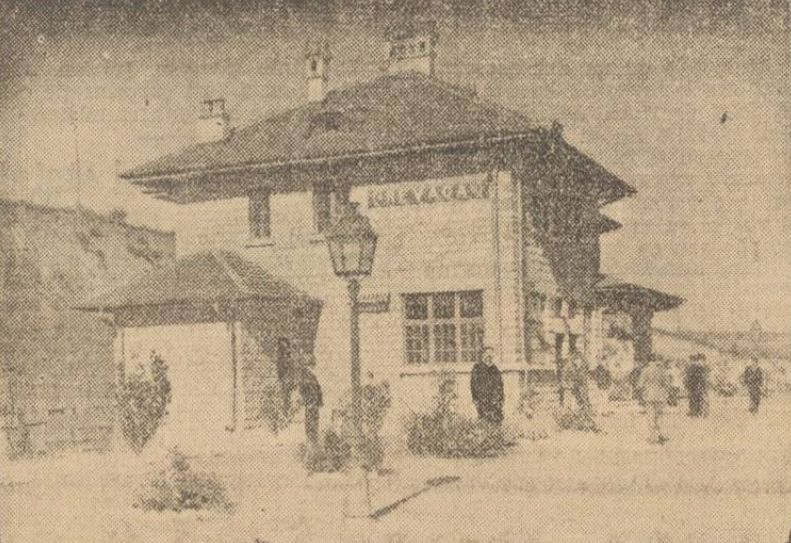
- Revaca train station as featured in Dimineața newspaper from November 13, 1933 (No. 9655).

General information
- Location: Moldova
- Coordinates: 46°56′58″N 28°55′57″E
- Owner: Calea Ferată din Moldova
- Connections: Connection shuttle to Airport

Construction
- Parking: Available

Other information
- Status: Functioning
- Station code: 391002

History
- Electrified: Yes

Services
Preceding station	Ukrainian Railways	Following station
Terminus	351/352	Chișinău toward Kyiv-Pasazhyrskyi
Location
- Location within Moldova

Revaca is a railway station in Moldova. It is located near Chișinău International Airport.

Starting in 2026, the station began to receive a daily train from Kyiv. The train is met by a free shuttle bus to connect travelers to the airport and give access to air transport for Ukrainians affected by the closed airspace due to the ongoing war.
