= Iorgu Toma =

Austro Hungarian-Romania journalist and politician

Iorgu G. Toma (January 16, 1871–January 13, 1935) was an Austro-Hungarian-born Romanian journalist, translator and politician.

Born in Vama, just east of Câmpulung Moldovenesc in the Duchy of Bukovina, his parents were Gavril and Ana (née Lupașcu). From 1882 to 1891, he attended the Greek-Orthodox Gymnasium in Suceava. In 1896, he graduated from the law faculty of Czernowitz University. After an apprenticeship in Suceava, he served as a judge in Rădăuți (1899-1906). He became secretary of the Suceava tribunal in 1906. He entered the Romanian National Party of Bukovina (1905) and the Christian Social Party of Bukovina (1908). He fled to the Romanian Old Kingdom during World War I, helping found Revista Bucovinei in Bucharest in 1916. The Romanian government sent him as a volunteer officer to Russia in 1917, in order to bring back imprisoned Romanian soldiers from Transylvania and Bukovina, the Romanian Volunteer Corps in Russia. As a result of the Russian Revolution, he retreated to Siberia, whence he managed to reach Romania.

Returning after an absence of four years to Bukovina, now part of Greater Romania, Toma served as general secretary of its local government (1919-1920). An active member of the Democratic Union Party, he was elected to the first parliament of the enlarged state (1919-1920). He served as both deputy and senator during the National Liberal governments of 1922-1926 and 1927–1928, and was vice president of the Assembly of Deputies. He was an adviser at the Cernăuți appeals court, established in July 1919. From 1922 to 1926, he was state secretary with ministerial rank, and headed the regional committee for liquidation and unification.

Toma wrote unsuccessful verses. He translated works by Friedrich Schiller, Johann Wolfgang von Goethe and Nikolaus Lenau. His contributions appeared in Junimea literară, Glasul Bucovinei, Apărarea națională, Viața Românească, Neamul românesc literar, Patria and Încercări literare. His pen names were Delavamă, Un membru al partidei naționale and Naratur Identique. He was involved in various societies, including Societatea Academică Junimea, the Romanian Club of Rădăuți (founding member, 1900) and the Romanian School Society of Suceava (president after the death of Simeon Florea Marian). He promoted tourism in the area around Câmpulung Moldovenesc, where he died. He was awarded the Order of the Crown of Romania.
