= Chișinău railway station =

Railway station in Chișinău, Moldova

Coordinates: 47°00′45″N 28°51′35″E

Chișinău railway station Gara feroviară din Chișinău
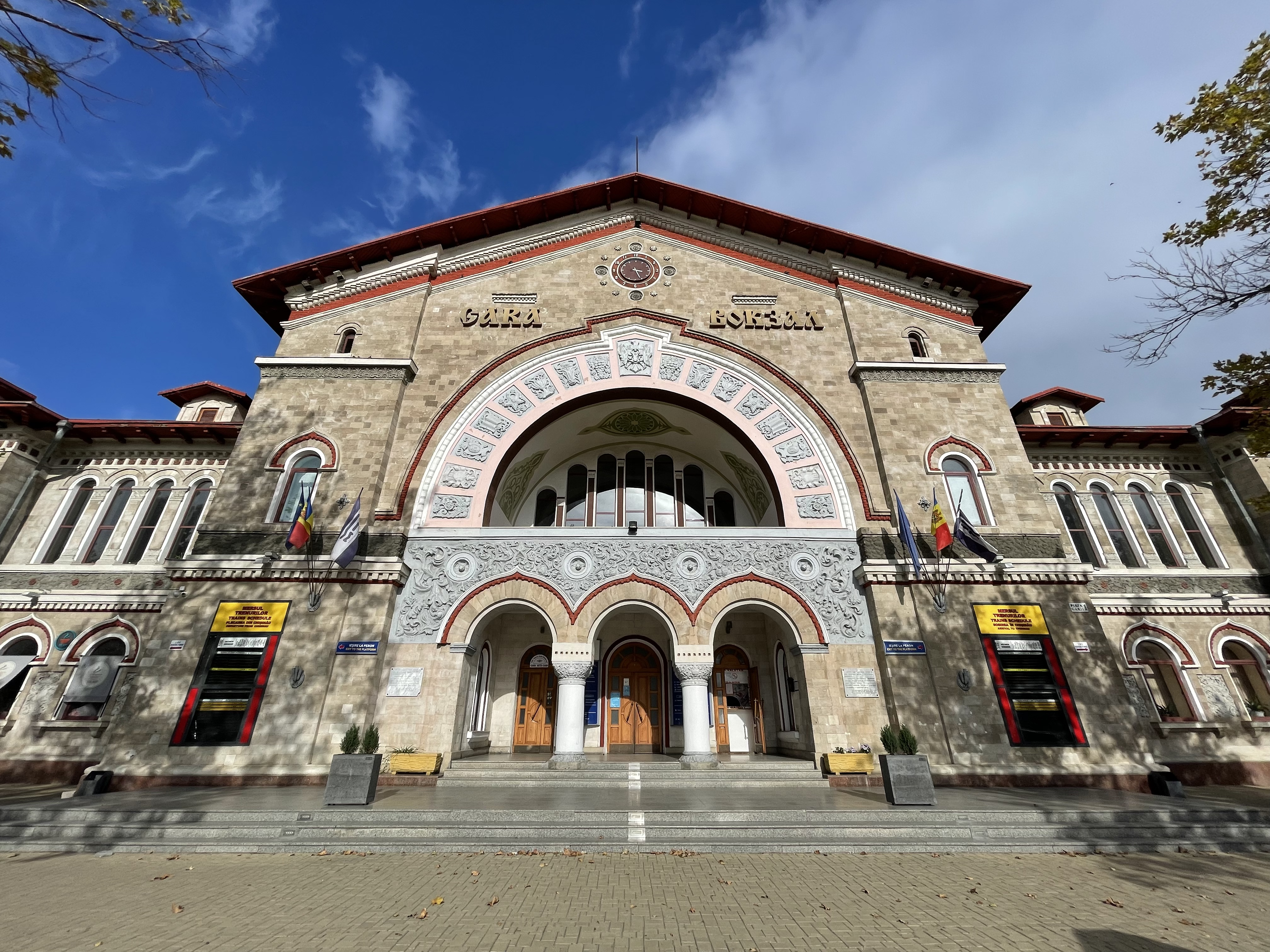

General information
- Location: Moldova, Chișinău
- Owner: Calea Ferată din Moldova
- Platforms: 3
- Tracks: 8

Construction
- Parking: Yes

Other information
- Station code: 391207

History
- Opened: 1871

Services
| Preceding station | CFR | Following station |
|---|---|---|
| Ungheni towards București Nord | Prietenia | Terminus |
| Preceding station | Ukrainian Railways | Following station |
| Revaca Terminus | 351/352 | Bălți Oraș toward Kyiv-Pasazhyrskyi |
Location
- Location within Moldova

Chișinău railway station (Romanian: Gara feroviară din Chișinău) is the main railway station serving Chișinău, Moldova. It is located at 1 Aleea Garii, not far from the centre of the city.

== History ==
The Railway Station, or the Old Railway Station in Chișinău, was designed between 1880 and 1890 by Heinrich von Lonsky, with the construction led by architect Alexandru Bernadazzi, in the context of the development of the railway network in the Russian Empire. The first railway line connecting Chișinău with Tiraspol was inaugurated in 1871, marking the beginning of rail transport in Bessarabia. The station was designed to support economic development and the transportation of agricultural goods from the region to markets in Eastern Europe and Russia. The station was destroyed during World War II, subjected to bombings in 1941 and 1944. It was redesigned, and the current station no longer resembles the old one.

In 1918, the railway was heavily used by members of the Sfatul Țării, particularly for connections to Iași, where the Romanian Government and the Royal House had been evacuated from Bucharest following the German occupation. It was also used by members of the first Bessarabian parliament who were mobilized in the Russian army and fought on the Romanian front.

On January 6, 1918, the Bolshevik Front Section arrested a detachment of soldiers from Transylvania at the Chișinău station, who, according to a preliminary agreement, had arrived from Kiev under the orders of the Sfatul Țării. After a confrontation, several Transylvanian soldiers were killed. On March 26, 1918, the Prime Minister of Romania, Alexandru Marghiloman, arrived in Chișinău, accompanied by the Minister of War, Constantin Hârjeu, and other officials. The Romanian Prime Minister held talks with members of the Bessarabian government, representatives of factions in the Sfatul Țării, clerics, large landowners, and other social groups to understand their stance on the union of Bessarabia with Romania.

During the interwar period, under Romanian administration, the station was modernized, and the railway infrastructure expanded. Following the Second World War, the station was rebuilt in a Stalinist style with some original architectural elements being preserved. The reconstruction was completed in the 1950s, and the building became a symbol of the city.

The construction of the Chișinău Railway Station was driven by the need to develop transport infrastructure in Bessarabia, enabling faster and more efficient connections to the Black Sea ports and markets in Eastern Europe.

== Services ==
By April 2026, principally only international trains service Chişinău station. A daily service to Bucharest exists as well as daily service connecting to Kyiv. After a April 2026 test run, Ukrainian Railways Train 351/352 now continues on to Revaca near the Chișinău Airport, where it is met by a shuttle bus to the terminal to give Ukrainians access to air transport while their country's airspace remains closed due to the war. All other trains have been suspended. There are no regional trains as of April 2026, all trains to Transnistria (Tiraspol and Bender) have been suspended as well.

In the past, international services operated from Chișinău to Kyiv, Moscow (all daily), Minsk (Tuesday, Friday, and Sunday), and Warsaw (Monday, Wednesday, and Friday). Daily trains also ran to Saint Petersburg and Odesa. There have been several trains each week to Iași in Romania, and daily services to Tiraspol.

The station is equipped as an international port of entry/exit, with a customs hall, and border control. International services arrive at and depart from platform 1, whose concourse can be closed off with barriers to create a contained customs zone.

== Image Gallery ==
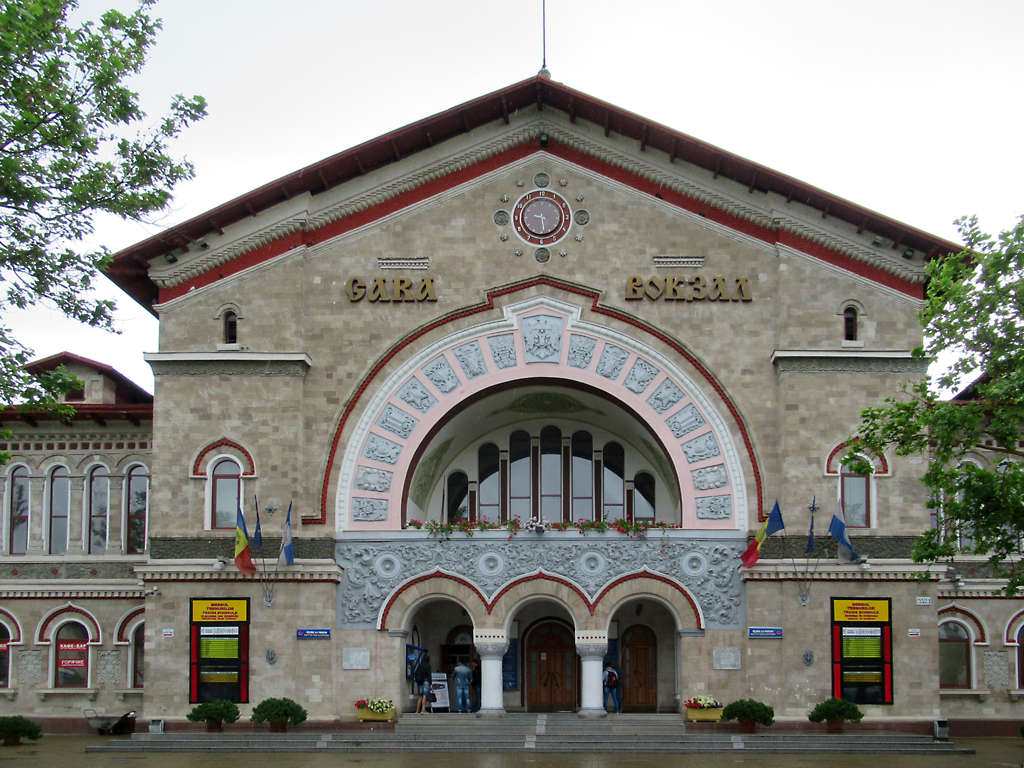
The Main Entrance

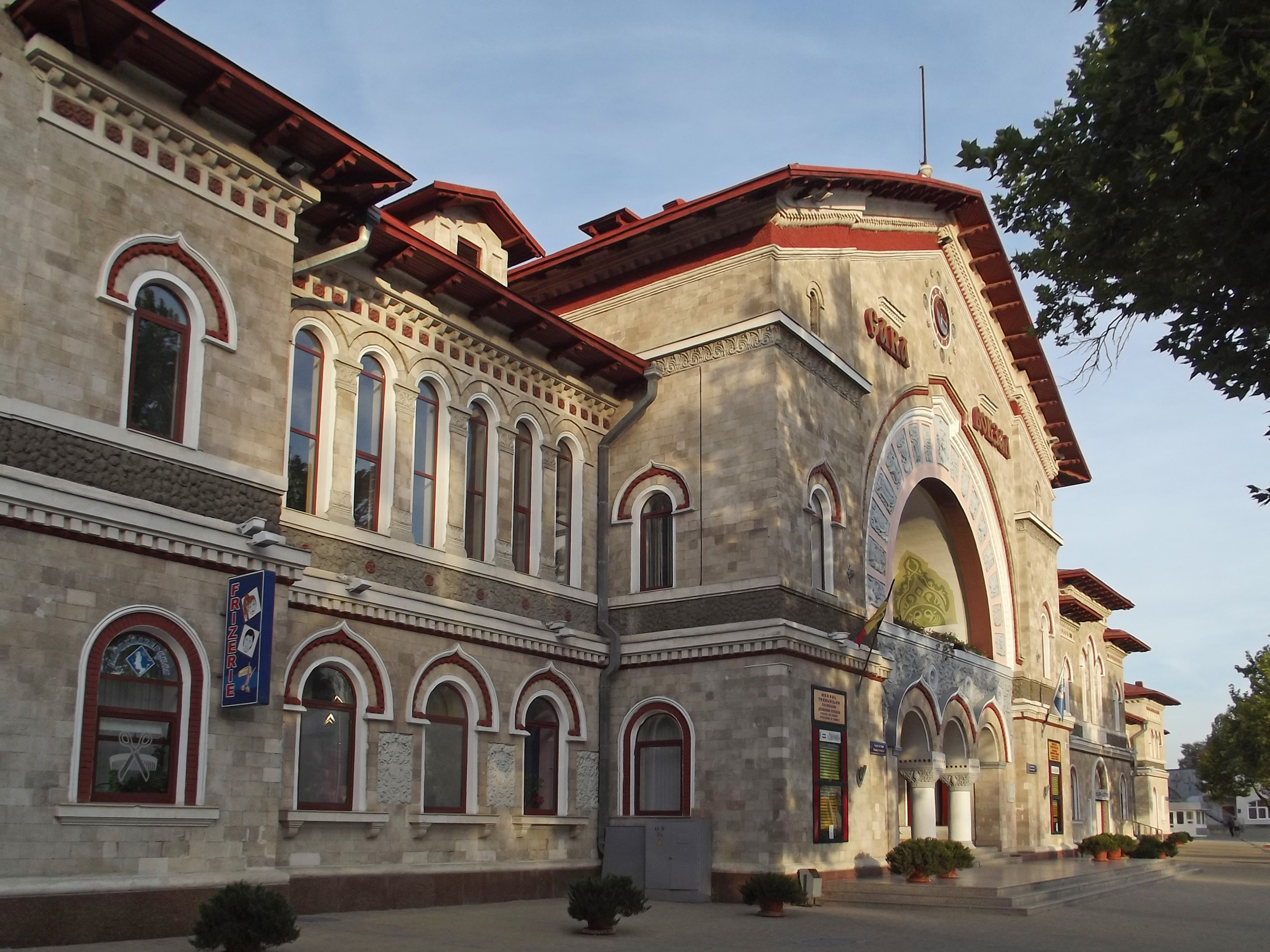

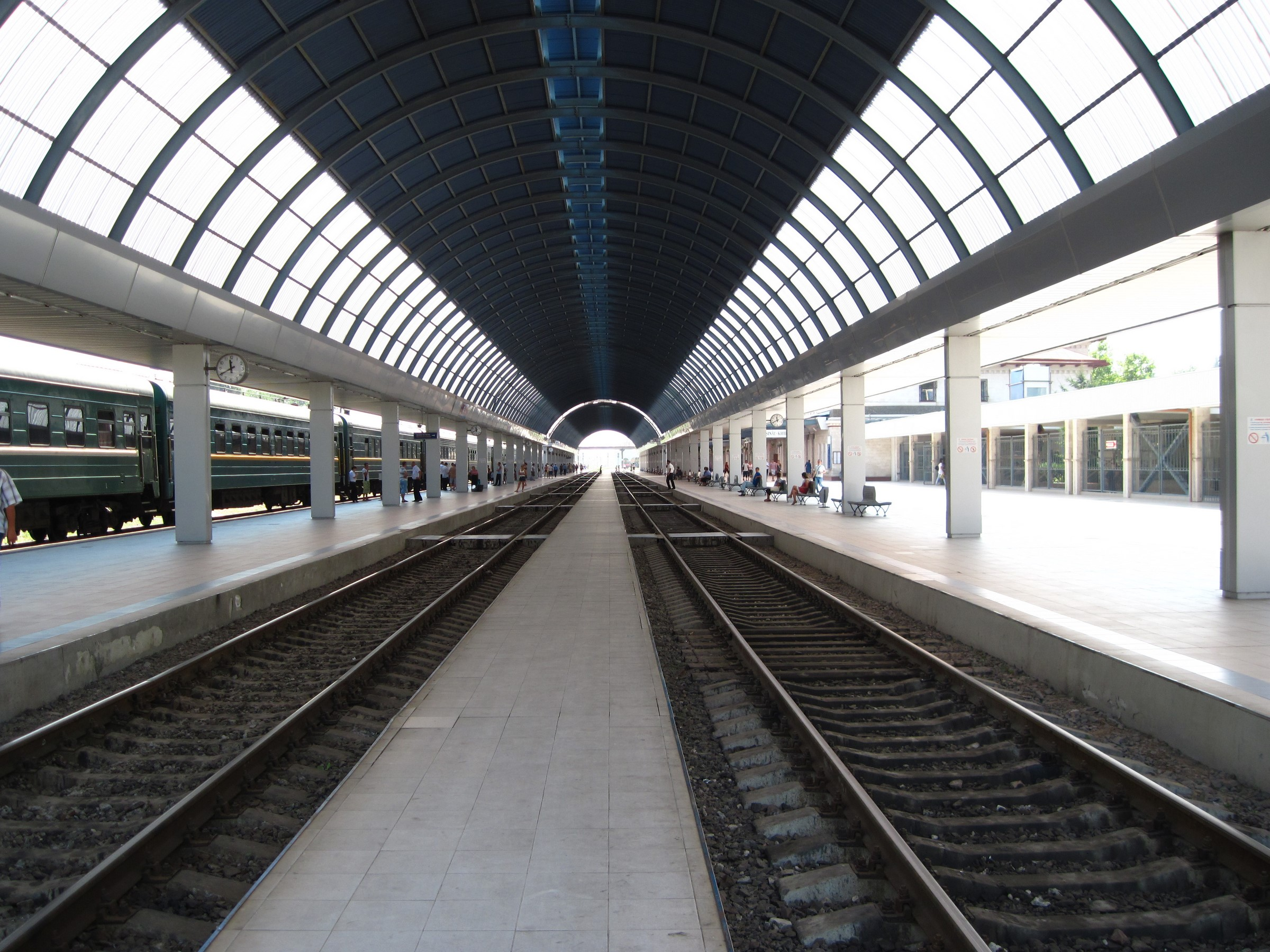
Inside Rails

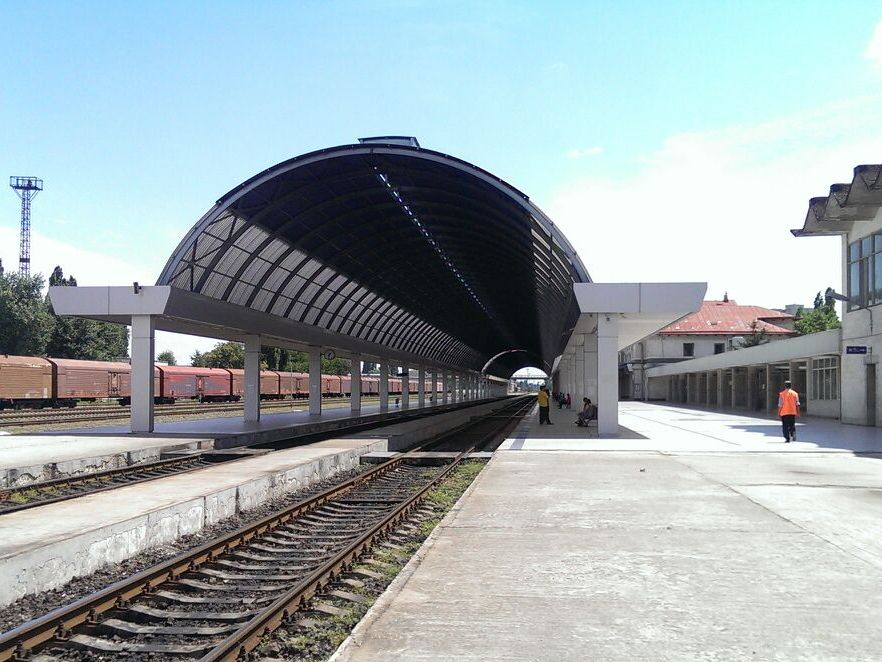

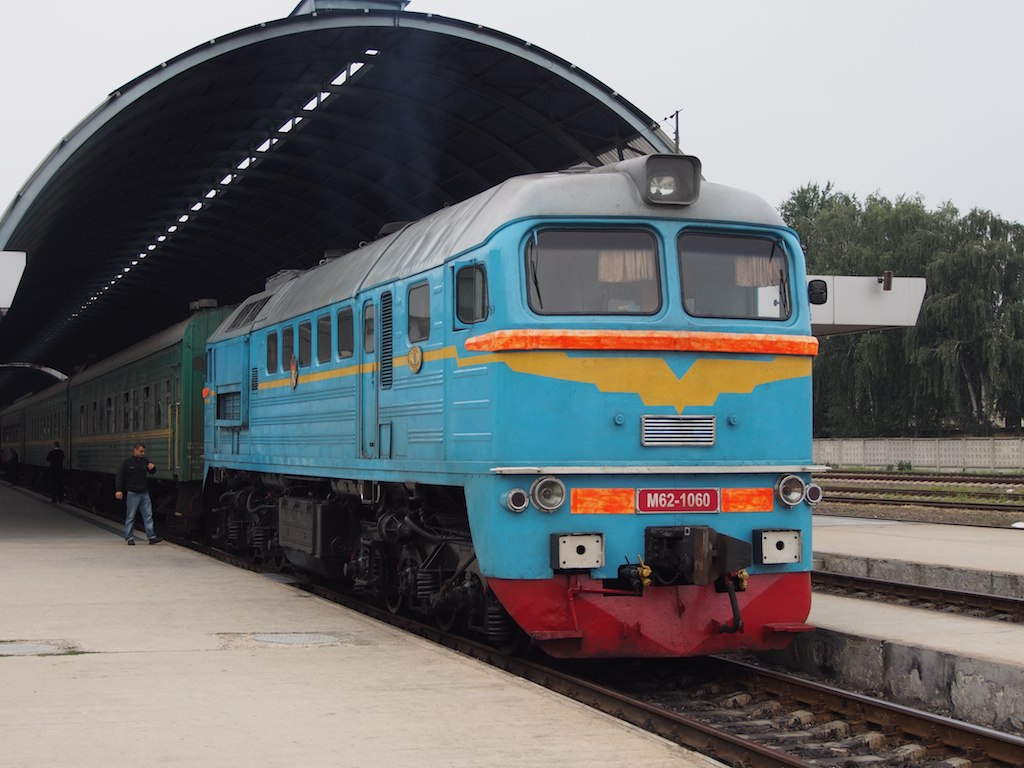

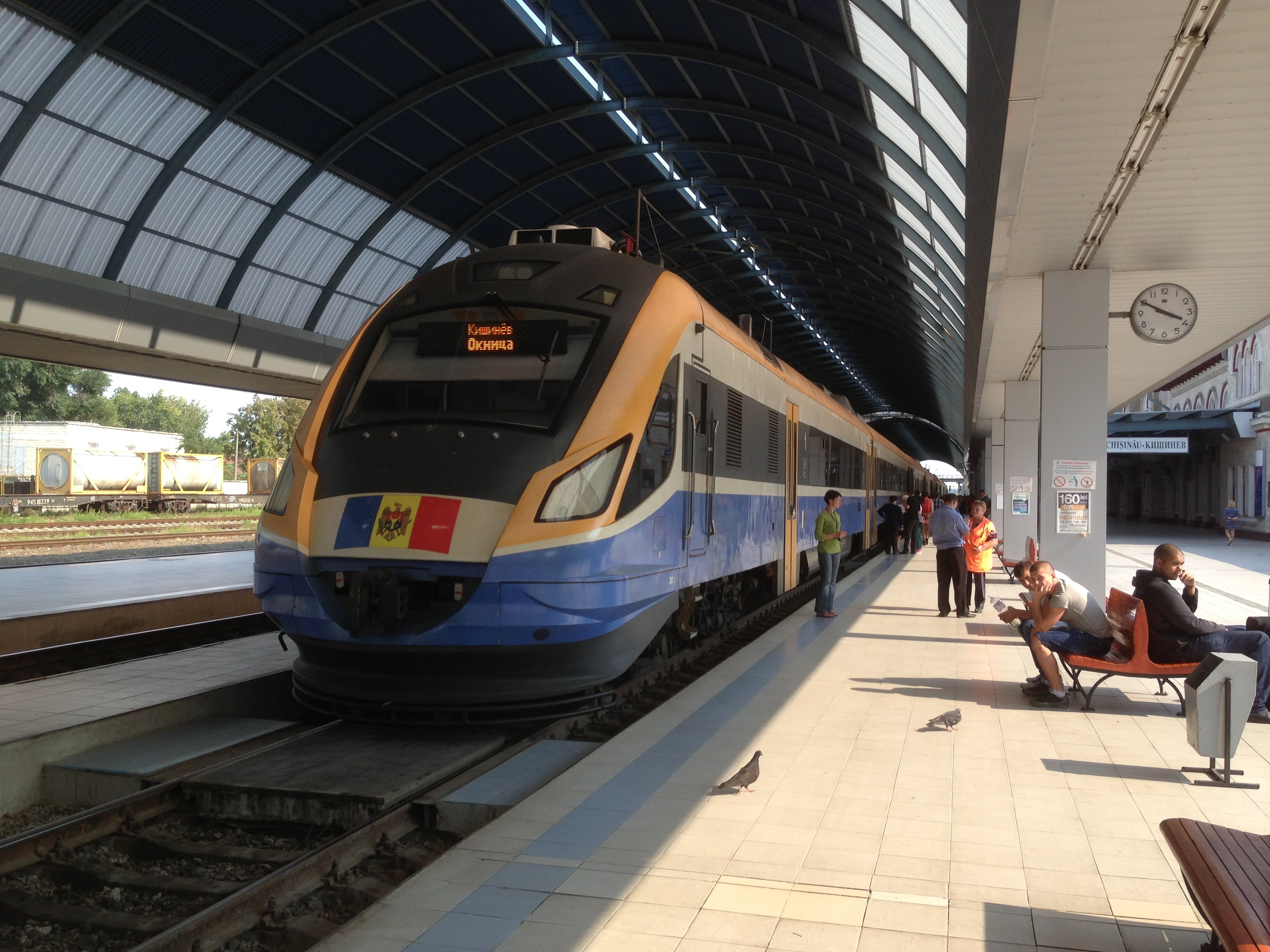
Locomotives in use

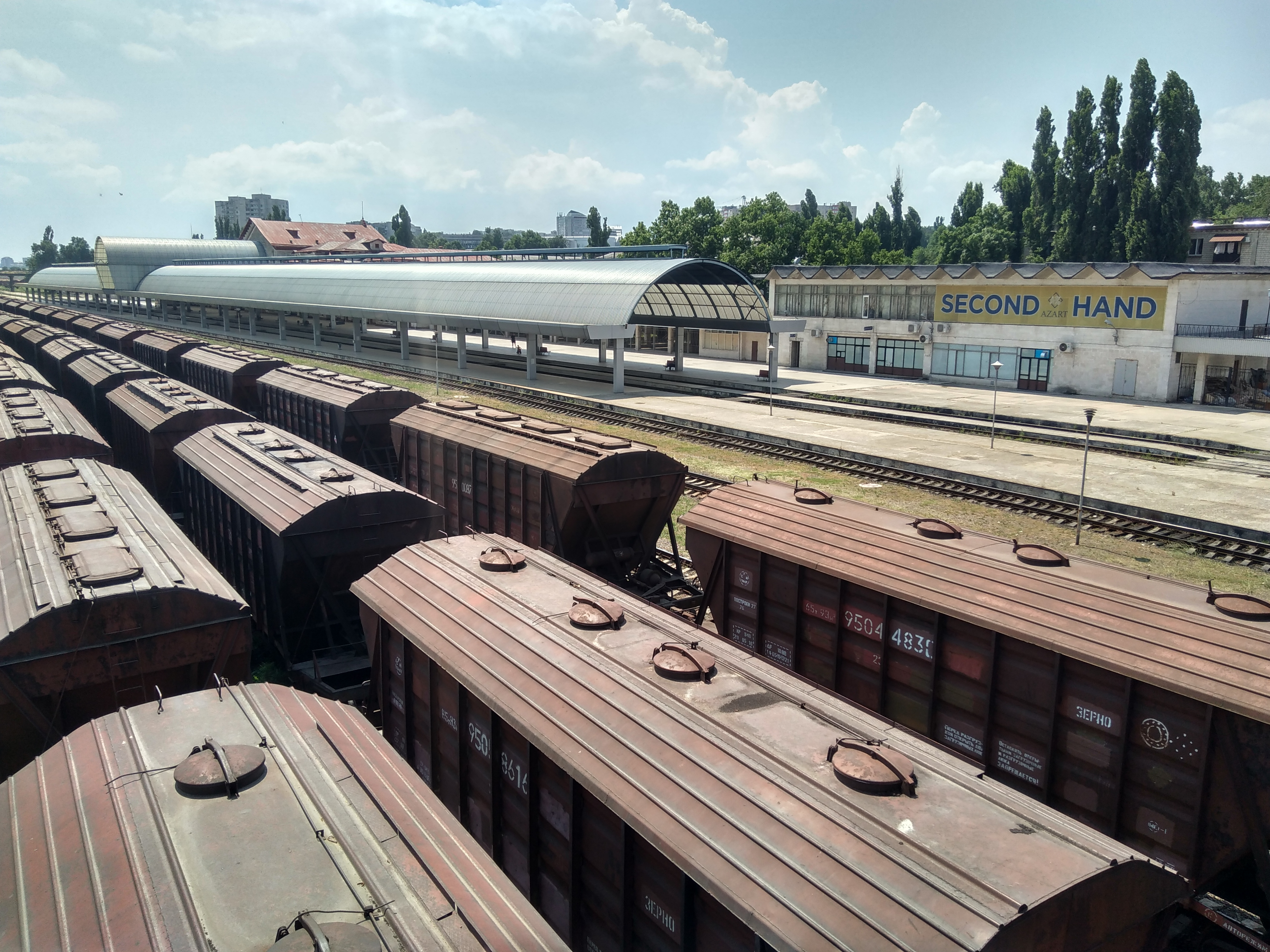

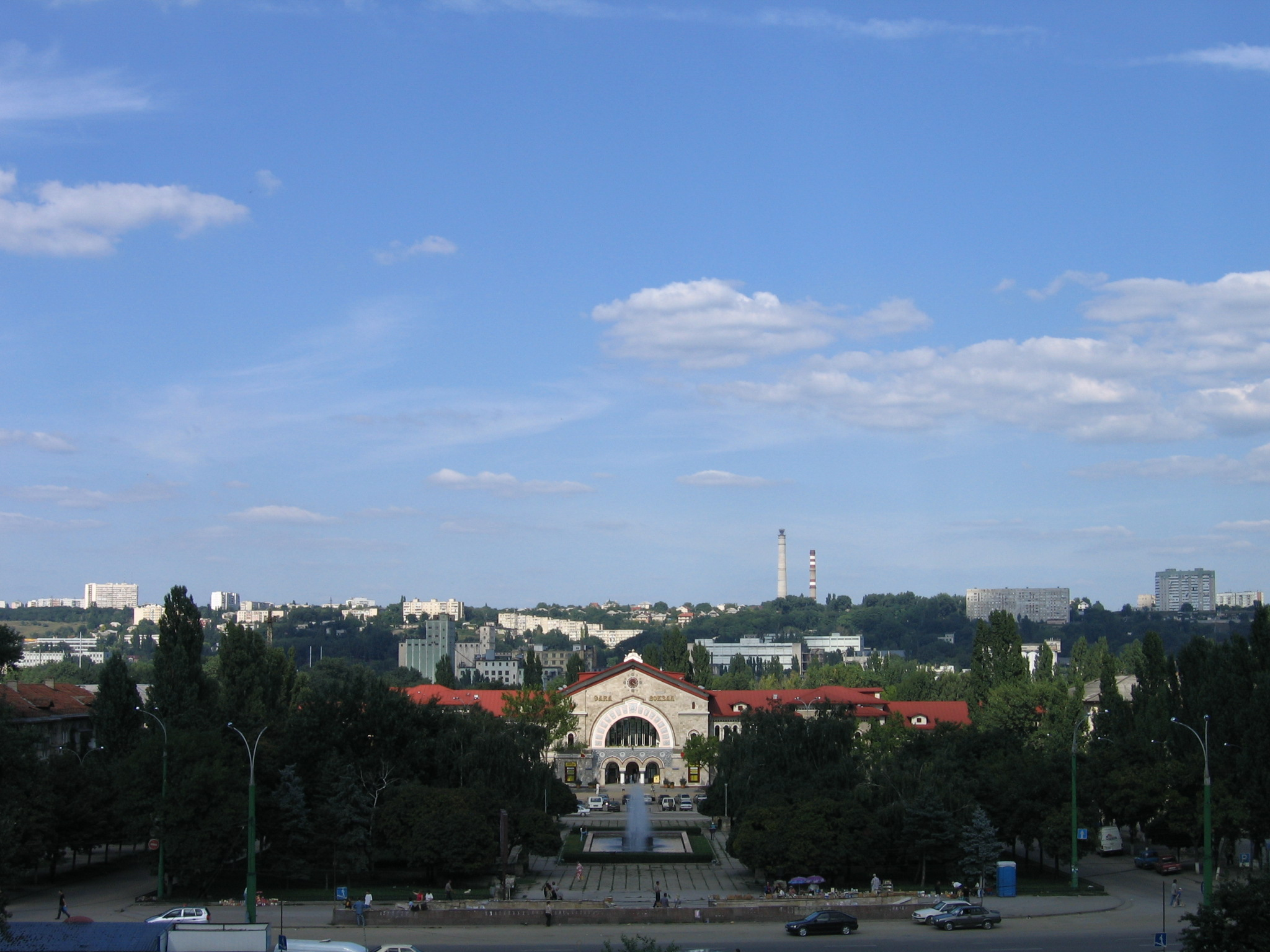
