= Lebedyn (disambiguation) =

Lebedyn is a city in Sumy Oblast, Ukraine.

Lebedyn may also refer to:

- Lebedyn (air base), a former air base in Ukraine
- Lebedyn, Cherkasy Oblast, a village in Shpola Raion, Cherkasy Oblast, Ukraine
- Lebedyn Raion, a raion in Sumy Oblast in Central Ukraine
- Lebedyn, a village in Boryspil Raion, Kyiv Oblast

== See also ==
- Lebedyn cattle, a Ukrainian cattle breed
