= Pivnichne =

Pivnichne (Ukrainian: Північне) may refer to the following places in Ukraine:

- Pivnichne, Donetsk Oblast, urban-type settlement in Donetsk Oblast
- Pivnichne, Sumy Oblast, village in Sumy Oblast
- Pivnichne, Zaporizhzhia Oblast, village in Zaporizhzhia Oblast
