= Cherkasy River Station =

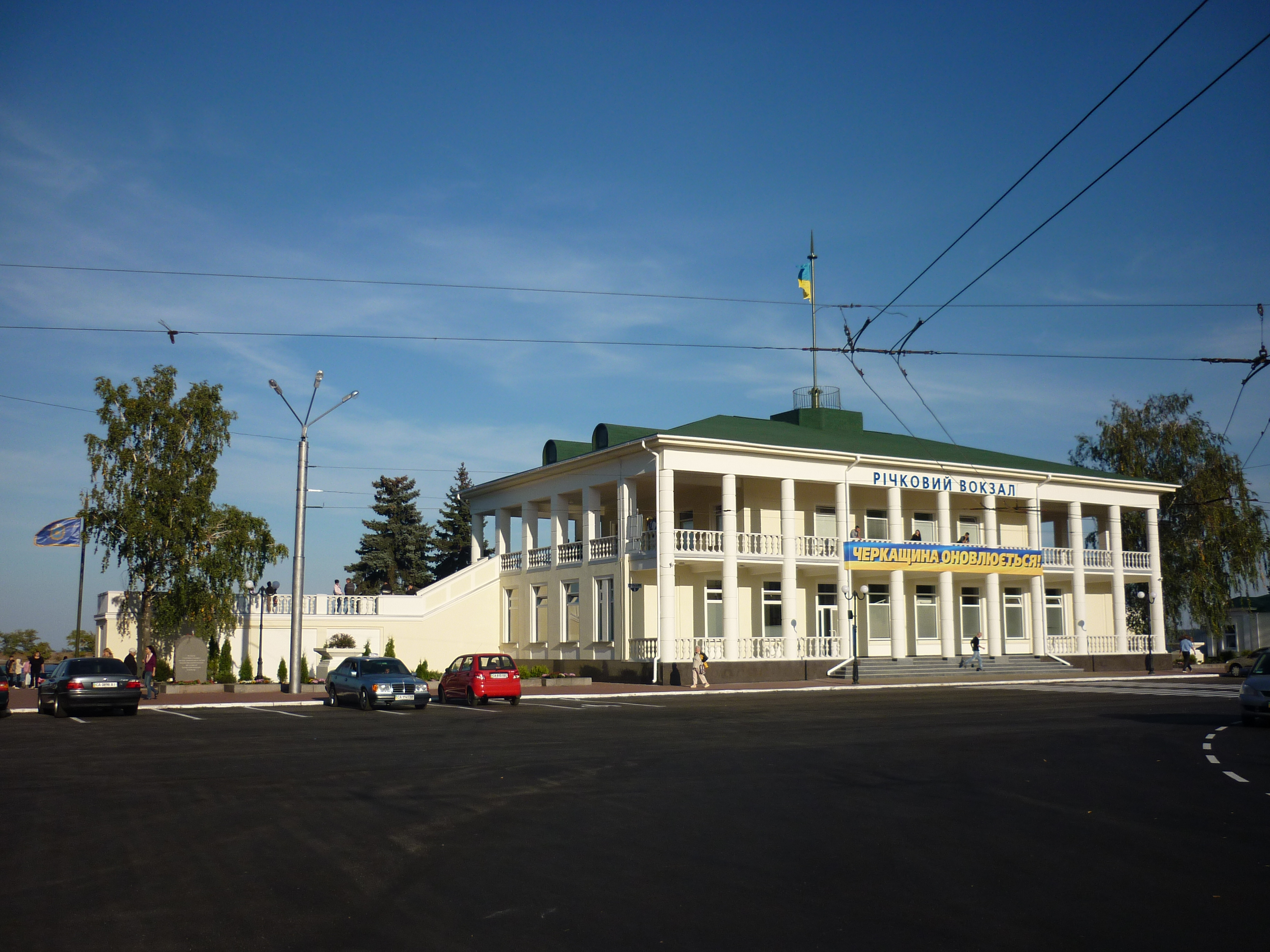
- Interactive map of Cherkasy River Station
- Native name: Черкаський річковий вокзал

Location
- Country: Ukraine
- Location: Cherkasy Oblast, 1 Heroes of Stalingrad Street, Cherkasy
- Coordinates: 49.4355°N 32.1019°E

Details
- Opened: 1961

Cherkasy River Station is a river station at Cherkasy River Port on the Dnieper River within the city of Cherkasy, Ukraine.

== Gallery ==
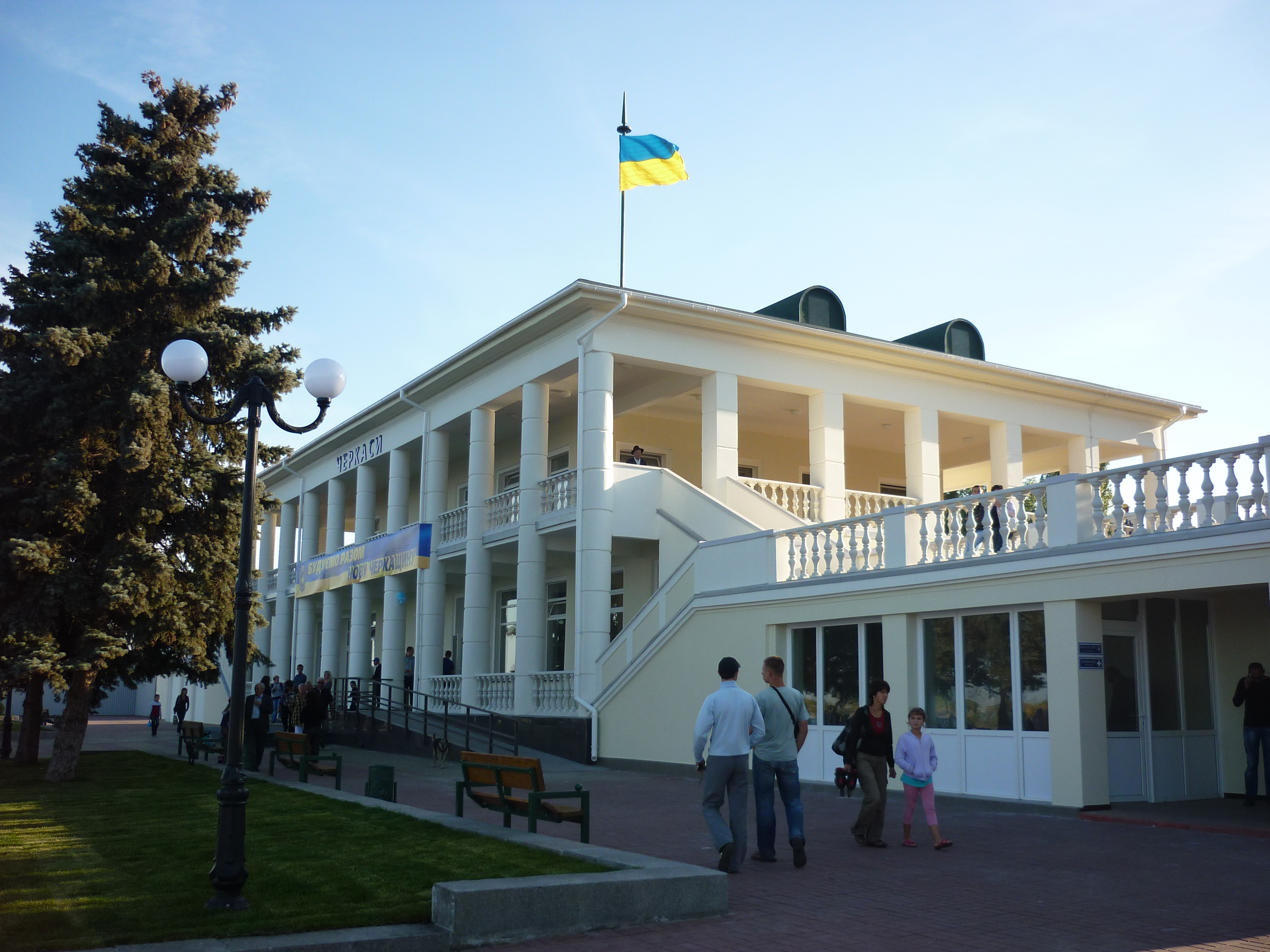
Renovated terminal (river view)

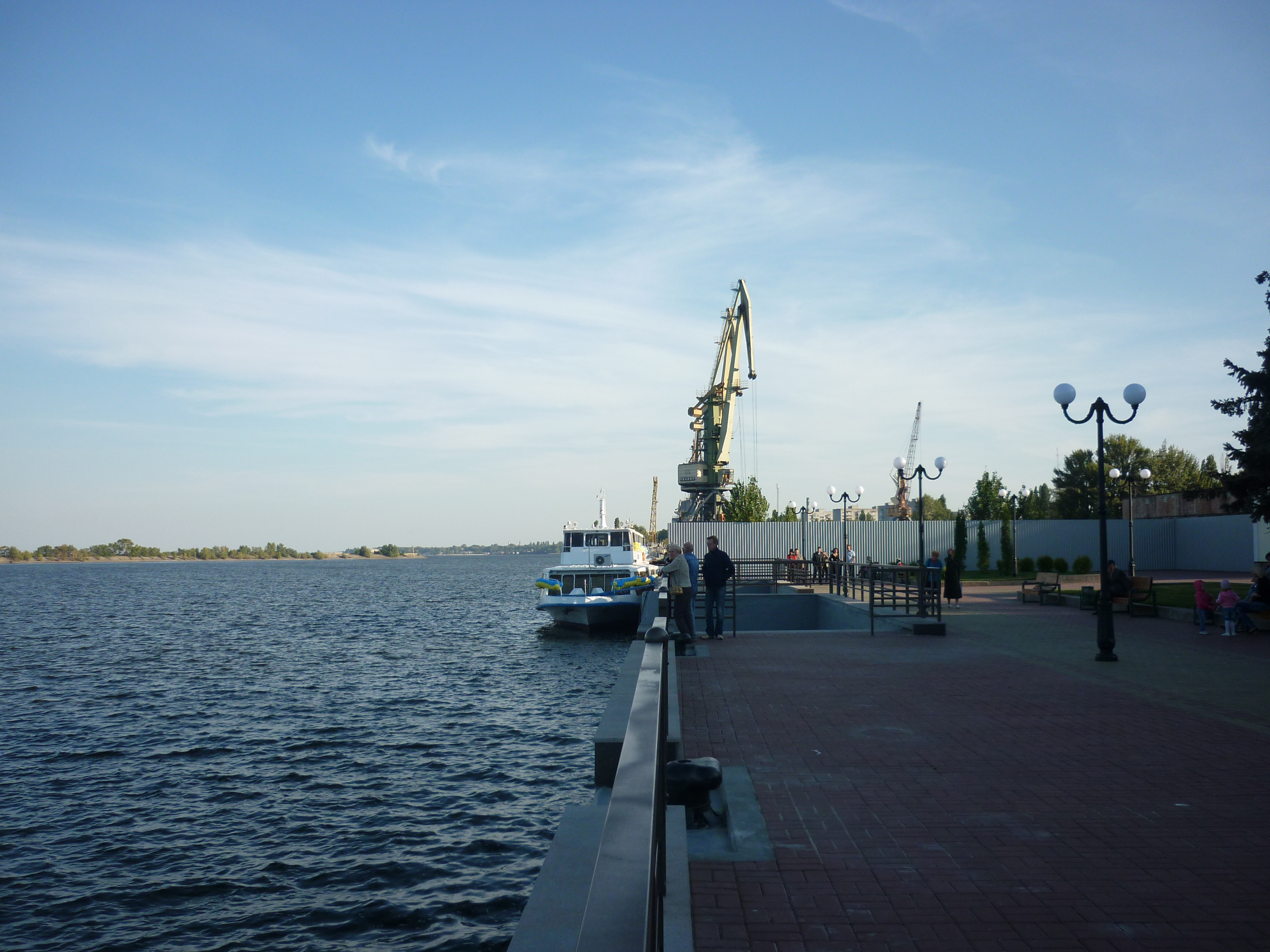
Port view

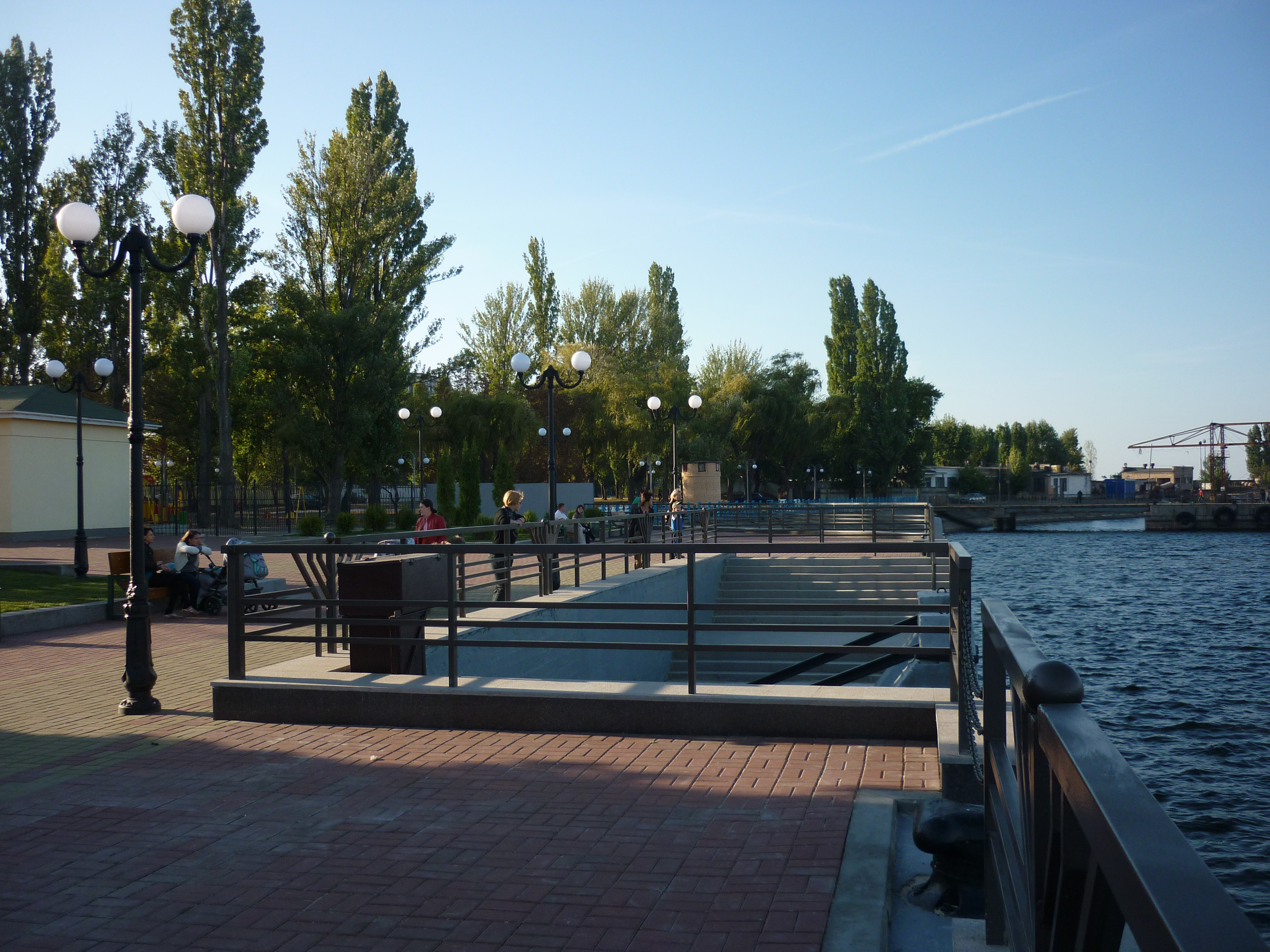
Mooring (view from the cargo port)

== See also ==
- Kyiv River Station
