= Riabushky railway station =

Railway station in Sumy Oblast, Ukraine

Riabushky Рябушки

General information
- Coordinates: 50°34′20″N 34°40′47″E
- System: Southern Railways station
- Owner: Ukrzaliznytsia
- Line: Boromlia–Lebedynska
- Platforms: 1
- Tracks: 1

Other information
- Station code: 445880

History
- Opened: 1895

Services
Preceding station	Ukrzaliznytsia	Following station
Lebedynska	Southern Railways	Boromlia
Location

Riabushky (Ukrainian: Рябушки) is a railway station in Pivnichne, Sumy Oblast, Ukraine. It is on the Boromlia-Lebedynska line of the Sumy Directorate of Southern Railways.

The station is located 16 kilometres (10 mi) away from Lebedynska station and 19 km (12 mi) away from Boromlia station.

== Notes ==
- Tariff Guide No. 4. Book 1 (as of 05/15/2021) (Russian) Archived 05/15/2021.
- Arkhangelsky A.S., Arkhangelsky V.A. in two books. - M.: Transport, 1981. (rus.)
