= Bilka (disambiguation) =

Bilka is a Danish chain of hypermarkets.

Bilka (Bulgarian or Macedonian: билка, meaning herb; Ukrainian: білка, meaning squirrel) may also refer to:

- Bilka, Bulgaria, a village in Bulgaria
- Bilka, Ukraine, a village in Chernihiv Oblast, Ukraine
- Bilka, Sumy Oblast, a village in northern Ukraine

== See also ==
- Bilka, the former German name of Bilca, a commune located in Suceava County, Romania
- Belka (disambiguation)
