= Skriahivka railway station =

Railway station in Sumy Oblast, Ukraine

Skriahivka Скрягівка
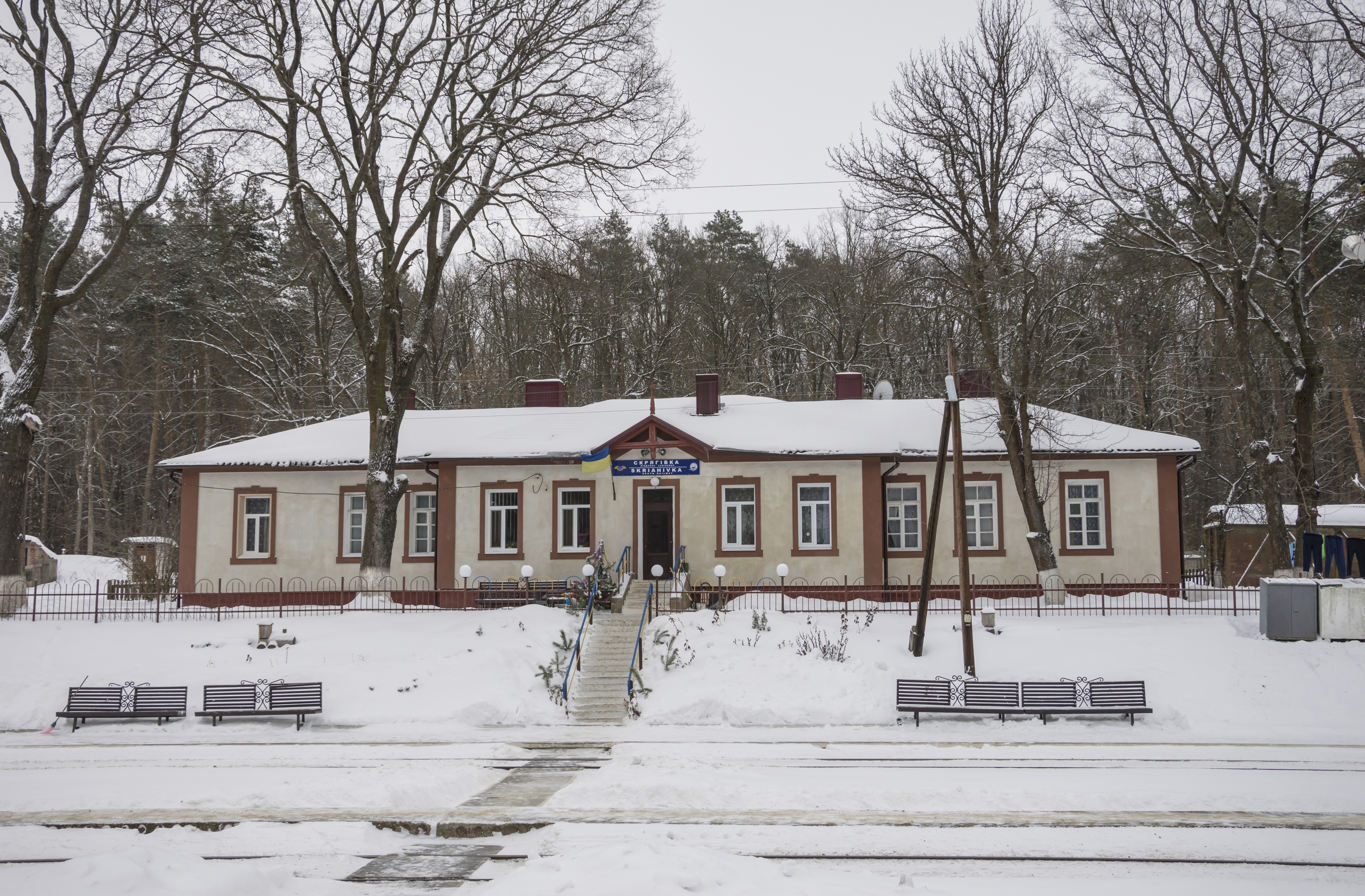

General information
- Coordinates: 50°32′49″N 34°55′21″E
- System: Southern Railways station
- Owner: Ukrzaliznytsia
- Line: Boromlia–Kyrykivka
- Platforms: 2
- Tracks: 3

Other information
- Station code: 445838

History
- Opened: 1908

Services
Preceding station	Ukrzaliznytsia	Following station
Boromlia	Southern Railways	Trostianets-Smorodyne
Location

Skriahivka (Ukrainian: Скрягівка) is a railway station near Bilka, Sumy Oblast, Ukraine. The station is on the Sumy Directorate of Southern Railways on the Boromlia-Kyrykivka line.

Skriahivka is located between Boromlia (13 kilometres (8 mi) away) and Trostianets-Smorodyne (8 km (5 mi) away) stations.

== Notes ==
- Tariff Guide No. 4. Book 1 (as of 05/15/2021) (Russian) Archived 05/15/2021.
