= Velerii Lamakh =

Ukrainian and Soviet painter (1925–1978)

Velerii Pavlovych Lamakh (March 6, 1925, Lebedyn, Sumy Oblast; May 25, 1978, Kyiv) was a Ukrainian Soviet graphic artist, and a prominent representative of the sixties generation and of underground art. He was a member of the Union of Artists of the USSR since 1956.

== Biography ==
In 1939, he entered the Voroshilovgrad Art School. During the German-Soviet War, he was deported to Germany for forced labor. Upon his return, he continued his studies at the school, which he graduated in 1949. In 1949–1954, Vasyl Kasiyan studied at the Faculty of Graphics at the Kyiv Art Institute. He worked in the field of poster and monumental and decorative art, and created a number of works of art in the technique of painting and mosaics in the cities of Kyiv, Dneprodzerzhinsk, Ternopil, and others.

From 1952 he participated in art exhibitions. In 1956–1964 he was an editor at the GOSIZ and Mystetstvo publishing houses. Since 1974, he was an Associate Professor of Book Decoration at the Kyiv evening faculty of Lviv Polygraphic Institute, named after I. Fedorov. He was a teacher of drawing, painting, and composition.

== Writings ==
Velerii Lamakh's work, like that of the other best representatives of the Soviet intelligentsia, was divided into official and unofficial. The first part included monumental and decorative works:

- panel "Friendship of Peoples" in the anteroom of the main pavilion of the ENEA of the USSR (now - the National Expocenter of Ukraine, co-authored, 1958),
- panel "Life" in the Palace of Culture of the chemical plant (Dneprodzerzhinsk, 1969–1971).

The artist, for ideological reasons, could not disclose his most sincere and secret thoughts and created while in the underground. His search for a new artistic language, reflections on the art and structure of the universe, Lamakh embodied in abstract works, manuscripts of the book "Skhemy."

Mosaics

- panel in the interior of the Kyiv River Station (1961, co-authored with Ernest Kotkov and Ivan Litovchenko)
- in the interior of the Boryspil airport terminal (1965, co-authored with Ernest Kotkov and Ivan Litovchenko)
- mosaic "Symphony of Labor" on the facade of a residential building on Peremohy Avenue, 21 in Kyiv (late 1970s, co-authored with Ernest Kotkov).

== Documentary ==
- 2013 - "Velerii Lamakh. The circle of life" (directed by A. Syrykh). The film stars Velerii Lamakh's widow - artist Alina Lamakh, translator Mark Belorusets, composer Valentyn Silvestrov.

== Sources ==
- Валерій Ламах. Оцифрований архів
