= Belka =

Belka may refer to:

== People ==
- Ivan Fedorovich Belka Otyaev, 15th century Russian noble
- Marek Belka (born 1952), former Prime Minister of Poland

== Other uses ==
- Belka, one of the Soviet space dogs
- Belka, Western Australia, a town
- BelKA, a failed 2006 Belarusian satellite
- Belka, a prominent fictional country in the Ace Combat video game franchise

== See also ==
- Bilka (disambiguation)
- Belaka
- Belca
