= Cherkasy River Port =

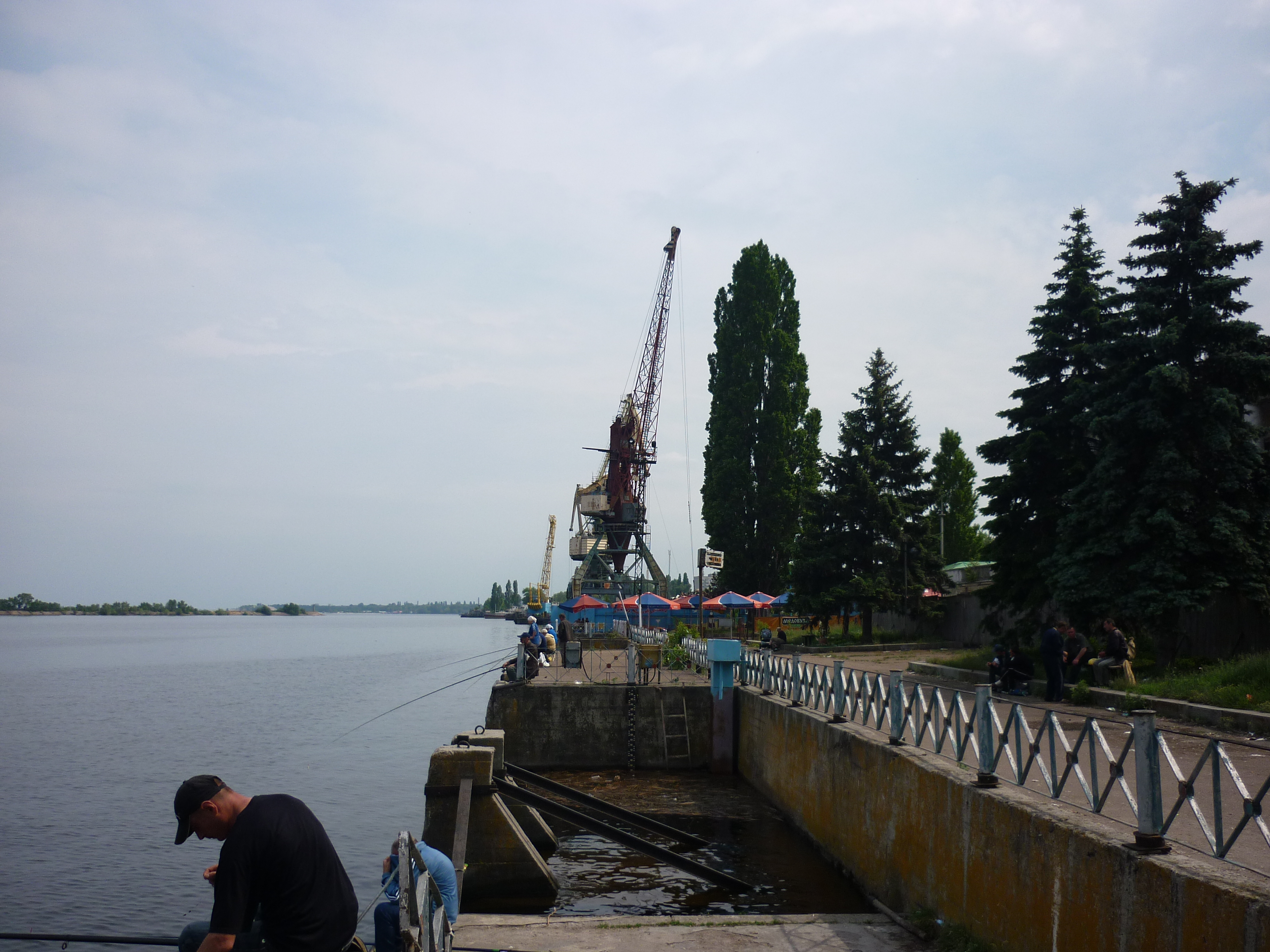
- Native name: Черкаський річковий порт

Location
- Country: Ukraine
- Location: 18016, City of Cherkasy, Yuriy Illyenko Street, 1

Details
- Opened: 1961

Cherkasy River Port is an enterprise in the field of river transport. It is located on the Dnieper in Cherkasy, Ukraine.

== History ==
Until 1961, there was a river pier, later it was transformed into a river port. The goods that passed through it were intended primarily for the construction of the city and region (early AD), so the turnover was small. The situation has changed since 1986, when Cherkasy urea went to Vietnam and India through the port. The port also began transshipment of lumber to Turkey, Cherkasy peat - to France. In the 1990s, sugar cane from Brazil was delivered by barge through the port to the Cherkasy Sugar Refinery, which was then processed into sugar.

In 1996, the Cherkasy River Port Joint Stock Company was established.

== Production capacity ==
Location: 725 kilometers from the mouth of the Dnieper.

Duration of navigation: from April 15 to November 15.

Navigation mode: the port accepts self-propelled river-sea cargo ships with a carrying capacity of up to 3,000 tons, and river vessels with a capacity of 600–2,000 tons. The water area of the port is protected by a wave-dam. Vessels enter the port area through the upper entrance during the entire navigation.

Radio communication: call channel - 5; working channel - 5.

Passenger transshipment complex: Cherkasy river station. Transportation is mainly on local lines.

Bunkering: fuel (upon prior request for the supply of a fuel truck to the berth), and drinking water. Small repairs of ships are possible.

== See also ==
- Cherkasy River Station
- Cargo turnover of Ukrainian ports
