= Lebedyn railway station =

Railway station in Sumy Oblast, Ukraine

Lebedyn Лебединська
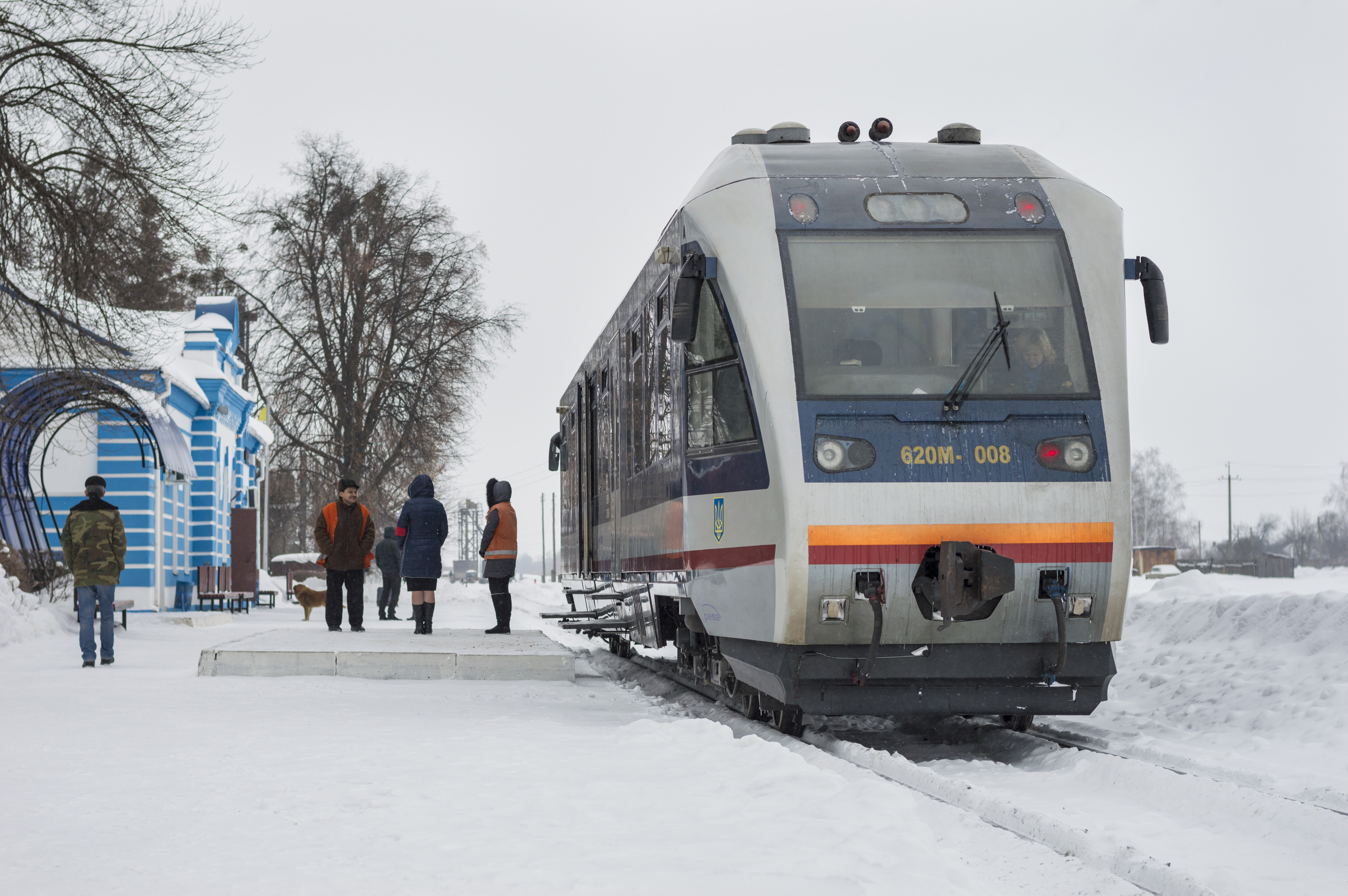

General information
- Coordinates: 50°34′09″N 34°29′27″E
- System: Southern Railways terminus
- Owner: Ukrzaliznytsia
- Line: Boromlia–Lebedyn
- Platforms: 1
- Tracks: 5

Other information
- Station code: 445908

History
- Opened: 1895

Services
Preceding station	Ukrzaliznytsia	Following station
Terminus	Southern Railways	Riabushky
Location

Lebedyn (Ukrainian: Лебединська) is a railway terminus in Lebedyn, Sumy Oblast, Ukraine. It is at the end of the Boromlia–Lebedyn line of the Sumy Directorate of Southern Railways.

The station is located 16 kilometres (10 mi) away from Riabushky station and 36 km (22 mi) away from Boromlia station at the intersection with the main line.

== Passenger service ==
The station serves both passenger and suburban train on a limited schedule.

== Notes ==
- Tariff Guide No. 4. Book 1 (as of 05/15/2021) (Russian) Archived 05/15/2021.
- Arkhangelsky A.S., Arkhangelsky V.A. in two books. - M.: Transport, 1981. (rus.)
