= Lebedyn Oil Plant =

Ukrainian oil refining enterprise

- Native name: Лебединський нафтомаслозавод
- Type: Private limited company
- Founded: 1995
- Headquarters: 42200, Sumy Oblast, Lebedyn, 19 Serpnya Street, 8, Ukraine
- Revenue: 54,714,600 hryvnia (2025)
- Total assets: 19,695,000 hryvnia (2025)
- Number of employees: 36 (2016)

Lebedyn Oil Plant is a Ukrainian oil refining enterprise. The company was founded in late 1994 with the support of the Ukrainian Research Institute of Oil Refining Industry "Masma" (Kyiv) on the basis of a former military facility, as a company with a modern name. The design production capacity was 50 thousand tons per year.

In 2001, the company received an official licence from Daimler Chrysler to use Leol lubricants for Mercedes Benz engines; in 2002, it implemented the ISO 9001:2000 quality management system. The plant also has all the necessary certificates of the State Committee of Ukraine for Standardisation, Metrology and Certification for its products. In 2000-2004, the plant won the All-Ukrainian Quality Competition.

== See also ==
- List of oil refineries
- Azov Lubricants and Oils
