= Mosaics of Kyiv River Station =

- Мозаїки Київського річкового вокзалу
- Interactive map of Mosaics of Kyiv River Station
- Location: Kyiv, Ukraine
- Designer: Ernest Kotkov, Velerii Lamakh, Ivan Itovchenko
- Type: Monumentalism, mosaic
- Beginning date: 1959
- Completion date: 1960
- Dedicated date: Protected by the state

Mosaics of the River Station is a mosaic composition in the interior of the Kyiv River Station, which consists of several panels: "Dnieper - trade route," "Bogdan Khmelnytsky," "Seagulls on the Dnieper," and others.

According to researchers, the mosaics of the river station are the most expressive among the first works made in the style of Ukrainian monumental art of the 1960s.

== History of creation ==
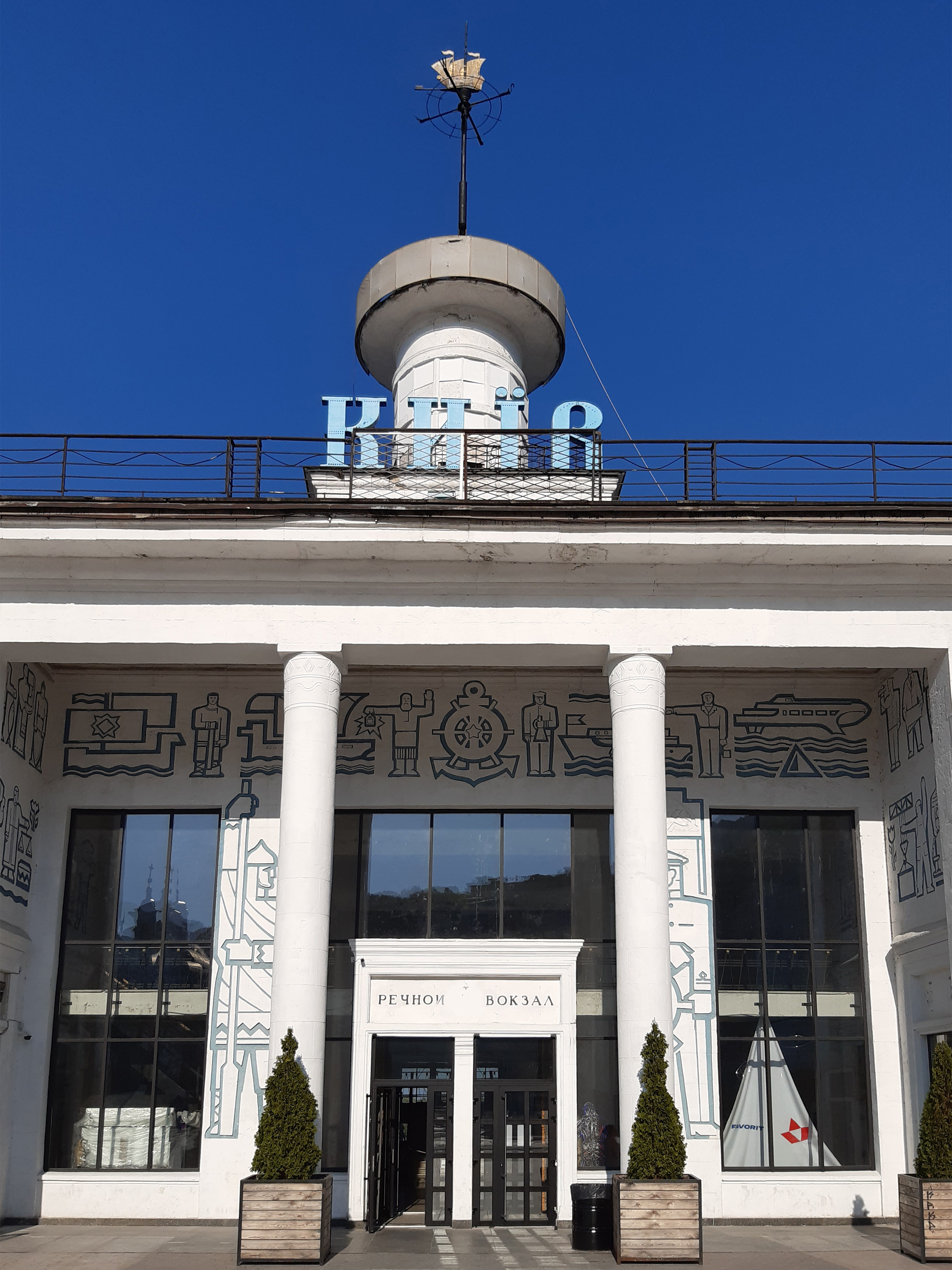
Counter-reliefs on the portico of the river station.

In 1957-1961, the Kyiv River Station was built on Postal Square according to the design of architects Vadym Hopkalo, Vadym Ladny, Hryhoriy Slutsky, and others.

Artists Ernest Kotkov, Velerii Lamakh and Ivan Litovchenko, authors of monumental mosaics on residential buildings on Peremohy Avenue, Boryspil Airport and Shulyavska Metro were invited to decorate the interiors.

After the resolution of November 4, 1955, the resolution of the Central Committee of the CPSU and the Council of Ministers of the USSR "On the elimination of redundancies in design and construction," the decoration of buildings with traditional stucco and decoration was prohibited. From then on, columns, cornices, and walls looked empty. In the 60s the artists were tasked to rectify the situation in view of new circumstances.

The design of the river station was the first significant work of Valerii Lamakh and Ernest Kotkov. According to researchers, this work co-authored with Ivan Litovchenko marked the "birth of a new style in Ukrainian monumental art and the strong establishment of mosaic panels in public interiors."

The artistic solution of the interior space was then perceived as innovative. For the first time, a large amount of cheap ceramic tile mosaics was used to decorate the walls. At that time there was no local base for smalt production. Therefore, the monumentalists used English colored cements and ordinary plumbing tiles, which were painted and re-fired. This bright material gave the stylized compositions a distinctive color. The innovation was manifested in the desire to unite the interiors with the help of art into a single whole, to test new materials and methods of laying ceramic mosaics. The novelty was an attempt to reveal in an allegorical form the purpose of the station building. Separate plots ("Dnipro - trade route," "Bogdan Khmelnytsky," "Ukraine," "Seagulls over the Dnieper," and others), united by a common theme, illustrated the past and present of the city, glorified the Dnieper, and revealed its purpose. The free comparison of different scales, alternation of planes, and rhythms was new. The artists managed to create an ornamental and at the same time epic cycle.

In 2011, along with the reconstruction of the interchange at Postal Square, the reconstruction of the river station was planned. According to preliminary estimates, the cost of the work was to be $5 million.

At the same time, the mosaic panels are in an extremely neglected state. During entertainment events that took place in the station, the mosaic was increasingly damaged. Vandals knocked down tiles and painted graffiti. They painted the lower section of the panel "Dnieper - trade route" black.

== Description ==
=== Counter-reliefs ===
The creative team began to develop the idea of the river fleet, laid down in the form of the building, around the portico of the main entrance. It was emphasized by laconic counter-reliefs (a kind of deepened relief).

=== "Seagulls over the Dnieper" ===
The mosaics "Islands," "Seagulls over the Dnieper," and "Seagulls" were created in the lobby above the entrances to the halls.

=== "Dnipro - trade route" ===
In the first hall the artists placed the panels "Dnipro - trade route," "Bogdan Khmelnytsky," and "All power to the Soviets!". In the second hall they placed the panels "Ukraine" and frescoe compositions "Dnipro Industrial" (or "Labor") and "Rest Dnieper" (or "Rest").

The first panel is devoted to the role of the river in the life of Kievan Rus' in general and the medieval city in particular. At that time, the ancient trade route ran through the Dnieper, which in the Lawrence Chronicle is called "the great way from the Vikings to the Greeks." On it, at the mouth of Pochaina, there was a port.

A mosaic is a panoramic, epic composition in spirit. Stark decoration is achieved due to the contrast of little pieces of shiny ceramic tiles, laid on the main compositional lines and contours, and matte colored cement background.

=== "Bogdan Khmelnitsky" ===
"Bogdan Khmelnytsky" an almost obligatory plot for those times, is also symbolically connected with the theme. It reminds of the hetman's war of liberation, which helped unite the parts of Ukraine divided by the Dnieper.

It is located opposite the panel "Dnieper - trade route."

According to art critics, a schematic interpretation of the figures and the applicability of spatial plans make this panel less interesting than the first.

=== "All power to the Soviets!" ===
The mosaic panels "Islands," "All power to the Soviets!" and "Ukraine" are at the back walls of the first and second waiting rooms.

The composition "All power to the Soviets!" told of the Arsenal uprising against the Central Rada in January 1918. The image is permeated with poster pathos.

=== "Ukraine" ===
In the second waiting room there are several panels arranged in the form of a frescoe, which were united by the main mosaic "Ukraine."

The girl in a national costume stands with a sheaf of wheat near the river dam, personifies the country's "breadbasket" image. According to researchers, the panel has a very stereotypical appearance.

=== Frescoes ===
The frozen and colorfully rich panel "Ukraine" with its dynamism and modest color scheme contradicts the frescoes "Industrial Dnieper" and "Rest on the Dnieper."

=== Sgraffito ===
The decorative design of the building is completed by the sgraffito "Sports on the Dnieper" on the wall of the staircase, which leads to the open terrace of the restaurant. Images of athletes and girls with oars evoke distant associations with the art of the 1930s. At the same time, they are deprived of ideological connotations.

== See also ==
- Kyiv River Port
- Kyiv River Station
- List of ports in Ukraine
