= Boromlia railway station =

Railway station in Sumy Oblast, Ukraine

Boromlia Боромля
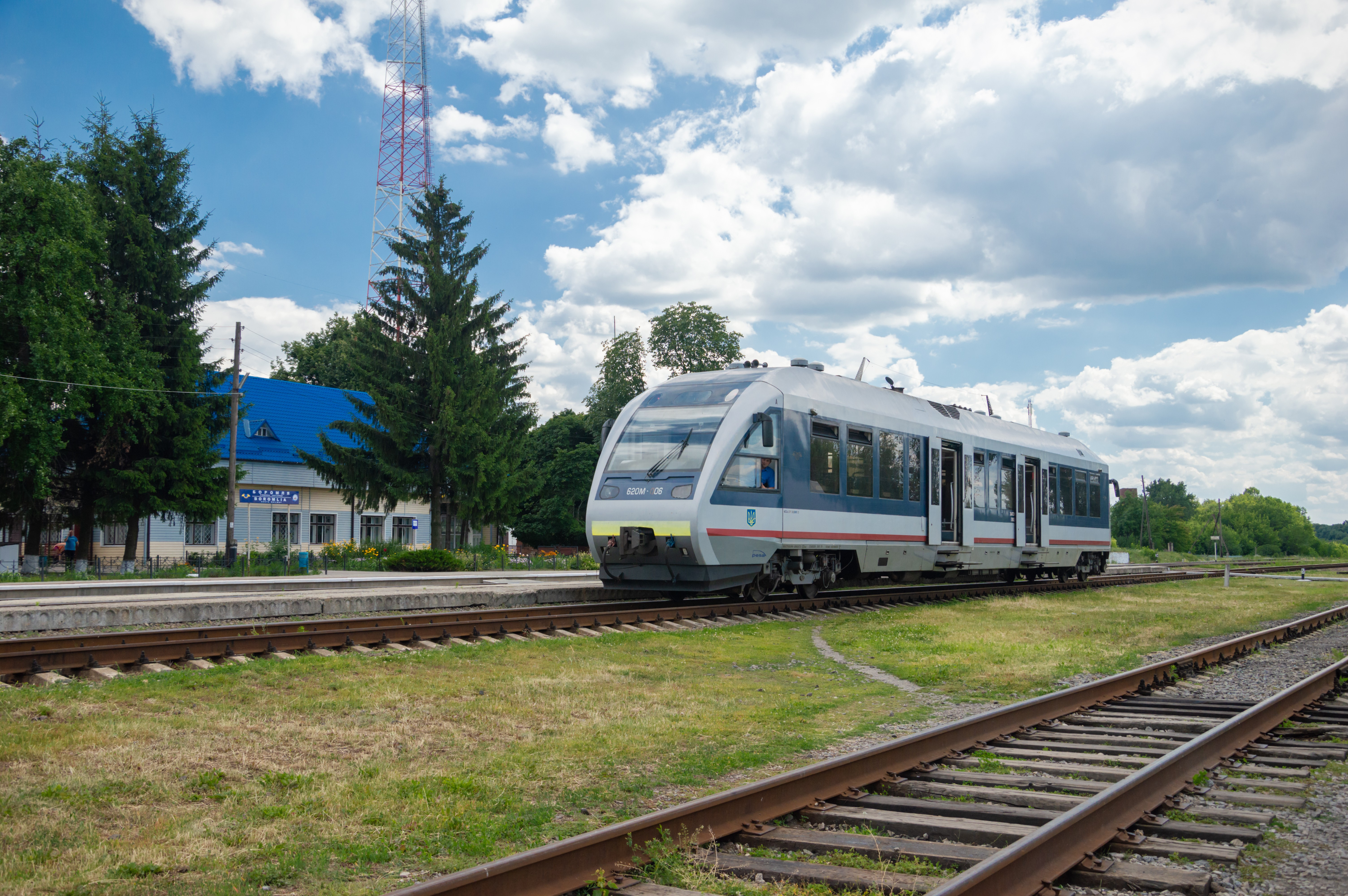

General information
- Location: Korniienka Street, Novhorodske, Ukraine
- Coordinates: 50°39′03″N 34°52′38″E
- System: Southern Railways station
- Owner: Ukrzaliznytsia
- Lines: Boromlia–Lebedynska; Basy–Boromlia; Boromlia–Kyrykivka
- Platforms: 1
- Tracks: 1

Other information
- Station code: 445804

History
- Opened: 1895; 131 years ago
- Rebuilt: 1970; 56 years ago, 2008; 18 years ago

Services
| Preceding station | Ukrzaliznytsia | Following station |
|---|---|---|
| Imeni Vasylia Nesvita | Southern Railways | Riabushky |
| Imeni Vasylia Nesvita | Southern Railways | Skriahivka |
Location

Boromlia (Ukrainian: Боромля) is a railway station in Novhorodske (near Boromlia), Sumy Oblast, Ukraine. It is at the intersection of three lines of the Sumy Directorate of Southern Railways: the Boromlia-Lebedynska line, the Basy-Boromlia line, and the Boromlia-Kyrykivka line.

The station is located 11 kilometres (7 mi) away from Imeni Vasylia Nesvita station and 13 km (8 mi) away from Skriahivka station.

== History ==
The station was opened in 1878 as part of the Kharkiv-Mykolaiv Railway. In the same year, the station adopted its first train - a small train with coal, which was supplied for the furnace of the only roller mill in the district. In the following years, traffic at the station became much more active, and the station sent an average of more than one million tons of cargo per year, mostly bread, and received twice less cargo. In 1895 a small branch was built to the Lebedynska station, thanks to which the station became a hub. The station, like the village (8 km from the station), got its name from the river Boromlia (from the words "bir" (certain type of forest) and "imla" (mist)), because around the river there are dense forests and in the valley there often was mist. Anton Chekhov mentioned the station in his letters, comparing Boromlia with small and quiet villages on a trip across the Urals, where there are mostly industrial cities that are noisy.

During the turbulent 20th century the station was destroyed, and to this day no historic building has survived, except for the barracks for railroad workers. The station was particularly hit hard by World War II. It was then captured by German troops and liberated on 10 August 1943 during the Battle of Kursk. The mass grave located near the station, where 66 soldiers who defended their native land are buried, reminds of these events.

The modern station was built in the 1970s according to a typical project. It is devoid of any decor - a typical example of functionalism. In 2008, the station was reconstructed, and it acquired its modern appearance.

== Passenger service ==
The station serves both passenger and suburban trains.

== Notes ==
- Tariff Guide No. 4. Book 1 (as of 05/15/2021) (Russian) Archived 05/15/2021.
- Arkhangelsky A.S., Arkhangelsky V.A. in two books. - M.: Transport, 1981. (rus.)
