= Trostianets-Smorodyne railway station =

Railway station in Trostianets, Ukraine

Trostianets-Smorodyne Тростянець-Смородине
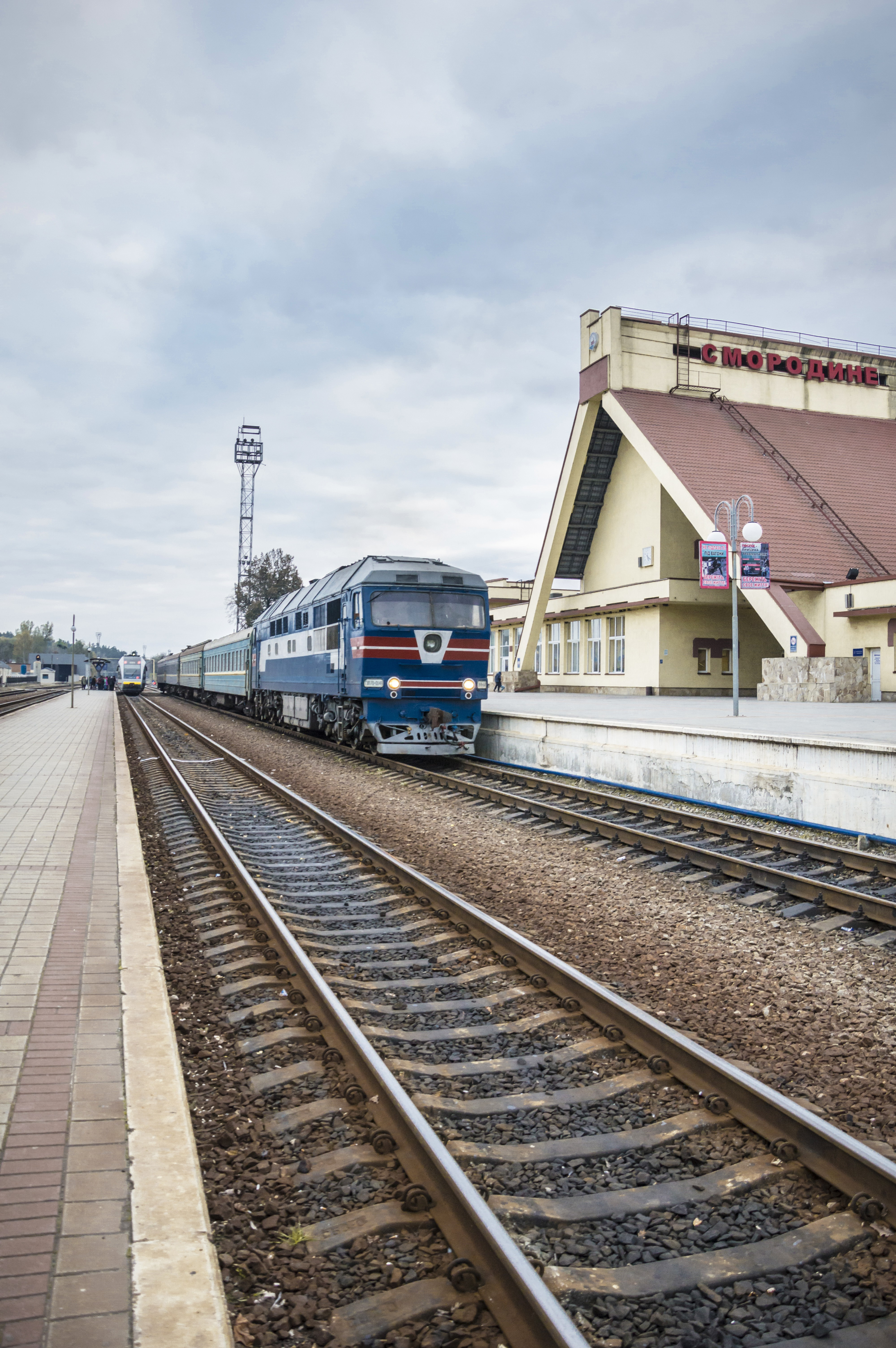

General information
- Location: 40th Army Square, Trostianets, Ukraine
- Coordinates: 50°28′36″N 34°58′19″E
- System: Southern Railways station
- Owner: Ukrzaliznytsia
- Line: Boromlia–Kyrykivka
- Platforms: 2
- Tracks: 4

Construction
- Parking: Yes

Other information
- Station code: 446008

History
- Opened: 1878
- Rebuilt: 1982

Services
Preceding station	Ukrzaliznytsia	Following station
Skriahivka	Southern Railways	Kyrykivka
Location

Trostianets-Smorodyne (Ukrainian: Тростянець-Смородине), until 1893 Trostianets and preceding 2018 Smorodyne is a railway station in Trostianets, Ukraine. It is a major passenger station on the Southern Railways Boromlia-Kyrykivka line and is located in the center of Trostianets.

The station is located nine kilometres (6 mi) away from Skriahivka and twenty-two kilometres (14 mi) away from Kyrykivka.

== History ==
The Smorodyne section of the Kharkiv-Mykolaiv railway was created from 1871 to 1877. To organize train and shunting work in 1877, a locomotive depot was built and 12 locomotives were purchased. The station was founded in 1878 and was originally called Trostianets. On January 21 (February 2), 1893, the Minister of Railways ordered Trostianets station of the Kharkiv-Mykolaiv Railway to be renamed Smorodyne station after the name of the nearby village. Today the village of Smorodyne is part of the city of Trostianets. The first station house was built in 1878 and was originally wooden.

In 1982, a new station complex was built thanks to the allocated funds of the Southern Railways management. During the construction, the city's industrial enterprises provided great assistance. The station was built according to an individual project, which had no analogues on the railways of the USSR. This project was awarded the USSR State Prize. Residents of Trostianets call the railway station "the hospitable gate". From the city side, the station resembles a hut. Nearby are the EC post and a magnificent railway monument with an Em708-89 locomotive, which was built in 1935 at the Izhora plant "Red Profintern".

At Trostianets-Smorodyne station there is a locomotive depot (TC-8), a locomotive maintenance point (PTOL), an operation and repair shop, a locomotive crew rest house, a household building and a museum of the history of the Trostianets-Smorodyne locomotive depot.

On 40th Army Square, near the station, a T-34-85 tank was installed in honor of the 183rd Tank Brigade, which distinguished itself in the battles during the liberation of the city of Trostianets from Nazi invaders.

On October 31, 1962, the Smorodyne branch of Southern Railways was reorganized into the Sumy branch with the administrative center in Sumy. Prior to that, the branch office was located in Liubotyn.

From August 22, 2018, in accordance with the order of CM-15/336, the station received its modern name. From September 14, 2019, the official website of Ukrzaliznytsia uses the name of the station Trostianets-Smorodyne.

During the 2022 Russian invasion of Ukraine the railway station was used as headquarters by the Russian military. A battle that ensued with the Ukrainian army caused substantial damage to the station.

At the beginning of 2025, the restoration of the railway station has started. In April 2025, a smaller part of the station has reopened.

== Passenger service ==
Long-distance passenger trains, regional, and suburban trains stop at Trostianets-Smorodyne station.

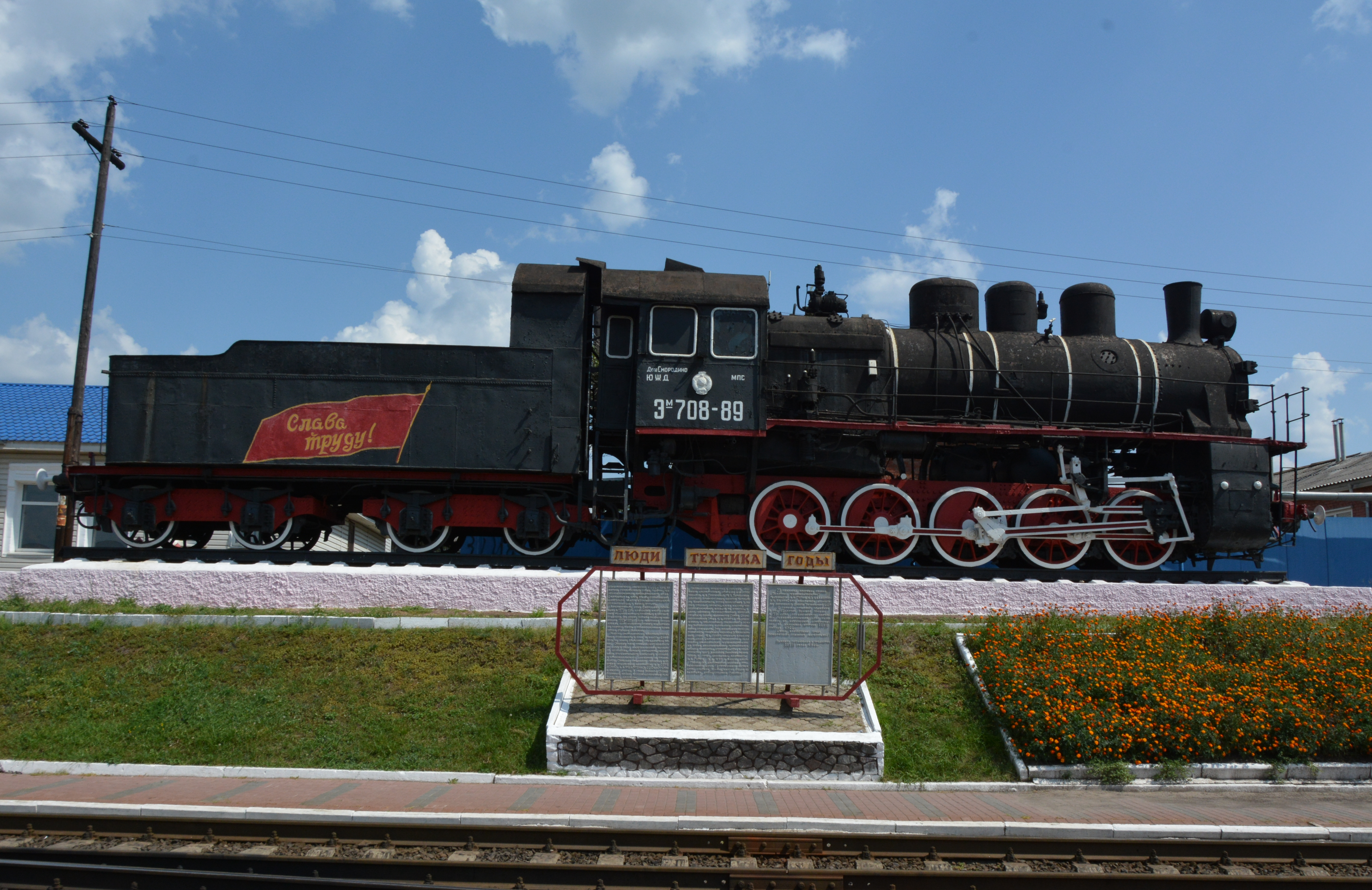
Em708-89 locomotive at Trostianets-Smorodyne

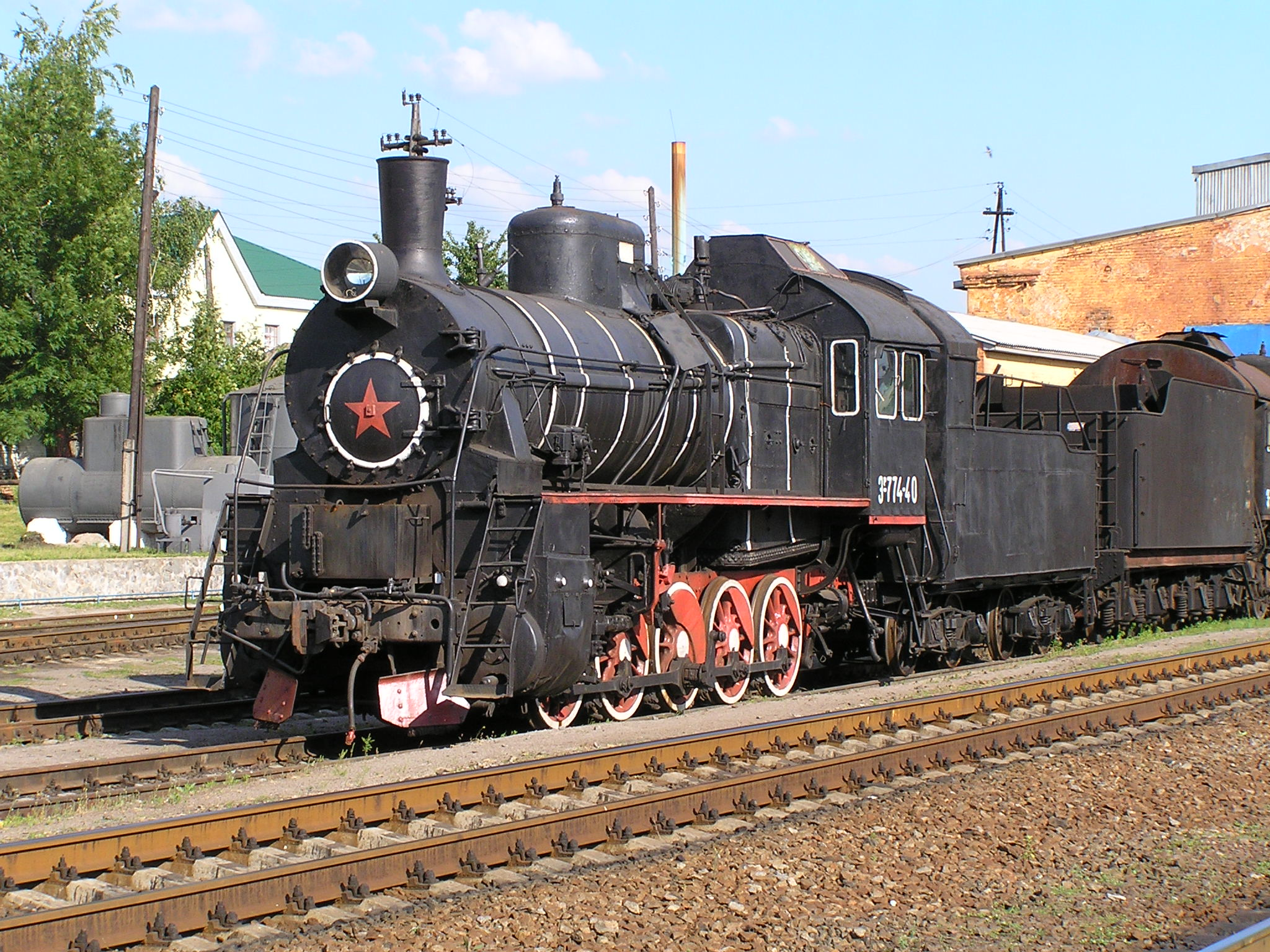
Steam locomotive Er 774-40 in the locomotive depot of the station (installed in the Southern Railway Museum in Kharkiv in 2014)

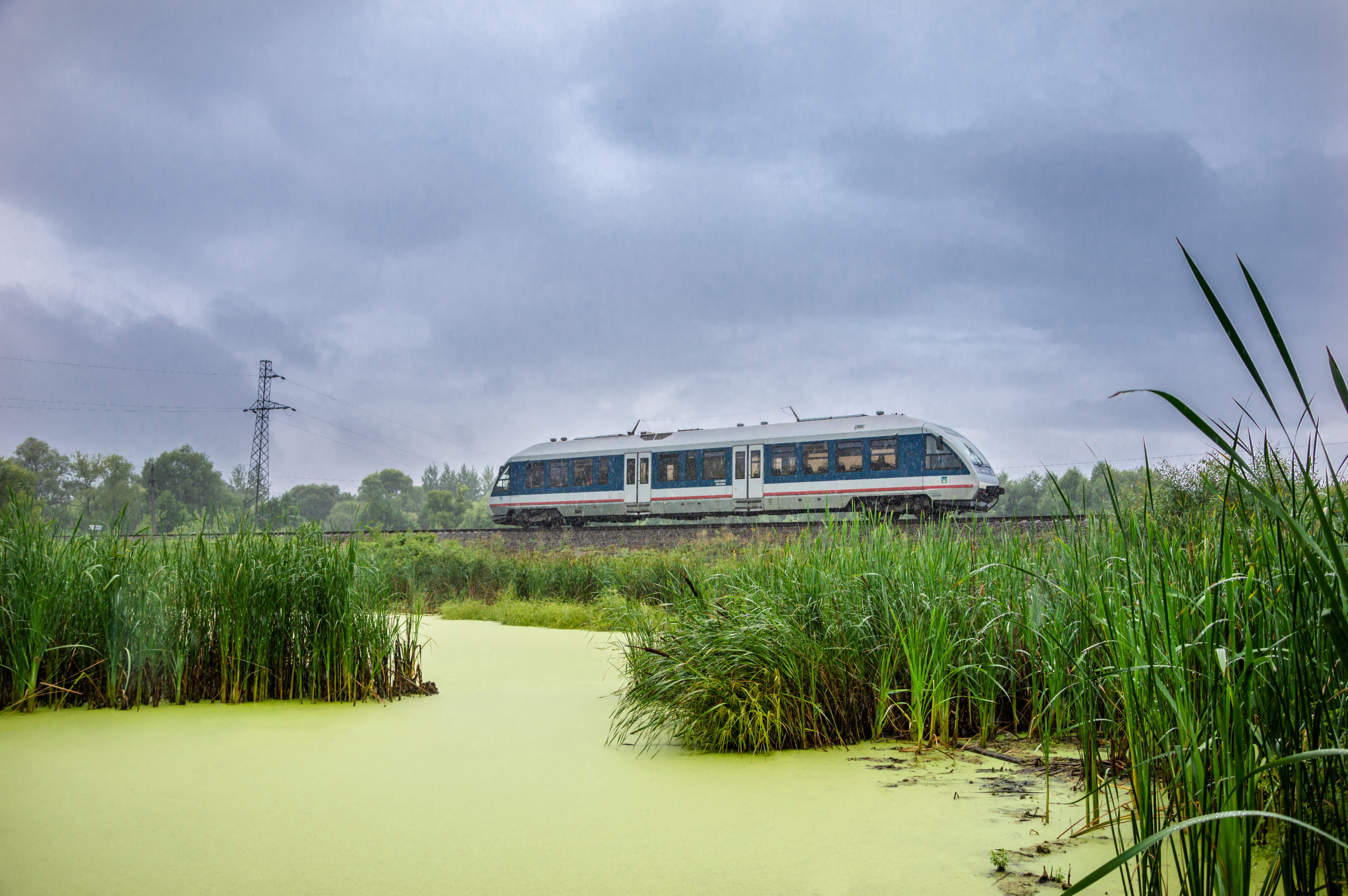
Rail bus PESA 620M-006 near Smorodyne station

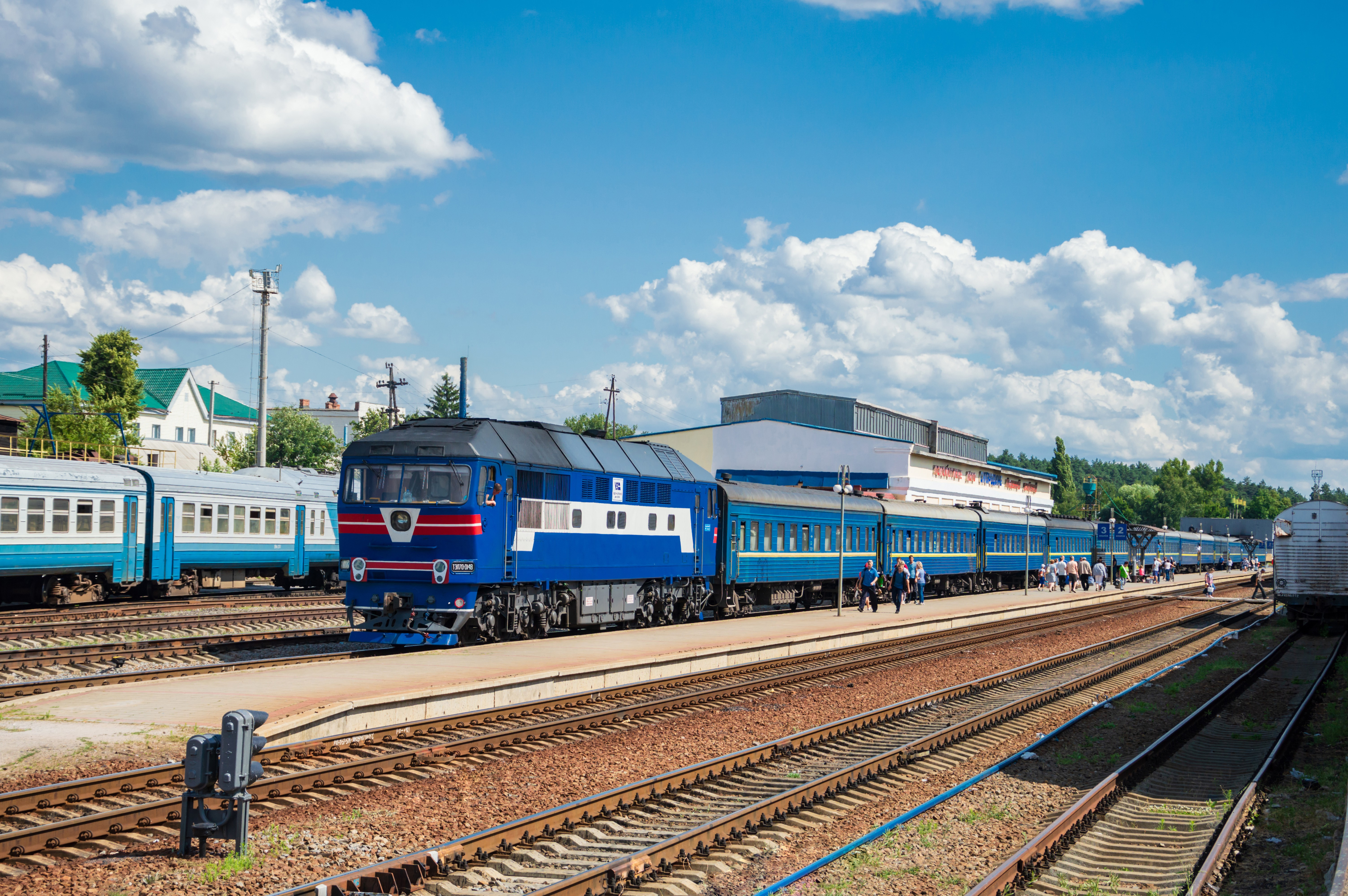
TEP70-0148 with a passenger train at Smorodyne station

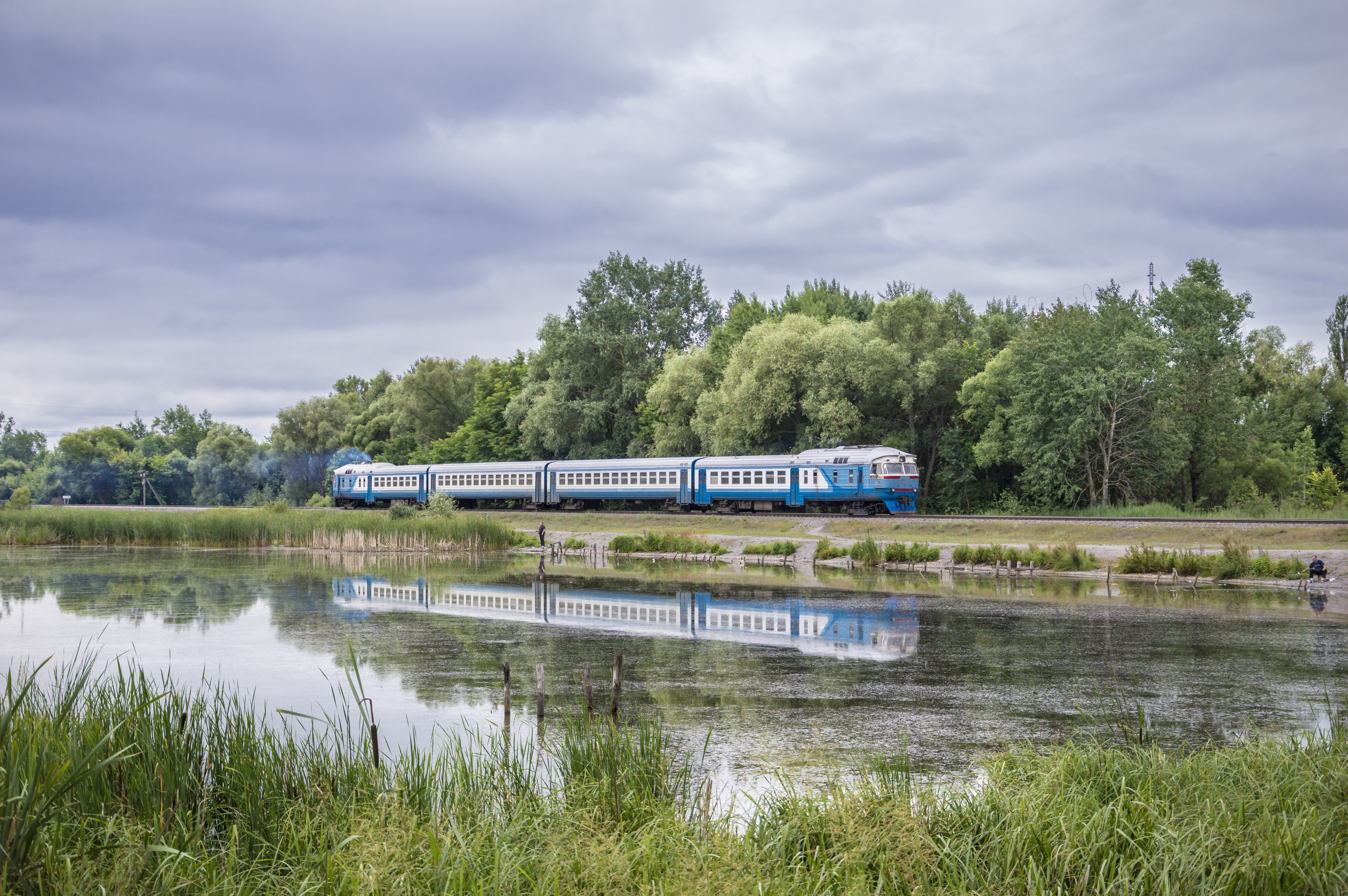
Diesel train DR1a-287 near Smorodyne station

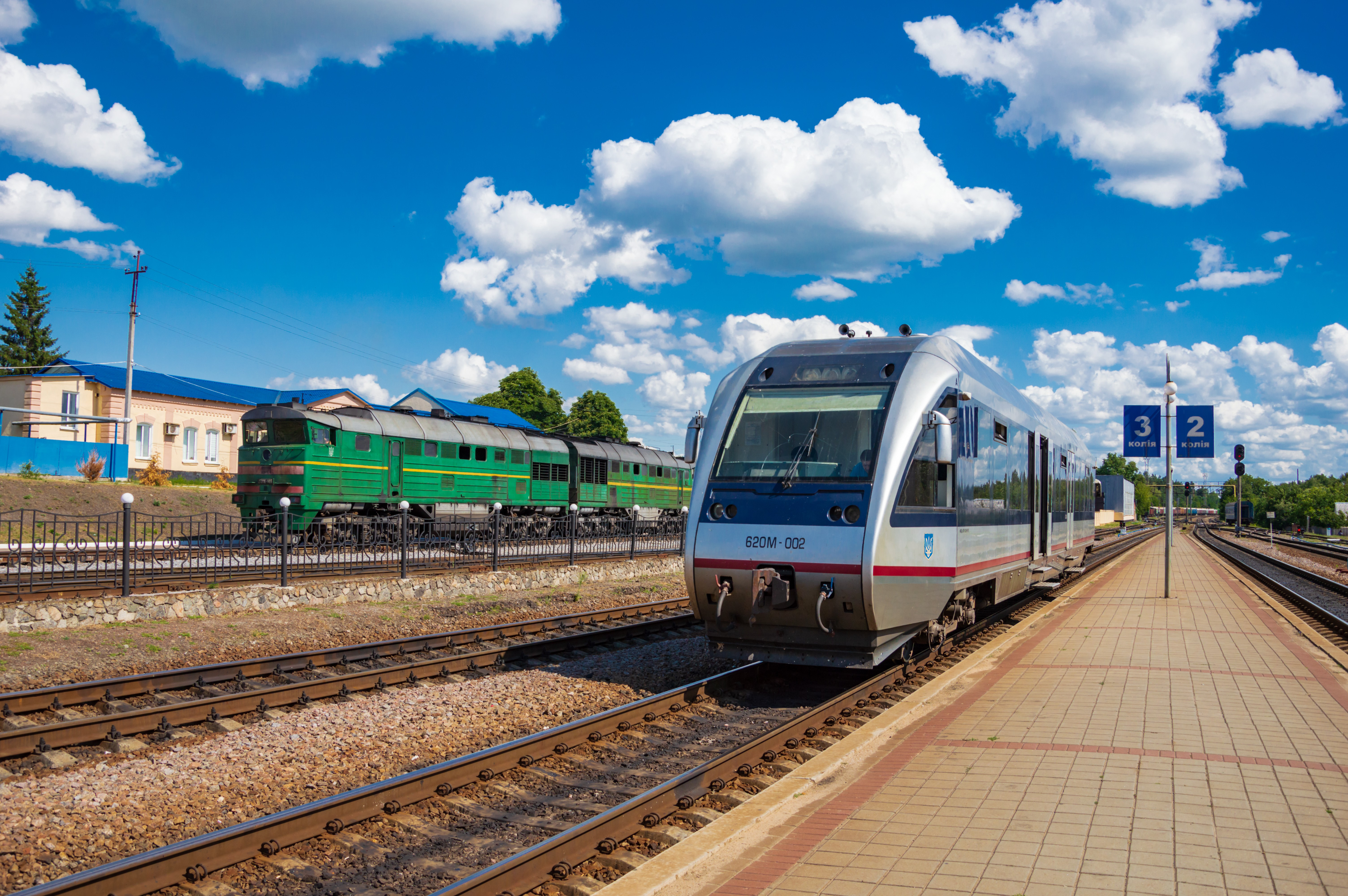
Trains at Smorodyne station

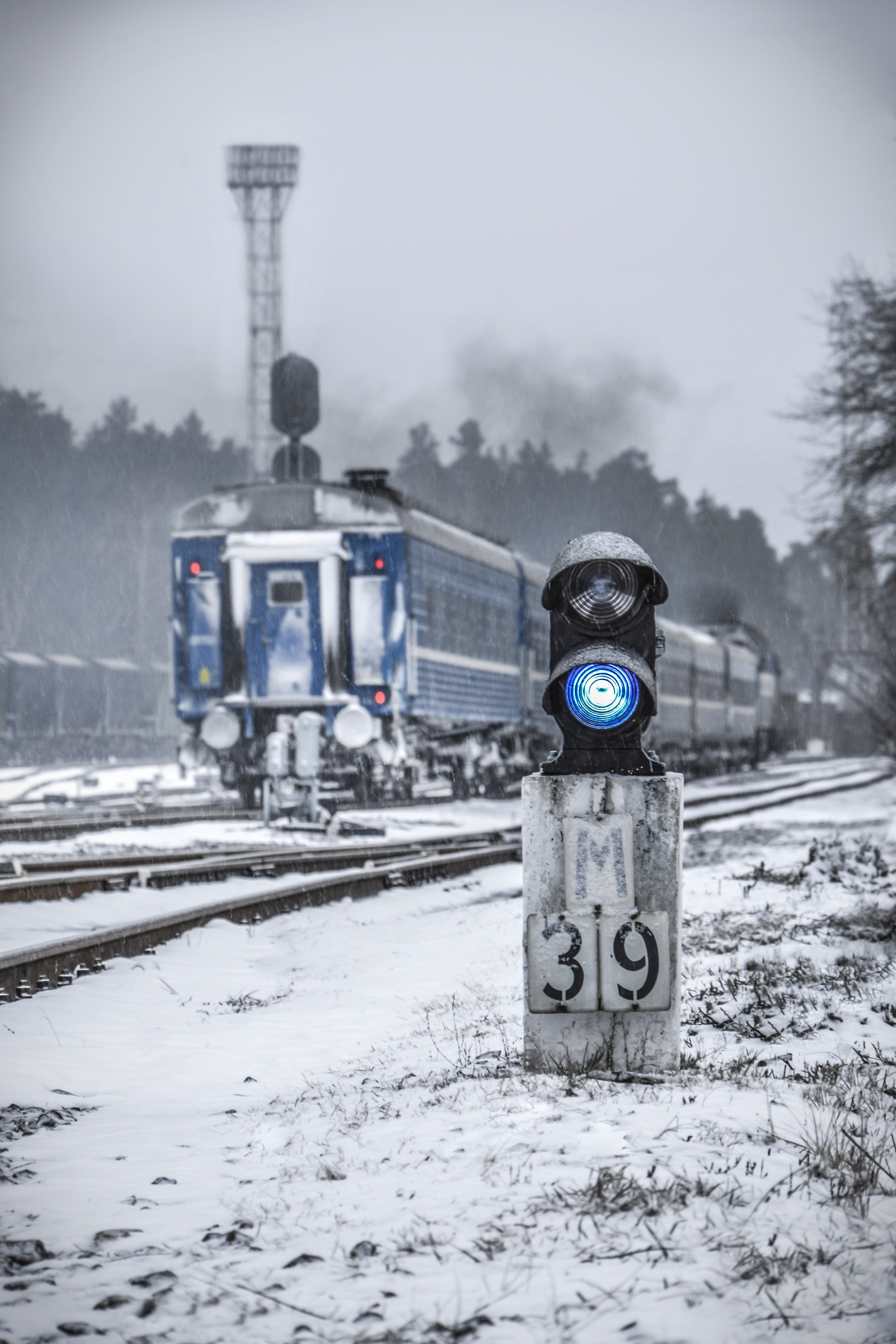
Train and Smorodyne winter station

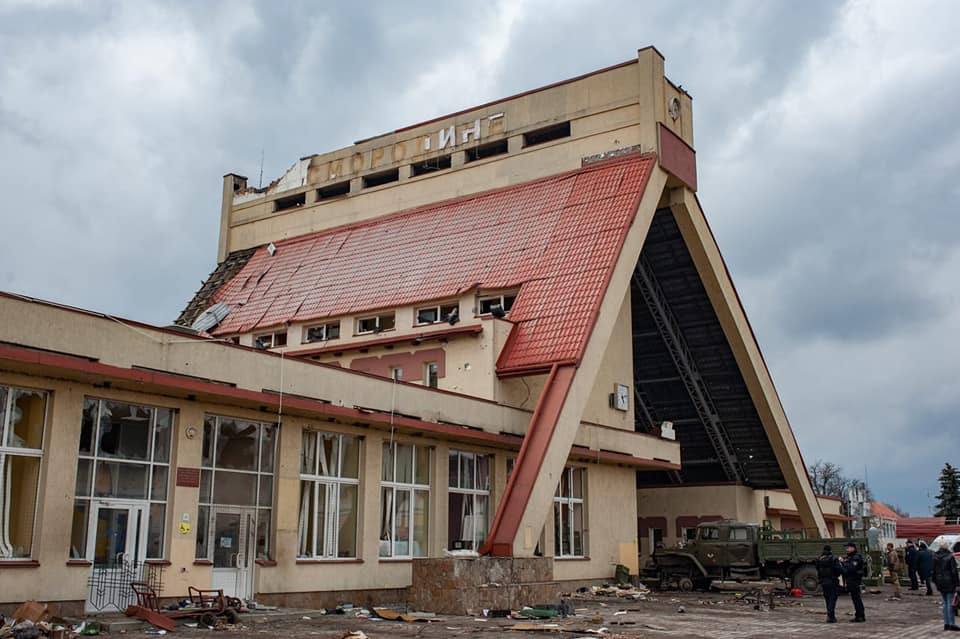
After the Battle of Trostianets

== Notes ==
- Tariff Guide No. 4. Book 1 (as of 05/15/2021) (Russian) Archived 05/15/2021.
