= Kyiv River Station =

- Київський річковий вокзал
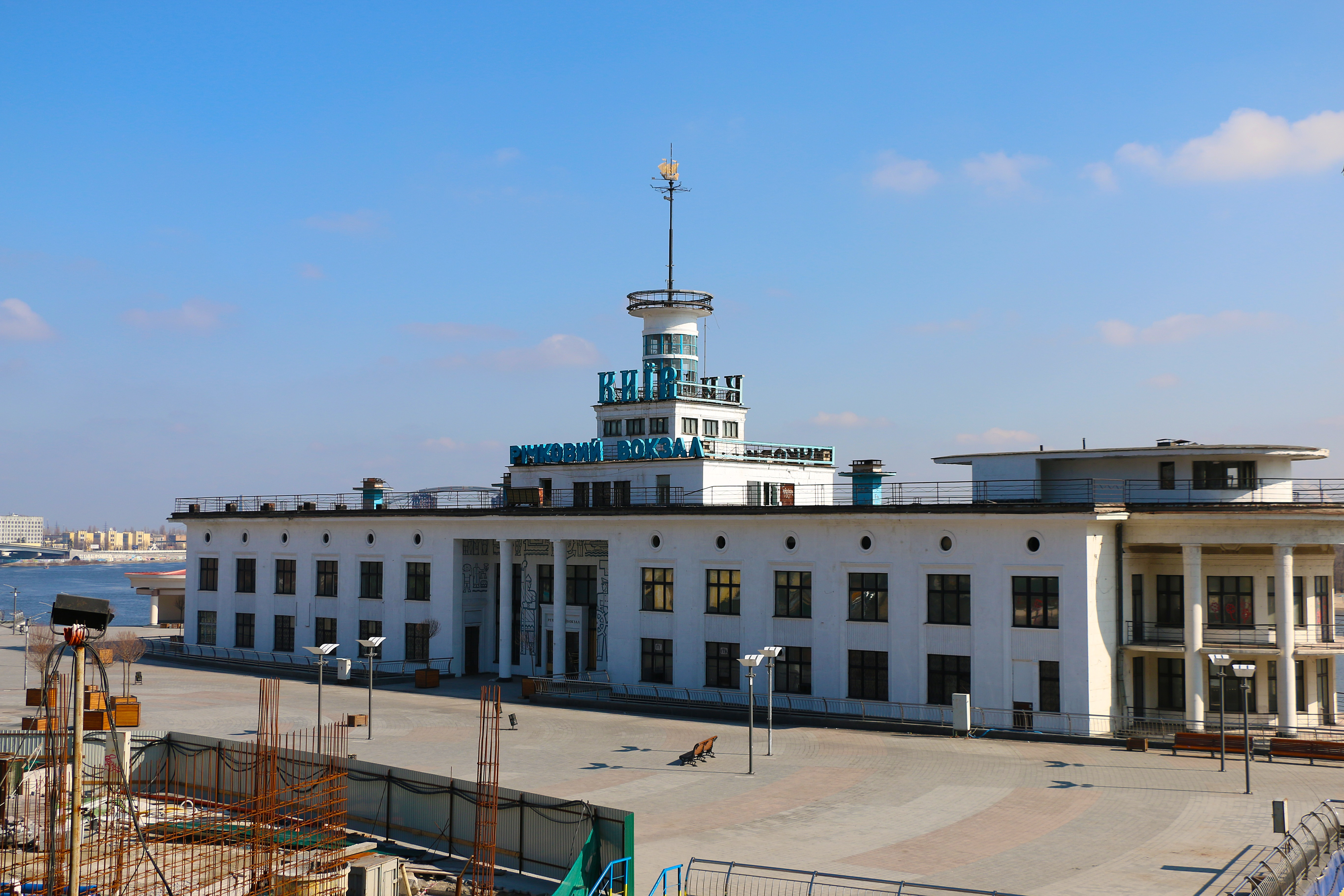
- Interactive map of the Kyiv River Station area

General information
- Location: Kyiv, Podilskyi Raion, Postal Square, Kyiv, Ukraine
- Coordinates: 50°27′33″N 30°31′37″E
- Inaugurated: 1961

Immovable Monument of Local Significance of Ukraine
- Official name: Річковий вокзал (River station)
- Type: Architecture, Urban Planning, Monumental Art
- Reference no.: 971-Кв

Kyiv River Station is the main river port of Kyiv, located on the right bank of the Dnieper in Podil in the historical part of the city.

== History ==
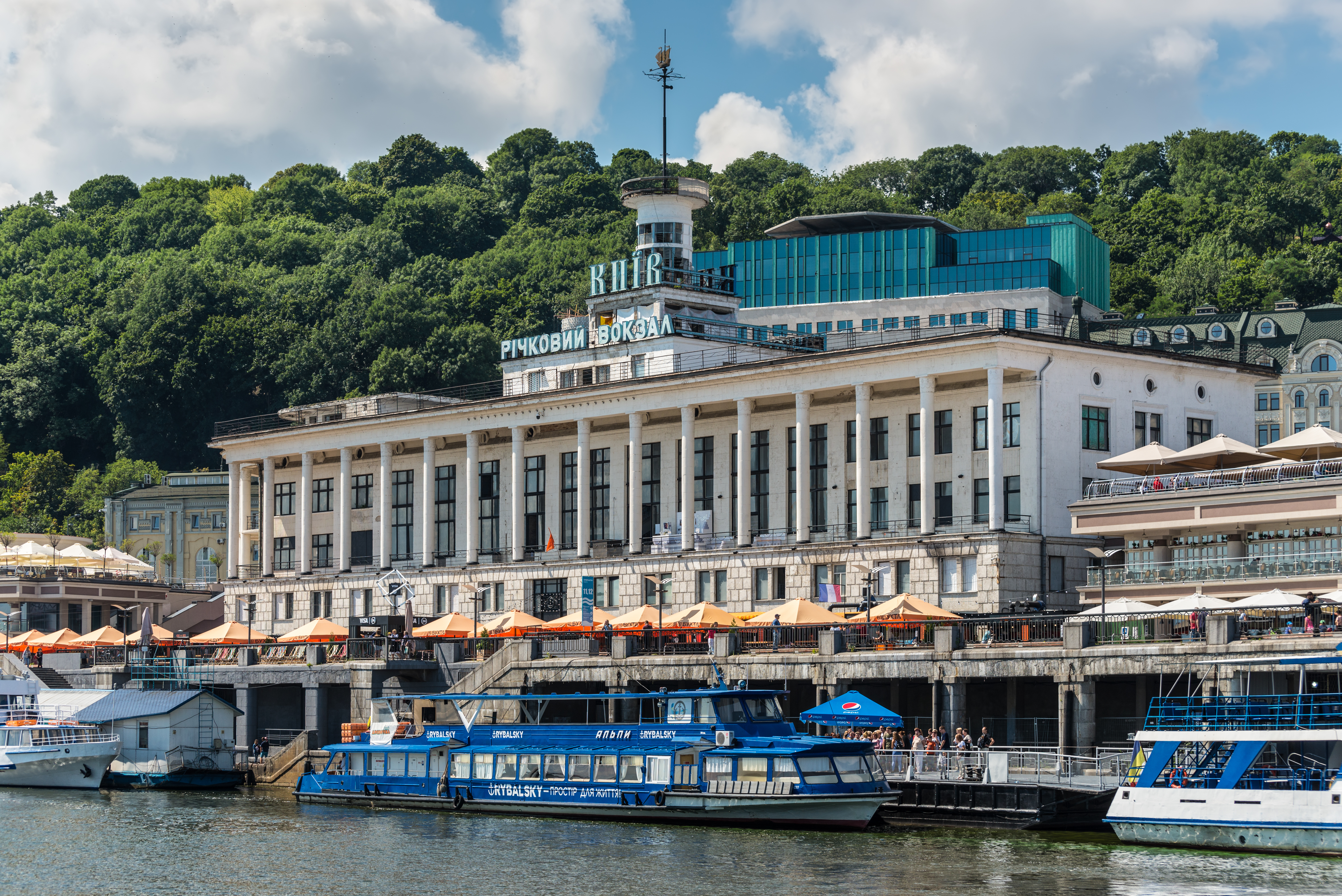
Kyiv River Station

The station was built in 1957–1961 on Postal Square according to the project of architects Vadym Hopkalo, Vadym Ladny, Hryhoriy Slutsky and others.

The building has four floors on the Dnieper side and two floors on the square side. In the central part of the building there is a round tower with special communication, alarm, and fairway equipment. On the first two floors there are administrative and economic services, a hall, storage rooms and other premises, on the third and fourth floors there is a post office, a restaurant, and a cafe.

Artists Ernest Kotkov, Velerii Lamakh, and Ivan Litovchenko decorated the interiors with mosaic compositions "Dnipro — the trade route," "Seagulls over the water," and others.

As of 2012, the station was closed for reconstruction. From 2012–2015, the building acquired an abandoned state.

In January 2016, after a change of owners, a major reconstruction of the station building began, which by May 2016 was to become a modern tourist center with a restaurant gallery, nightclubs, outdoor pool and more. According to the project, the usable area of the building increased from 6,000 m² to 11,700 m².

It has had the status of a newly discovered architectural monument since January 2016.

== Gallery ==
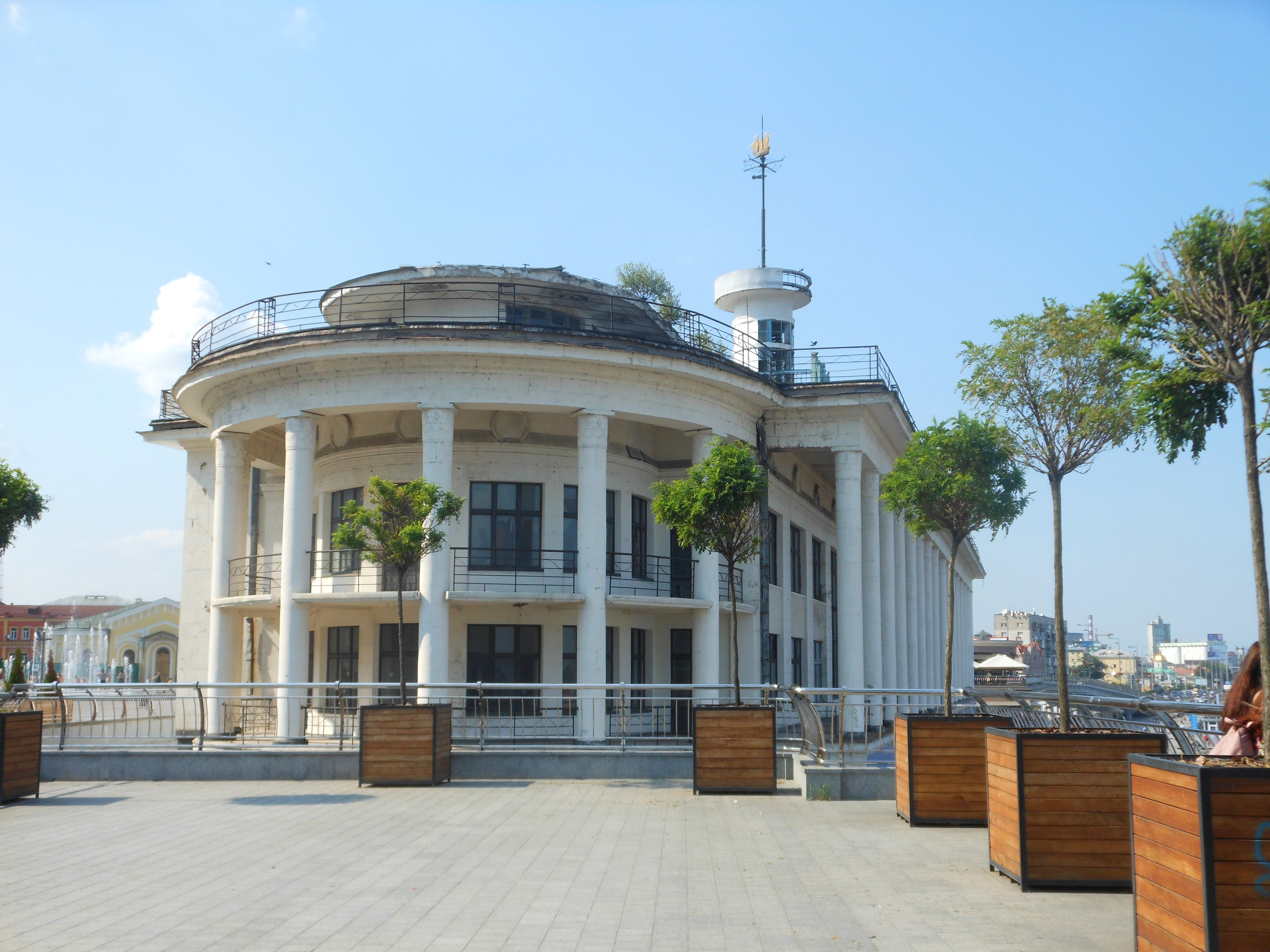
Kyiv River Station after the reconstruction of the Postal Square

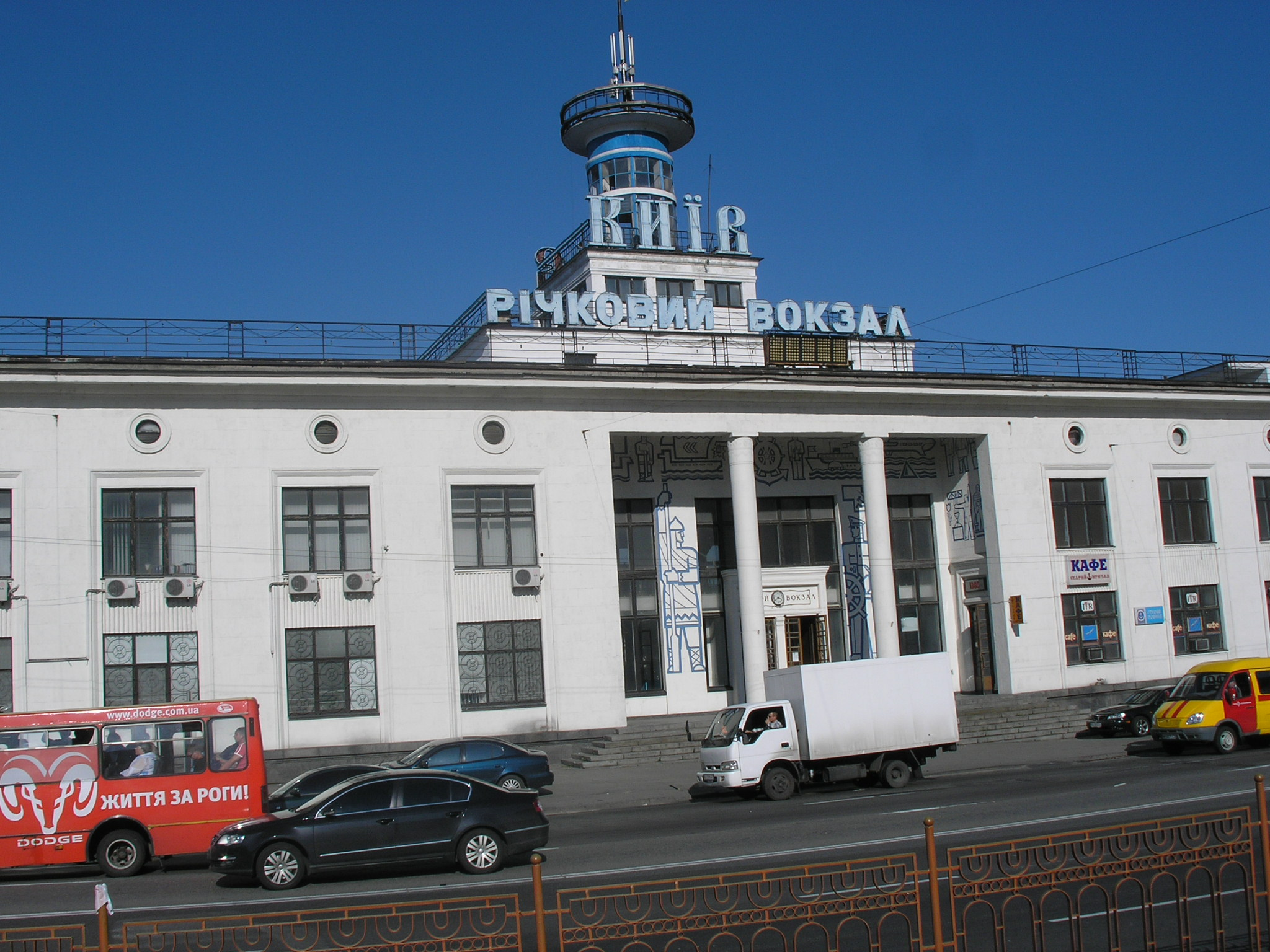
Kyiv River Station, 2007 (before the reconstruction of the Postal Square)

== See also ==
- Mosaics of Kyiv River Station
- Kyiv River Port
- Kyiv River Tram
