= Ivan Fedorovich Belka Otyaev =

Ivan Fedorovich Belka Otyaev (Russian: Иван Фёдорович Белка Отяев; second quarter of the 15th century — unknown) was the ambassador of tsar Ivan III in the Principality of Ryazan, the founder of the noble family of Belkin, the most likely founder of the village Belkin Repinskaya parish.

== Biography ==
Ivan Belka was the eldest son of Fyodor Dutka Otyaev. Served Ivan III. His great-great-grandfather Aleksei Petrovich Tail Bosovolkov, boyar of Simeon of Moscow and Ivan II of Moscow. In 1356 he was killed, and his descendants the Khvostovs went into the service of the appanage princes. He was sent to the embassy in Ryazan principality, which at the time maintained its independence.

He is the most probable founder of the village Belkin (now the village Belkino Borovsky District, Kaluga region). Most likely, the land ownership was granted to him by Ivan III. It is also possible that the land ownership has been obtained by him or his father Fyodor Dutka from Prince Michael Vereisky at the time was a member of Maloyaroslavets Vereisk inheritance.
