= Lebedyn cattle =

Breed of cattle

Lebedyn or Lebedin cattle (Ukrainian: Лeбeдинcькa, Lebedynska) are a cattle breed from Ukraine.

The breed was formed by crossing Ukrainian Grey cattle with Brown Swiss bulls. Recognised as a breed in 1950 they were first bred in the Sumy region and are now used in the Sumy, Chernihiv, and Kharkiv regions. American Brown Swiss bull have been used more recently to further improve the breed.

== Characteristics ==
Lebedin cattle are similar in appearance to Swiss Brown with individuals varying from almost grey to dark brown. The muzzle, forequarters and sides are a darker shade. Cows weigh 500 to 650 kg, mature bulls 850 to 950 kg. Cows are around 130 to 136 cm (54 in) tall. Butterfat levels are high averaging 3.76% with some cows giving over 5%.
