= Pivnichne, Sumy Oblast =

Rural locality in Zaporizhzhia Oblast, Ukraine

Pivnichne Північне
- Village
- Location of Pivnichne Pivnichne (Ukraine)
- Coordinates: 50°34′23″N 34°40′58″E
- Country: Ukraine
- Oblast: Sumy Oblast
- Raion: Sumy Raion
- Elevation: 179 m (587 ft)

Population (2001)
  - Total: 55
- Time zone: UTC+2
  - Summer (DST): UTC+3
- Postal code: 42250
- Area code: +380 5445

Pivnichne (Ukrainian: Північне) is a village in Sumy Raion, Sumy Oblast, Ukraine.

Until 18 July 2020, Pivnichne was located in Lebedyn Raion. The raion was abolished in July 2020, as part of the administrative reform of Ukraine, which reduced the number of raions of Sumy Oblast to five. The area of Lebedyn Raion was merged into Sumy Raion.
