= Lebedyn (air base) =

- IATA: none; ICAO: UKHN

Summary
- Airport type: Military/Abandoned
- Location: Lebedyn
- Elevation AMSL: 476 ft / 145 m
- Coordinates: 50°33′0″N 034°32′0″E
- Interactive map of Lebedyn

Runways
Direction	Length		Surface
Direction	ft	m	Surface
	8,202	2,500	Concrete

Lebedyn is a former air base in Ukraine located 5 km southeast of Lebedyn city in Sumy Oblast. It is a badly neglected 1960s-era airstrip, and was likely intended for wartime aircraft dispersals.
