= Pivnichne, Zaporizhzhia Oblast =

Rural locality in Zaporizhzhia Oblast, Ukraine

Pivnichne Північне
- Village
- Location of Pivnichne Pivnichne (Ukraine)
- Coordinates: 46°56′53″N 35°23′03″E
- Country: Ukraine
- Oblast: Zaporizhzhia Oblast
- Raion: Melitopol Raion
- Elevation: 64 m (210 ft)

Population (2001)
  - Total: 230
- Time zone: UTC+2
  - Summer (DST): UTC+3
- Postal code: 72333
- Area code: +380 6192

Pivnichne (Ukrainian: Північне) is a village in Melitopol Raion, Zaporizhzhia Oblast, southern Ukraine.

== History ==
The village of Pivnichne was founded in 1946. Until 1987, the village was subject to the Mirna village council. However, in 1987, Myrne received the status of an urban-type settlement, the Myrne settlement council was created in it, which includes only Myrne itself, and Pivnichne was transferred to the Terpinniv village council of the Melitopol district.
