= Lebedyn Raion =

Former subdivision of Sumy Oblast, Ukraine

Lebedyn Raion Лебединський район
- Raion
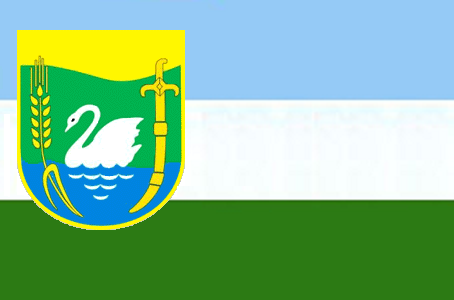
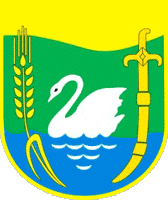
- Flag Coat of arms

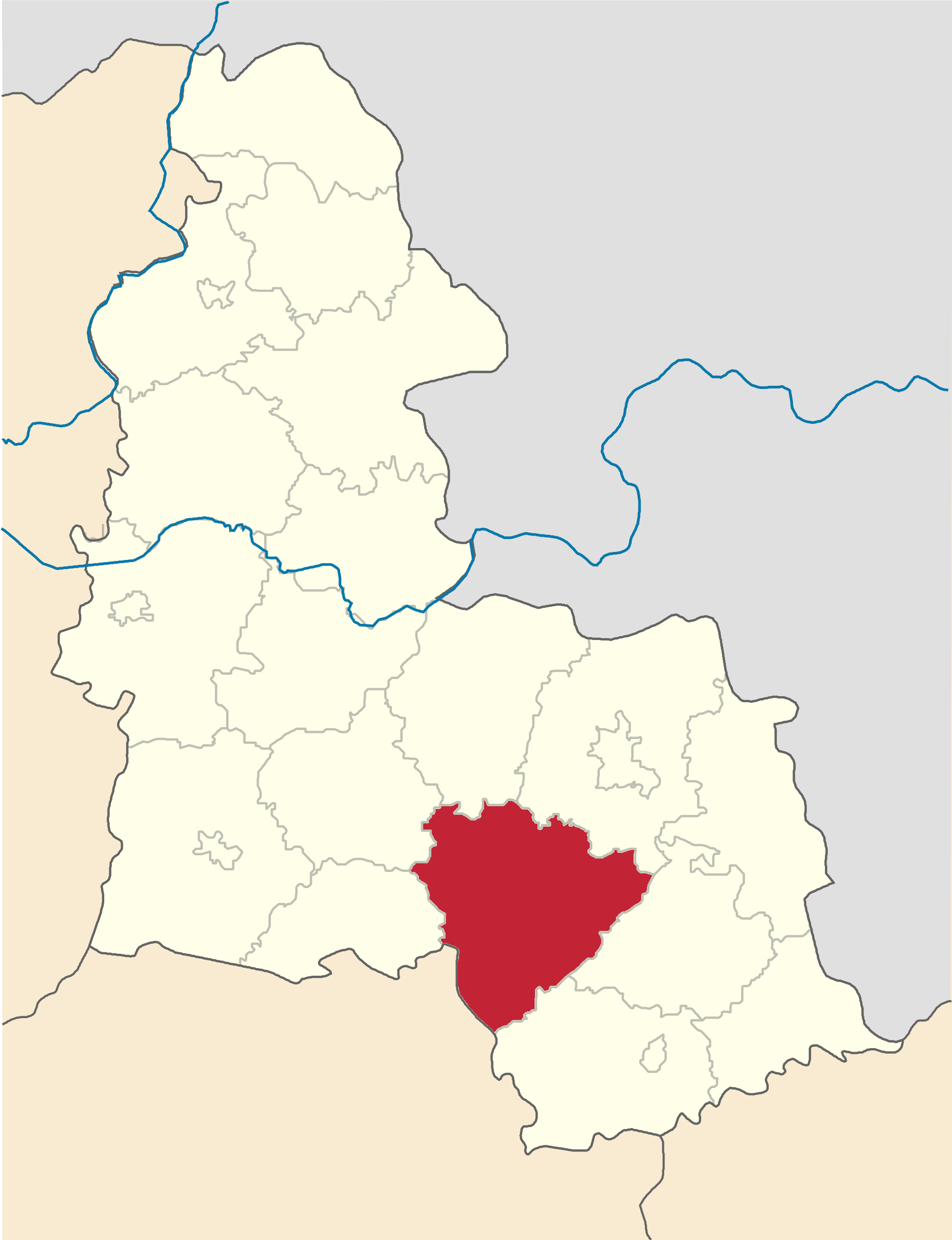
- Raion location in Sumy Oblast
- Coordinates: 50°38′21.1338″N 34°30′20.1342″E
- Country: Ukraine
- Oblast: Sumy Oblast
- Disestablished: 18 July 2020
- Admin. center: Lebedyn

Area
  - Total: 1,700 km^{2} (660 sq mi)

Population (2020)
  - Total: 18,510
  - Density: 11/km^{2} (28/sq mi)
- Time zone: UTC+2 (EET)
  - Summer (DST): UTC+3 (EEST)
- Website: http://lebedinrda.info/

Lebedyn Raion (Ukrainian: Лебединський район) was a raion in Sumy Oblast in Central Ukraine. The administrative center of the raion was the town of Lebedyn, which was administratively incorporated as a city of oblast significance and did not belong to the raion. The raion was abolished on 18 July 2020 as part of the administrative reform of Ukraine, which reduced the number of raions of Sumy Oblast to five. The last estimate of the raion population was 18,510 (2020 est.).
