= Lebedyn =

City in Sumy Oblast, Ukraine

Lebedyn Лебедин
- City
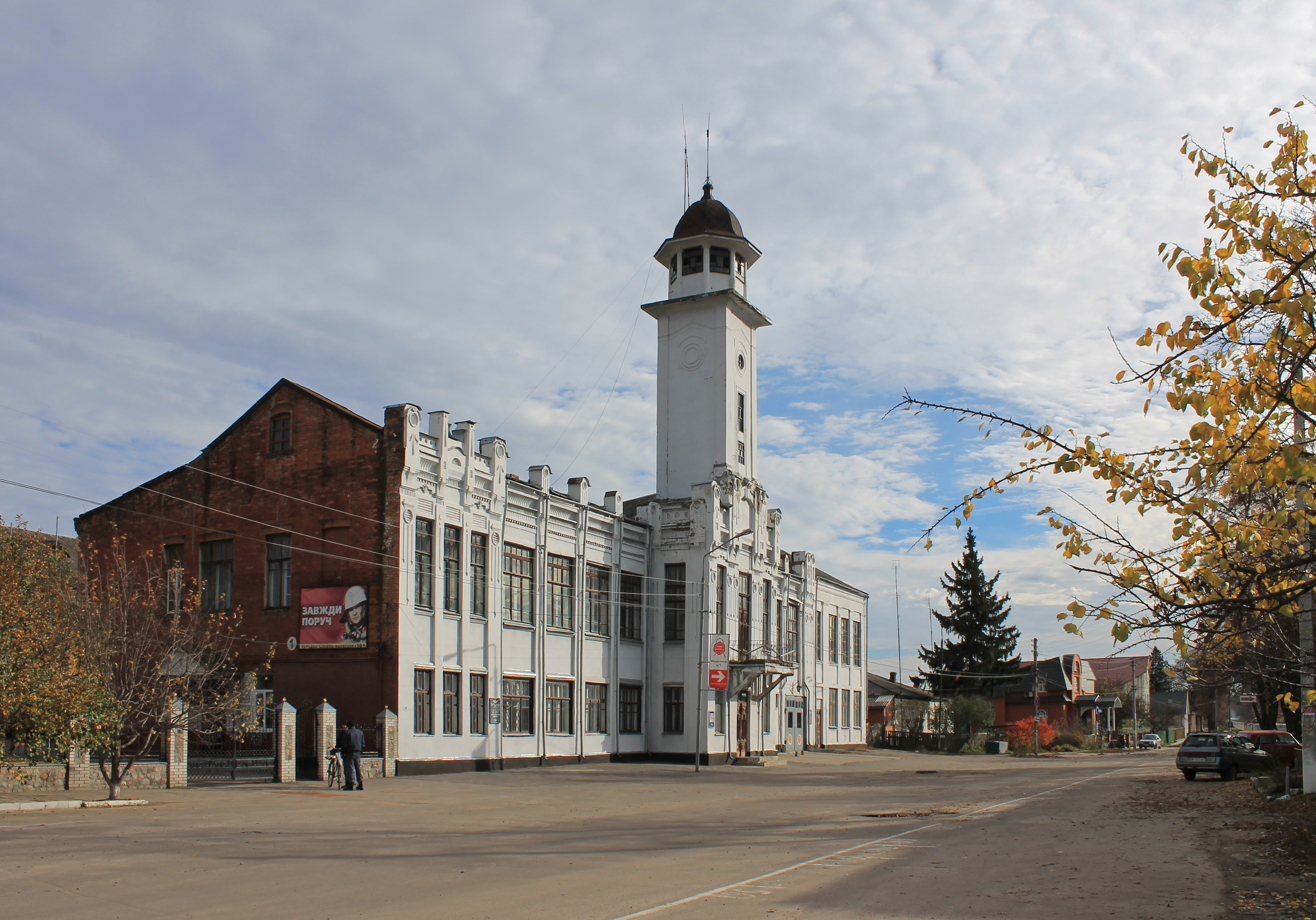
- Former Lebedyn City Council, built in 1913–1915

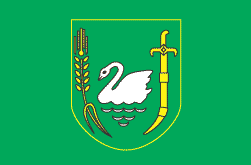
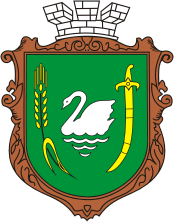
- Flag Seal

- Location within Sumy Oblast Location within Ukraine
- Coordinates: 50°34′59″N 34°28′56″E
- Country: Ukraine
- Oblast: Sumy Oblast
- Raion: Sumy Raion
- Hromada: Lebedyn urban hromada
- First mentioned: 1654

Population (2022)
  - Total: 23,892
- Website: http://lebedyn.com.ua/

Lebedyn (Ukrainian and Russian: Лебедин, Ukrainian pronunciation: [lebeˈdɪn]) is a city in Sumy Oblast, in north-eastern Ukraine. Lebedyn is located in Sumy Raion. Before July 2020, Lebedyn served as the administrative center of Lebedyn Raion; it was administratively incorporated as a city of oblast significance and did not belong to the raion. Population: 23,892 (2022 estimate). An air base is located nearby. The city also has a railway station.

== History ==
Lebedyn was built in 1653 as a small wooden fortress (ostrog) of the Tsardom of Russia. Lebedyn reportedly got its name from the nearby Lebedyn Lake.

In 1708, the settlement was a site of executions of Cossacks in Lebedin, in which supporters of Ivan Mazepa were mass executed on the orders of Peter the Great.

Since April 1780, it was the administrative centre of Lebedin uyezd in Kharkov Governorate of the Russian Empire The district had a territorial extent of 2723.1 versts, or around 1,805 miles, with Lebedyn its capitol.

In the 1897, census the town had a population of 14,301 (6,871 men, 7,430 women), while the District as a whole had a total of 178,144 (88,681 men, 89,463 women) inhabitants.

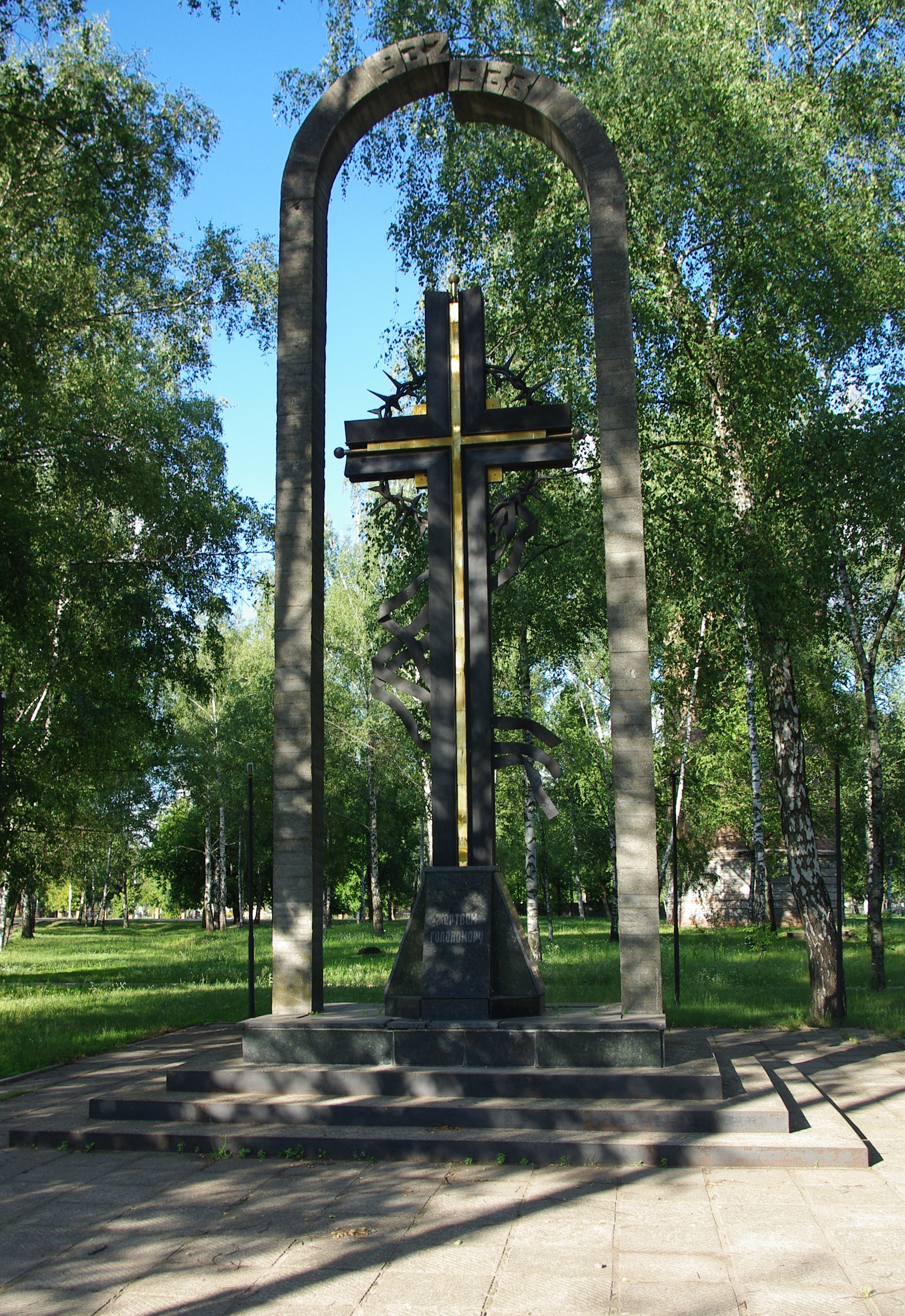
Memorial to the victims of Holodomor

During the Ukrainian War of Independence, from 1917 to 1920, it passed between various factions. Afterwards it was administratively part of the Kharkiv Governorate of Ukraine. Following the creation of the Lebedyn Raion on the 7 of March 1923, Lebedyn remained the capital of the new regional administration.

During World War II from October 11, 1941, to February 21, 1943, and from March 10 to August 19, 1943, Lebedyn was under German occupation.

In 1994, an oil plant was opened in Lebedyn.

On the 27 of February 2022, a series of clashes broke out in Lebedyn, with Ukrainian elements defending on the outskirts of Lebedyn at the town of Kamiane at 10:45 PM that day.

At around 7:30 AM, March 5, 2022, Russian forces launched an airstrike on infrastructure in Lebedyn. This included multiple private homes of civilians and cars, as well as gas stations. By 4 April Russian troops had withdrawn from the Sumy region.

By April 7, Sumy Oblast, including Lebedyn, regained its communications.

== Demographics ==
As of the 2001 Ukrainian census, the city had a population of 29,569 inhabitants. 93% of the population were ethnic Ukrainians, 7% belonged to a different ethnic group. The exact distribution of the population by their ethnic origins according to the census was as follows:

Ethnic groups in Lebedyn
	percent
Ukrainians	92.88%
Russians	6.21%
Belarusians	0.30%
others	0.61%

The linguistic composition of the population according to the 2001 census:

First languages in Lebedyn
	percent
Ukrainian	93.3%
Russian	6.5%
Belarusian	0.1%
others	0.1%

== Culture ==
Visitors are welcomed by the local history museum, the city art museum, three libraries, the city center of culture and leisure, a children's art school, a sports school, a house of children and youth creativity, a young technicians' station, and others. The Lebedyn Art Museum is a prominent center of spirituality and culture, standing at the origins of the revival of spiritual culture.

The city's amateur artists and individual performers strive to convey to the audience the beauty of folk songs and dances. A significant contribution to the promotion of national culture in Sumy region was made by members of the Lebedynska Pisnia amateur folk ensemble, the 43rd Missile Division Veterans Choir, the Bal and Arrow groups, the Veselka dance group, and the Sunflower dance group.

In Lebedyn, children also glorify their city by singing, and the amateur children's ensemble "Feyerii" accepts new students. The amateur folk vocal ensemble "Lebedynska Pisnia" is a source of inspiration for the realization of creative ideas. Iryna Kapusta, the head of the Sunflower dance group, creates dance compositions that are well known locally.

It has become a tradition in Lebedyn to hold the Ukrainian song festival "In the Name of a Glorious Fellow Countryman" dedicated to the 100th anniversary of B. R. Hmyrya's birth.

== Gallery ==
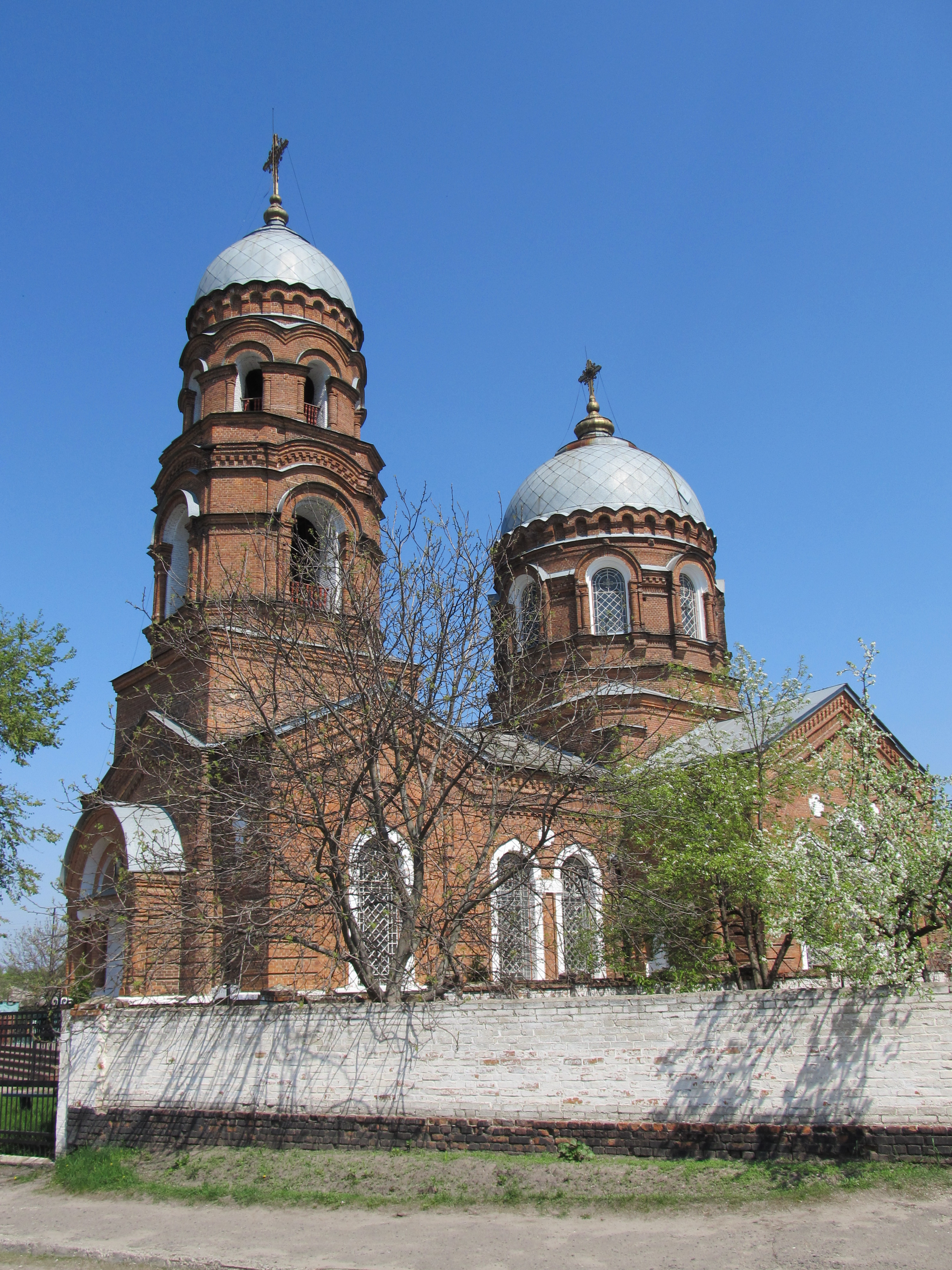
St. Nicholas Church

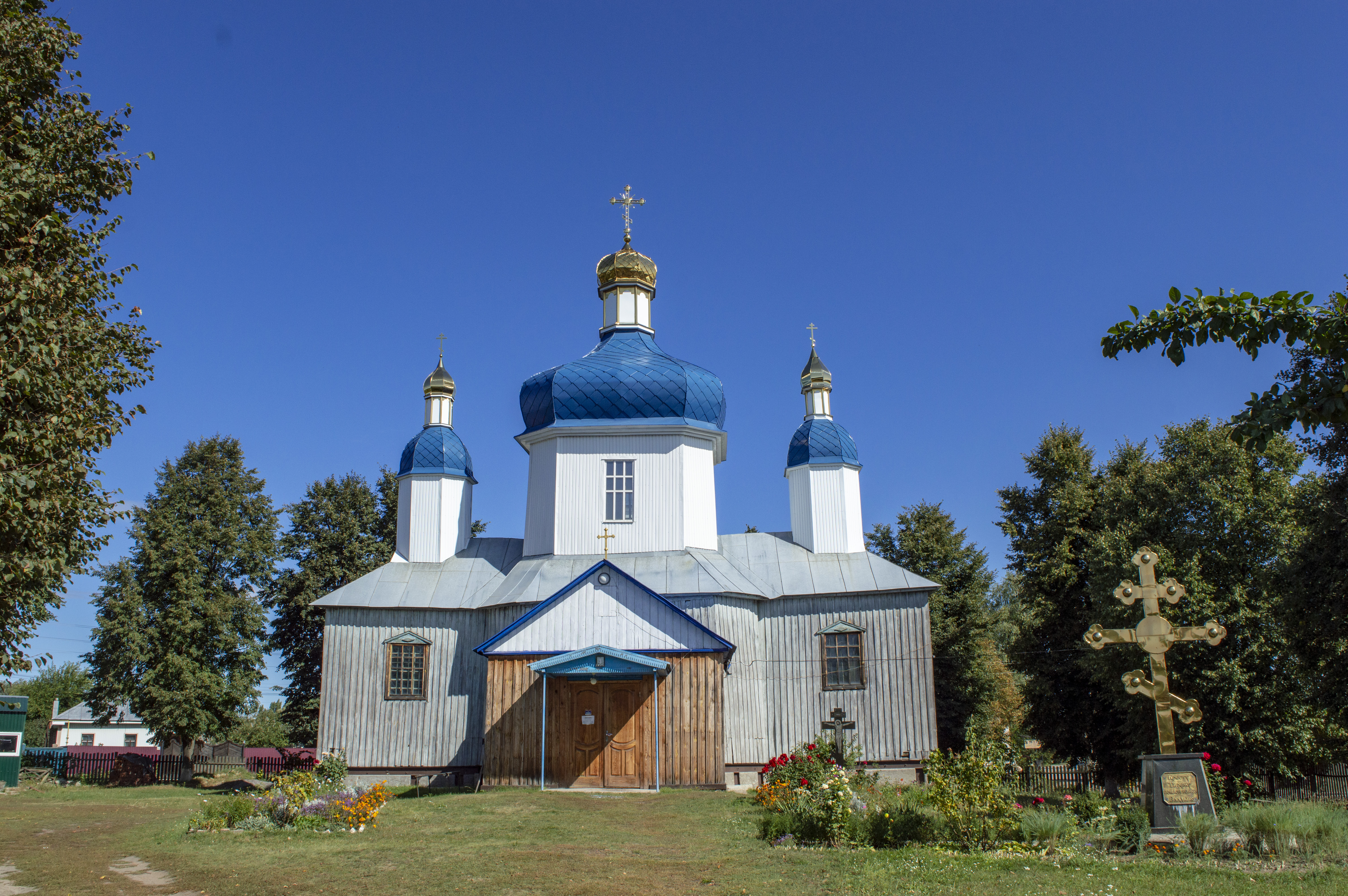
Resurrection Church

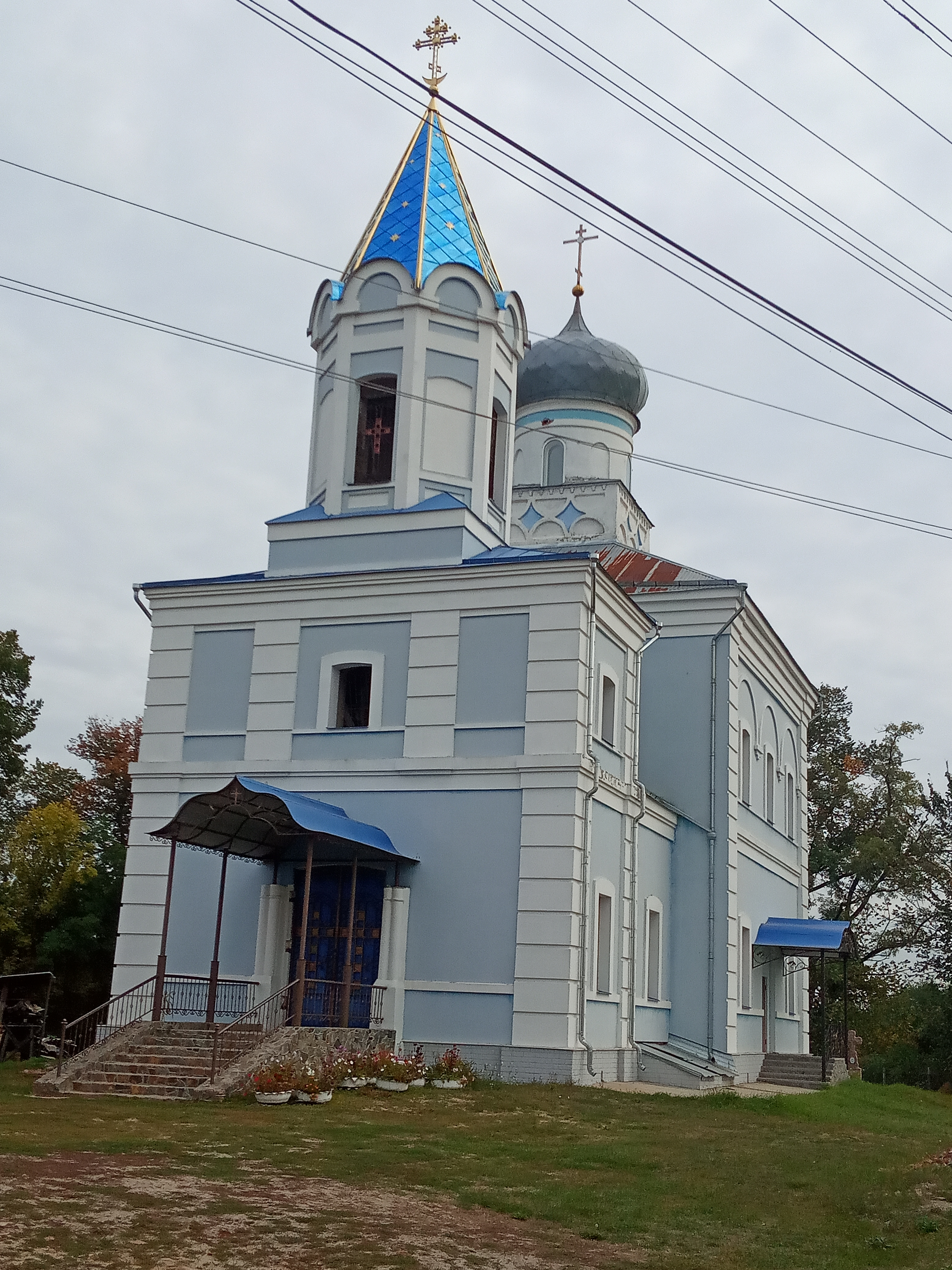
Intercession Church

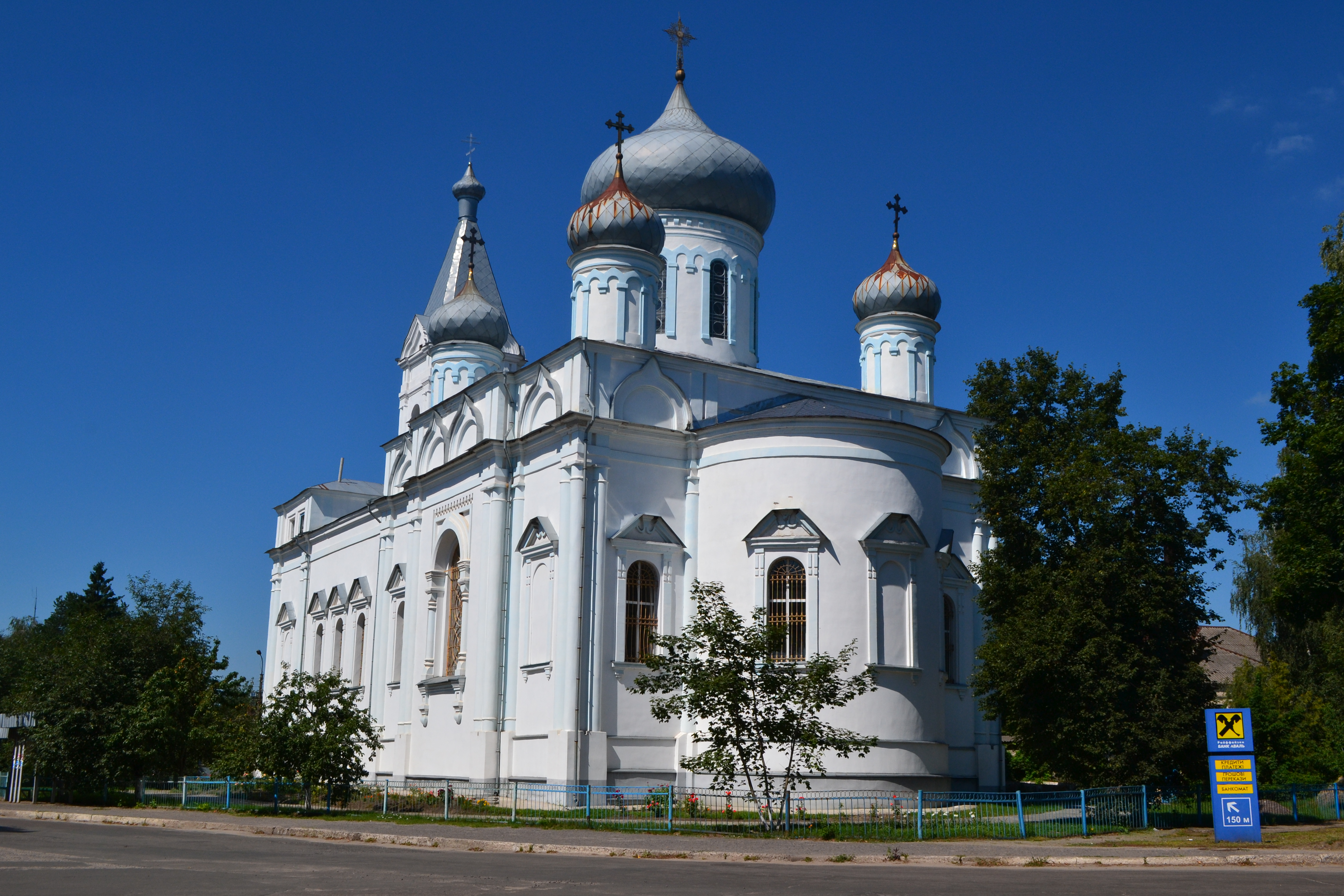
Ascension Church

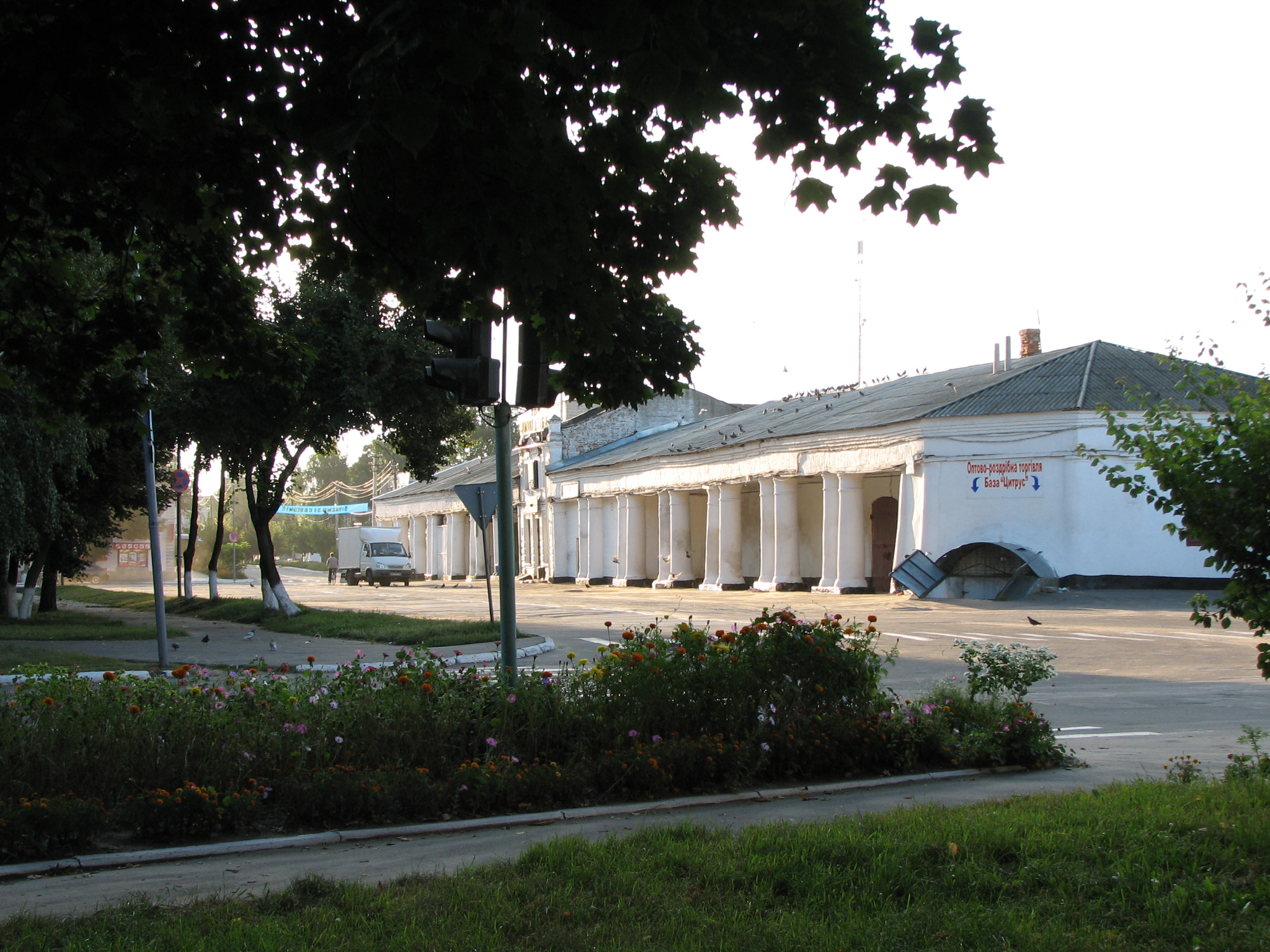
Old market

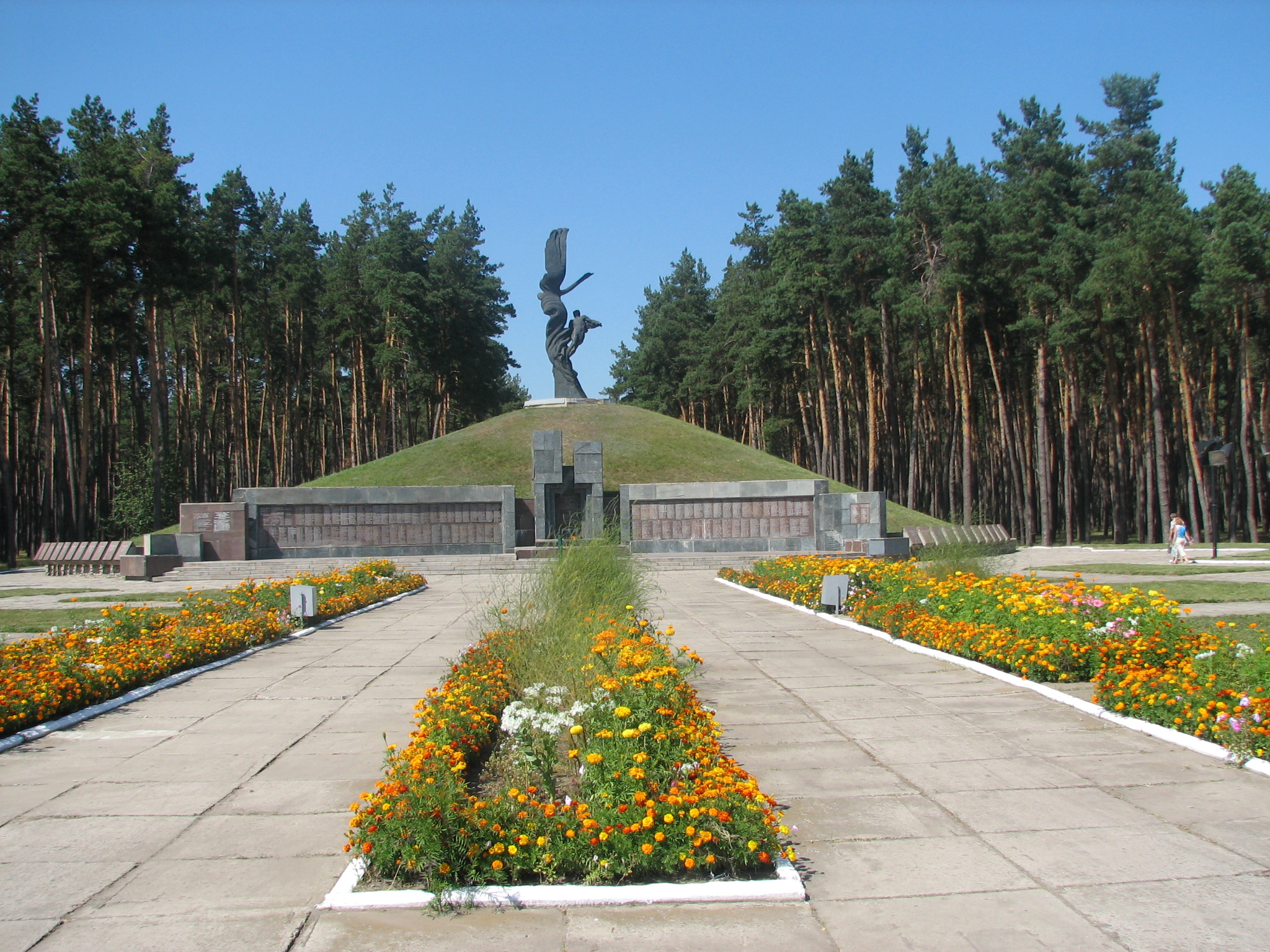
World War II memorial

== See also ==
- Lebedyn, Cherkasy Oblast
- Lebedyn strikes
