= Bilka, Sumy Oblast =

Village in Ukraine

Bilka Білка
- Village
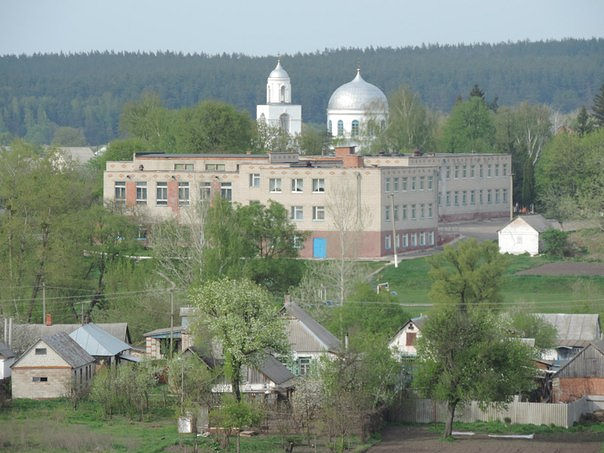

- Location within Sumy Oblast Location within Ukraine
- Coordinates: 50°31′45″N 34°54′19″E
- Country: Ukraine
- Oblast: Sumy Oblast
- Raion: Okhtyrka Raion

Population
  - Total: 1,199
- Time zone: UTC+2 (EET)
  - Summer (DST): UTC+3 (EEST)
- Postal Code: 42630

Bilka (Ukrainian: Білка), is a village in northern Ukraine, located in Okhtyrka Raion of Sumy Oblast.

== Geography ==
The Boromlya River (a tributary of the Vorskla River) runs through the village. The city of Trostianets is 3 km downstream from the village.

== History ==
During the Holodomor from 1932-1933, more than 300 villagers died from starvation:.

The village was briefly occupied by Russian forces in March 2022 during the Russian invasion and subsequent large-scale war. Ukrainians recaptured the village following Russia's retreat from northern and northeastern Ukraine.

== Demographics ==
In the 1864 census, the population was 2,933, and by 1897 the population has increased to 3,354.

According to the 2001 Ukrainian Census, the native language distribution is as follows

- Ukrainian: 96.83%
- Russian: 2.86%
- Others: 0.19%
