= Ukrainian Railways =

State-owned railway company in Ukraine

Ukrainian Railways Укрзалізниця/Ukrzaliznytsia
- Type: Public joint-stock company
- Industry: Railway transportation, Railway infrastructure, intermodal freight transport
- Founded: 1991
- Headquarters: 5 Jerzy Giedroyc Street, Kyiv, Ukraine, 03680
- Number of locations: 1,700 stations and halts
- Area served: Ukraine
- Key people: Oleksandr Pertsovskyi (CEO)
- Products: Rail transport services (passenger & cargo)
- Revenue: ▼ ₴ 66 billion (2025)
- Net income: ▼ -₴ 7.60 billion (2025)
- Total assets: ▲ ₴ 291.04 billion (2025)
- Total equity: ▼ ₴ 181.34 billion (2025)
- Owner: Government of Ukraine (100%)
- Number of employees: 169,000 (2026)
- Parent: Ministry of Infrastructure
- Divisions: 6 branches (Kyiv, Donetsk, Lviv, Odesa, Kharkiv, Dnipro)
- Website: Official website

Ukrainian Railways, or PAT 'Ukrzaliznytsia (UZ)' (Ukrainian: ПАТ "Укрзалізни́ця (УЗ)"), is a state-owned joint-stock company administering railway infrastructure and rail transport in Ukraine; a monopoly that controls the vast majority of the railroad transportation in the country. (Note: Except for intra-company industrial railways, local military railways and municipal Metro systems.) Ukrainian Railways is the world's sixth largest rail passenger transporter and world's seventh largest freight transporter. As of 2020, the total length of the main broad-gauge (1,520 mm (4 ft 11 27/32 in)) railroad network was 19,787 kilometres (12,295 mi), making it the 13th largest in the world. Ukraine also has many stretches of standard-gauge railway (1,435 mm), and is currently working to expand these in order to improve its connections to the European Union.

In 2015, Ukrainian Railways was transformed through a merger of a state agency and a state-owned enterprise into a public joint stock company owned by the state. Ukraine's State Administration of Railroad Transportation is subordinated to the Ministry of Infrastructure, (Note: Previously, before December 2010 cabinet reform – to the Ministry of Transportation and Communication.) administering the railways through the six territorial railway companies that immediately control and provide of all aspects of the railroad transportation and maintenance under the common Ukrzaliznytsia brand. The general director of the administration is appointed by the Cabinet of Ministers of Ukraine. The company employs more than 191,700 people throughout the country.

During the 2022 Russian invasion of Ukraine, Ukrainian Railways continued operating to evacuate and rescue millions of people from cities out of the country. The rail links between Ukraine and Russia have been blown up by the Armed Forces of Ukraine to prevent their use by Russians, but the railways have continued operating within Ukraine and between Ukraine and Poland, Hungary, Republic of Moldova, and Slovakia. One long-abandoned cross-border rail link with Poland was quickly reconstructed, and others which had been used only for freight have been quickly opened for passenger use. The rail service has evacuated over two million people from Ukraine on special evacuation trains. After some of the Black Sea ports became unavailable for grain export, rail became an export route to the rest of Europe. Several rail sections in the North and South became unusable.

== Company structure ==
=== Financial outlook ===
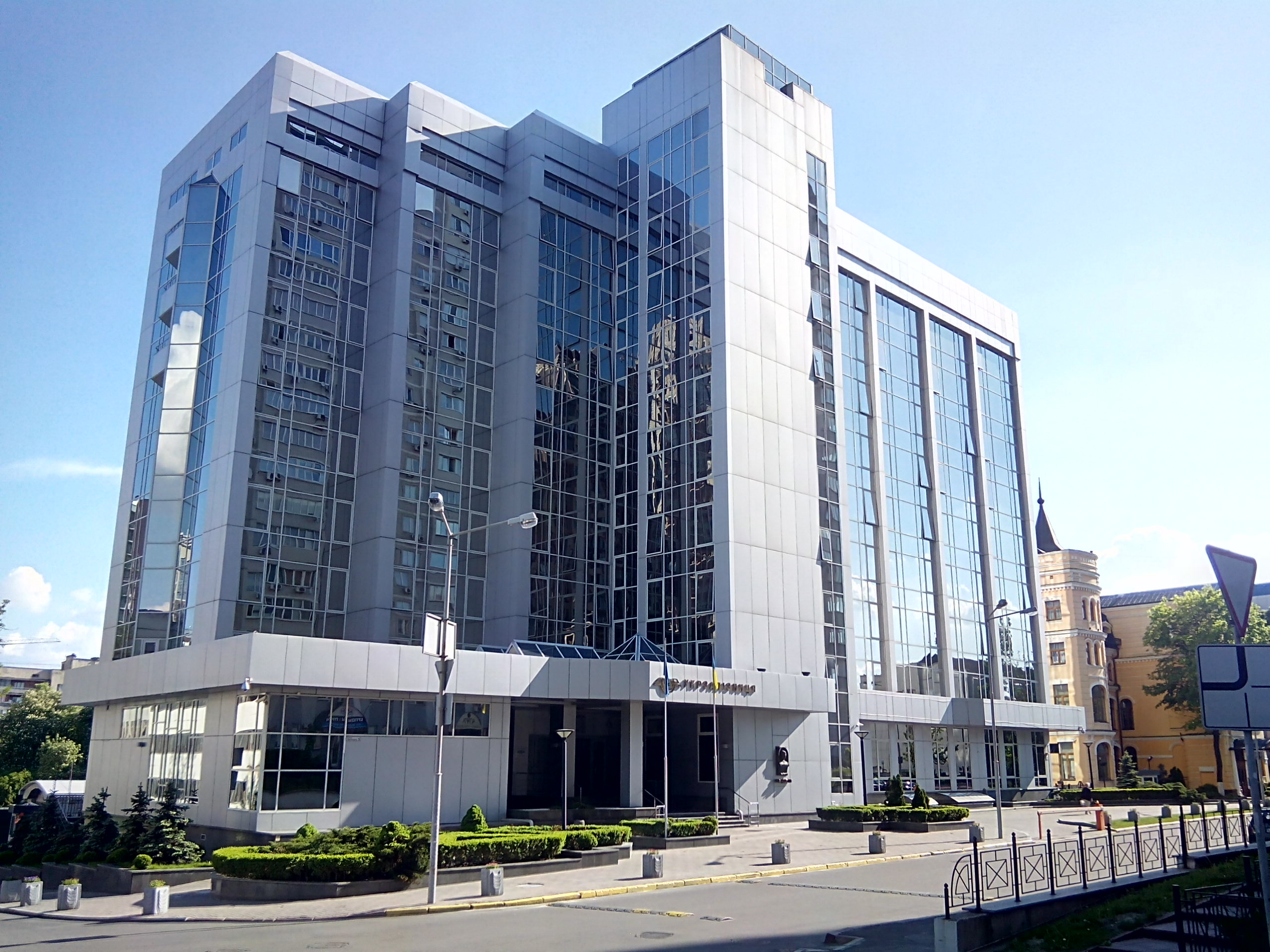
Headquarters of Ukrainian Railways, Pecherskyi District, Kyiv

As of 2026, Ukrainian Railways (UZ) faces a critical financial crisis, induced by significant asset losses and necessitated military use amidst the ongoing conflict. In the first quarter of 2026, the company reported a loss of 7.9 billion hryvnias. Since January 2026, the company holds a Restricted Default (RD) credit rating from Fitch Ratings, and a Selective Default (SD) from S&P Global Ratings due to the suspension of coupon payments on its debt obligations. UZ is currently in the process of restructuring negotiations to manage its significant debt. By the end of 2025, freight traffic had fallen by year-on-year 7.8 percent to 161.3 million tonnes, whilst revenue dropped by 19 percent. By the end of the first quarter of 2026, freight volumes had dropped further year-on-year to 34.8 million tonnes.

The railway serves a vital lifeline for the country, providing key services for passenger, freight and military use. The company is one of Ukraine's largest employers, with over 169,000 personnel as of 2026. Nonetheless, a twenty-seven percent reduction in staff (62,000 people) has been observed since 2022. In October 2022, it was reported that 263 railroad workers had been killed during the course of the war. At the beginning of 2026, it was reported that 1,030 employees of UZ had been killed, with another 2,923 wounded as a result of strikes.

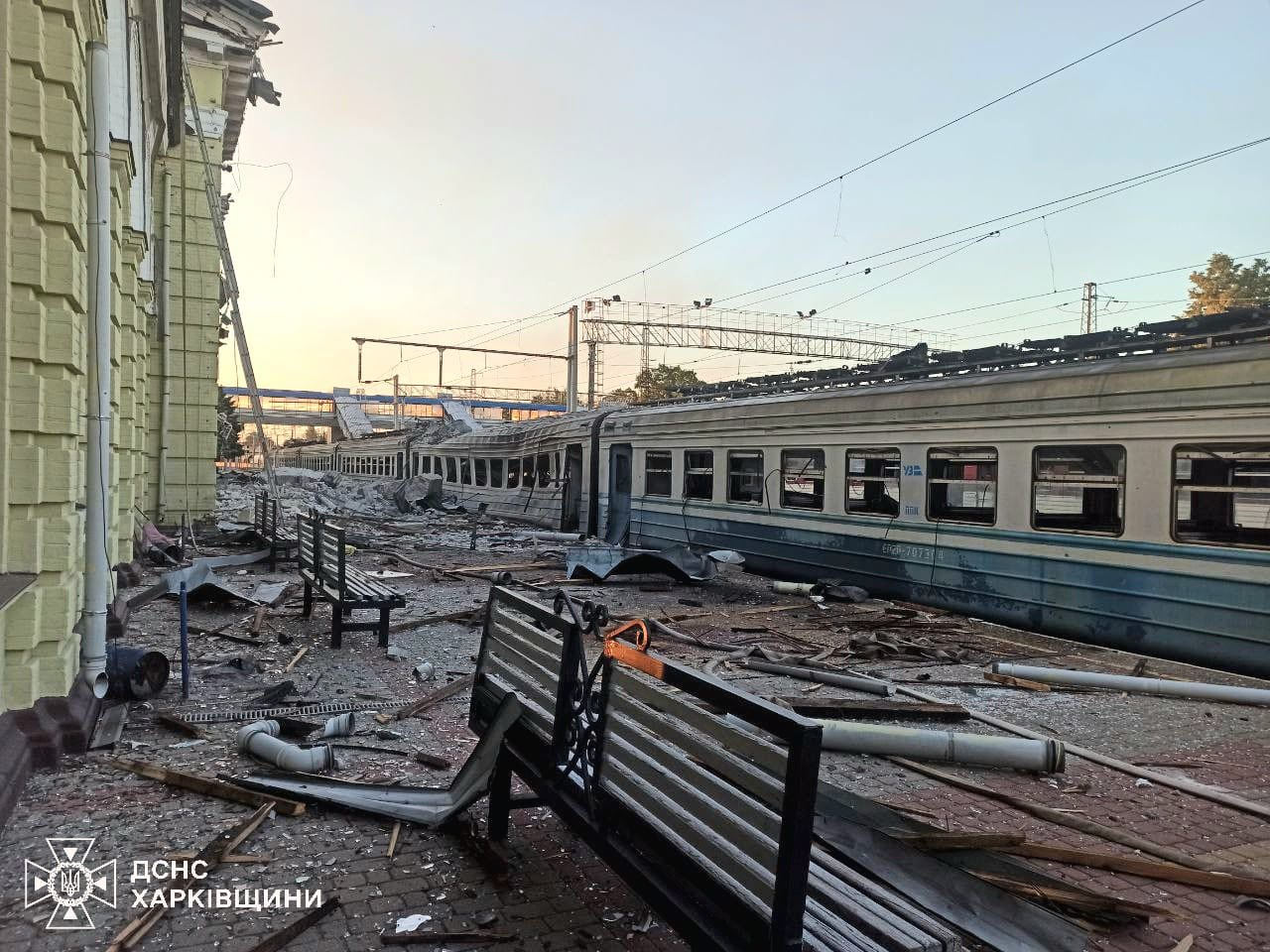
A destroyed train at Lozova-Pasazhyrskyi railway station

UZ has faced significant asset degradation as a result of the conflict. Assets such as rolling stock, railway stations and railway lines have faced increasing attacks, with incidents in 2025 exceeding the combined total of the previous two years. In late June 2026, CEO Oleksandr Pertsovskyi remarked that a "simply insane" surge in the number of strikes had occurred, with over 100 locomotives falling under attack since the start of the year. In early July 2026, it was further reported that over 200 locomotives had been destroyed or damaged since the start of the year.

Further economic factors affecting the company include rising inflation in the country, as well as protectionist measures from the European Union, such as the EU Carbon Border Adjustment Mechanism.

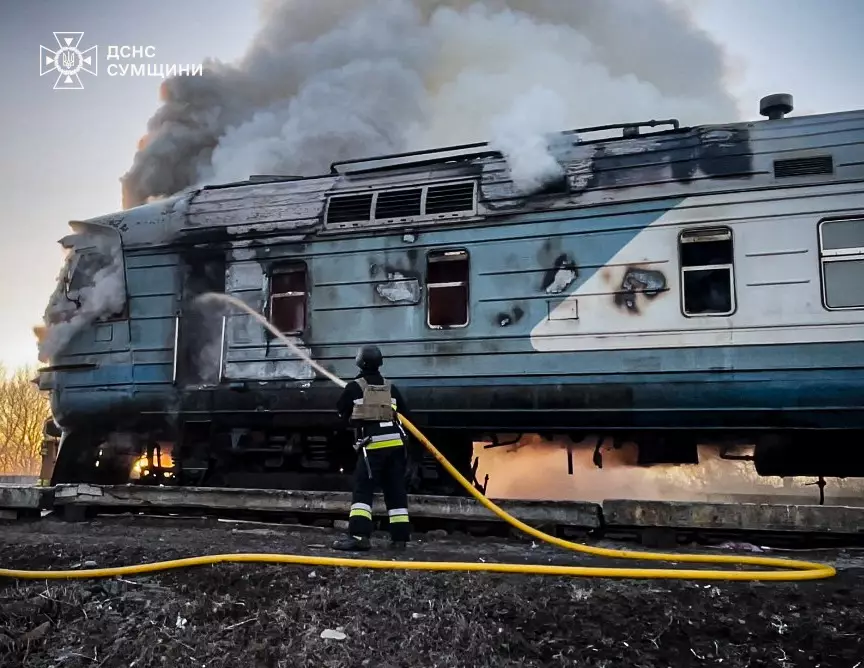
A destroyed locomotive in Sumy Oblast, March 2026.

Against a difficult financial situation, UZ plans to consolidate its rolling stock by removing older equipment through a scrap metal scheme, as well as increase revenue from the relatively profitable freight sector. UZ plans to increase tariffs on freight traffic by forty-five percent by January 2027, with a thirty percent rise to occur from August 2026. The increase in tariffs has received significant backlash from affected parties, stating that the move would result in the further reduction and shutdown of industrial facilities, amidst a period of significant inflation for the Ukrainian hryvnia, with industrial inflation as 40.2 percent as of April 2026. A letter from Ukrmetallurgprom states that increased tariffs would result in a decline in national GDP of nearly 100 billion hryvnia, with prominent facilities such as ArcelorMittal Kryvyi Rih having already partially shutdown due to a disruption in reliable industrial rail service.

=== Administrative structure ===
==== Railways ====
The six separate territorial railways each have their own directorates, located in the following cities:

No.	Name	Name in Ukrainian	Established	Network length	Managed from	Notes
1	Donetsk Railways	Донецька залізниця	1872 (Note: Built by the Russian Empire)	2927.6 km	Lyman	Significant sections of line in Russian control.
2	Lviv Railways	Львівська залізниця	1861 (Note: Built by the Austrian Empire)	4,521 km	Lviv	
3	Odesa Railways	Одеська залізниця	1865 (Note: Built by the Russian Empire)	4,000 km	Odesa	
4	Southern Railways	Південна залізниця	1869 (Note: Built by the Russian Empire)	3,000 km	Kharkiv	
5	Southwestern Railways	Південно-Західна залізниця	1870 (Note: Built by the Russian Empire)	4,668 km	Kyiv	
6	Cisdnieper Railway	Придніпровська залiзниця	1873 (Note: Built by the Russian Empire)	3,275 km	Dnipro	Significant sections of line in Russian control.

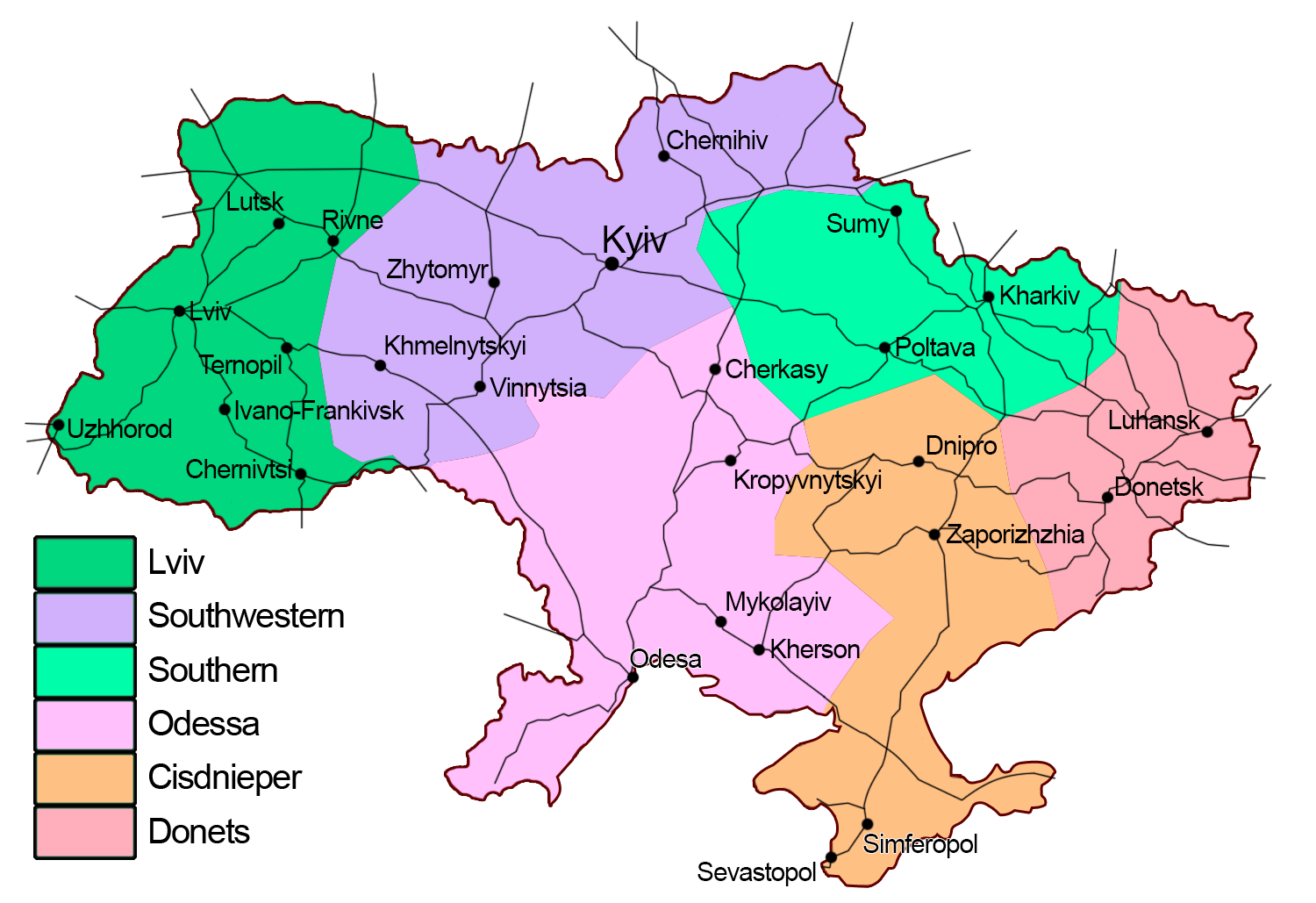
Subdivisions of Ukrainian Railways

==== Naming ====
With all operational lines constructed prior to Ukrainian Independence, the names of branches reflect the geography of the territories that originally built them; namely the Russian Empire and the Austro-Hungarian Empire. As a result, Southern Railways and Southwestern Railways are located in their respective directions in relation to Russia, but are located in the northeast and north of Ukraine. In 2024, it was reported that railway stations were being renamed to comply with Ukrainian derussificaion and decommunisation laws. In February 2025, the Commission of the Ukrainian Institute of National Memory claimed that "Southwestern" and "Southern Railways" names were propaganda for Russian imperial policy and thus violate Ukrainian law.

=== Enactment of the law "On Railway Transport of Ukraine" ===
The law seeks to harmonize Ukrainian rail-related legislation with European Union law. It sets out the basic requirements, responsibilities and rights of the infrastructure operator, the carrier and the owners of access tracks, rules for infrastructure management, basic requirements for railway rolling stock, and basic activities of railway rolling stock operators. The bill also provides for the creation of a system of public administration in the field of railway safety in accordance with the requirements of European Union legislation, the implementation of which is provided by the Association Agreement, which will increase transport safety in conditions of competition in the railway market. According to the Ministry of Infrastructure of Ukraine, the law, supported by European experts, serves as a starting point for real reforms in the industry.

=== Structural reform of Ukrainian Railways JSC ===
The company is to be separated into verticals in accordance with modern practices. This involves the creation of separate freight, passenger, production and infrastructure operators within Ukrainian Railways by the end of 2021. According to the Ministry of Infrastructure of Ukraine, the project will ensure the transparency of financial flows within the company, and improve the quality of management of each activity. This will allow Ukrainian Railways to prepare for the emergence of private competitors in the railway market.

=== Subsidiaries and partners ===
Ukrainian Railways owns or cooperates with several rail and train companies.

== Infrastructure ==
Railways in Ukraine use various gauge types. The broad gauge (1,520 mm), a legacy of Imperial Russian and Soviet times, dominates the landscape, and narrow-gauge railways (750 mm) also exist, but plans are being made to construct, restore or switch to more standard-gauge railways (1,435 mm) for better train connections with the rest of Europe. About half of railways in Ukraine are electrified (some of which have been damaged during the ongoing Russo-Ukrainian War and temporarily switched to diesel trains).

The total length of Ukrainian rails of all gauges was 28,000 kilometres at the end of 1997. Around January 2022, the length of railways in Ukraine was 19,790 km in broad-gauge 1520 mm (excluding those located in temporarily occupied territory), about 350 km in standard-gauge 1435 mm, and about 400 km in narrow gauge 750 mm.

== Rolling stock ==
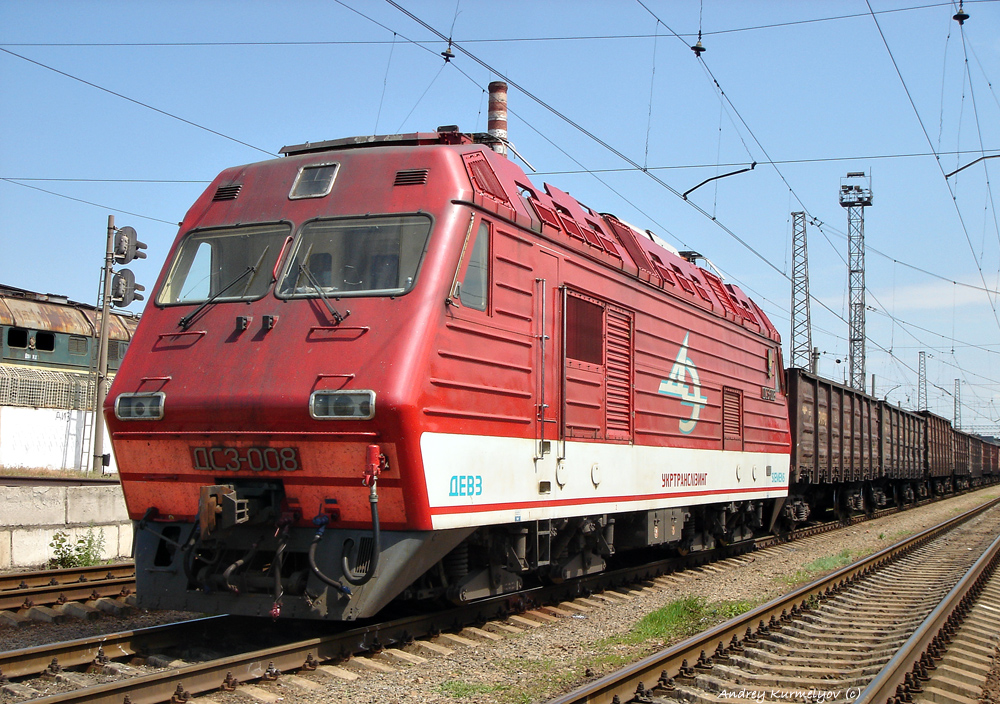
Ukrainian-made electric DS3 locomotive

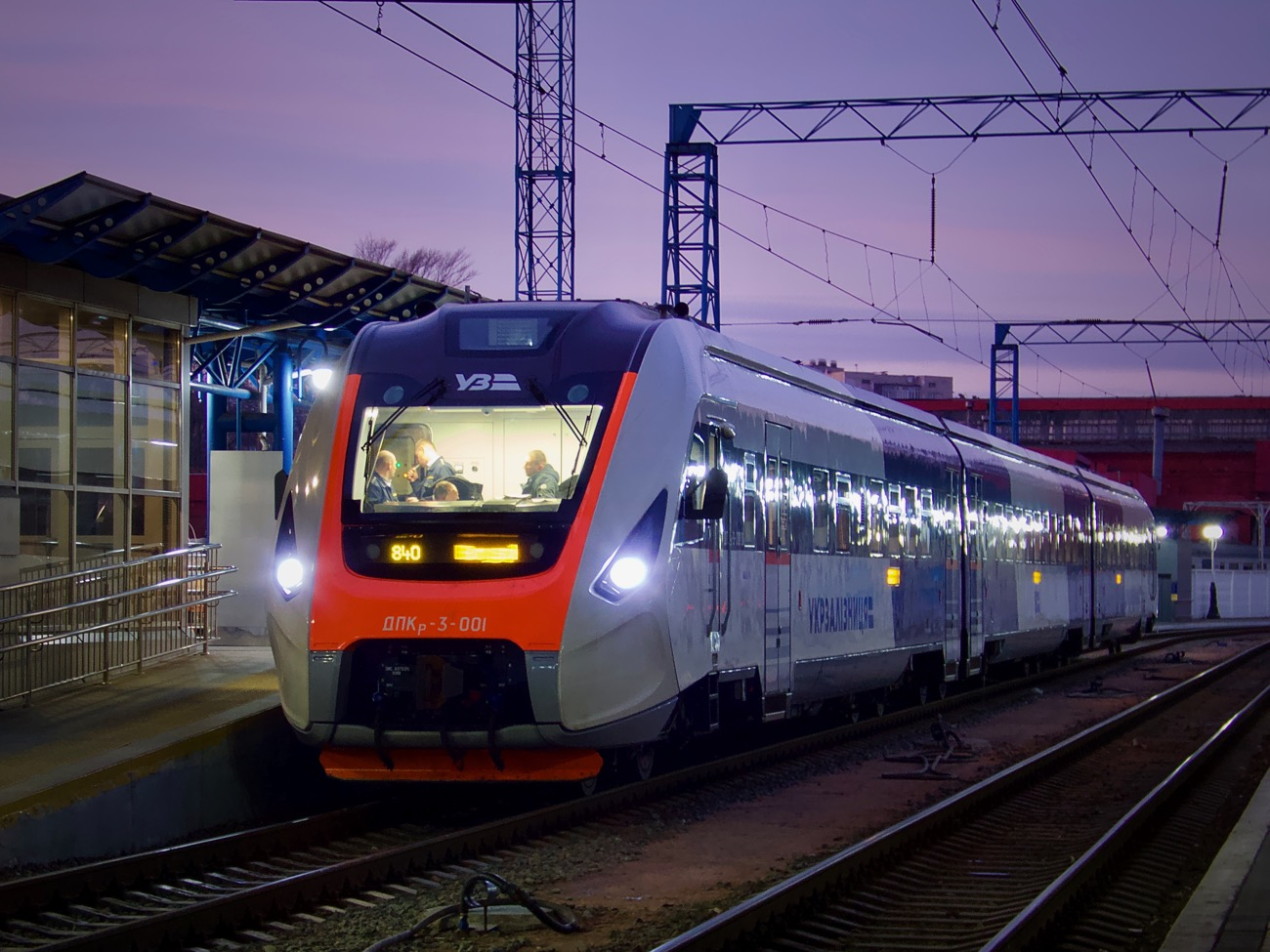
Ukrainian-made DPKr-3 Diesel Multiple Unit

Ukrzaliznytsia has several repair factories capable of producing locomotives and railcars. In addition there is a separate Kryukiv Railcar Engineering Factory and Dnieper Railcar Engineering that also produce railroad rolling stock for Ukrzaliznytsia and other companies for public transportation.

In November 2010, UZ agreed to buy 10 high-speed HRCS2 multiple unit interurban trainsets from Hyundai Rotem, with the prospect of a much larger order or joint venture for local production. The first two trains would be delivered in February 2012, two more in April and another two in May, when they will start operating. They will be rated as Inter City+ and will be connecting Kyiv with Kharkiv, Donetsk and Lviv, and at a later stage with Dnipro and Odesa.

In July 2011 UZ announced plans to buy 433 electric freight locomotives; 292 2EL4s from Transmashholding, and 141 locomotives (including class VL11M/6) from Elmavalmshenebeli (Tbilisi). Due to the 2014 Russian invasion of Ukraine Transmashholding was put on a sanctions list.

In December 2017, UZ and GE Transportation agreed a to strategic partnership for the implementation of a 7-year rolling stock renewal program including the delivery of 30 locomotives to Ukrzaliznytsia in September 2018 with 40% manufactured in Ukraine.

=== Locomotives ===
Image	Class	Type	Number	Manufacturer	Constructed	Notes
	2EL4	3 KV DC electric locomotive	6	Luhanskteplovoz	2009-2013	DC version of 2EL5
	2EL5	25 kV AC electric locomotive	20	Luhanskteplovoz	2005-	AC version of 2EL4
	2ES5K	25 kV AC electric locomotive	15	Novocherkassk Electric Locomotive Plant	2004	
	ChS2	3 kV DC electric locomotive	111	Škoda Works	1958-1976	
	ChS4	25kV AC electric locomotive	150	Škoda Works	1963-1972	
	ChS7	3 kV DC electric locomotive	27	Škoda Works	1983-1989	
	ChS8	25 kV AC electric locomotive	36	Škoda Works	1983–89	
	DE1	3 kV DC electric locomotive	40	NPO DEVZ	1997–2008	
	DS3	25 kV AC electric locomotive	16	GP NPK	2003–08	
	VL8	3 kV DC electric locomotive	~200	Novocherkassk Electric Locomotive Plant	1953–67	Several destroyed in the 2022 Russian invasion of Ukraine
	VL10	3 kV DC electric locomotive	~240	Novocherkassk Electric Locomotive Plant	1961–1989	
	VL11	3 kV DC electric locomotive	112	Tbilisi electric locomotive builder plant	1975-1978	
	VL40^{U}	25 kV AC electric locomotive	6	Zaporizhzhia Electric Locomotive Plant	2004	Double ended, single unit version of VL80
	VL60	25 kV AC electric locomotive		Novocherkassk Electric Locomotive Plant	1957-1967	
	VL80	25 kV AC electric locomotive		Novocherkassk Electric Locomotive Plant	1961-1995	
	VL82	3 kV DC + 25 kV AC electric locomotive		Novocherkassk Electric Locomotive Plant	1966-1979	Dual voltage version of VL80
	2TE116	Diesel-electric locomotive		Luhanskteplovoz	1971-2015	Twin units, sometimes operated as single units
	2ТЕ121	Diesel-electric locomotive	76	Luhanskteplovoz	1978-1992	
	M62	Diesel-electric locomotive		Luhanskteplovoz	1965-1990	
	2M62	Diesel-electric locomotive		Luhanskteplovoz	1976-1990	Twin unit version of M62
	TEP70	Diesel-electric locomotive		Kolomna Locomotive Works	1973	
	TEP150	Diesel-electric locomotive	4	Luhanskteplovoz	2005	
	TE33A	Diesel-electric locomotive	70	General Electric Transportation/JSC Lokomotiv	2019-	
	ChME3	Diesel-electric shunting locomotive		ČKD	1963-1994	
	TEM2	Diesel-electric shunting locomotive		Bryansk and Luhansk Locomotive Works	1967–1987	
	TEM18	Diesel-electric shunting locomotive		Bryansk and Luhansk Locomotive Works	1992-	
	TGK2	Diesel-hydraulic shunting locomotive		Kaluga Machine Building Plant	1960-2008	Preserved example pictured
	TGM4B	Diesel-hydraulic shunting locomotive		Lyudinovsky Locomotive Plant	1971-1989	
	TGM6	Diesel-hydraulic shunting locomotive		Lyudinovsky Diesel Locomotive Plant	1966-	
	TGM23	Diesel-hydraulic shunting locomotive		Murom Diesel Locomotive Plant	1960-	
	TU2	Diesel-electric locomotive	6	Kaluga Machine Building Plant	1955-1959	750 mm gauge. Used on narrow gauge lines.
	TU7	Diesel-hydraulic locomotive	1	Kambarka Engineering Works	1971	750 mm gauge. Used on Antonivka narrow gauge line.
	ER	Steam locomotive	2	Zegelsky Locomotive Works/Reșița Works	1951	Used for tourist excursion services
	L	Steam locomotive	1	Luhanskteplovoz	1953	Used for tourist excursion services
	SU	Steam locomotive	1	Krasnoye Sormovo Factory	1949	Used for tourist excursion services
	GR	Steam locomotive	1	Lokomotivbau Karl Marx Babelsberg	1951	750 mm gauge. Used for tourist services on Antonivka narrow gauge line.
	TE3	retired diesel locomotive	kolomna locomotive works/luhanskteplovoz/kharkiv locomotive factory	1953-1973	1,520 mm gauge	used to be running in ukrainian railways till 1996

=== Multiple units, railcars and diesel trains ===
Image	Class	Type	Number	Manufacturer	Constructed	Service
	Hyundai Rotem HRCS2	3kV DC/25 kV AC electric multiple unit	10	Hyundai Rotem	2011–2012	Intercity+
	EKr-1	3kV DC/25 kV AC electric multiple unit	2	Kryukiv Carriage Works	2011–2012	Intercity+
	Skoda EJ 675	3 kV DC/25 kV AC electric multiple unit	2	Škoda Transportation	2011–2012	Intercity+
	ED2T	3 kV DC electric multiple unit	3	Demikhovo	1998	Regional
	EPL2T	3 kV DC electric multiple unit	63	Luhanskteplovoz	2000-2008	Suburban
framele ss	EPL9T	25 kV AC electric multiple unit	77	Luhanskteplovoz	2001-2008	Suburban
	ER1	3 kV DC electric multiple unit		Rīgas Vagonbūves Rūpnīca	1957-1962	Suburban / Regional
	ER2	3 kV DC electric multiple unit	250+	Rīgas Vagonbūves Rūpnīca	1987-1996, 2000, 2003	Suburban / Regional
	ER9	25 kV AC electric multiple unit		Rīgas Vagonbūves Rūpnīca	1962-1964	Suburban / Regional
	ET2	3 kV DC electric multiple unit	1	Kryukiv Carriage Works	1995	Pivdena Railway
	D1	Diesel multiple unit	40+	Ganz Works	1964-1988	Suburban / Regional
	DR1	Diesel multiple unit		Rīgas Vagonbūves Rūpnīca	1963-2011	Suburban / Regional
	DEL-02	Diesel multiple unit	6	Luhanskteplovoz	2003-2012	Regional
	DPKr-2	Diesel multiple unit	1	Kryukiv Railway Car Building Works	2014	Regional
	DPKr-3	Diesel multiple unit	6	Kryukiv Railway Car Building Works	2019, 2021	Regional
	DPL1	Diesel train	6	Luhanskteplovoz	2007	Regional. Formed by half a 2M62 twin diesel locomotive and 2-4 carriages from an EPL2T or EPL9T electric train
	RA2	Diesel multiple unit	1	Metrowagonmash	2007	Regional
	Pesa 610m	Diesel multiple unit	1	Pesa Bydgoszcz	2004	Track inspection Used as a mobile command center following the 2022 Russian invasion of Ukraine.
	Pesa 620m	Diesel multiple unit	11	Pesa Bydgoszcz	2004–2013	Regional / Kyiv Boryspil Express
	Pesa 630m	Diesel multiple unit	2	Pesa Bydgoszcz	2013	Regional
	АS1А	Diesel railcar		Velykyluk Locomotive Repair Plant	1964-1980	Maintenance and track inspection
	AChO	Diesel railcar	1	Škoda Transportation	1977-1978	Track inspection. A second unit is stored.

=== Rolling stock renewal ===
==== Passenger cars ====
The draft state budget for 2021 includes the purchasing of 100 new passenger cars from the Kryukiv Railway Car Building Works. In 2021 Ukrzaliznytsia will also launch its first disabled-friendly trains with dedicated wheelchair space.

==== Locomotives ====
In 2018 Ukrainian Railways purchased 30 General Electric TE33AC Trident freight diesel locomotives. The 30 locomotives were planned to be the first stage of wider cooperation, including a 15-year partnership, and the replacement and modernization of additional Ukrainian rolling stock. Later in 2020, Ukrainian Railways CEO Volodymyr Zhmak stated that he does not see the need for further GE diesel locomotives, as the company will focus on electric traction due to its higher efficiency.

Following the appointment of Volodymyr Zhmak as CEO, ₴400 million was reallocated within the company for urgent locomotive repairs until the end of 2020. As a part of this measure, the Lviv Locomotive Repair Plant has already received an order for the repair of 6 electric locomotives until the end of 2020.

In 2021, ₴4.7 billion is planned to be spent on repairing the existing locomotive fleet.

As of 2020, Alstom is interested in the renewal of the Ukrainian Railways locomotive fleet through partial localization of production. Volodymyr Zhmak stated that Ukrainian Railways is initially interested in the purchase of 50 two-system electric freight locomotives. The purchase of Alstom locomotives would be financed by the French government.

=== Statistics ===
Key figures as of 2020:

- Main track (1,520 mm) running length: 19,787 km
  - Electrified track: 9,319 km
- Number of railway stations: 1,402
- Number of freight (goods) wagons: 85,200
- Number of passenger cars: 3,883 (in active operation - 2,681)
- Number of locomotives: 1,944
  - Number of electric locomotives: 1,627
  - Number of diesel locomotives: 301
- Average number of employees: 266,300 people
- Passengers carried (2019): 149.6 million
- Cargo transportation (2019): 312.4 million tonnes

== Classification of passenger trains (railway lines) ==
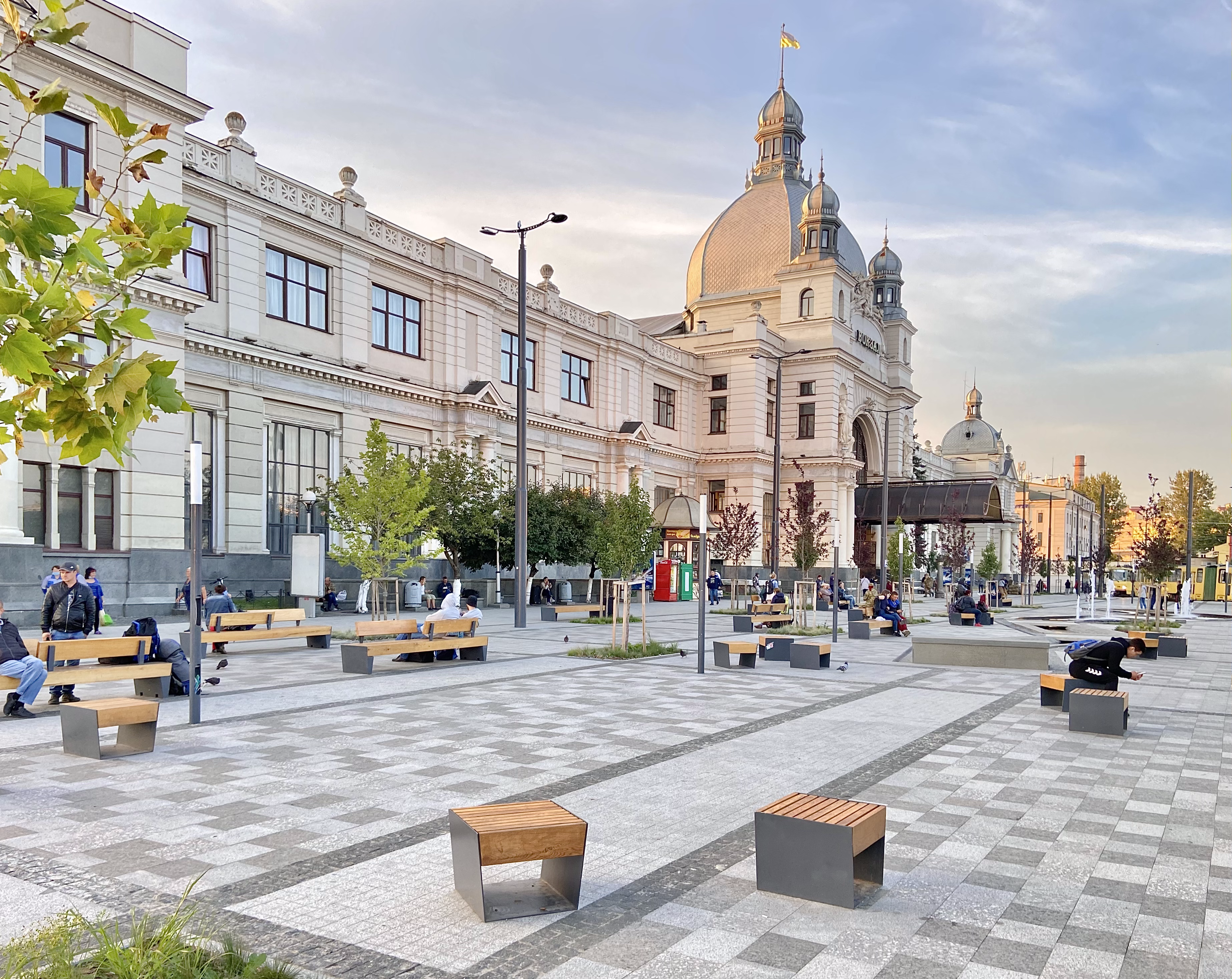
Train station in Lviv

On 27 April 2011 in accordance with order No. 504/2011 rail industry specialists developed a new classification system of passenger trains for Ukrainian Railways.

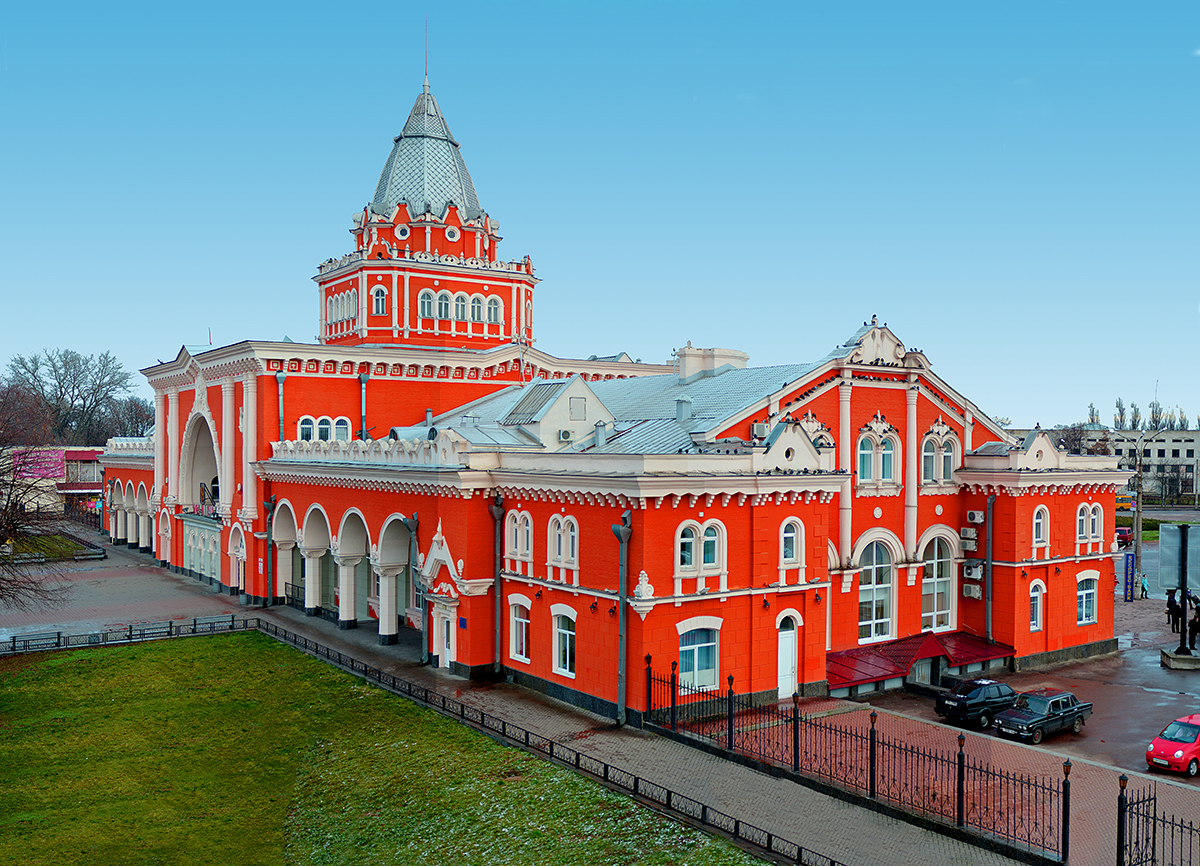
Chernihiv station building and platforms

The development of a new classification system for passenger trains in Ukraine was made necessary by the need to inform customers (passengers) about the level of service quality they could expect to find in various passenger trains. The new system is based on the class of train and carriages.

Given the quality of the service provided UZ asked the following classes of passenger trains:

- Daytime passenger lines:
  - Euro City (EC) – Express (min. 90 km/h) daytime services on international routes which should offer a very high level of service and comfort. First and standard classes.
  - Inter City+ (IC+) – Express (min. 90 km/h) daytime services on domestic routes which should offer a very high level of service and comfort. First and standard classes. These services are currently operated by Hyundai Rotem HRCS2 multiple unit trains on routes between Kyiv and Kharkiv, Lviv, Dnipro, Zaporizhzhia, Pokrovsk, Kryvyi Rih, Kostiantynivka, Odesa, Ternopil, Kropyvnytskyi. Besides, there is one international express Kyiv - Przemyśl (Poland).
  - Inter City (IC) – (max. 70 km/h – 90 km/h) daytime services on domestic routes which should offer a heightened level of service and comfort. First, standard and economy classes. These services are currently operated by Škoda UZ class 675 trains on routes between Kharkiv, Dnipro and Donetsk.
  - Regional Express (РЕ) – (max. 70 km/h – 90 km/h) daytime services on domestic routes which should offer a standard level of service and comfort. First, standard and economy classes.
  - Regional train (РП) – (max. 70 km/h) daytime services on domestic routes which should offer a standard level of service and comfort. Standard and economy classes.
- Nighttime passenger trains:
  - Euro Night (EN) – Express (min. 90 km/h) nighttime services on international routes which should offer a very high level of service and comfort. 2 berth coupe and 4 berth coupe classes.
  - Night Express (НЕ) (max. 70 km/h – 90 km/h) nighttime services on international and domestic routes which should offer a heightened level of service and comfort. 2 berth coupe, 4 berth coupe and platskarta classes.
  - Night fast (НШ) – (max. 50 km/h – 70 km/h) nighttime services on international and domestic routes which should offer a heightened level of service and comfort. 2 berth coupe, 4 berth coupe and platskarta classes.
  - Night passenger (НП) (max. 50 km/h) nighttime services on international and domestic routes which should offer a heightened level of service and comfort. 4 berth coupe and platskarta classes.

The advantages of the new classification system include full compliance with the classification of the European Union, compliance with Ukrainian and English names and abbreviations, linguistic and semantic consistency and clarity for customers in Ukraine and compatibility with existing and future tariff policy. The system is also not far displaced from the previous classification system used for passenger trains on the territory of Ukraine.

== Science and education ==
Railway Transport of Ukraine Залізничний транспорт України Zaliznychnyi transport Ukrainy
- Discipline: Railway engineering
- Language: Original language
- Edited by: Serhiy Vitaliyovych Myamlin

Publication details
- History: 1996–present
- Publisher: Rail Transport Scientific and Engineering Institute (branch of JSC Ukrzaliznytsia) (Ukraine)
- Frequency: Quarterly
- Open access: Yes
- ISO 4: Find out here

Indexing
- ISSN: 2311-4061

Links
- Journal homepage

The R&D branch of Ukrainian Railways is the Research and Design and Technological Institute of Railway Transport (NDKTI), which conducts scientific and technological research, development, engineering and design for infrastructure, rolling stock, security, telecommunications and so forth. It publishes a quarterly journal, Railway Transport of Ukraine, where the latest insights and results of experiments are shared within the community of engineers, scientists and railway workers of Ukraine.

The National Railway University in Dnipro currently has 10 faculties as well as a technical school, a business school and branches in Odesa and Lviv, 450 professors and 39 separate fields of study related to railway transport.

== Directors ==
Ukrainian Railways' previous logo, used from 1998 to 2018

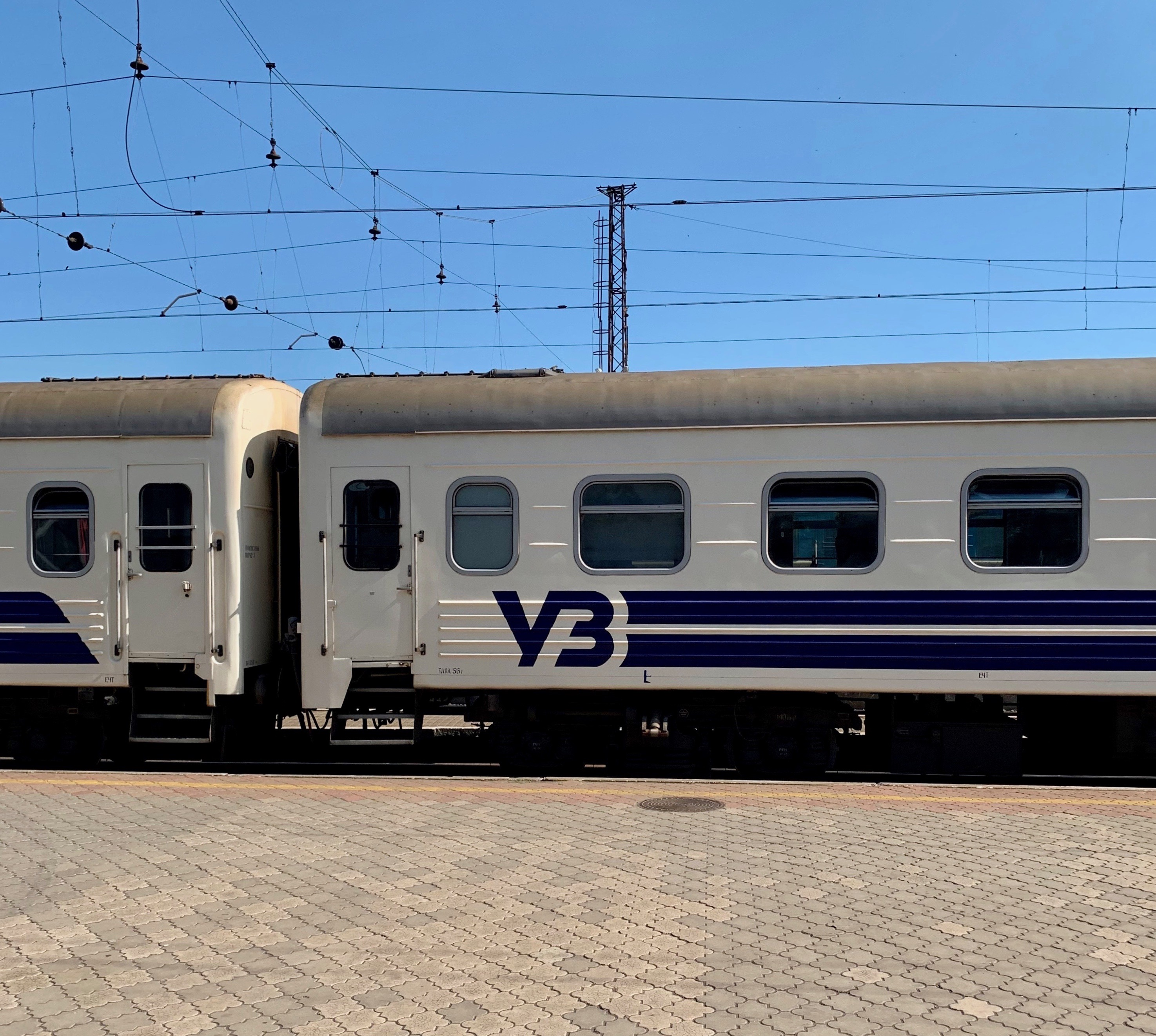
Ukrainian Railways' new logo on the train wagon

=== President ===
- 1991–1993 Borys Oliynyk

General director

- 1993–1997 Leonid Zheleznyak
- 1997–2000 Anatoliy Slobodyan
- 2000–2004 Heorhiy Kirpa
- 2005–2005 Volodymyr Korniyenko
- 2005–2005 Zenko Aftanaziv
- 2005–2006 Vasyl Hladkikh
- 2006–2007 Volodymyr Kozak
- 2007–2007 Petro Naumenko
- 2007–2008 Vasyl Melnychuk
- 2008–2011 Mykhailo Kostiuk
- 2011–2012 Volodymyr Kozak
- 2013–2014 Serhiy Bolobolin
- 2014–2014 Borys Ostapyuk
- 2014–2015 Maksym Blank (acting)
- 2015–2015 Oleksandr Zavhorodniy (acting)

=== Board director ===
- 2015–2016 Oleksandr Zavhorodniy (acting)
- 2016–2016 Yevhen Kravtsov (acting)
- 2016–2016 Vitaliy Zhurakovskyi (acting)
- 2016–2017 Wojciech Balczun
- 2017–2020 Yevhen Kravtsov (acting)
- 2020 Marček Zhelko (acting)
- 2020 Ivan Yuryk (acting)
- 2020–2021 Volodymyr Zhmak
- 2021–2023 Oleksandr Kamyshin
- 2023–November 2024 Yevhen Liashchenko
- Yuzef Leonidovych Tuley (Authority: to act in the name of the legal entity, including signing of the agreements etc., (until 31 March 2025)) – representative

== Social initiatives ==
=== Iron Land ===
In June 2023, the Iron Land children’s area, created jointly by UNICEF and JSC ‘Ukrzaliznytsia’, was opened at Kyiv Central Railway Station. Covering an area of over 700 m², the space is designed for leisure, relaxation and the development of children and families travelling by rail.

Iron Land comprises sports and play areas, a library, a games room, a science and education area featuring railway exhibits, and a miniature model of the ‘Tarpan’ high-speed train. There are also waiting areas, baby care facilities and mobile device charging points for visitors. Entertainers, psychologists and medical staff are on hand at the venue.

Similar children’s areas are also in operation at the railway stations in Kharkiv and Lviv.

=== The ‘Granatomed’ project ===
In November 2025, Ukrzaliznytsia joined the ‘Granatomed’ charity project, launched by the ‘Come Back Alive’ Foundation. The project was aimed at raising funds to purchase automatic grenade launchers and mortars for units of the Ukrainian Defence Forces.

As part of the project, the partners, in collaboration with Gemini, have launched ‘Granatomed’ tea, with a pomegranate flavour and honey marmalade. Thanks to the sale of tea and marmalade on long-distance trains between November 2025 and May 2026, nearly 24 million hryvnias were raised, which were used to purchase weapons for the Ukrainian Defence Forces.

In June 2026, the ‘Come Back Alive’ Foundation announced that it had handed over 10 mortars and 10 Ukrainian-made automatic grenade launchers, purchased as part of the project, to four brigades of the Ukrainian Defence Forces. Taras Chmut, the head of the foundation, announced that the transfer of the weapons had been completed on 1 June 2026.

== See also ==
- Rail transport in Ukraine
- Transport in Ukraine
- Railway electrification system

== Bibliography ==
- EC (11 July 2023). "Strategy for the EU integration of the Ukrainian and Moldovan rail systems". transport.ec.europa.eu. European Commission.
