= Oleksiy Zhuravko =

Ukrainian politician (1974–2022)

- Олексій Журавко
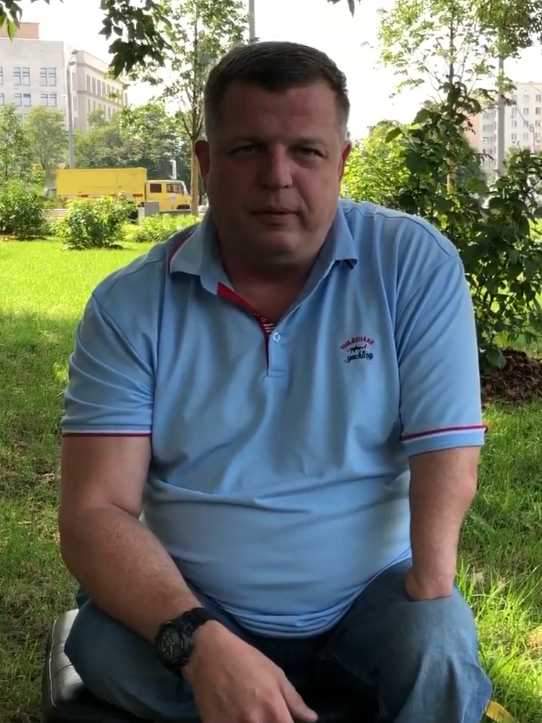
- Zhuravko in 2019

Member of the Verkhovna Rada
- In office 25 May 2006 – 12 December 2012

Personal details
- Born: Oleksiy Valeriyovych Zhuravko; 21 April 1974 Zhovti Vody, Dnipropetrovsk Oblast, Ukrainian SSR, USSR
- Died: 25 September 2022 (aged 48) Kherson, Ukraine
- Citizenship: Soviet Union (1974–1991); Ukraine (1991–2022); Russia (2022)
- Party: For United Ukraine! (2002); Party of Regions (2006–2022); United Russia (2022)
- Spouse: Anzhela
- Children: 1
- Education: Kherson State University
- Awards: Order of Merit (2000, 2004)

Oleksiy Valeriyovych Zhuravko (Ukrainian: Олексій Валерійович Журавко, Russian: Алексей Валерьевич Журавко, romanized: Aleksey Valeryevich Zhuravko; 21 April 1974 – 25 September 2022) was a Ukrainian and Russian politician who was a member of Ukraine's national parliament Verkhovna Rada from 2006 to 2012. He was a member of the pro-Russian Party of Regions from 2006. Zhuravko moved to Russia in 2015. He acquired Russian citizenship and joined the United Russia party in July 2022. He died in September 2022 in a missile attack in Kherson during the Ukrainian southern counteroffensive.

Zhuravko was virtually posthumously convicted of high treason in Halytskyi District Court of Lviv in February 2026. Ukrainian authorities cannot officially confirm the death of Oleksiy Zhuravko, so he was tried as a living person and sentenced in absentia to 15 years in prison with confiscation of all his property.

== Early life and education ==
Born on 21 April 1974 in Zhovti Vody, Zhuravko lived in an orphanage from 1974 to 1978. In 1978, he moved to a boarding school in Tsiurupynsk where he lived until 1990. From 1990 until his return to Tsiurupynsk in 1993, Zhuravko had his vocational education in a boarding school in Luhansk.

Beginning in 1997, Zhuravko started several companies aimed at the disabled in Ukraine in Tsiurupynsk. In 2007, Zhuravko completed his education at the Kherson State University, majoring in economic theory. The same year, Zhuravko and his wife, Anzhela (born 1986), had a daughter.

== Political career ==
Zhuravko failed to be elected in the 2002 Ukrainian parliamentary election as a candidate of For United Ukraine! in Kherson Oblast's electoral district 183.

In 2004, Zhuravko became chairman or the Union of Public Organizations "Confederation of Public Organizations of Disabled People of Ukraine." Zhuravko was awarded the Ukrainian Order of Merit twice. Third Class in 2000 and Second Class in 2004. In the 2006 and 2007 parliamentary election Zhuravko was elected to the Verkhovna Rada (Ukraine's national parliament) for the Party of Regions. In 2006, he was placed 118th on the party list, and the following year he dropped 22 places.

In the 2012 parliamentary election, Zhuravko again failed to be elected; this time as a Party of Regions candidate in electoral district 186 (also located in Kherson Oblast). On 17 April 2013, Zhuravko was appointed Government Commissioner for the Rights of the Disabled. This position was abolished on 5 March 2014.

Zhuravko moved to Russia in 2015. On 21 February 2015, he attended an anti-Euromaidan rally/commemoration in Moscow. In October 2015, Zhuravko was reportedly "hiding from Ukrainian authorities" and openly supporting separatism. In December 2015, Zhuravko's title of honorary citizen of Tsiurupynsk was removed. In January 2018, a pre-trial investigation was started into his alleged financing of the Donetsk People's Republic and Luhansk People's Republic quasi-states proclaimed within the territory of Ukraine.

Zhuravko acquired Russian citizenship and joined the United Russia party in July 2022. Following the February 2022 Russian invasion of Ukraine, he returned to Russian occupied Kherson in late April 2022. On 22 September 2022, Zhuravko published a video in which he cast his vote in Kherson at the 2022 annexation referendums. He stated that the Kherson Oblast's (Russian) occupation was the region's "liberation from Ukrainian nationalists." Zhuravko called on Russia "to complete the special operation and reach the western borders of Ukraine in order to liberate the country from the nationalists." He became wanted by the Security Service of Ukraine and was suspected of actions "aimed at violently changing or overthrowing the constitutional order or seizing state power". Zhuravko was killed on 25 September 2022, during the Ukrainian southern counteroffensive, in a missile strike on Kherson which pro-Kremlin authorities blamed on Ukraine.

== See also ==
- Collaboration with Russia during the Russian invasion of Ukraine
- Oleh Tsiura
