= Yevhen Liashchenko =

Ukrainian railways executive (born 1974)

Yevhen Anatoliiovych Liashchenko (Ukrainian: Євген Анатолійович Лященко; born 28 July 1974) was the chairman of the management board of JSC Ukrainian Railways from 21 March 2023 to 18 November 2024. Prior to this, he served as a member of the management board responsible for corporate functions.

== Biography ==
Yevhen Liashchenko graduated from National University of Kharkiv, majoring in "Economic Cybernetics". Before joining JSC "Ukrainian Railways", he held the position of director of the company "Media Group Ukraine", and later he was an advisor on strategy and transformation of Starlight Media Holding. In addition, Yevhen Liashchenko was an advisor to the Deputy Prime Minister, Minister of Digital Transformation of Ukraine Mykhailo Fedorov and Minister of Infrastructure of Ukraine Oleksandr Kubrakov. At the beginning of his career, he worked as a management consultant at Commerzbank Consortium; a regional sales manager at Coca-Cola HBC; a consultant at TNK-BP; a financial director at Closed Joint Stock Company with Foreign Investment "Slobozhanska Budivelna Keramika", London & Regional Properties, Corum Group; a financial director and an executive director at Foreign Invested Enterprise "Papastratos Ukraine".

== Work at JSC "Ukrainian Railways" ==
In October 2021, Yevhen Liashchenko was included on the management board of JSC "Ukrainian Railways", where he was responsible for several activity areas of the company: finance, HR, IT, and legal activity. On 21 March 2023, by order of the Cabinet of Ministers of Ukraine, Yevhen Liashchenko was appointed chairman of the management board of JSC "Ukrainian Railways" for a term of 2 years The main tasks of Yevhen Liashchenko as the Chairman of Ukrainian Railways include: rebuilding railway infrastructure destroyed by military actions and missile strikes, expanding railway connections with EU countries, and modernizing rolling stock.

On 4 December 2023, the United States, through USAID, and JSC "Ukrainian Railways" signed a Memorandum of Understanding to mutually support the development of a 75-kilometer (47-mile) segment of dually gauge track which will connect Lviv, a planned transportation hub in western Ukraine, to the Trans European Network for Transport. Among the results of Yevhen Liashchenko's work as the Chairman of Ukrainian Railways were the expansion of international railway connections and restoration of cargo transportation volumes (in particular, grain exports). During 2023, new routes to Poland and Austria were opened. The opening of a route to the Czech Republic is planned.

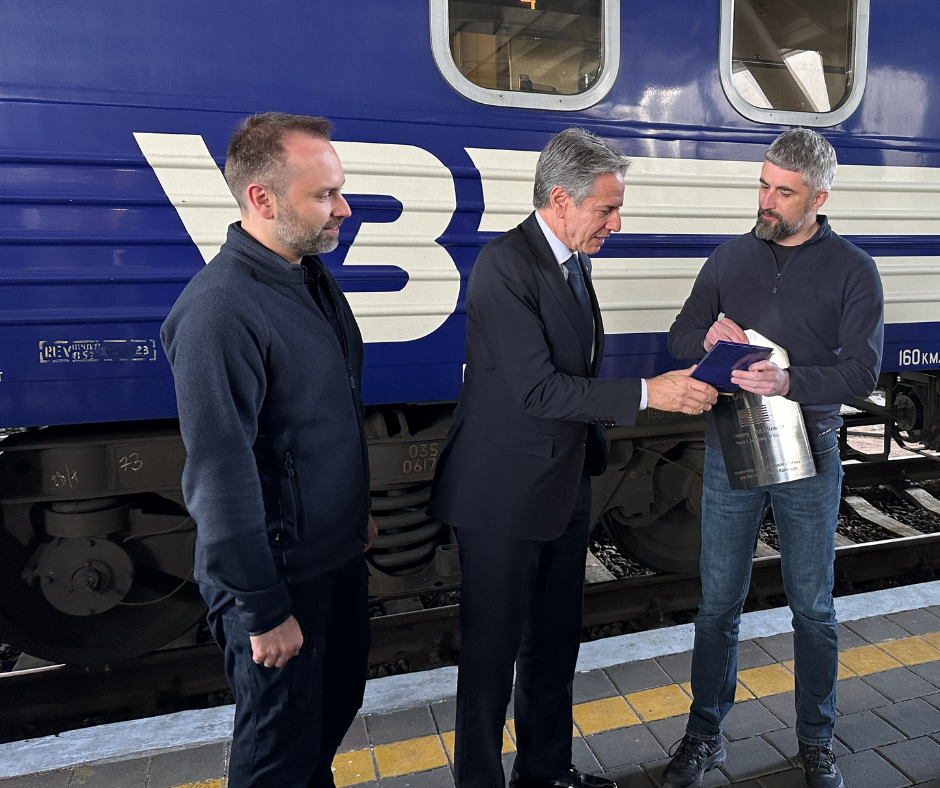

In January 2024, Ukrainian Railways showed a record results of cargo transportation since 24 February 2022. 148.4 million tons of cargo were transported by railway in all types of connections in 2023.

The establishment of production of grain wagons capable of operating on both 1520 mm (Ukraine) and 1435 mm (a significant number of EU countries) gauge tracks. thumb Yevhen Liashchenko is implementing further changes regarding the modernization of Ukrainian Railways and the reconstruction of the destroyed infrastructure. Despite the war, Ukrainian Railways claims it has repaired and renewed 289 kilometers of track in 2023, restored 15 bridges, built 528 new freight rail cars and repaired around 9,000 other rail cars. Among the humanitarian projects of Ukrainian Railways is the launch of Food Train in partnership with the Howard Buffett Foundation. The train can operate autonomously for 5–7 days and its equipment allows it to prepare complete full-course meals: soups, cereals, salads, meats, etc. Special thermo boxes installed inside the train allows to transport ready-made portioned food containers from the train kitchen to the end consumer.
