= ChS2 =

Class of 1062 Soviet electric locomotive

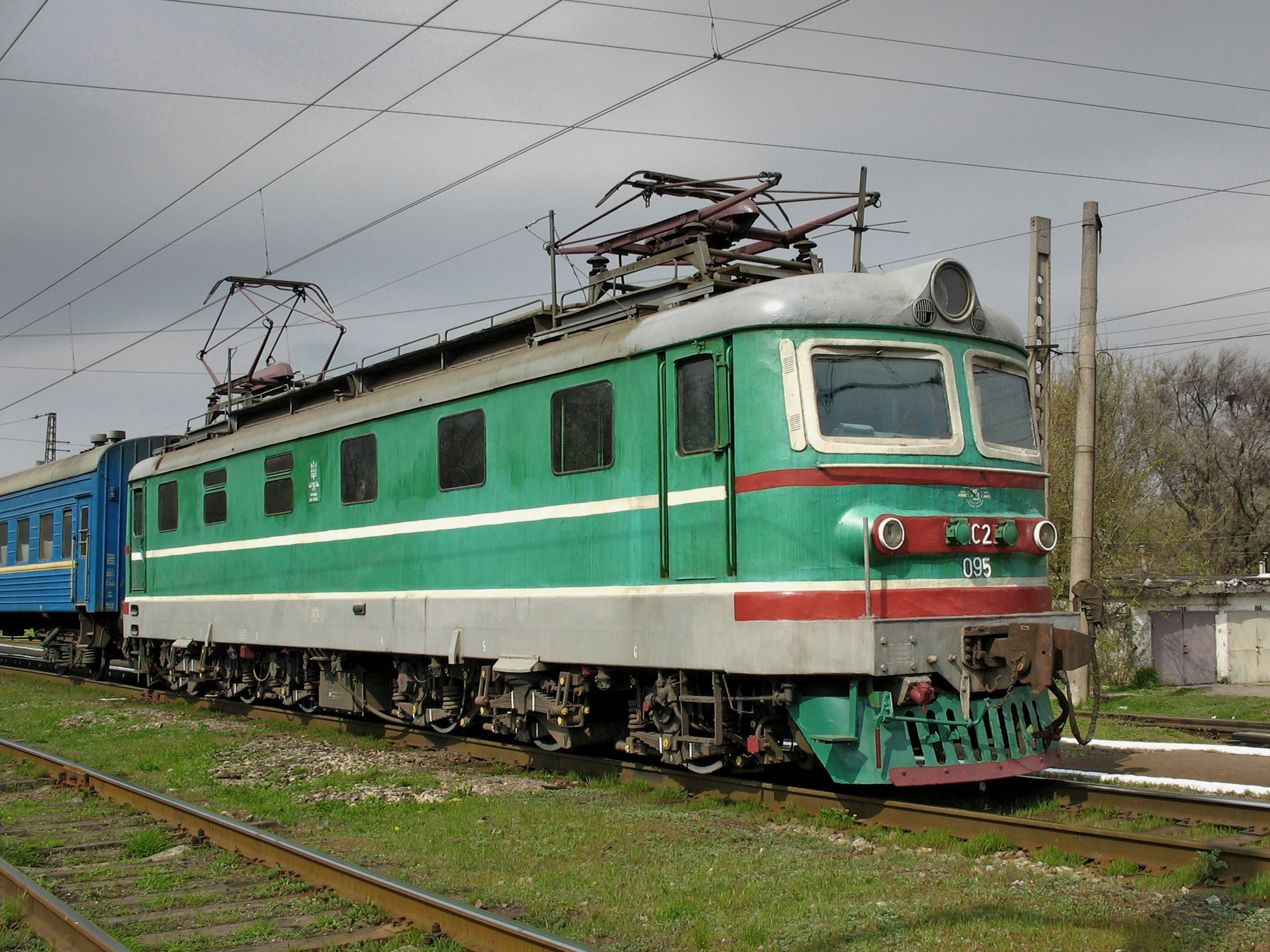
- Locomotive ChS2-095 at Dnipro-Vantazhny railway station, Ukraine
Type and origin
- Power type: Electric
- Builder: Škoda Works
- Build date: 1958-1976
- Number rebuilt: ChS2 and ChS2K - 942; ChS2T - 120
Specifications
- Gauge: 1,524 mm (5 ft); 1,520 mm (4 ft 11 27/32 in) Russian gauge
- Electric system/s: 3 kV DC Catenary
- Current pickup: Pantograph
Performance figures
- Maximum speed: 160 km/h (99 mph)
Career
- Operators: РЖД (RZhD), УЗ (UZ)
- Locale: Russia; Soviet Union; Ukraine

The ChS2 Russian: ЧС2 is an electric mainline DC passenger locomotive used in Russia and Ukraine. It was manufactured by the Škoda Works in Czechoslovakia between 1958 and 1973. and the locomotive get their nickname, Cheburashka, the oversized ears of the popular Soviet animated character of the same name

== Gallery ==
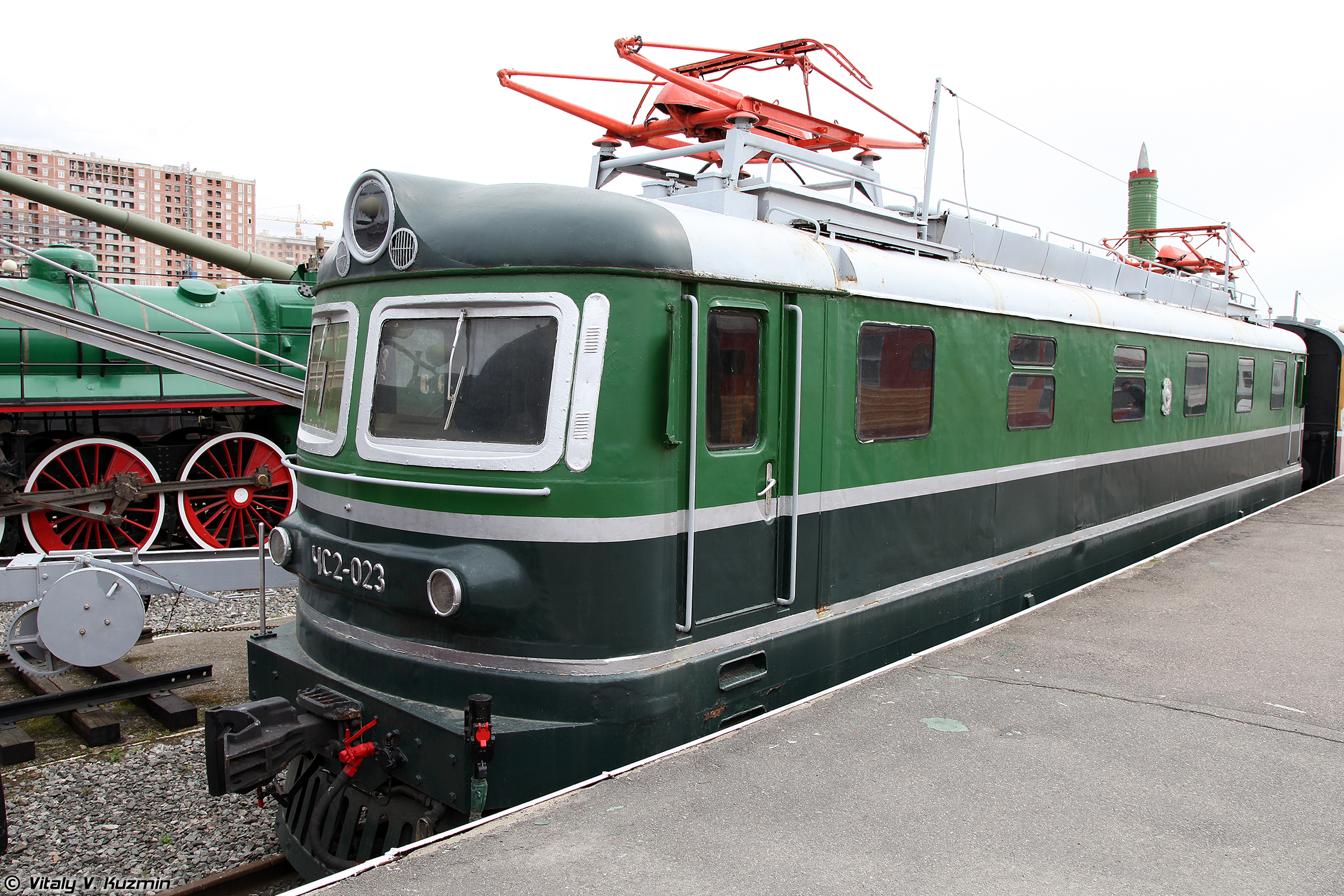
ChS2-023 at the Central Museum of Railway Transport, Varshavsky Rail Terminal, St. Petersburg

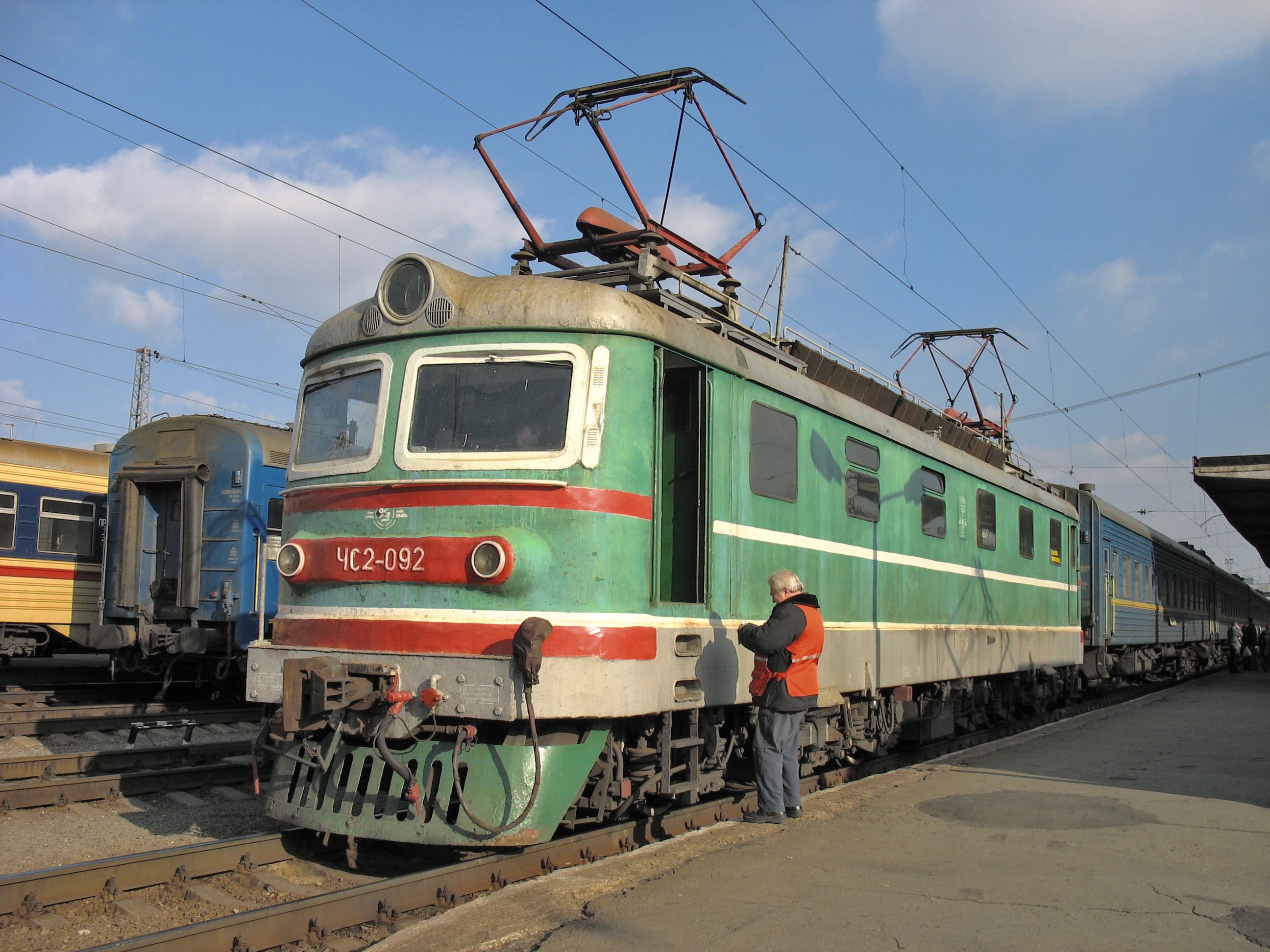
ChS2-095 at Dnipro railway station, Ukraine

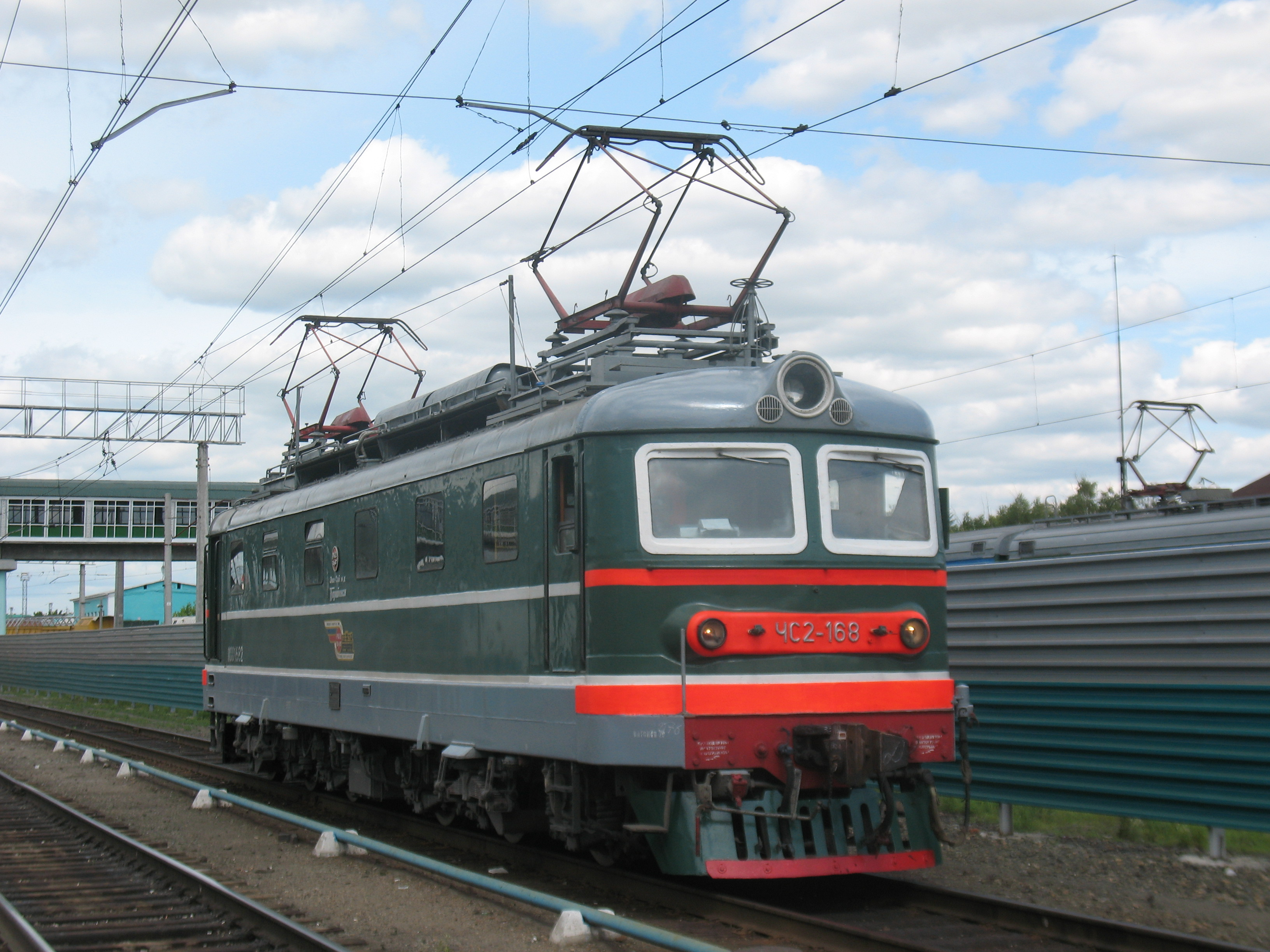
ChS2-168 at Omsk railway station

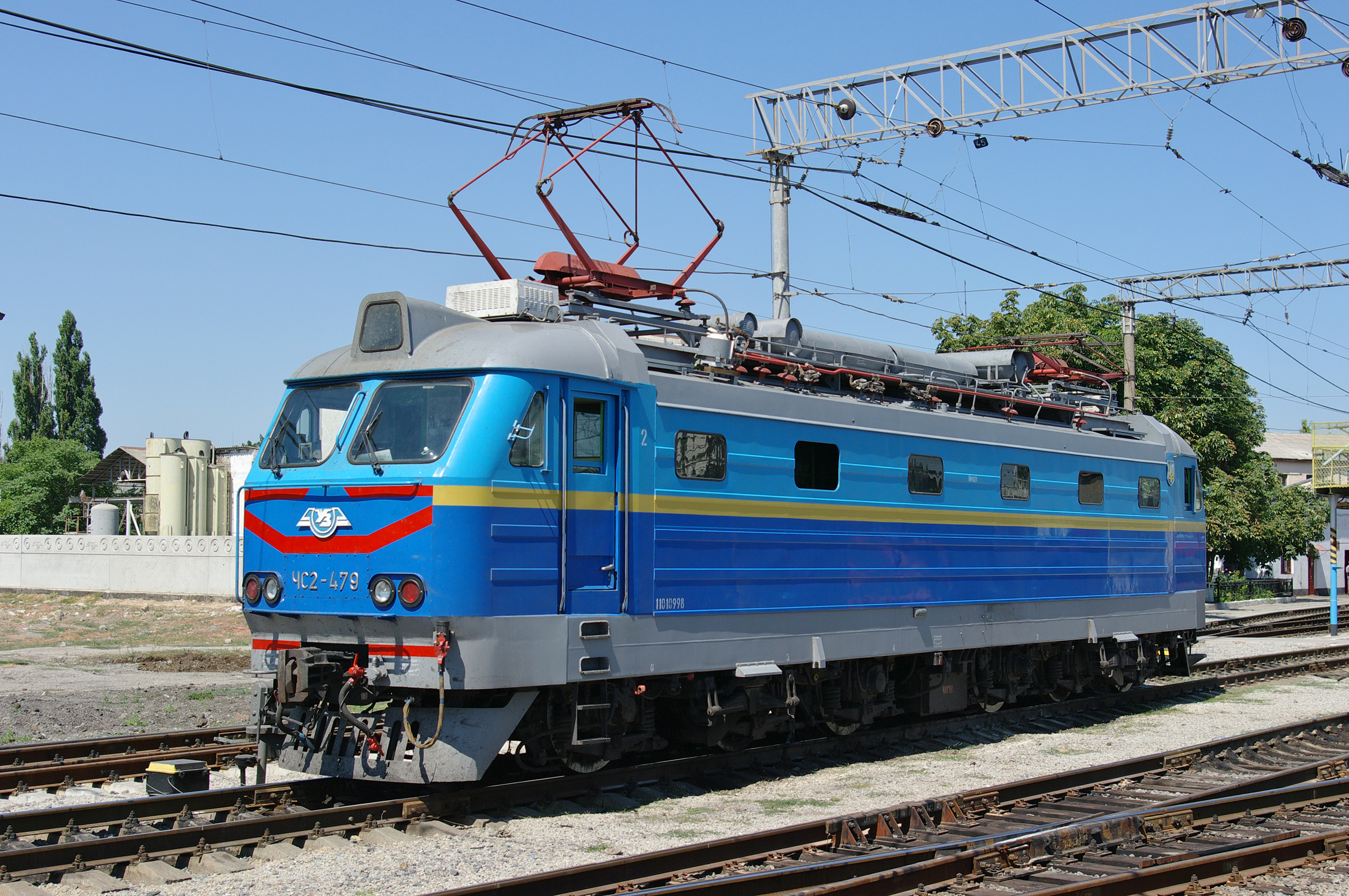
ChS2-479

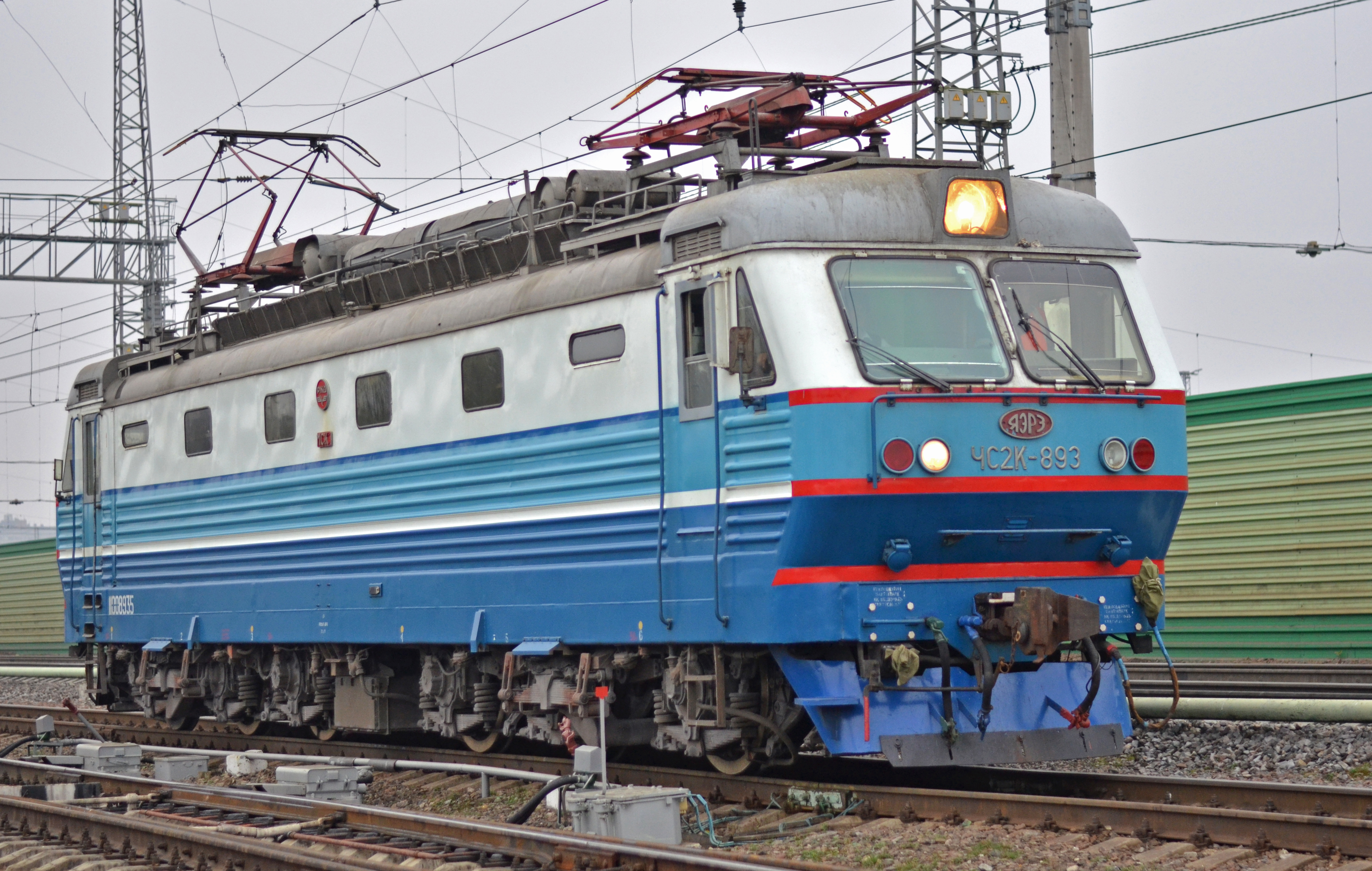
ChS2K-895

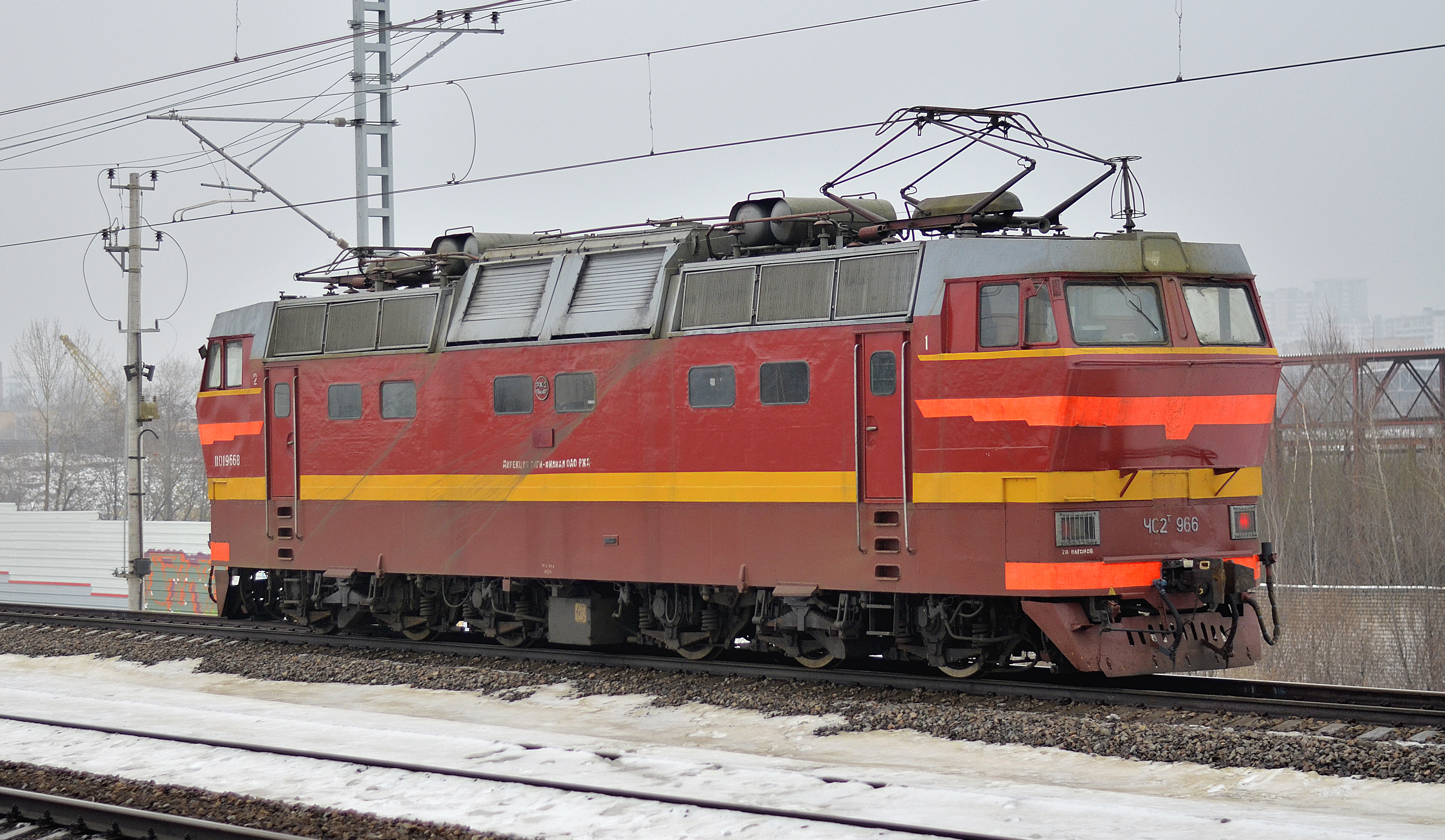
ChS2T-966

== See also ==
- The Museum of the Moscow Railway, at Paveletsky Rail Terminal, Moscow
- Rizhsky Rail Terminal, Moscow, Home of the Moscow Railway Museum
- Varshavsky Rail Terminal, St.Petersburg, Home of the Central Museum of Railway Transport, Russian Federation
- History of rail transport in Russia
