= VL40U =

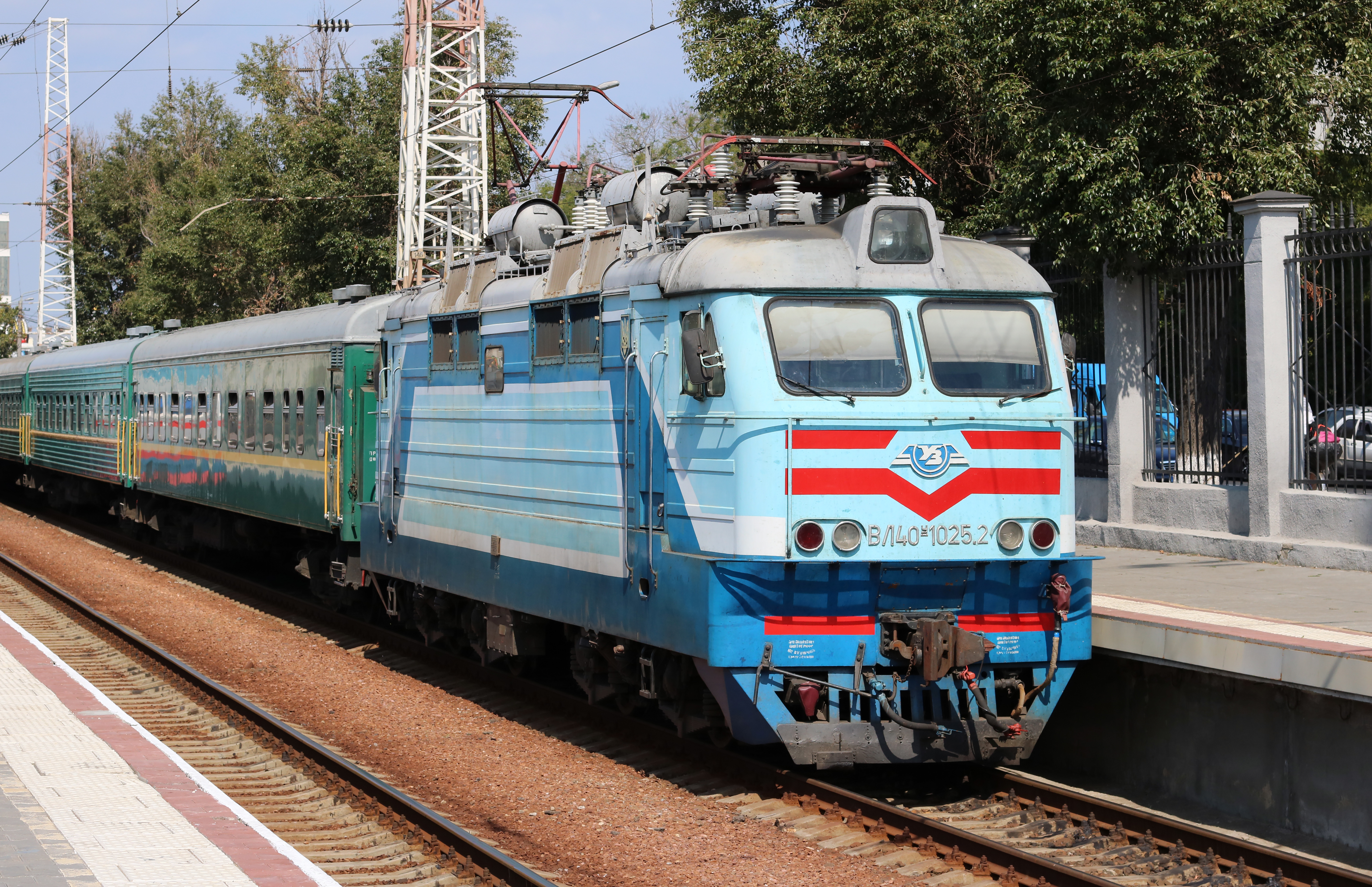
- Electric loco VL40U-1025-1, Odesa, Ukraine
Type and origin
- Power type: Electric 25 kV, 50 Hz
- Build date: 2004-
Specifications
- Gauge: 1,520 mm (4 ft 11 27/32 in)
Career
- Operators: Ukrainian Railways
- Locale: Ukraine

VL40U — is a AC passenger electric locomotive modernized from sections of the VL80t freight electric locomotive of 2004 for the needs of Ukrzaliznytsia. In the process of modernization, each electric locomotive received new control cabins and equipment.

Modernization was carried out at the Zaporizhzhia and Lviv locomotive repair plants in two versions, which differed from each other in the shape of the cab.

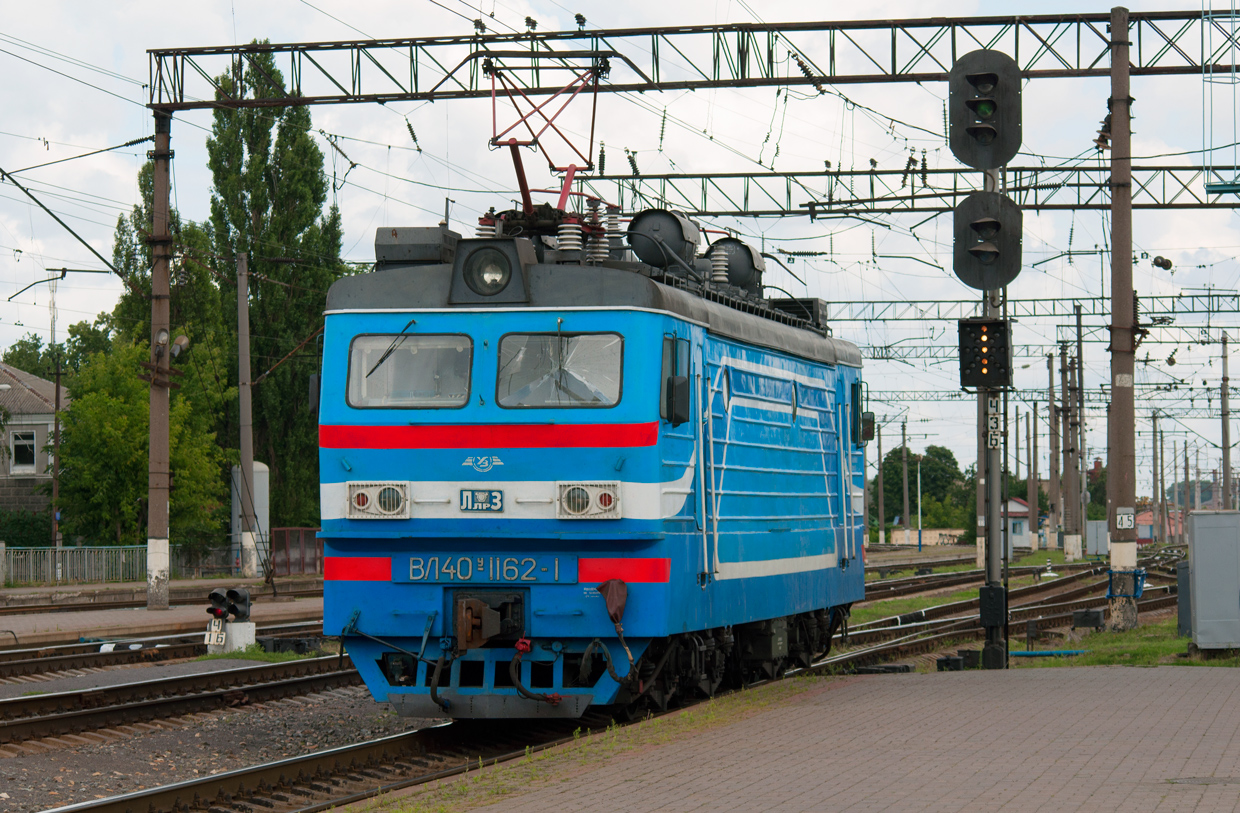
VL40U-1162-1

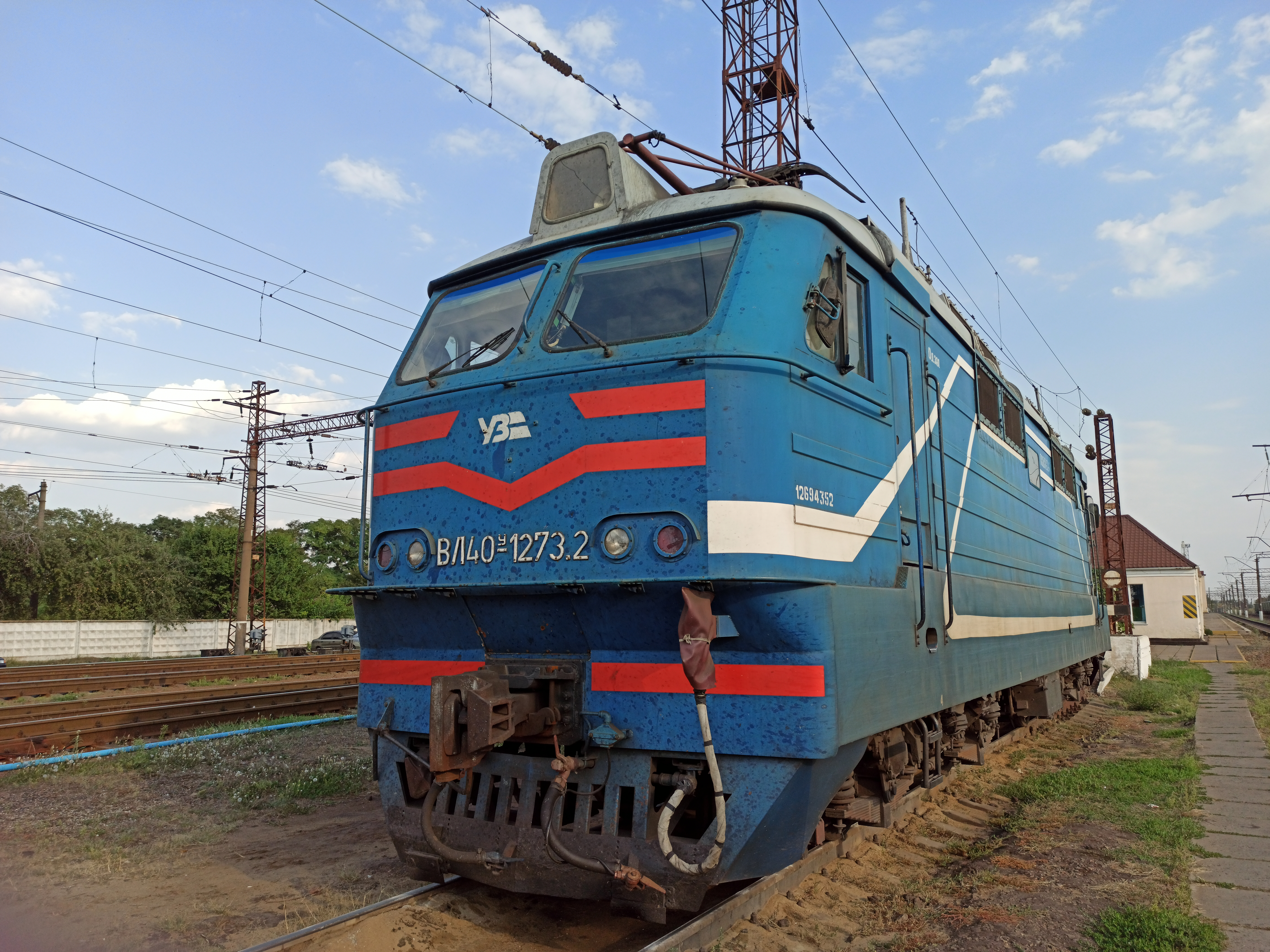
VL40U-1273-2

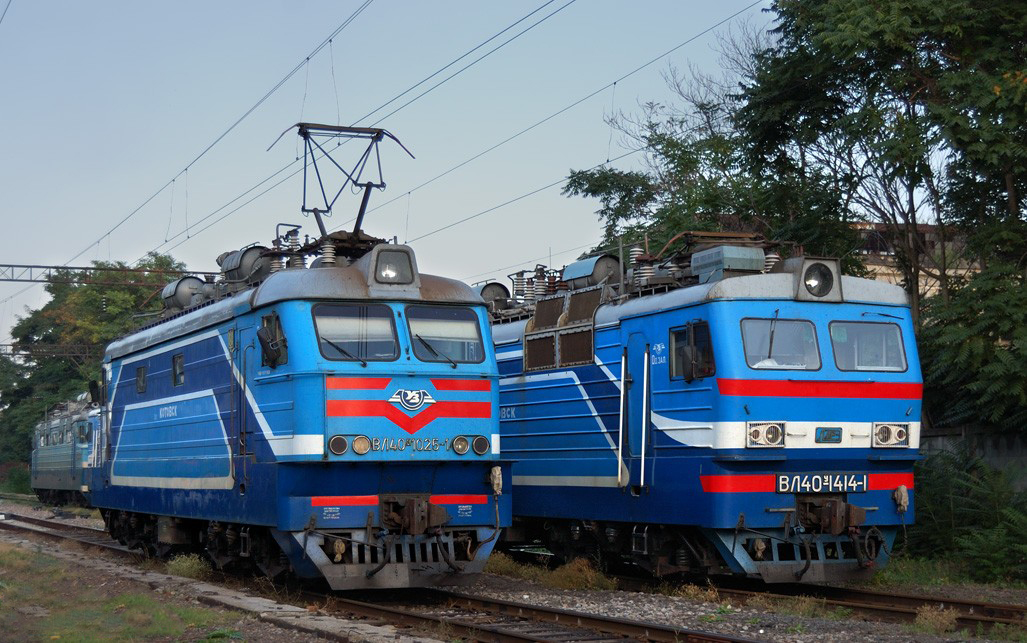
VL40U-1025-1 and 1414-1

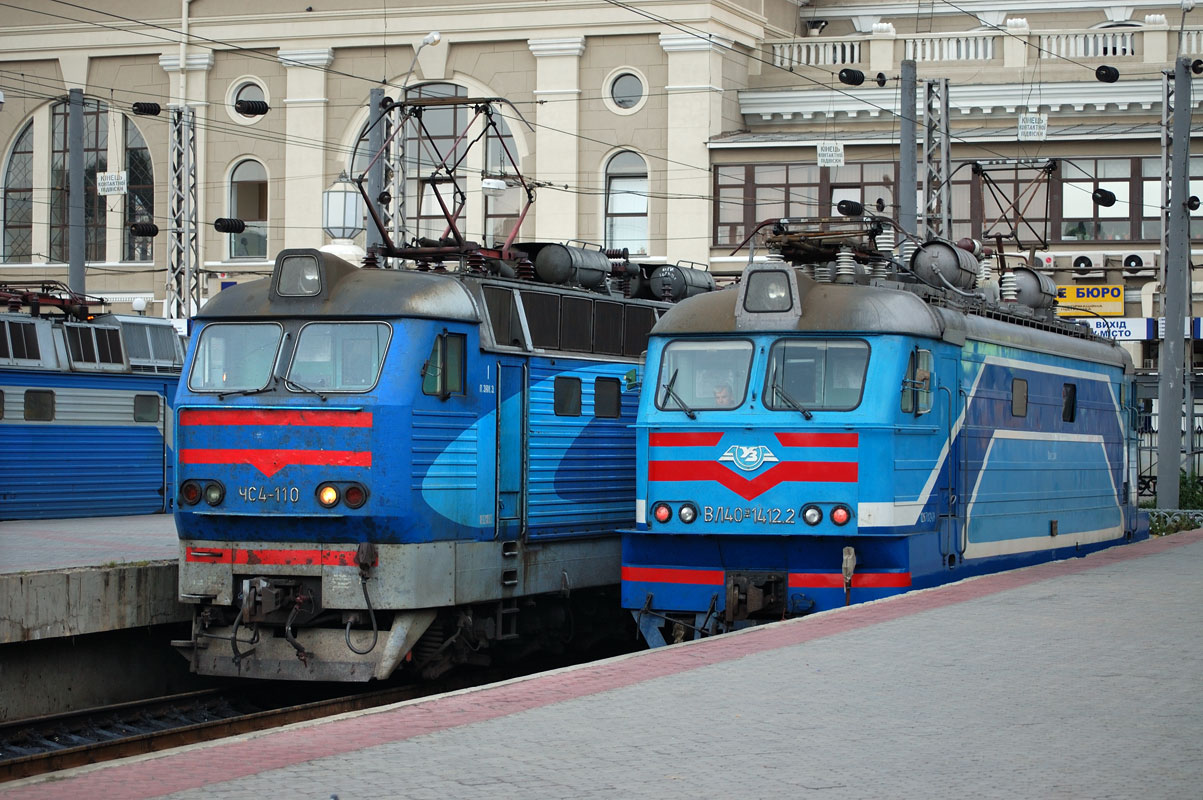
VL40U-1412-2 and ChS4-110
