= 2EL5 =

Ukrainian AC electric locomotive

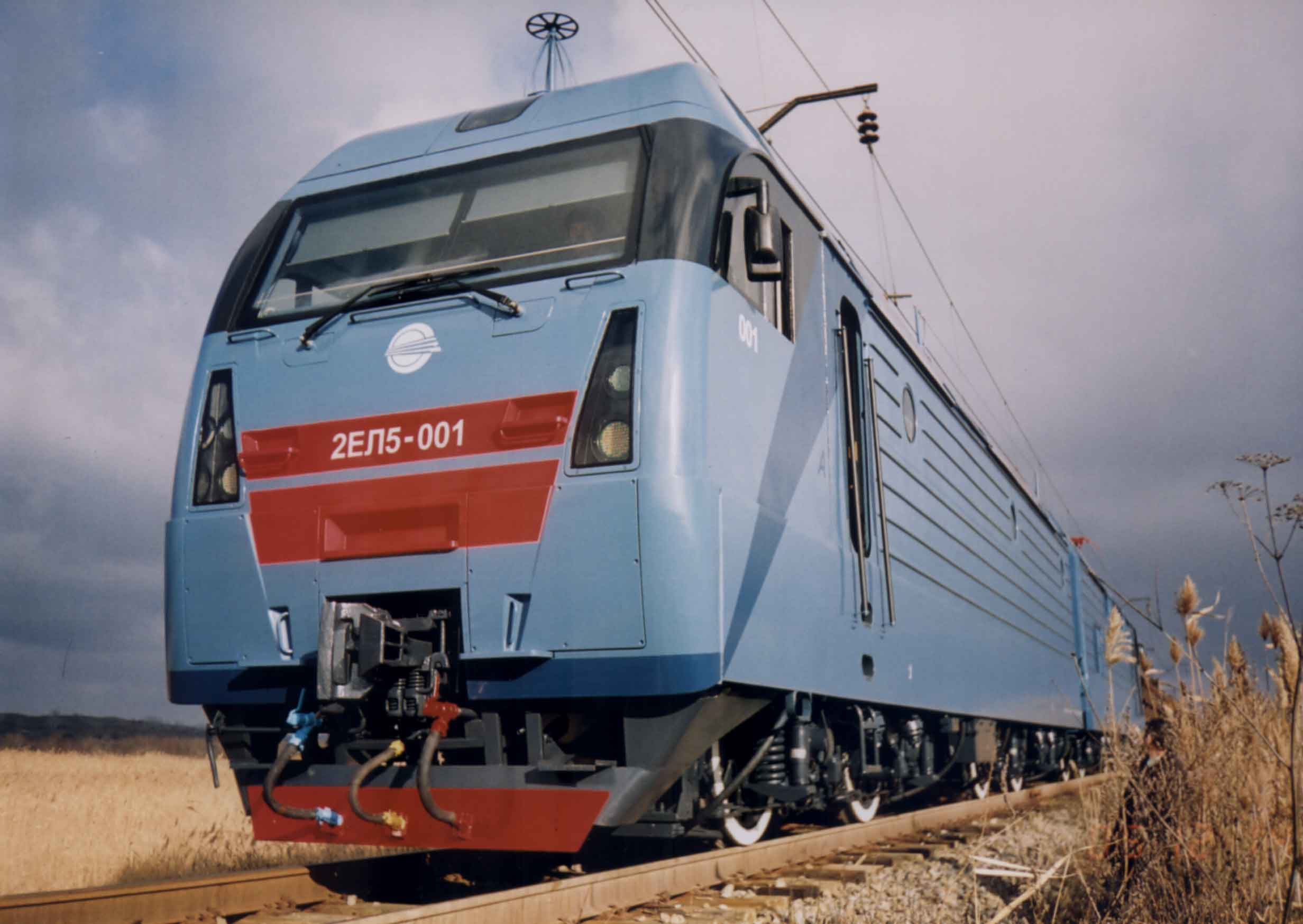
Type and origin
- Power type: Electric 25 kV, 50 Hz
- Build date: 2005-
Specifications
- Gauge: 1,520 mm (4 ft 11 27/32 in)
Performance figures
- Maximum speed: 110 km/h (68 mph)
Career
- Operators: Ukrainian Railways
- Locale: Ukraine

The 2EL5 is a Ukrainian AC electric locomotive manufactured by Luhanskteplovoz. Ukrainian Railways leased 70 2EL5 locomotives in 2013, as replacements for Soviet-era VL8s.
