= TEP150 =

Ukrainian diesel locomotive

TEP150 Class
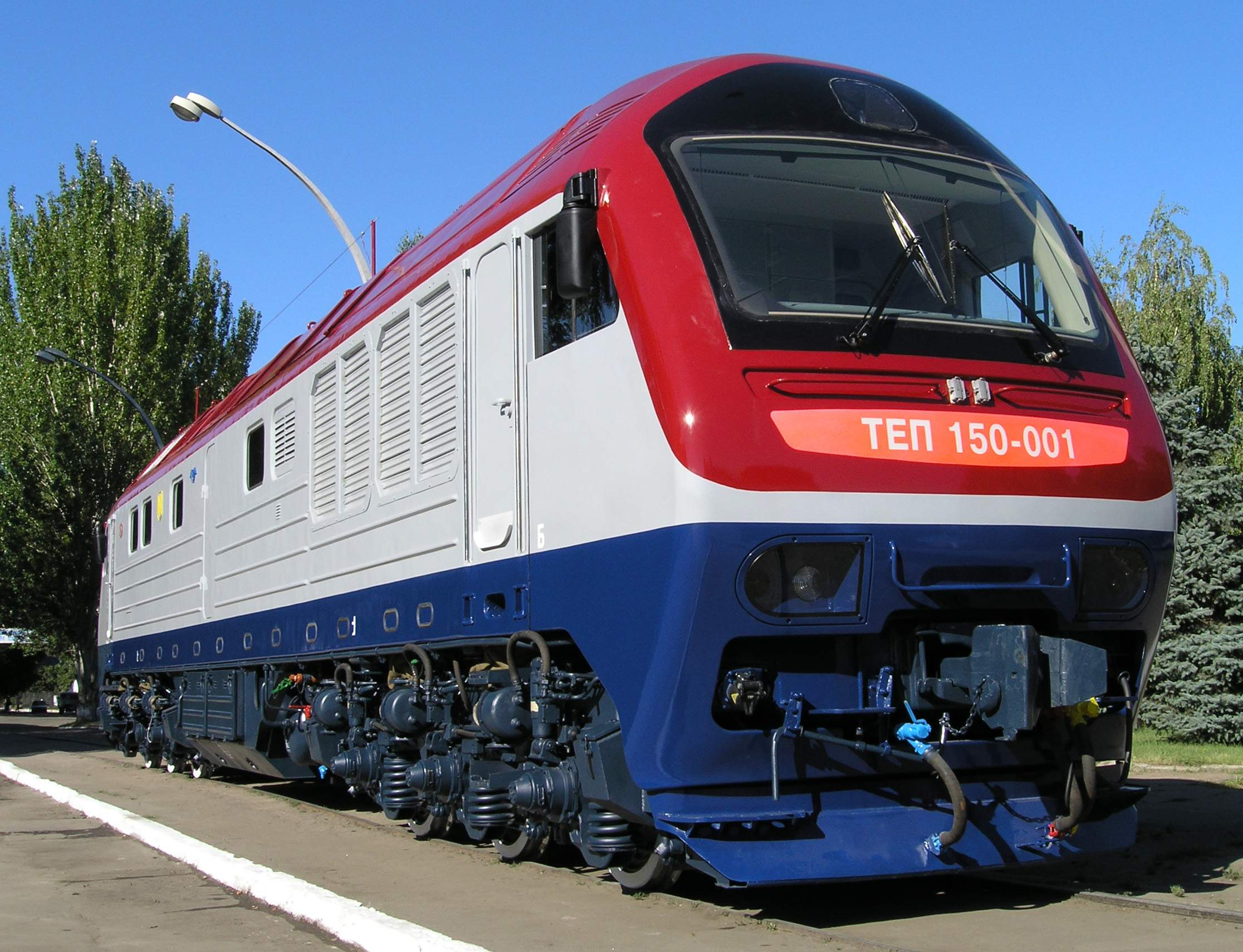
- TEP150–001 in Kyiv in 2006.
Type and origin
- Builder: Luhanskteplovoz
- Build date: since 2005
- Total produced: 4
Specifications
- Configuration
  - UIC: Co'Co'
- Gauge: 1,520 mm (4 ft 11 27/32 in)
- Length: 20.35 m
Performance figures
- Maximum speed: 160 km/h

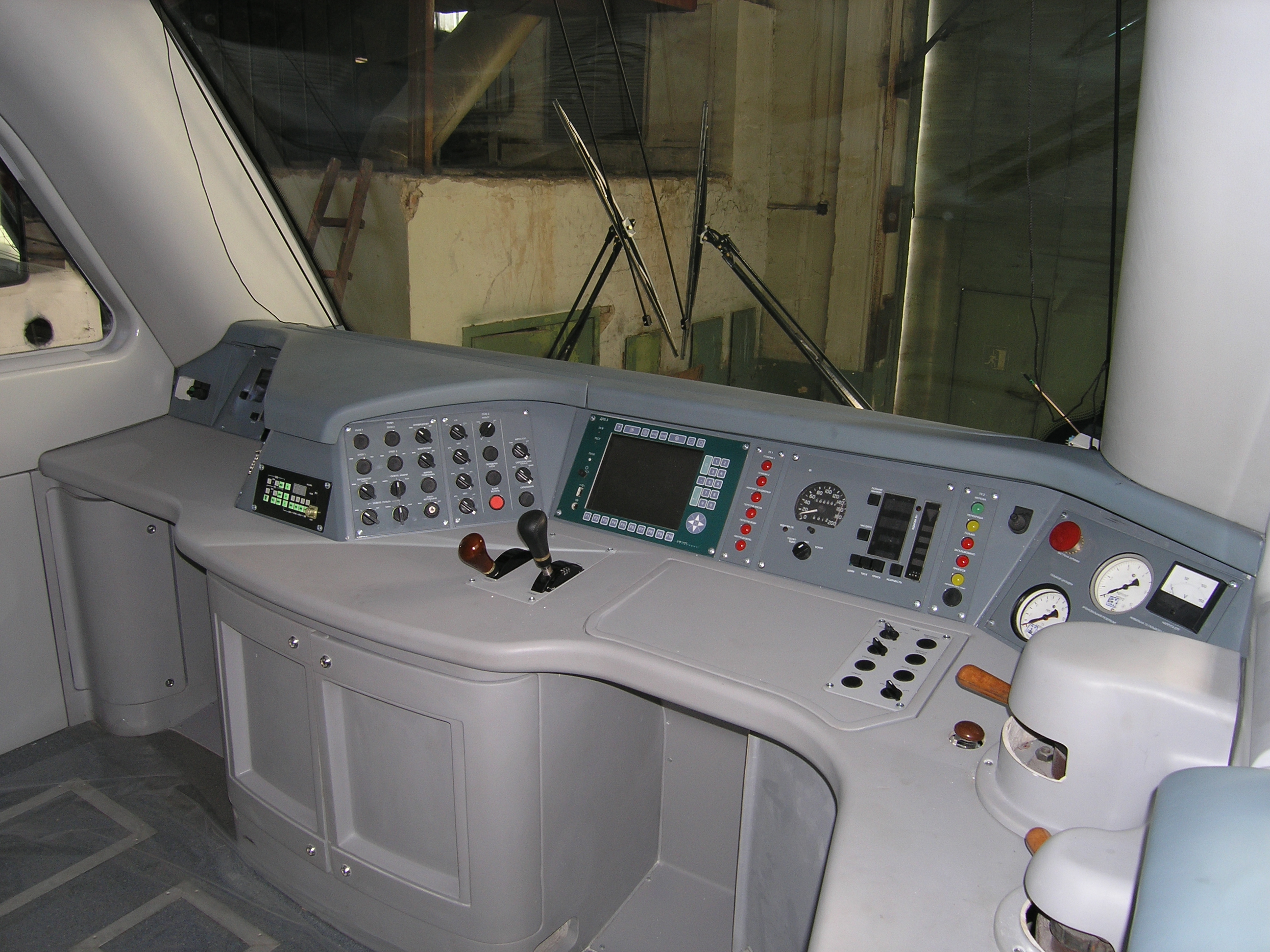

TEP150 is a Ukrainian diesel locomotive for regional rails with a Co'Co' wheel arrangement. It is produced by Luhanskteplovoz. The diesel engine of the locomotive powers a generator which feeds electric motors built into the bogies. There have been four built as of 2008. One was produced in 2005 and the three others in 2008. All of them operate on the lines of Southern Railway. These are part of the Kremenchuk stall's stock.
