= DS3 (locomotive) =

DS3 (ДС3)
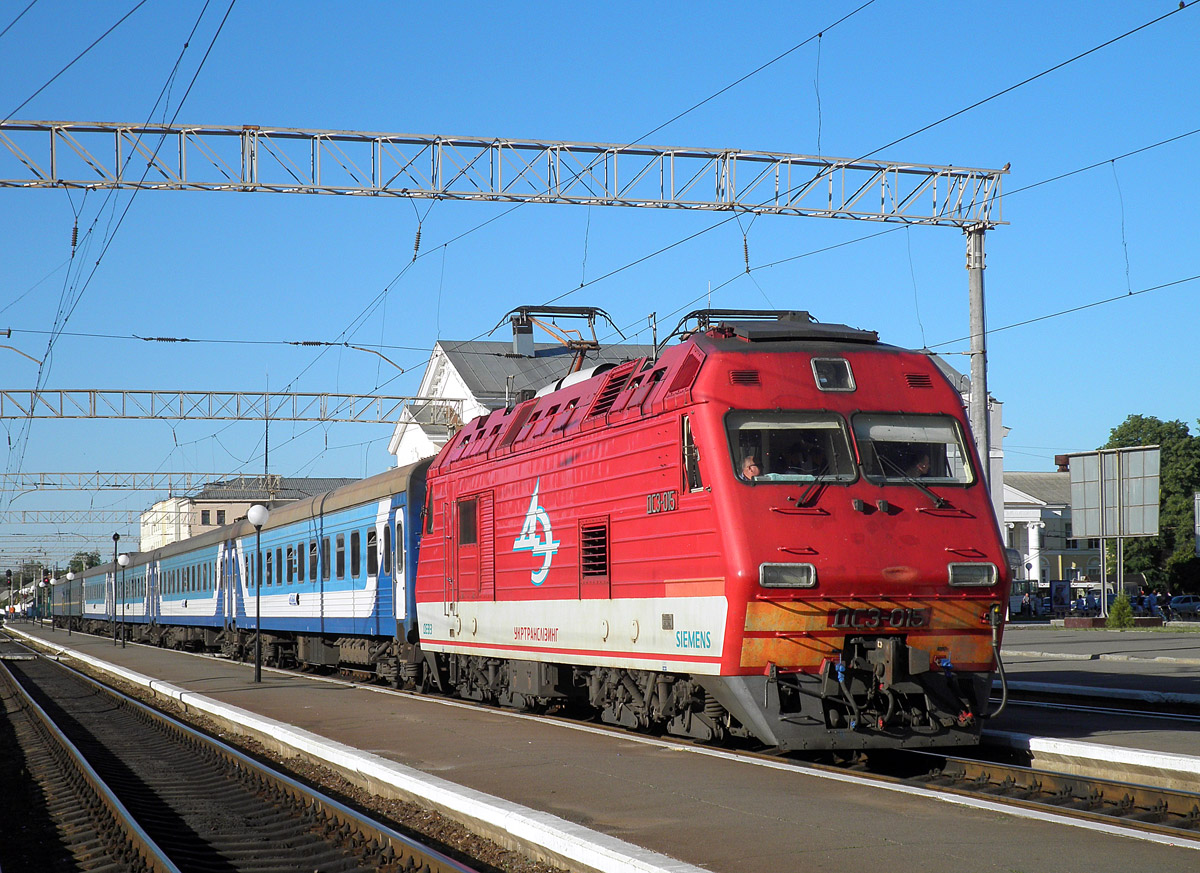
- Electric locomotive DS3-015 in Poltava
Type and origin
- Power type: Electric
- Builder: DEVZ
- Build date: 2003–2008
- Total produced: 18
Specifications
- Configuration
  - UIC: Bo′Bo′
- Gauge: 1,520 mm (4 ft 11 27/32 in) Russian gauge
- Loco weight: 90 t
- Traction motors: 4
- Loco brake: Air and electric
- Train brakes: Air
- Safety systems: ALSN
Performance figures
- Maximum speed: 160 km/h (99 mph)
- Power output: 4,800 kW (6,400 hp)
- Tractive effort: 310 kN (70,000 lbf)

The DS3 (Ukrainian: ДС3) is an AC electric locomotive manufactured by Dnipropetrovsk research-and-production association for electric locomotive engineering (NPO DEVZ) jointly with Siemens. (Ukrainian: Дніпропетровський електровозобудівний завод, ДЕВЗ)

== Equipment ==
Siemens provided the power electronics while DEVZ produced the chassis, traction motors, auxiliary machinery etc.

== Use ==
The DS3 was designed as a dual-purpose locomotive for both passenger and freight service, but now is used primarily for pulling express passenger trains.

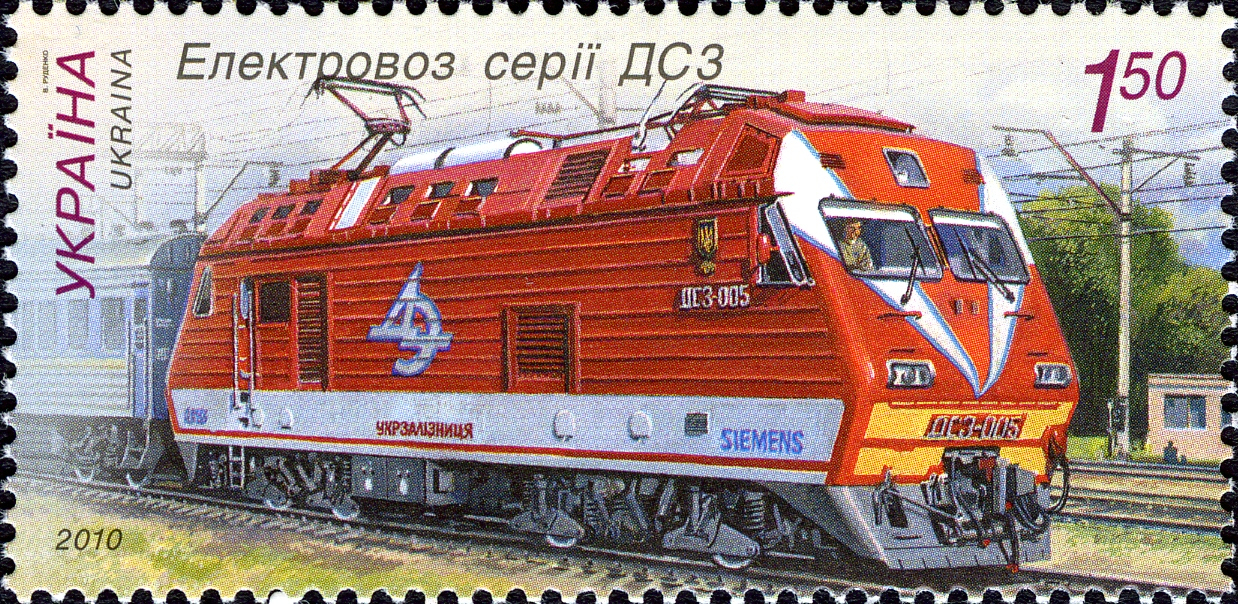
Postage stamp of Ukraine
