= Narrow-gauge railways in Ukraine =

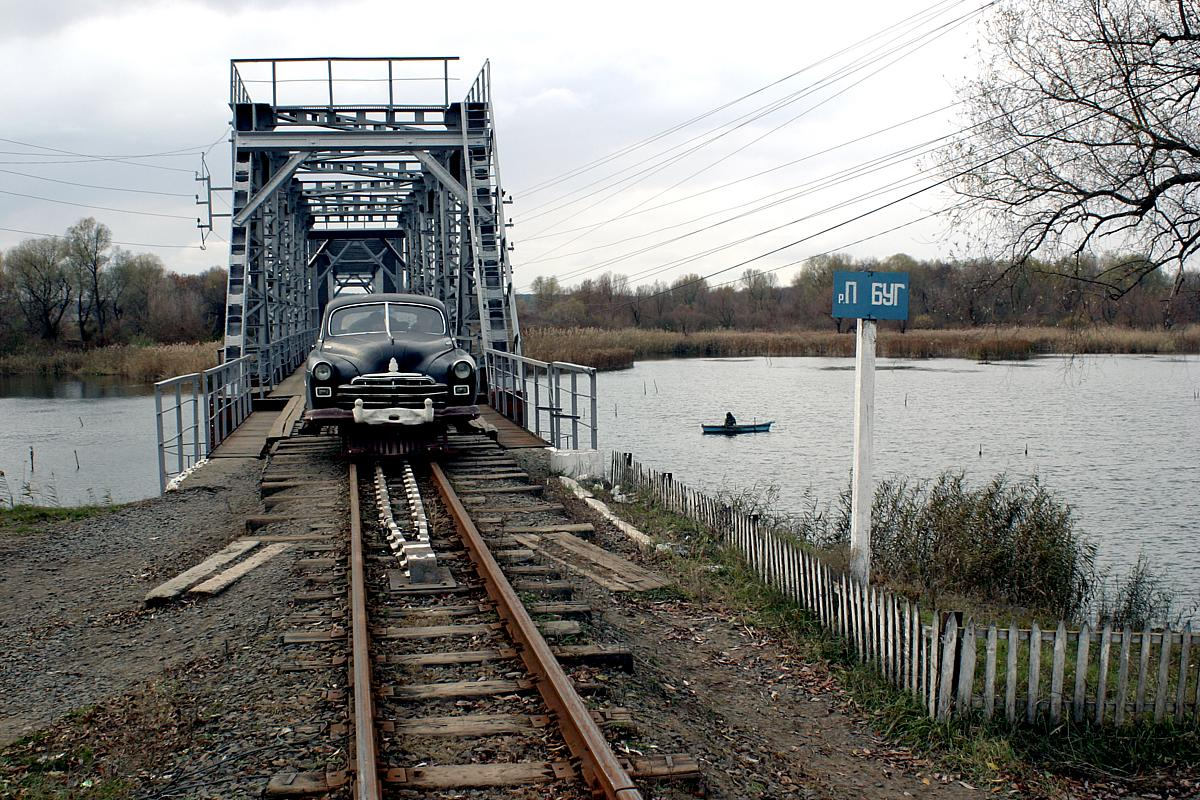
ZIM railcar on the bridge over Pivdennyi Buh on Haivoron narrow-gauge railway

Various 750 mm (2 ft 5 1/2 in) gauge railways operate in Ukraine as common carrier, industrial railway or children's railways.

== 750 mm (2 ft 5 1/2 in) gauge common carrier ==
Lines in Carpathian Ukraine

- Berehove region network, around 200 km, initially built during the Austro-Hungarian Empire at the gauge of 760 mm (2 ft 5 15/16 in) and regauged to 750 mm (2 ft 5 1/2 in) when Ukraine became part of the Soviet Union
- Uzhhorod region, 35 km, built at the gauge of 760 mm (2 ft 5 15/16 in) and regauged to 750 mm (2 ft 5 1/2 in).

Antonivka-Zarichne system in West Ukraine

- Built around 1900 at the gauge of 750 mm (2 ft 5 1/2 in)

Central Ukraine

- Haivoron network, built around 1900 at the gauge of 750 mm (2 ft 5 1/2 in), 703 km.
- Novopoltavka railways
- Vapniarka railways, 140 km, built at the 600 mm (1 ft 11 5/8 in) gauge by Germany, later regauged to 750 mm (2 ft 5 1/2 in)

== 750 mm (2 ft 5 1/2 in) gauge industry, agricultural and forest railways ==
Industrial, peat, sugar and forestry lines

- Mykhailivka sugar railway, 1932–1990.
- Okhtyrka sugar railway, 56 km, 1940–1999.
- Potash industrial lines, 49 km, 1933–2003.
- Smyha peat railways
- Teresva forestry railway, 138 km, built at the gauge of 750 mm (2 ft 5 1/2 in) and regauged to 760 mm (2 ft 5 15/16 in) (Between the two World Wars the region was a part of Czechoslovakia) and back to 750 mm (2 ft 5 1/2 in).
- Vyhoda system, 180 km of forest railways

== 750 mm (2 ft 5 1/2 in) pioneer railways ==
Ten pioneer or children's railways exist in various cities.

- Dnipro pioneer railway, 2 km in the Lazar Hloba Park in Dnipro, opened in 1936.
- Donetsk pioneer railway, 2 km in the Central Scherbakov Park of Culture and Leisure in Donetsk, opened in 1972.
- Yevpatoria pioneer railway near Yevpatoria on the Crimea Peninsula, opened around 1990, abandoned.
- Kharkiv pioneer railway, 4 km in the northern part of Kharkiv, opened in 1940.
- Kyiv pioneer railway, 3 km in the Syretskyi Park in Kyiv, opened in 1953.
- Lutsk pioneer railway in Lutsk, built 1952–1954.
- Lviv pioneer railway, 1,9 km in the Stryiskyi Park in Lviv
- Uzhhorod pioneer railway on the bank of the River Uzh in Uzhhorod, opened in 1947.
- Rivne pioneer railway, 2 km, in Rivne, opened in 1949.
- Zaporizhia pioneer railway, 9 km, between the main railway station of Zaporizhia and the River Dnipro, opened in 1972.
