= Defence Forces of Ukraine =

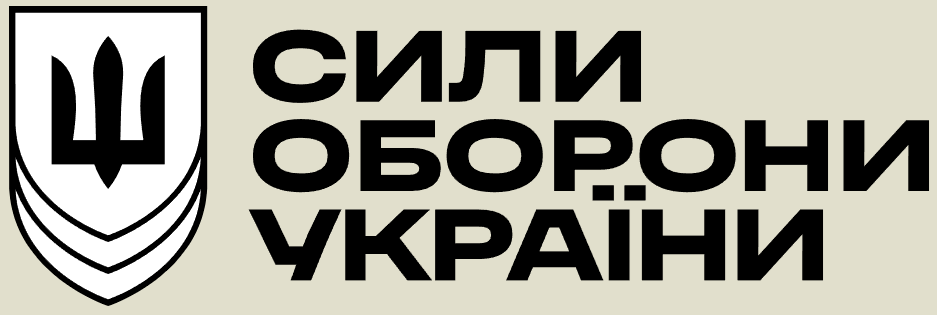
A Ukrainian logo of the Defence Forces of Ukraine; there are several variations

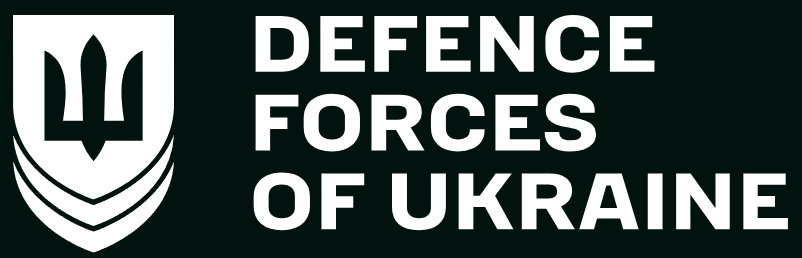
An English logo of the Defence Forces of Ukraine

Defence Forces of Ukraine (Ukrainian: Сили оборони України, romanized: Syly oborony Ukrajiny) or Security and Defence Forces of Ukraine (Ukrainian: Сили безпеки й оборони України, romanized: Syly bezpeky i oborony Ukrajiny) refers to all armed institutions of Ukraine engaged in the country's defence against the military aggression of the Russian Federation, mostly reporting to two government ministries:

1. Ministry of Defence of Ukraine: the Armed Forces of Ukraine (Ukrainian: Збройні сили України, romanized: Zbroini syly Ukrajiny, ZSU), including the Territorial Defence Forces and Unmanned Systems Forces (USF); and separately, the Main Intelligence Directorate (HUR).
2. Ministry of Internal Affairs of Ukraine: the National Guard of Ukraine (mostly the 1st Azov Corps and the 2nd Khartiia Corps), the Security Service of Ukraine (SBU), the State Border Guard Service of Ukraine (including the Ukrainian Sea Guard), and the National Police of Ukraine.

The security and defence forces form part of Ukraine's security and defence sector, which also includes the defence industry of Ukraine and others. The National Security and Defence Council of Ukraine (NSDCU) coordinates the planning and actions of the Ministries of Internal Affairs and Defence and all agencies under their wings.

Many of these organisations have their own drone forces, but are not part of the Unmanned Systems Forces (USF), which in April 2026 accounted for only c. 31.15% of all Russian personnel losses inflicted by Ukrainian drone operations. Certain deep strike drone operations may be carried out through inter-service cooperation; for example, USVs such as the Sea Baby are operated by the Ukrainian Navy, in coordination with the HUR and SBU.

As of the end of January 2023, the definition set out in the Law on National Security of 2018 remains in force:

The security forces are law enforcement and intelligence agencies, specialised state bodies with law enforcement functions, civil protection forces and other bodies entrusted by the Constitution and the laws of Ukraine with the task of ensuring Ukraine’s national security.

The defence forces are the Armed Forces of Ukraine, as well as other military formations established in accordance with the laws of Ukraine, law enforcement and intelligence agencies, and special-purpose agencies with law enforcement functions, which are entrusted by the Constitution and the laws of Ukraine with the task of ensuring the defence of the state.

== Emblems ==
National Security and Defence Council of Ukraine

Armed Forces of Ukraine (ZSU)

National Guard of Ukraine

State Border Guard Service of Ukraine

Security Service of Ukraine (SBU)

Foreign Intelligence Service of Ukraine

Main Intelligence Directorate (HUR)

State Special Communications Service

National Police of Ukraine

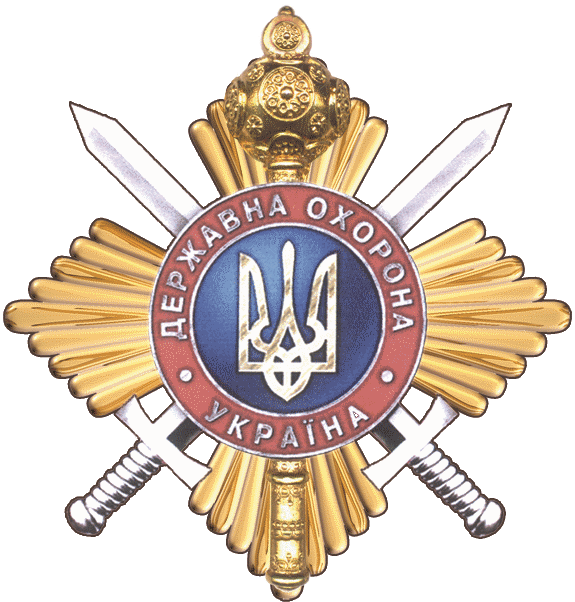
State Security Administration

State Transport Special Service

State Emergency Service of Ukraine

State Prison Service of Ukraine

Bureau of Economic Security of Ukraine

State Bureau of Investigation

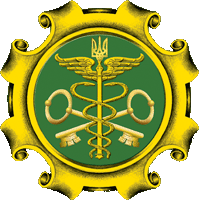
State Customs Service of Ukraine

Territorial Defence Forces

Unmanned Systems Forces (USF)

== See also ==
- Ukrainian territorial defence battalions (2014–2022), former volunteer military units created in 2014, and reorganised as Territorial Defence Forces in 2022
- Ukrainian Air Defence Forces (1992–2004), former anti-aircraft military service
- International Legion (Ukraine), officially the "International Legion for the Defence of Ukraine" (2022–present)
- Structure of the Armed Forces of Ukraine
