= Disability in Ukraine =

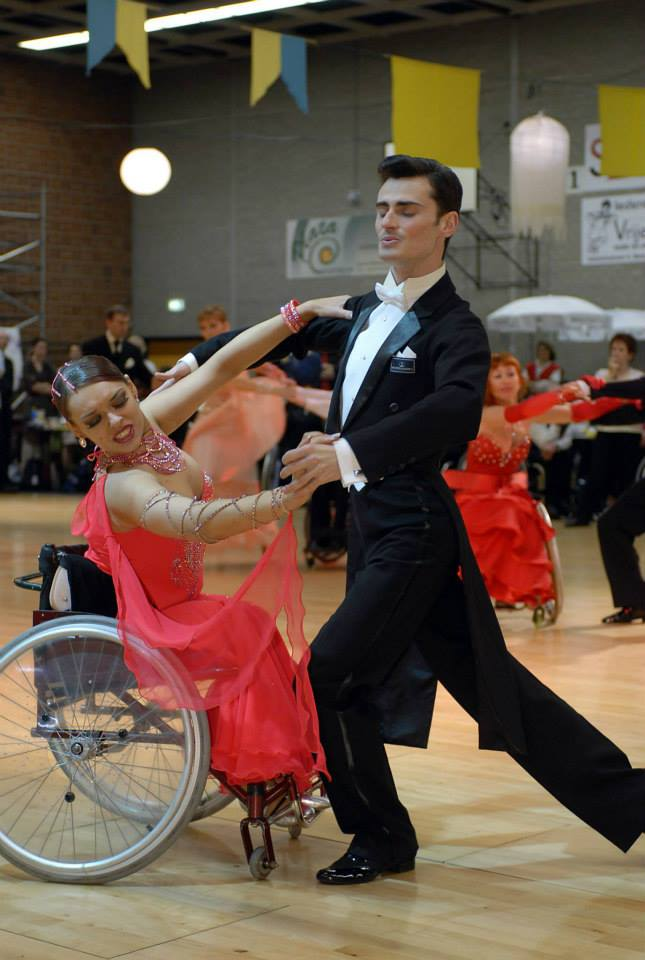
Ukrainian dance duo Oleksandr Ivanov and Ilona Slugovina in 2014

2.7 million people in Ukraine (6%) were reported having a disability in 2014. This number did not include the (reportedly) 1.5% of people with temporary disabilities. In 2014, 35% of people aged 60–70 had some age-related disability. For people aged over 80 years, this number grew to 50%.

Ukraine is notoriously "disability unfriendly". For example, in the capital Kyiv only 4% of infrastructure is considered to be "disability friendly".

In the 1990s unemployment rates for disabled people rose sharply in Ukraine (and other Eastern European countries) due to economic downfall.

In 2021 Ukraine's national railway company Ukrzaliznytsia launched its first disabled-friendly trains with dedicated wheelchair space.

Ukraine is one of the most successful countries of the Paralympic Games.

== See also ==
- Healthcare in Ukraine
- Health in Ukraine
