= Railways of Novorossiya =

Russian state-owned railway company

FSUE "Railways of Novorossiya"
- Type: Federal State Unitary Enterprise
- Industry: Railways
- Founded: 29 May 2023; 3 years ago
- Headquarters: Donetsk

The Railways of Novorossiya (Russian: Железные дороги Новороссии, romanized: Zheleznye dorogi Novorossii) is a state-owned railway company headquartered in Donetsk, both managing infrastructure and operating freight and passenger train services in Donetsk People's Republic, Lugansk People's Republic, and Russian-controlled areas of Kherson and Zaporizhzhia oblasts.

Railways of Novorossiya is a unitary enterprise company independent of Russian Railways. It was established on 29 March 2023, following the Russian annexation of Donetsk, Kherson, Luhansk and Zaporizhzhia oblasts from units of Prydnipro Railways and Donets Railway of Ukrainian Railways.

== History ==
The company was established by order of the Government of the Russian Federation on 29 May 2023, No. 1404-r. It was handed the assets of the enterprises "Donetsk Railway", "Luhansk Railway", "Kherson Railway", "Melitopol Railway," and the "Donbass Railways" concern.

According to Kommersant, the company will receive 6.7 billion rubles from the Russian federal budget in 2024 to cover losses. These funds will ensure the transportation of a guaranteed cargo base of 7.4 million tons of products from the mining and metallurgical industries. This is 25 times less than the transport volumes of 2012, but investments are necessary to maintain infrastructure in regions affected by hostilities.

== Stations ==
- Azovstal railway station
- Donetsk railway station
- Izvaryne railway station
- Luhansk railway station
- Mariupol railway station
- Melitopol railway station
- Novooleksiivka railway station
