= Severyn Krasnopera =

Ukrainian lawyer and military officer (1888–1946)

- Северин Йосипович Краснопера
- Born: 30 May 1888; Skoryky, Zbarazh County, Kingdom of Galicia and Lodomeria, Austria-Hungary
- Died: 7 August 1946 (aged 58); Innsbruck, Austria
- Education: University of Lviv; Charles University (LL.D.)
- Military career
- Allegiance: Austria-Hungary; West Ukrainian People's Republic; Ukrainian People's Republic
- Branch: Austro-Hungarian Army (Ukrainian Sich Riflemen); Ukrainian Galician Army; Ukrainian People's Army
- Service years: 1914–1920
- Rank: Poruchnyk (USS); Sotnyk (UHA)
- Units: Ukrainian Sich Riflemen; Ukrainian Galician Army
- Commands: Training Inspector, Legion of Ukrainian Sich Riflemen (1917–1918); Training Commandant, Legion of Ukrainian Sich Riflemen (1918); Commandant of the Ukrainian garrison at Pidzamche railway station (1918); Instructor, Infantry NCO School in Zolochiv (1919); Official, Staff of the Military Plenipotentiary of the Dictator of WUPR (1919–1920); Head of the Field Chancellery, Ministry of Military Affairs of the UPR (1920)
- Conflicts: World War I * Eastern Front; Polish–Ukrainian War * Battle of Lemberg * Chortkiv offensive Ukrainian–Soviet War; Ukrainian–White conflict

Severyn Yosypovych Krasnopera (Ukrainian: Северин Йосипович Краснопера; 30 May 1888 – 7 August 1946) was a Ukrainian lawyer, Doctor of Law, military officer, and public and cultural figure. He served as a poruchnyk (first lieutenant) in the Legion of Ukrainian Sich Riflemen (1917) and a sotnyk (captain) in the Ukrainian Galician Army (UHA, 1919). During the Polish–Ukrainian War, he served as Training Commandant of the Legion of Ukrainian Sich Riflemen (1918), commandant of the Ukrainian garrison at Pidzamche railway station during the November 1918 fighting in Lviv, and head of the Field Chancellery of the Ministry of Military Affairs of the Ukrainian People's Republic (UPR). He was the brother of UHA khorunzhyi Leontii Krasnopera.

He was one of the founders of Ukrainian military phaleristics during the Ukrainian War of Independence: co-author of the design for the Order of Liberation (the prototype for the Cross of Symon Petliura), author of the design approved by Chief Otaman Symon Petliura for the Iron Cross of the Ukrainian People's Republic "For the Winter Campaign and Battles" (1920), and artist of the draft design "Motif of a Medal for Insurgents".

During the interwar period, Krasnopera was an active member of the Prosvita society, a choir conductor, an organizer of Ukrainian educational life and reading rooms in the Sieniawa and Zbarazh regions, and a defense counsel at the high-profile 1938 Zolochiv trial of members of the Organization of Ukrainian Nationalists (OUN). During World War II, he worked as a notary at the District Court in Lublin (1940–1941) and later practiced law in Ternopil (1943).

== Biography ==
=== Early life and education ===
Severyn Krasnopera was born on 30 May 1888 in the village of Skoryky in Zbarazh County, Kingdom of Galicia and Lodomeria, Austria-Hungary (now in Ternopil Raion, Ternopil Oblast, Ukraine), into the family of Greek Catholic priest Father Yosyp Krasnopera and his wife Yuzefa. His brother was Leontii (Lev) Krasnopera, who later served as a khorunzhyi in the Ukrainian Galician Army.

From 1898 to 1906, he studied at the Ternopil Ukrainian Gymnasium. He pursued higher education at the Faculty of Law of the University of Lviv. In 1910–1911, he completed his one-year volunteer military service in the Austro-Hungarian Army. Subsequently, he worked as an articled clerk (lawyer's assistant) in Zolochiv and Ternopil. As of 1914, he was listed on the staff of the Imperial-Royal Regional Court in Lviv, where he underwent judicial training as an auskultant (judicial candidate).

=== Military career ===
In August 1914, Krasnopera joined the Legion of Ukrainian Sich Riflemen (USS). He graduated from officer training school and fought on the fronts of World War I. As of March 1917, he held the rank of chetar (second lieutenant) in the Austro-Hungarian Army (assigned to Field Post No. 224) and contributed to fundraising for Ukrainian schools in Volhynia. At the turn of 1915–1916, as a chetar, he served as an instructor at the USS Training Unit (Vyshkil) following the relocation of the depot to the village of Svystilnyky (alongside chetar P. Semyrozum and khorunzhyi M. Devosyr). He later participated in reorganizing the Riflemen's training formation under the command of otaman Myron Tarnavsky.

In 1917, Krasnopera completed intensive training at a German instructors' school within the Training Group of the Southern Army under the command of Prince Oskar of Prussia. Having mastered modern German close-combat assault tactics (Nahkampf) and military drill, he became one of the leading USS officers specializing in training, who from the second half of 1917 independently conducted instruction for the Riflemen. In August 1918, he was appointed Training Commandant of the Legion and promoted to poruchnyk.

During the November Uprising of 1918, Krasnopera played a pivotal role in securing Ukrainian control over Kamianka-Strumylova. Together with chetar Salek and a group of USS non-commissioned officers, he led the disarmament of the officer training school of the Austro-Hungarian XI Corps, which at the time housed over 300 cadets of other nationalities. On 1 November 1918, Krasnopera traveled by car to Lviv, where street fighting had broken out, to receive operational orders from the Supreme Military Command. Returning that afternoon with news of the clashes in the capital, he organized an urgent recruitment of volunteers, forming a detachment of 50 soldiers under pidkhorunzhyi Merkun that immediately departed to reinforce the Ukrainian defenders of Lviv.

In November 1918, during the Battle of Lemberg, he commanded the Ukrainian garrison at Pidzamche railway station. On 7 November 1918, under the high command's operational plan, the Pidzamche garrison was tasked with dislodging Polish forces from the Zhovkva suburb and Zamarstyniv. However, the sector's position was critical due to relentless assaults by numerically superior regular Polish troops and armed civilian militias. Facing acute shortages of manpower and ammunition, Krasnopera forcefully demanded immediate reinforcements and supplies from headquarters, clashing with senior commanders over the feasibility of offensive orders given his exhausted troops. Despite the crisis, his unit held its positions, repelled all enemy attacks, took prisoners, and launched a counterattack past the Zhovkva tollgate, capturing part of Zamarstyniv.

He was subsequently captured by Polish forces, but escaped in December 1918 and rejoined the Ukrainian Galician Army (UHA). On 1 January 1919, he was promoted to sotnyk (captain). He later taught at the Infantry NCO School in Zolochiv. Following the UHA's retreat across the Zbruch River, he served on the staff of the Military Plenipotentiary of the Dictator of the West Ukrainian People's Republic Yevhen Petrushevych, and also held the post of Head of the Field Chancellery of the Ministry of Military Affairs of the Ukrainian People's Republic.

While serving in the UPR Ministry of Military Affairs in 1920, Krasnopera contributed to designing several Ukrainian military decorations. Alongside sotnyk Yulian Butsmaniuk, he drafted the design for the Order of Liberation; although never issued, its form later served as the basis for the Cross of Symon Petliura. Krasnopera also played a central role in designing the Iron Cross of the Ukrainian People's Republic "For the Winter Campaign and Battles". Building on Butsmaniuk's initial sketch of 17 May 1920, Krasnopera produced a new drawing on 4 September 1920 featuring a tryzub inside a blue circle framed by a four-pointed radiant star, with the motto "For the Freedom of Ukraine" (За волю України) on the reverse. This design was approved by Symon Petliura, though the star was rendered smooth and the reverse inscription slightly modified in final production.

Additionally, Krasnopera executed the artwork for the proposed "Motif of a Medal for Insurgents" (conceptualized by Ministry Secretary Colonel Valentyn Sadovskyi), featuring a portrait of Symon Petliura on the obverse and a rising sun, the date of the Fourth Universal of the Ukrainian Central Council ("19–22.I.18"), and the circular inscription "For the Liberation of the Homeland" (За визволення Батьківщини) on the reverse.

=== Legal career and public activity ===
In August 1920, Krasnopera emigrated to Czechoslovakia, where he graduated from Charles University in Prague with the degree of Doctor of Law. In autumn 1921, acting in Vienna as Military Representative of the Dictator of the West Ukrainian People's Republic, sotnyk Krasnopera initiated a strict Ukrainian-language proficiency audit among former foreign contract officers still listed on the Galician Army's rolls. In his September 1921 report, he listed 11 officers and officials who had failed to learn Ukrainian after two years of service despite contractual obligations. Among the four senior officers holding the rank of otaman (major) whom Krasnopera gave an ultimatum to pass a language exam within two to three months or face immediate dismissal were Richard Juckwer, Alfons Erle, E. Kliun, and H. Hliants.

In 1928, Krasnopera returned to Galicia, nostrified his law degree at the Jagiellonian University in Kraków, and worked as a lawyer's assistant in the village of Nove Selo (now in Ternopil Raion). On 24 June 1928, he helped organize a Shevchenko concert at the local Prosvita reading room in Nove Selo, conducting the village mixed choir in an excerpt from Mykola Lysenko's operetta Chornomortsi, with his brother Leontii performing as soloist.

From 1932, Krasnopera operated his own law office in the town of Sieniawa. Following the opening of his practice in autumn 1932, he emerged as a leading figure in revitalizing Ukrainian cultural and educational life in the county. He initiated a general Prosvita conference and chaired the organizing committee for the local Prosvita festival, personally touring surrounding villages—including Cieplice, Piskorowice, Leżachów, and Bilyna—to mobilize support. The resulting festival on 27 November 1932 drew roughly 3,000 peasants and spurred the revival of dormant reading rooms across the region.

In March 1938, Krasnopera served as one of the defense attorneys at a prominent trial in Zolochiv of members of the Organization of Ukrainian Nationalists (OUN), defending the accused alongside Stepan Shukhevych, Semen Shevchuk, and other lawyers. (Note: On 6 May 1937, acting on an unauthorized order by Vasyl Kuk that violated OUN directives on expropriations, an OUN group raided the estate of the Jasiński family in the village of Belzets for robbery, fatally shooting a brother and sister of the Jasiński family. The subsequent Zolochiv trial proved politically damaging to the OUN, drawing criticism from both the Polish and Ukrainian press that the underground was degenerating into common crime.) Specifically, Krasnopera represented defendant Andrii Maiba, who was fully acquitted by the jury and released from custody. (Note: Maiba appears to have had no involvement in the robbery or killings; prosecutors charged him solely with OUN membership, which the jury found unsubstantiated.)

On 14 June 1938, he transferred his law practice from Sieniawa back to Nove Selo. In spring 1939, he joined the leadership of the local Prosvita branch, lectured at training courses for leaders of self-education circles, and organized county-wide concerts commemorating the 125th anniversary of Taras Shevchenko's birth, including in the village of Koshliaky.

=== World War II and death ===
Shortly before or at the onset of the Soviet annexation of Eastern Galicia and Volhynia, Krasnopera relocated to German-occupied Poland. From 4 April 1940 to 29 October 1941, he worked as a notary attached to the mortgage department of the District Court in Lublin (at 76 Krakowskie Przedmieście Street). Recalling contacts with Krasnopera during this period, Jan Krukowski noted that he "had influence with the Gestapo". From 16 May to 15 November 1941, he resided in Lublin at 15 Głowackiego Street, Apt. 2, before moving to 6 Warszawska Street in the same city, sharing both residences with stenographer Pelagia Wieczorek.

As of 1943, Krasnopera was practicing as an attorney in Ternopil.

From 1945, he lived in Innsbruck, Austria, where he died on 7 August 1946 at the age of 58 and was buried on 9 August 1946. An obituary in the local newspaper Tiroler Tageszeitung identified him as a former attorney from Ternopil.

== Family ==
- Parents:
  - Father Yosyp Krasnopera — Greek Catholic priest in the village of Skoryky.
  - Yuzefa Krasnopera — mother.
- Siblings:
  - Leontii (Lev) Krasnopera — brother, khorunzhyi in the Ukrainian Galician Army.

== Sources ==
- Demianchuk, M. (1933). "Rozbroiennia starsh. shkoly v Kamintsi Strum. 1. XI. 1918 (Zi spomyniv uchasnyka b. khor. U. H. A. Mykh. Demianchuka)". Litopys Chervonoi Kalyny (in Ukrainian). Lviv: Chervona Kalyna. pp. 3–4.
- "Novynky. Na volynski shkoly". Dilo (in Ukrainian). No. 52. Lviv. 1917. p. 3.
- "Dopysy. Nove Selo, pov. Zbarazh. (Shevchenkivskyi kontsert)". Dilo (in Ukrainian). No. 187. Lviv. 1928. p. 4.
- "Dopysy. Siniavshchyna". Dilo (in Ukrainian). No. 25. Lviv. 1933. p. 4.
- Kaliendar-almanakh «Dnipro» na zvychainyi rik 1935 (in Ukrainian). Lviv. 1935. p. 172.
- Dumin, Osyp (1936). Istoriia Lehionu Ukrainskykh Sichovykh Striltsiv. 1914–1918 (in Ukrainian). Lviv: Chervona Kalyna. pp. 299–300, 333.
- "W okręgu Izby Adwokackiej we Lwowie. Przenieśli siedziby". Dziennik Urzędowy Ministerstwa Sprawiedliwości (in Polish) (8): 115. 1938.
- Hutsal, Petro (2019). "Krasnopera Severyn Yosypovych". Zakhidno-Ukrainska Narodna Respublika 1918–1923. Entsyklopediia (in Ukrainian). Vol. 2: Z–O. Ivano-Frankivsk: Manuskrypt-Lviv. p. 318. ISBN 978-966-2067-61-3.
- Kuzma, Oleksa (1960). Lystopadovi dni 1918 r. iz shkitsamy (in Ukrainian). New York: Chervona Kalyna. pp. 186–187.
- "Politychnyi protses u Zolochevi. Promovy oborontsiv. Verdykt. Dva prysudy smerty". Nash Prapor (in Ukrainian). No. 31 (628). Lviv. 1938. p. 4.
- "Po nashykh selakh i mistakh. Pratsia Filii «Prosvity» v Novim Seli". Nash Prapor (in Ukrainian). No. 65 (801). Lviv. 1939. p. 2.
- Ripetskyi, Stepan (1995). Ukrainske sichove striletstvo (in Ukrainian). Lviv. p. 170.
- Stetsyshyn, O. L. (2025). Ofitserskyi korpus armii Zakhidno-Ukrainskoi Narodnoi Respubliky: natsionalnyi ta terytorialnyi zriz (PhD) (in Ukrainian). Lviv: Ivan Franko National University of Lviv. p. 146.
- Szematyzm Królestwa Galicyi i Lodomeryi z Wielkiem Księstwem Krakowskiem na rok 1914 (PDF) (in Polish). Lwów. 1914. pp. 97, 100.
- "Todesfälle". Tiroler Tageszeitung (in German). No. 181. 9 August 1946. p. 4.
- Tynchenko, Yaroslav (2016). Nahorodna sprava uriadiv Ukrainskoi Narodnoi Respubliky, 1917–1992 (PhD) (in Ukrainian). Kyiv: Institute of History of Ukraine, NAS of Ukraine. pp. 76, 88, 124.
- "XV. Rozporiad z dnia 1 sichnia 1919" (PDF). Vistnyk Derzhavnoho Sekretariatu Viiskovykh Sprav (in Ukrainian) (5). Stanyslaviv: 2. 31 January 1919.
- Yarema, S., ed. (1998). Yuvileina knyha ukrainskoi himnazii v Ternopoli 1898–1998. Do storichchia zasnuvannia (in Ukrainian). Ternopil; Lviv: Shevchenko Scientific Society. p. 483.
- Kalendar «Za narod» na 1943 rik (PDF) (in Ukrainian). Lviv: Ukrainske vydavnytstvo. 1943. p. 174.
- Zvit dyrektsyi ts.k. gimnazyi Frants-Yosyfa I v Ternopoly za rik shkilnyi: 1905/1906 (in Ukrainian). Ternopil. 1906. p. 54.
