= Melitopol railway station =

Railway station in Melitopol, Zaporizhzhia Oblast, Ukraine

Coordinates: 46.86798°N 35.35636°E

Melitopol
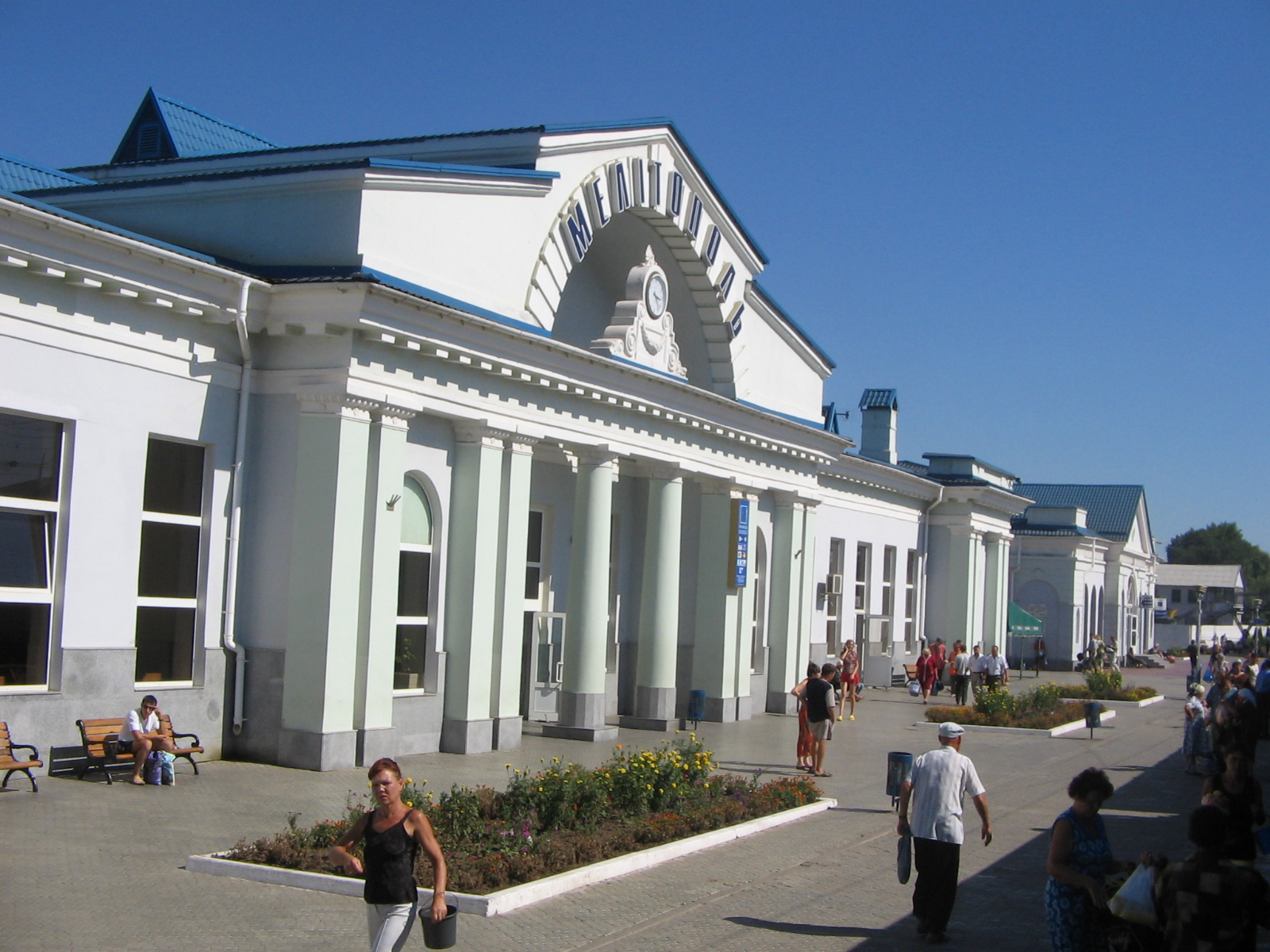
- View of the station from platform 1.

General information
- Location: Melitopol, disputed between Zaporizhzhia, Ukraine and Zaporozhye, Russia
- System: Near-Dnipro Railway terminal
- Operator: Prydnipro Railways (de jure); Railways of Novorossiya (de facto)
- Platforms: 3
- Tracks: 6

Construction
- Parking: yes

Other information
- Station code: 47600

History
- Opened: 1874

Services
Preceding station	Ukrainian Railways	Following station
De jure part of Prydnipro Railways, de facto operated by Novorossiya Railway
Fedorivka Terminus	Fedorivka–Novooleksiivka	Tashchenak toward Novooleksiivka or Henichesk
Terpinnya One-way operation	Fedorivka–Novooleksiivka	Tashchenak toward Novooleksiivka or Henichesk
Location

Melitopol railway station (Ukrainian: Мелітополь; Russian: Мелитополь) is a railway station in the Ukrainian city Melitopol of Zaporizhzhia Oblast currently under Russian occupation. It is currently operated by Railways of Novorossiya.

== History ==
The station opened in 1874, simultaneously with the opening of the railway. The Aleksandrovsk – Melitopol line came into operation on 28 June and the Melitopol – Simferopol line in October 1874.

During the Russian civil war one of the buildings of the station was used as the headquarters of the commander of the Southern front Mikhail Frunze.

During the Eastern Front (World War II) in October 1943 the building was destroyed, and for the next 10 years, the duties of the station was performed by small kiosks, located on the site of the current trunk.

In 1955 a new building was constructed. The opening of the station was planned on 7 November to commemorate the October coup, however, the builders failed to meet the deadline, and the station was commissioned on 4 December.

The station platforms held monuments of Stalin and Lenin, the first was quickly removed however the second remained on the platform until the 1990s, and then was moved to Pryvokzalna Square and finally taken down 2015.

This station along with the entire city of Melitopol was captured and later annexed by Russia in 2022 during the invasion of Ukraine.

== Trains ==
- Kyiv – Novooleksievka
- Kharkiv – Novooleksievka
- Dnipro – Novooleksievka

== Gallery ==
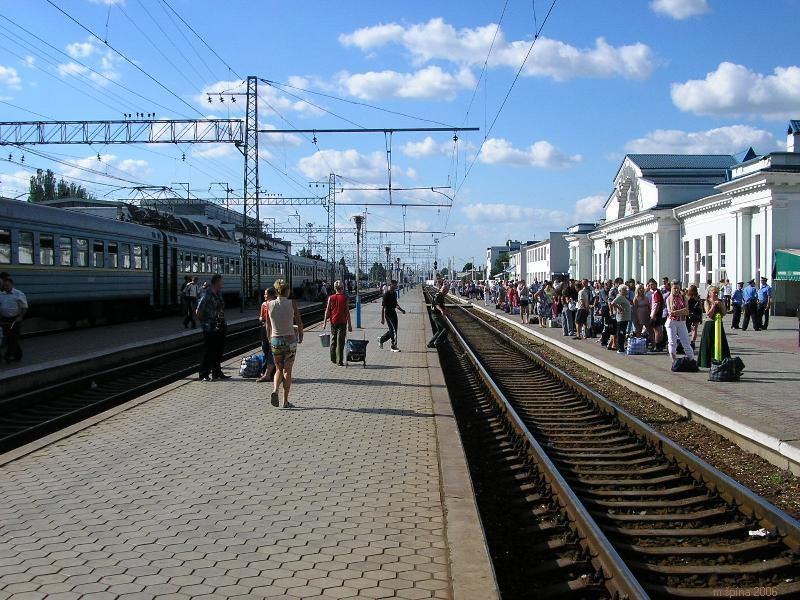

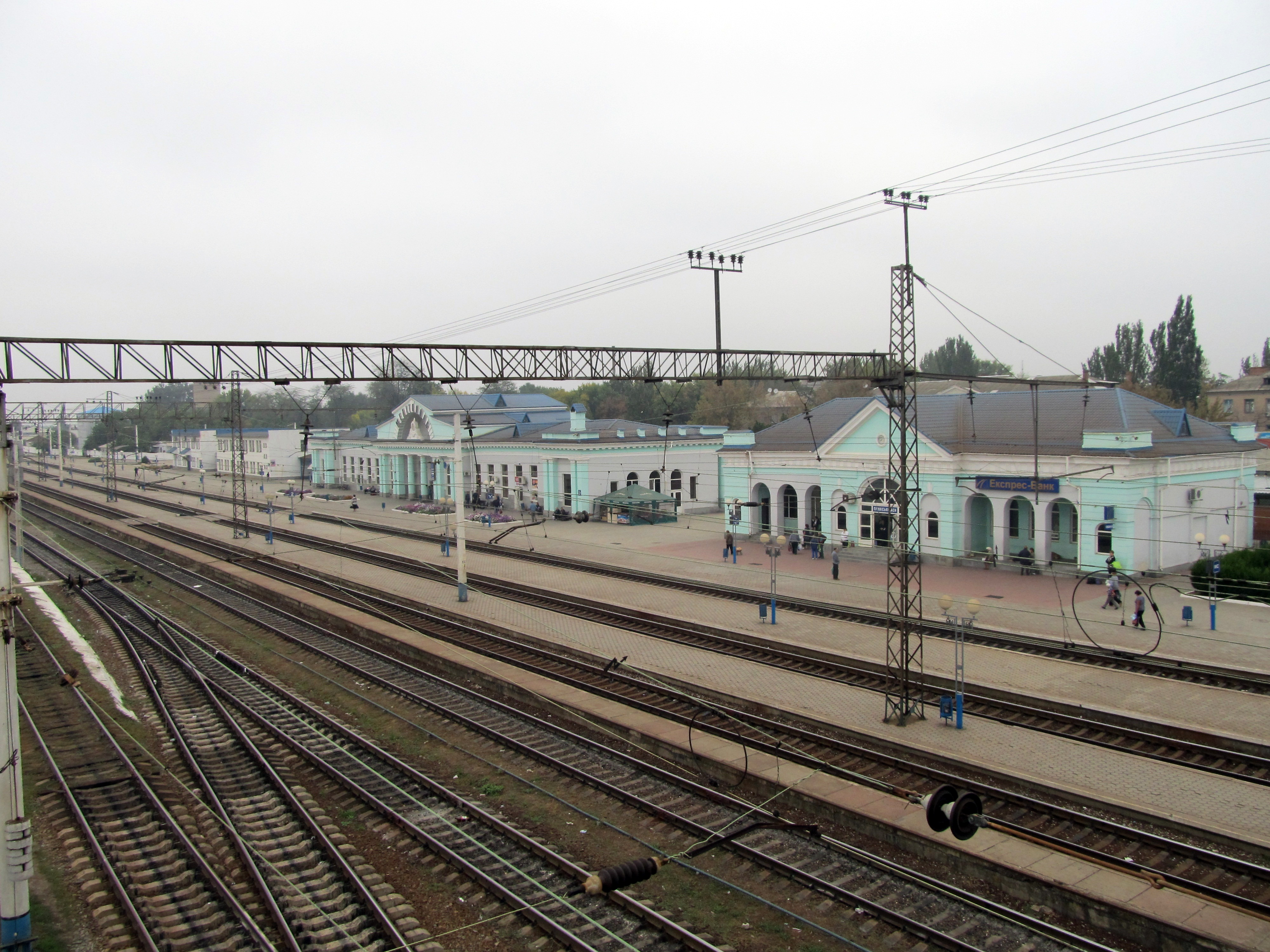

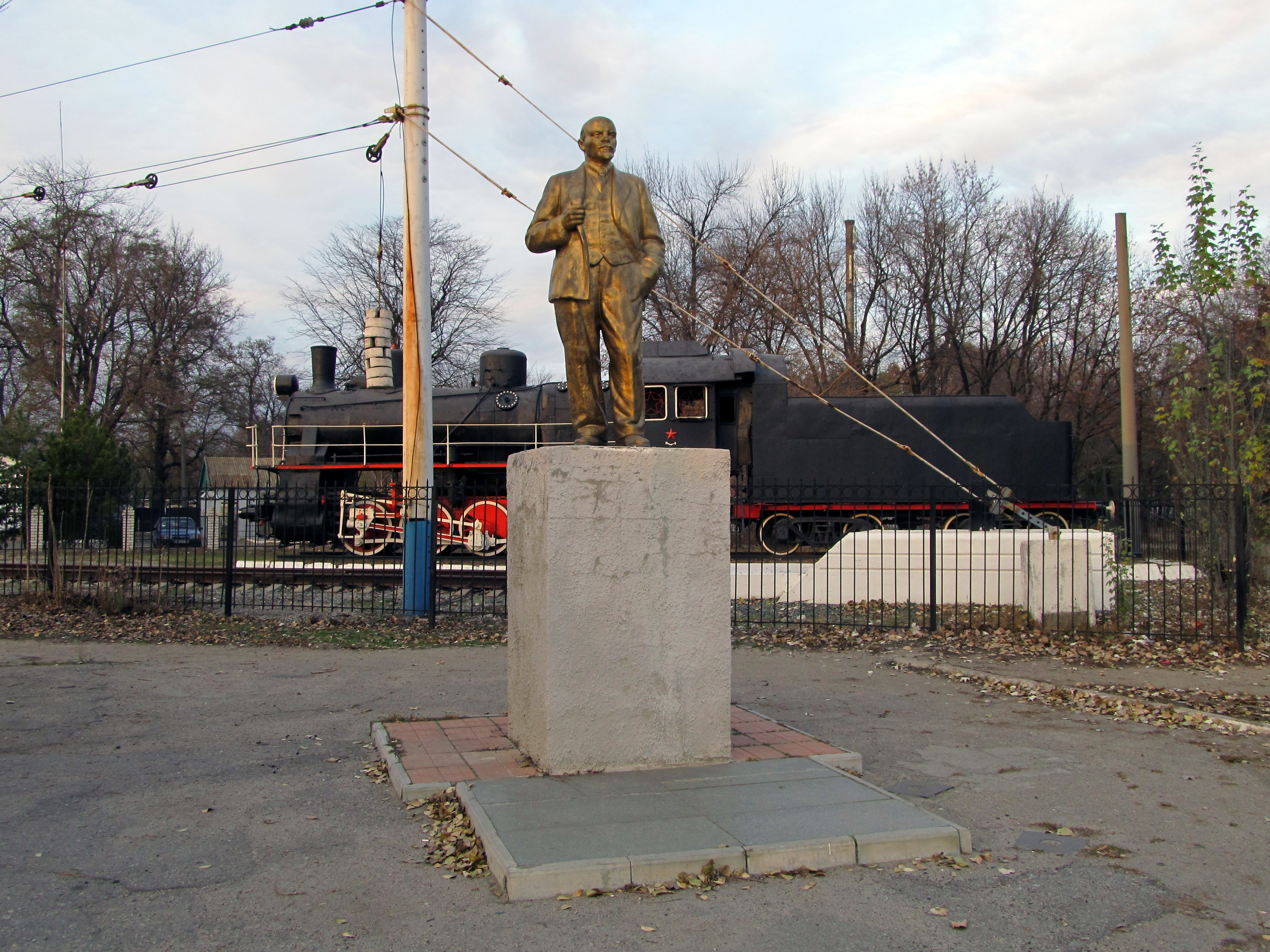
statue of Lenin on Pryvokzalna Square, since removed in 2015

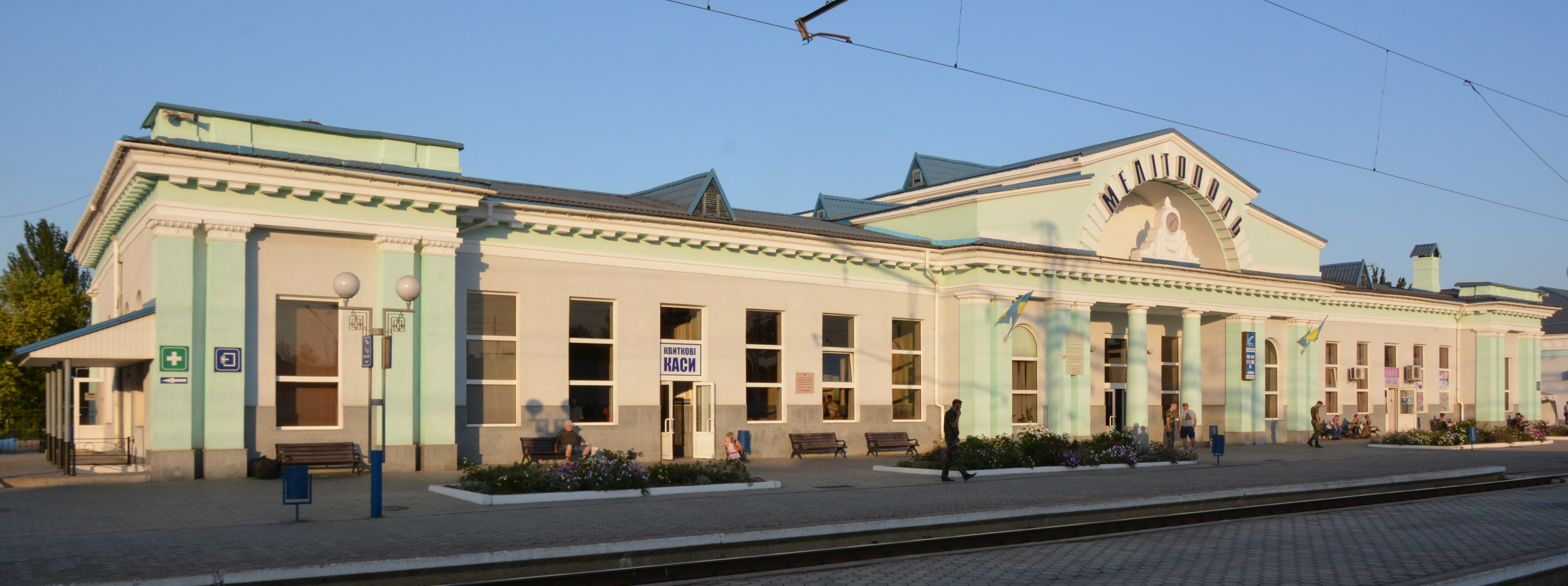
Main facade from the city side
