= Melitopol (disambiguation) =

Melitopol is a city and a municipality in the eponymous raion in Zaporizhzhia Oblast of Ukraine.

Melitopol may also refer to:

== Places ==
- Melitopol Raion, Zaporizhzhia, Ukraine
- Melitopol railway station, Melitopol, Melitopol, Melitopol, Zaporizhzhia, Ukraine
- Melitopol Air Base, Melitopol, Zaporizhzhia, Ukraine

== Other uses ==
- Melitopol Motor Factory (MeMZ), a manufacturer of engines
- Battle of Melitopol (2022), in the Russian invasion of Ukraine

== See also ==
- Melitopol Offensive, in WWII
