= Dilo =

Dilo may refer to:

== People ==
- Christopher Dilo (born 1994), French footballer
- Dilo Doxan (born 1984), Kurdish Syrian musician

== Places ==
- Dilo, Bourgogne-Franche-Comté, France, former commune now part of Arces-Dilo
- Dilo River, Gabon

== Other ==
- Dilo oil tree, also known as Calophyllum inophyllum
- Dilo (tribe)

== See also ==
- Day in the life of (disambiguation)
