= Luhansk railway station =

Railway station in Luhansk

Coordinates: 48.5757°N 39.2879°E

Luhansk
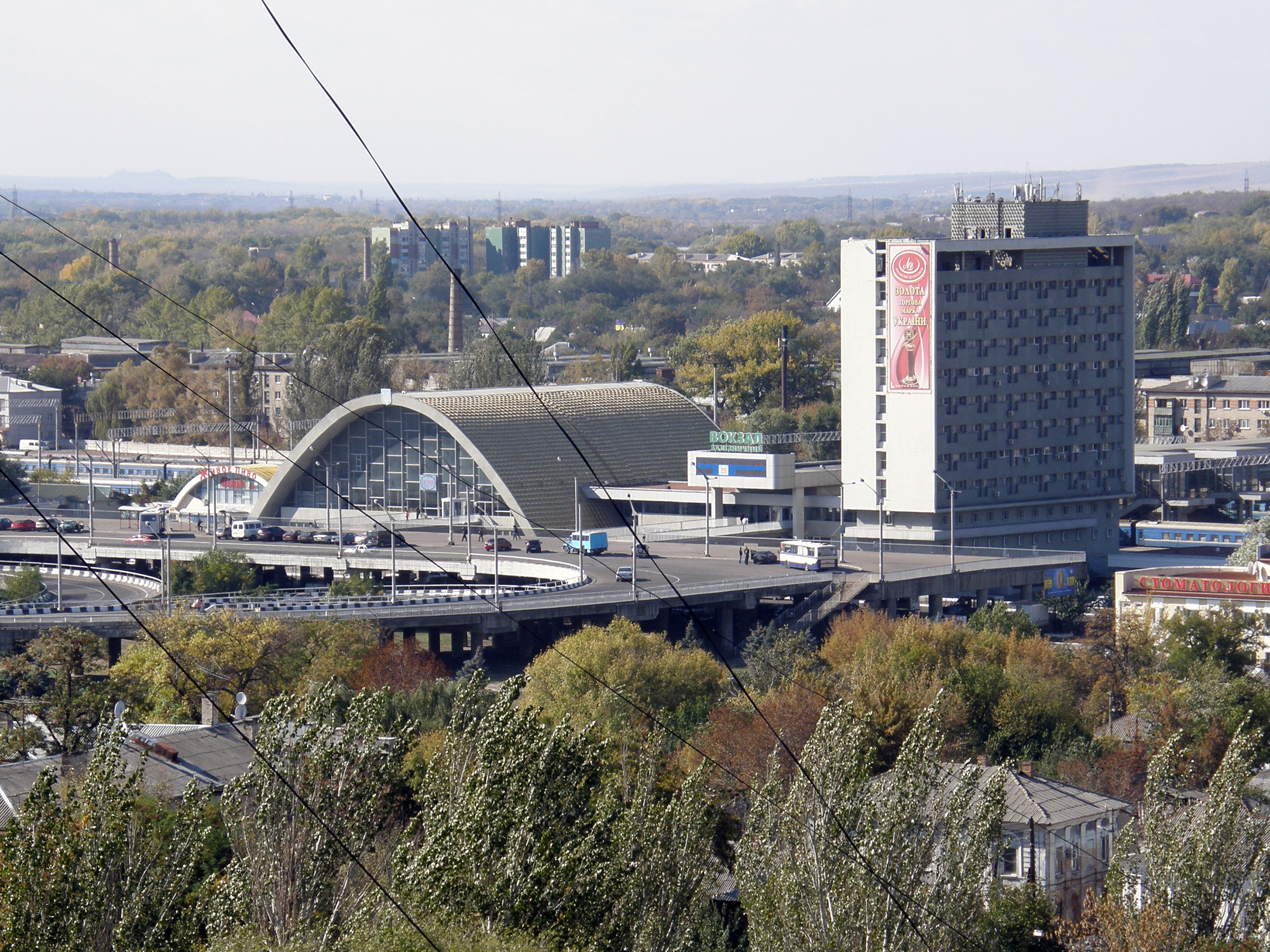
- Luhansk station before the Russo-Ukrainian War (2012).

General information
- Location: Kirov St. / Viktor Pyaterkin St., Luhansk
- System: Luhansk Railway terminal
- Operator: De jure: Ukrainian Railways; De facto: Russian Railways; Novorossiya Railway
- Platforms: 3 main + 5 additional
- Tracks: 7

Construction
- Parking: yes

Other information
- Station code: 84890

History
- Opened: 1878
- Former names: Voroshilovgrad

Services
Preceding station	Ukrainian Railways	Following station
De jure part of Donets Railway, de facto operated by Novorossiya Railway
2 km toward Yasynuvata	Yasynuvata–Luhansk	Terminus
REP toward Manuilivka	Manuilivka–Luhansk	Terminus
Suspended services (pre-2014)
Preceding station	Ukrainian Railways	Following station
2 km toward Debaltseve	Debaltseve–Luhansk	Terminus
Terminus	Luhansk–Illienko	12 km toward Illienko
Location

Luhansk railway station is a junction railway station in Luhansk, Ukraine. It is currently operated by Railways of Novorossiya.

== History ==
The history of the station began in 1878 with the opening ceremony of the Donetsk coal railway, which covered 389 miles, crossing open areas such as Mykytivka (in Horlivka) –Debaltseve–Dovzhanska, Debaltseve, Popasna–Kramatorsk and Donetsk–Luhansk, which came to Luhansk from the Southwest.

The Donetsk Railway was managed from Luhansk until 1934, when the office moved to Donetsk.

== Trains ==
Because of the Russo-Ukrainian War, all the long-distance trains ceased operating and only 2 restored trains, operated by the Luhansk People's Republic, continue to terminate at the station:

- Yasynuvata – Luhansk (via Donetsk)
- Luhansk – Manuilivka (in Zorynsk, 3 times a day)

In May 2024, the Yasinovataya-Luhansk train service was resumed up to the Makeevka station.

== Photos ==
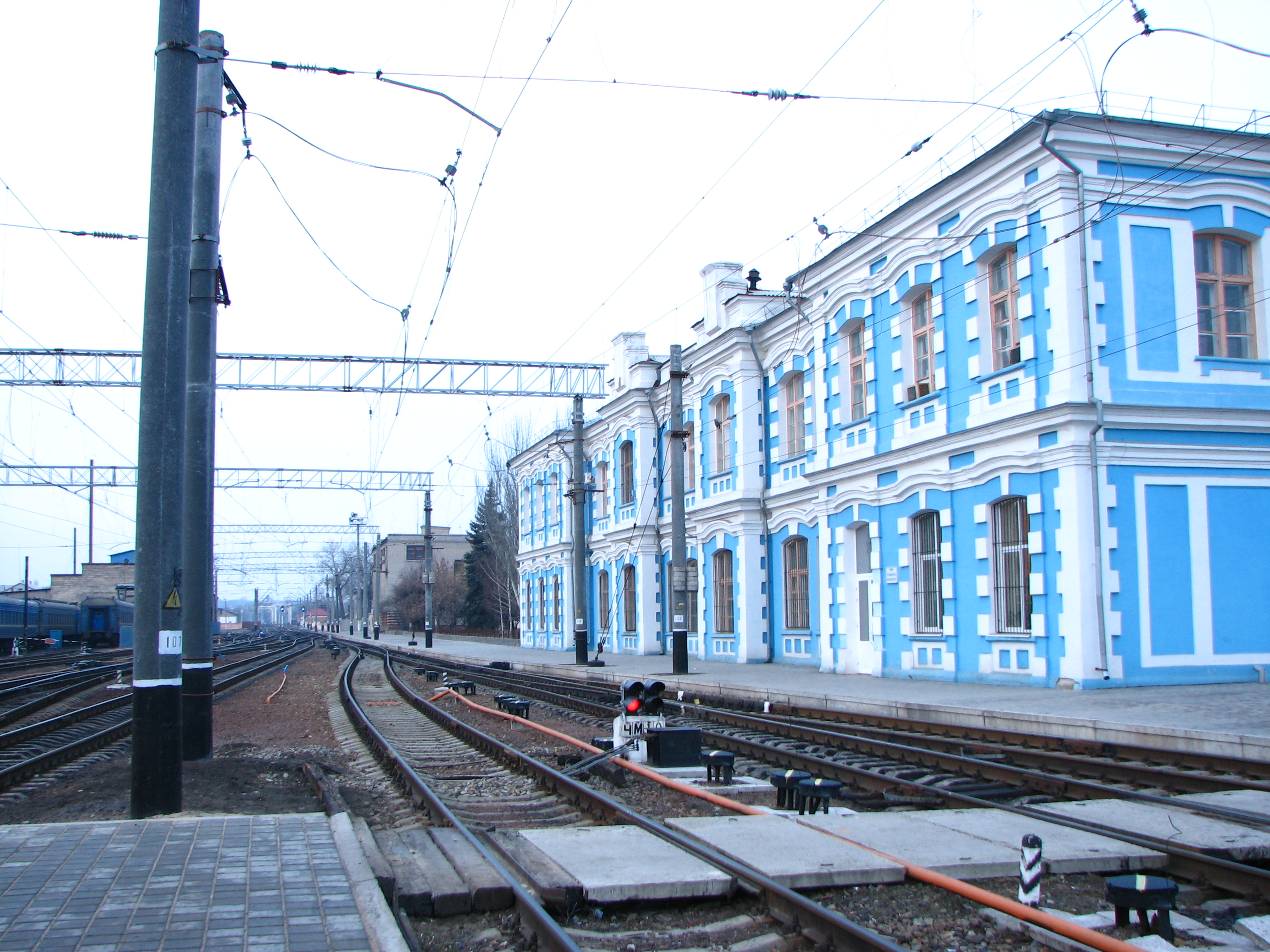
Old station

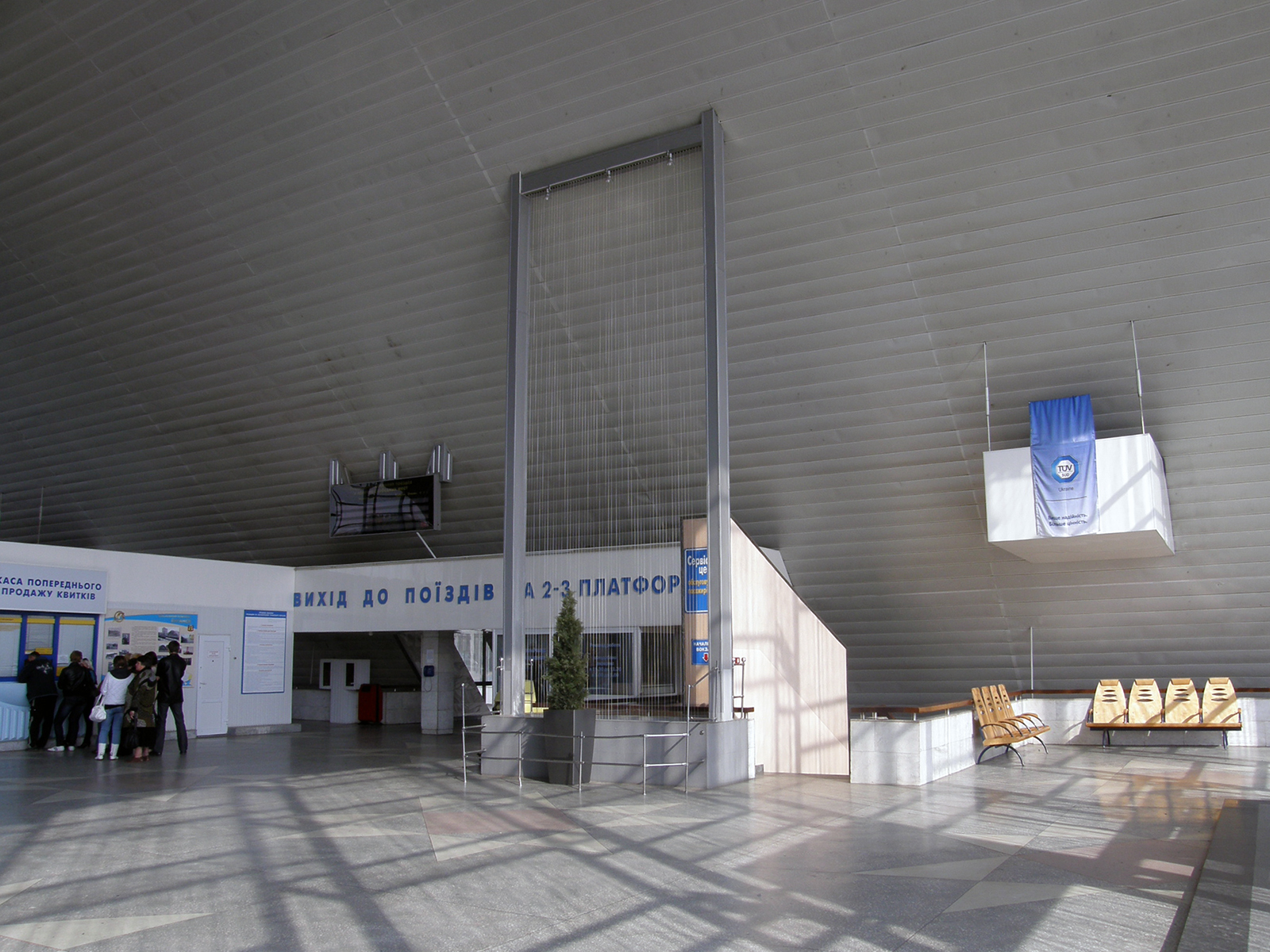
New station

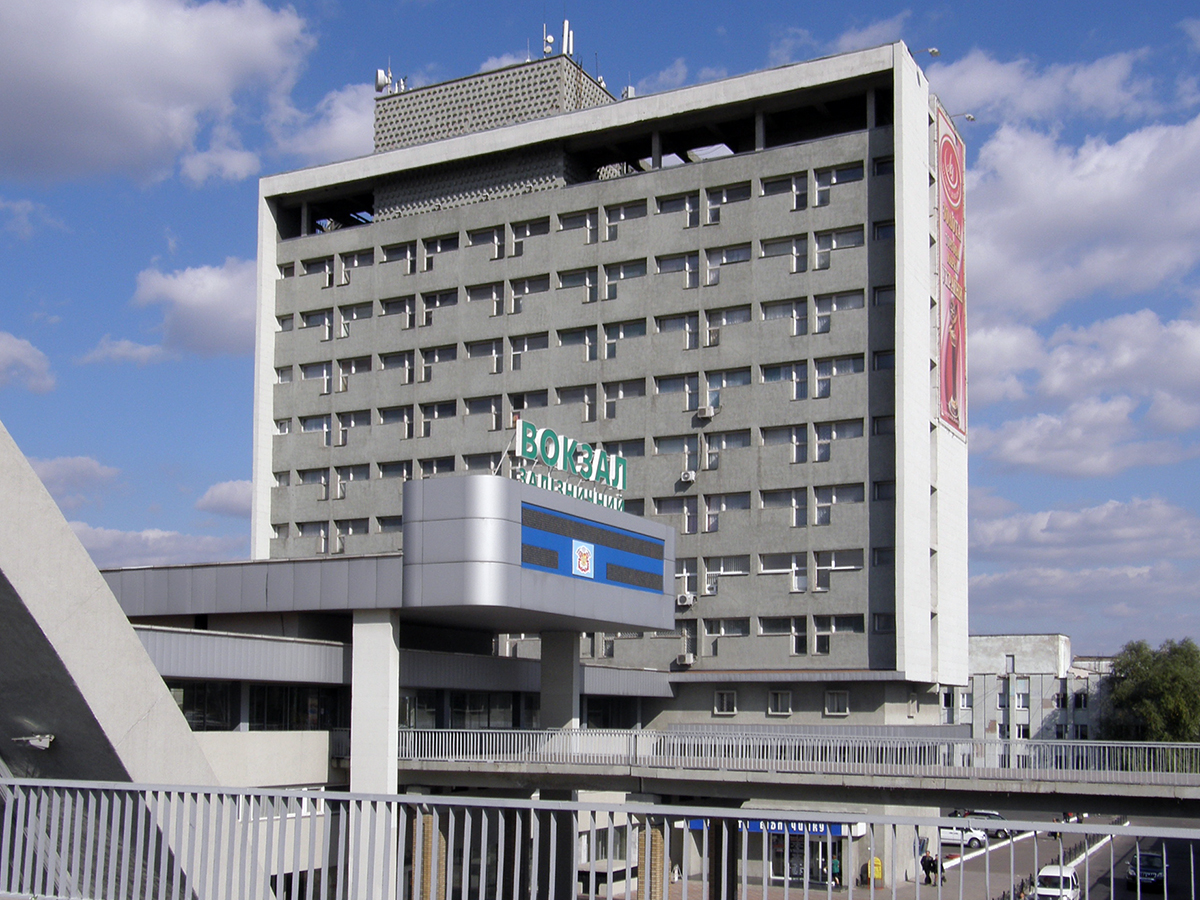
Hotel
