= Pidzamche railway station =

Railway station in Lviv, Ukraine

Pidzamche Підзамче

General information
- Location: Lviv, vul. Ohirkova, 1 Ukraine
- Coordinates: 49°51′04″N 24°02′02″E
- Owner: Lviv Railways
- Operator: Ukrainian Railways
- Lines: Lviv — Sokal; Lviv — Krasne; Lviv — Zolochiv; Lviv — Brody
- Platforms: 2
- Tracks: 4
- Connections: tram route 6, bus routes 9 & 20

Construction
- Architect: Stanisław Rybicki
- Architectural style: Renaissance Revival

Other information
- Station code: ЄМР (АСУЗТ) 370203 Експрес-3 2218215

History
- Opened: 12 July 1869
- Rebuilt: 1908—1909, 1945—1947
- Electrified: 1966
Location

Pidzamche railway station (also known as Lviv-Pidzamche) is a railway station of the Lviv Railways located in Lviv, 7 km away from the city's main railway terminal. Officially considered a freight station, it is nevertheless served by all passing suburban trains, as well as several long-distance trains.

== History ==
The station got its name from the Lviv High Castle hill (Ukrainian: Замкова гора) at the foot of which the station is located. Part of the station is built on top of a former cemetery.

The original station building was damaged in the Polish–Ukrainian War of 1918–1919, and even more so in World War II. The remains of the original building now house the railway offices, whereas the current two-storey passenger hall with the big central avant-corps is a post-WWII reconstruction based on the original designs.

A memorial plaque on the station building commemorates the bodies of 602 victims of the Soviet famine of 1946–47 which were discovered near the station during reconstruction works in the 2000s.

== Operations ==
Between 1 December 2009 and 15 June 2010, Pidzamche railway station was one of the two termini of Lviv City Railbus, which was then discontinued for unprofitability.

Until 2016, none of the passing long-distance trains served the station. Over 2016, the schedules of three long-distance trains were amended to include a stop at Pidzamche: № 92/91 (Lviv — Kyiv), № 705/706 (Kyiv — Przemyśl), and № 743/744 (Lviv — Darnytsia). On 12 July 2017, seven more long-distance trains were scheduled to stop at the station.

Since 2017, the station has been served by six daily long-distance trains (Lviv — Odesa, Dnipro — Truskavets, Lviv — Kyiv, Kyiv — Przemyśl, Lviv — Darnytsia railway station) and three that run every other day (Lviv — Novooleksiivka and Lviv — Kharkiv). In addition to the long-distance trains, the station is served by four daily regional services (Lviv — Rivne and Lviv — Kivertsi).
