= Izvaryne railway station =

Railway station in Ukraine

Coordinates: 48°16′52.5″N 39°53′31.4″E

Izvaryne (Ukrainian: Ізварине) is a railway station that is located in a town of Izvaryne, Krasnodon city, Luhansk Oblast in Ukraine. It is part of the Luhansk administration (Donetsk Railways).

The station is an important transportation gateway to Ukraine. The station serves freight and local passengers trains. Among the services provided at the station is only embarkment and disembarkment of passengers for commuter lines.

Previous station	Operator	Next Station
Honcharivka	Donetsk Railways	Russia
