= A Day in the Life (disambiguation) =

"A Day in the Life" is a 1967 song by the Beatles.

A Day in the Life may also refer to:

== Film and television ==
- A Day in the Life (film), a 2009 American musical crime film by Sticky Fingaz
- A Day in the Life (TV series), a 2011–2013 American documentary series featuring Morgan Spurlock
- "A Day in the Life" (Alvin and the Chipmunks), a 1989 TV episode
- "A Day in the Life" (Battlestar Galactica), a 2007 TV episode
- "A Day in the Life" (Spider-Man), a 2017 TV episode
- "A Day in the Life" (Without a Trace), a 2005 TV episode

== Music ==
- A Day in the Life (band), an American rock band that became Hawthorne Heights

=== Albums ===
- A Day in the Life (Eric Benét album), 1999
- A Day in the Life (Jane Siberry album), 1997
- A Day in the Life (Wes Montgomery album), 1967
- A Day in the Life: A Pokadelick Adventure, by Kwamé, 1990
- Help!: A Day in the Life, a charity compilation produced by War Child, 2005
- A Day in the Life... by Beres Hammond, 1998

== Video games ==
- UFO: A Day in the Life, a 1999 adventure/puzzle video game
- A Day in the Life, a 1985 game for the 48K ZX Spectrum

== Other uses ==
- Day in the life, a kind of storytelling that presents a given day in the life of the subject
- Short Trips: A Day in the Life, a 2005 anthology of stories based on Doctor Who
- A Day in the Life, a series of photography books created by David Elliot Cohen and Rick Smolan

== See also ==
- One Day in the Life of Ivan Denisovich
- Life in a Day (disambiguation)
- List of works set within one day
