= Donetsk railway station =

Railway station in Donetsk, Ukraine

Donetsk
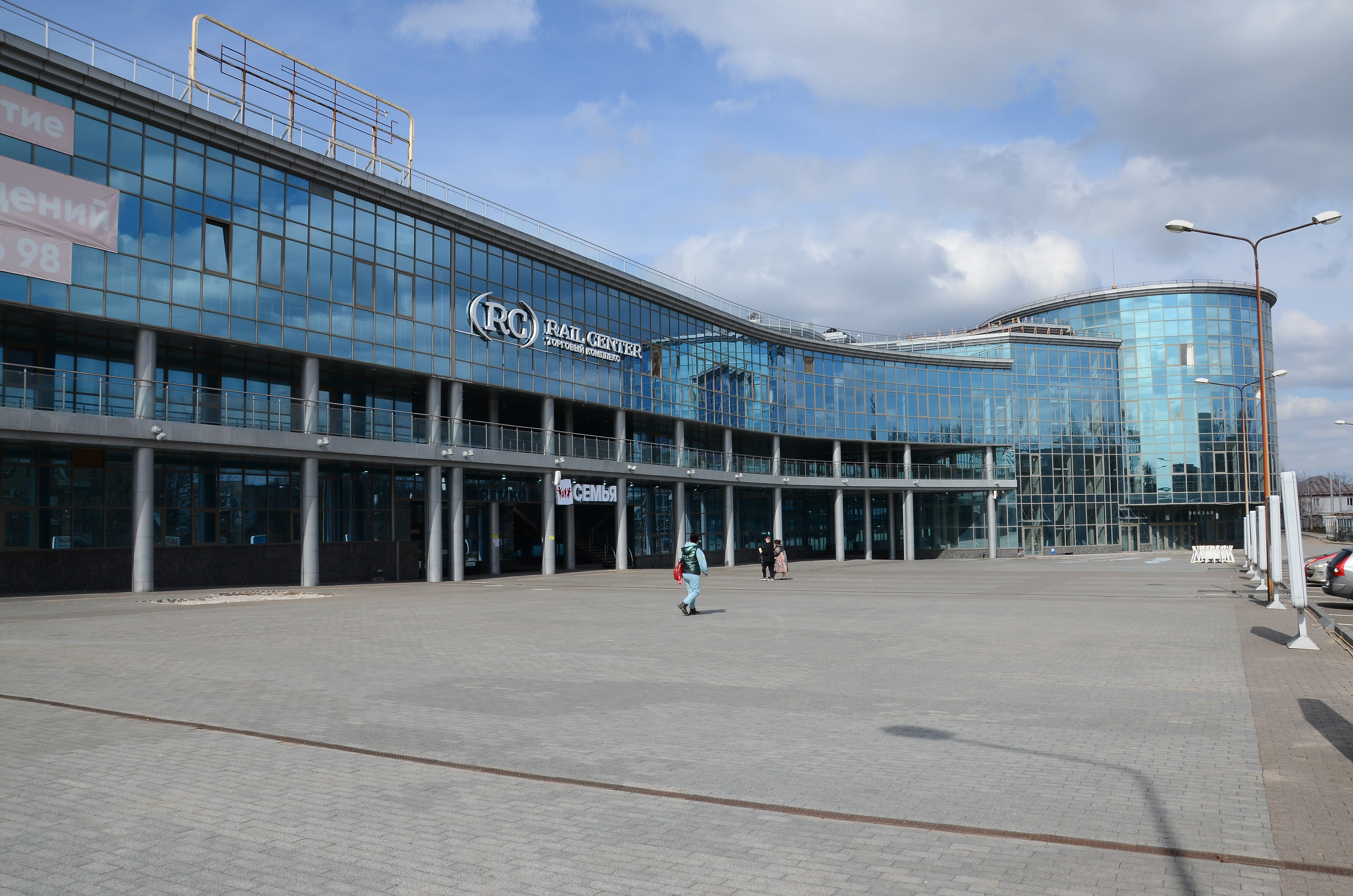
- Donetsk railway station in 2025

General information
- Location: Privokzalnaya Square, 3 Kyivskyi District, Donetsk
- Coordinates: 48.0439°N 37.7463°E
- System: Donetsk Railway terminal
- Operator: De jure: Ukrainian Railways; De facto: Russian Railways; Railways of Novorossiya
- Platforms: 5
- Tracks: 9

Construction
- Parking: yes

Other information
- Station code: 89720

History
- Opened: 1872; 154 years ago
- Rebuilt: 2012, 2023-2025

Services
Preceding station	Ukrainian Railways	Following station
De jure part of Donets Railway, de facto operated by Railways of Novorossiya
Terminus	Donetsk–Uspenskaya	Donetsk-North toward; Uspenskaya
Terminus	Donetsk–Debaltseve	Yasynuvata toward Debaltseve
Terminus	Donetsk–Yasynuvata	Yasynuvata Terminus
Suspended services
Preceding station	Ukrainian Railways	Following station
Kvartsytnyy toward Volnovakha	Volnovakha–Yasynuvata	12 km toward Yasynuvata
Terminus	Donetsk–447 km	11 km toward 447 km
Long-distance trains (pre-2014)
Mariupol Terminus	78/77	Makiivka toward Kyiv-Pasazhyrskyi
Mariupol Terminus	384/383	Makiivka toward Vitebsk
Location

Donetsk railway station is a railway station in Donetsk. It lies between Rutchenkove railway station to the south, and a junction towards Avdiivka on the northwest and Yasynuvata on the northeast, via Donetsk-Pivnichnyi railway station. It is currently operated by Railways of Novorossiya.

== History ==
In World War II the station building was completely destroyed. In 1951, the architect I. Vorontsov designed a new station, with a central hub and spurs. The lobby in the centre is key to its design. The station square was built in the 1960s.

The station houses a museum of the history of the Donetsk Railway, opened on 4 August 2000, on its 130th anniversary. Outside there is a statue to St. Nicholas, consecrated by the Russian Orthodox Church in late 2011. To accommodate the European Football Championship 2012 the station building was reconstructed and expanded, in a more modern style.

On 21 May 2012 a new building was commissioned. the New complex consists of main, commuter and transit platforms, two shopping malls, two concourses and a new bus station. The pedestrian overbridge was redesigned to be indoors with escalators. The whole of the station was redesigned with 15.8 km (9.8 mi) of new track, 83 new switches, and 417 electrical junctions, with 21 new signals.

There are around 200 lights, 25 km (16 mi) of signaling cable, 12 km (7.5 mi) of overhead line, upgrades to the two existing electrical substations and installation of two new ones.

In 2014 the station building was damaged during the War in Donbass.

On May 9, 2025, after 11 years of being closed, the Station finally reopened its lines along the Debaltseve-Donetsk route.

== Trains ==
No long-distance trains pass or terminate at Donetsk, because of the ongoing conflict. Four trains operated by the Donetsk People's Republic pass the station.

- Ilovaisk — Yasynuvata (via Donetsk)
- Donetsk — Uspenskaya (via Ilovaisk)
- Ilovaysk — Olenivka (via Donetsk)
- Yasynuvata — Luhansk (via Donetsk)

On 9 May 2025, the Railways of Novorossiya, a Russian state-owned company, plans to reintroduce railway service to Donetsk, including:

- Donetsk — Donetsk-North — Yasynuvata — Uspenskaya
- Donetsk — Donetsk-North — Yasynuvata
- Donetsk — Yasynuvata

== Gallery ==
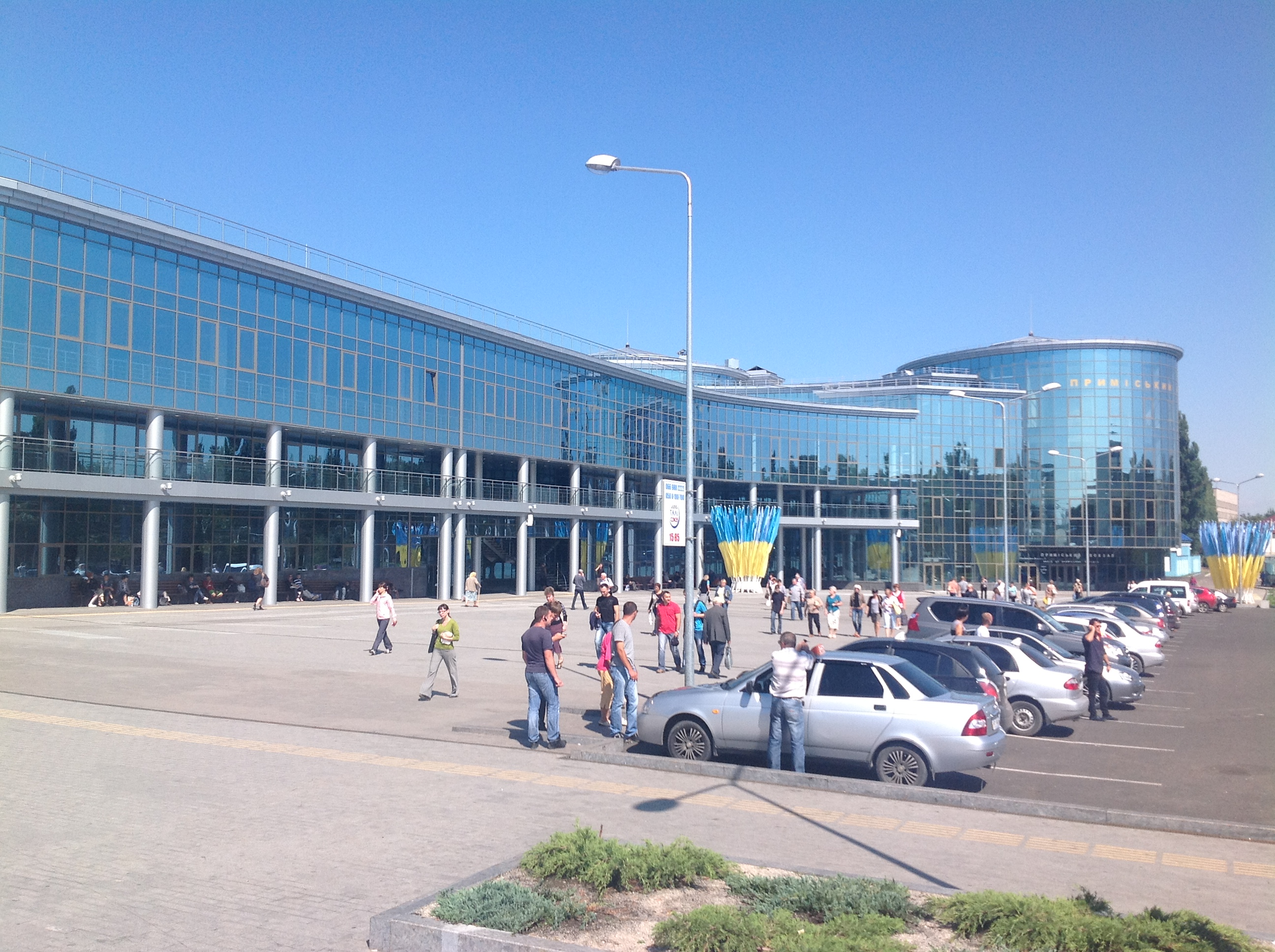

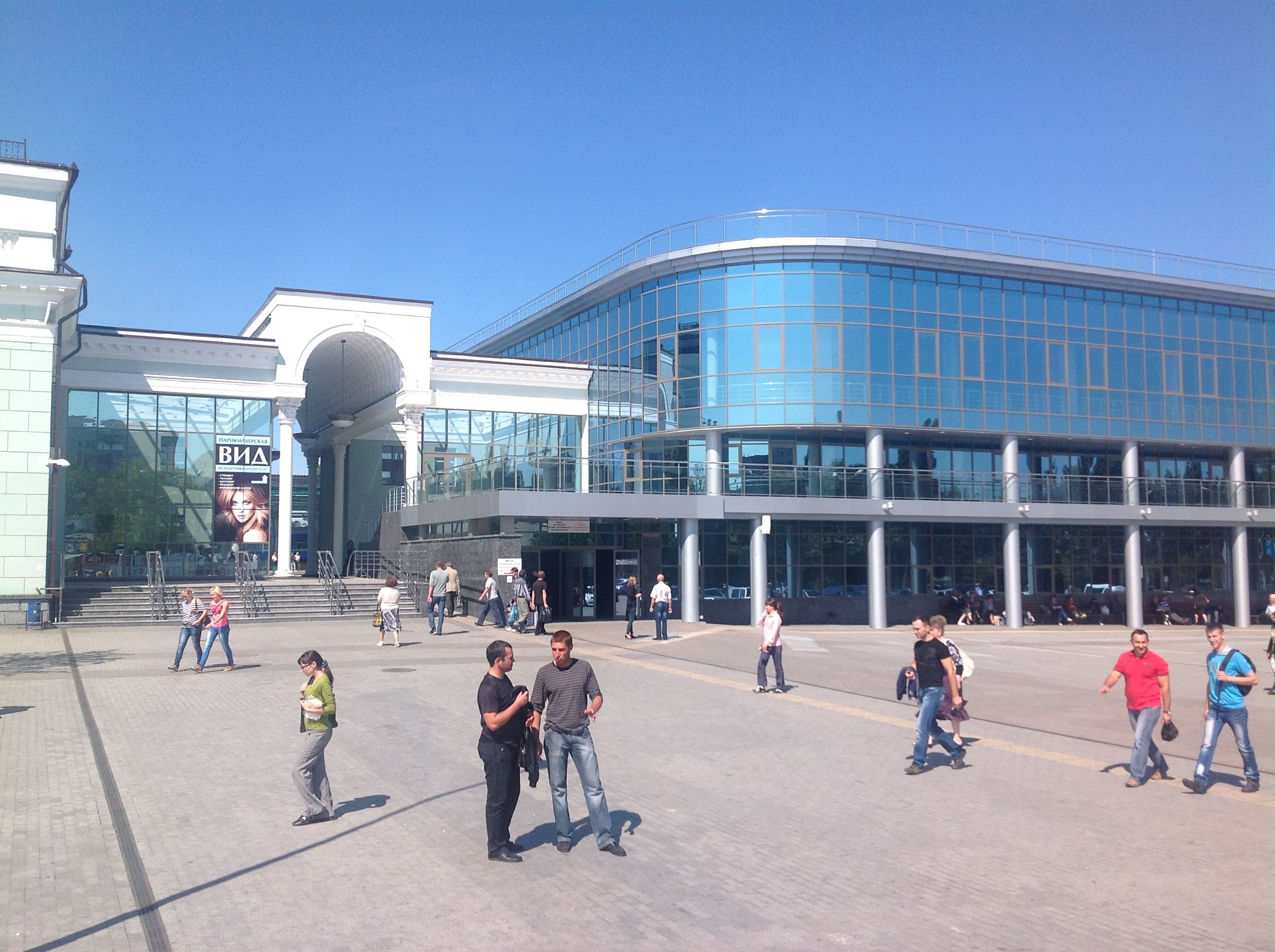
August 2012

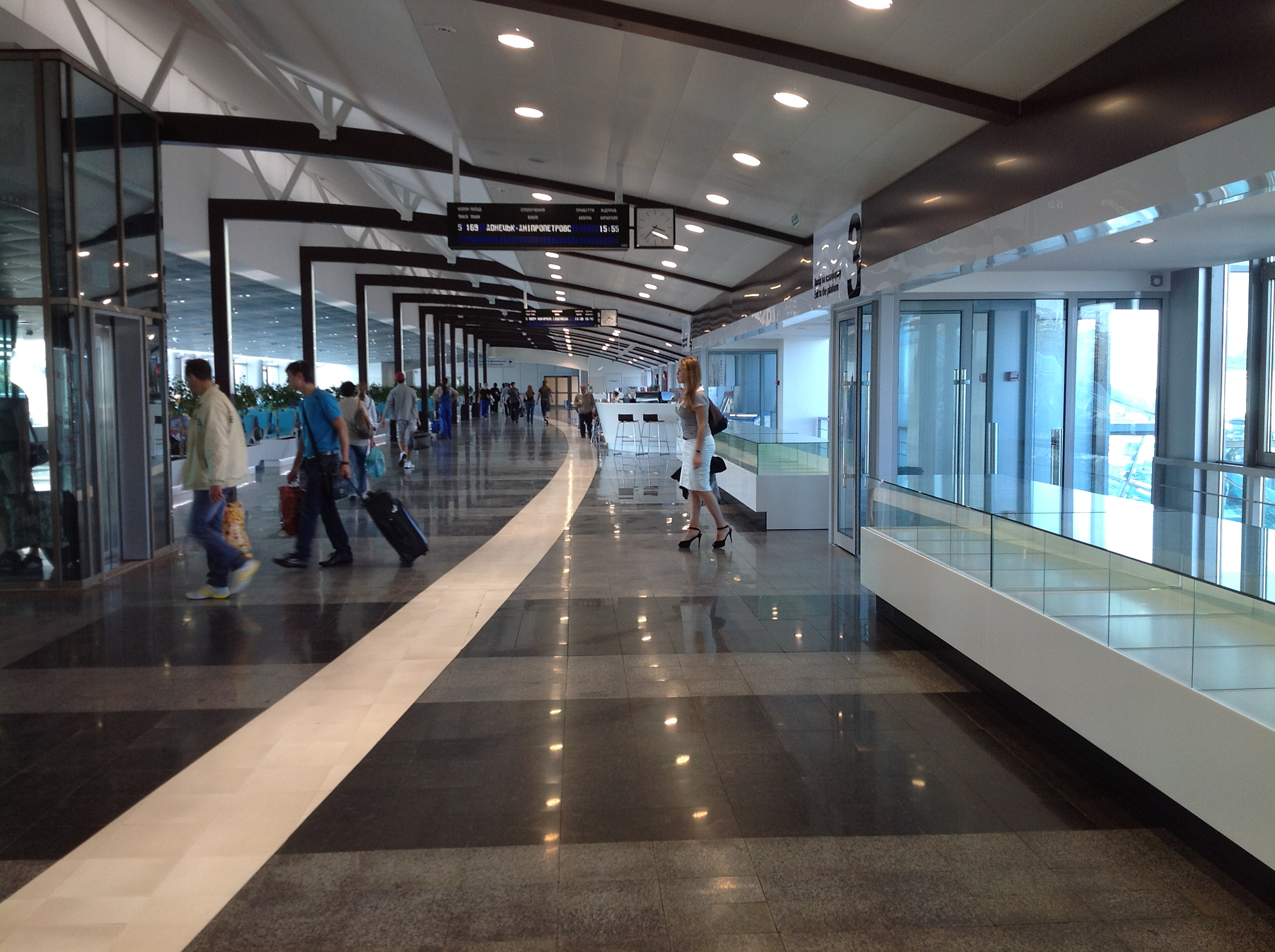
August 2012

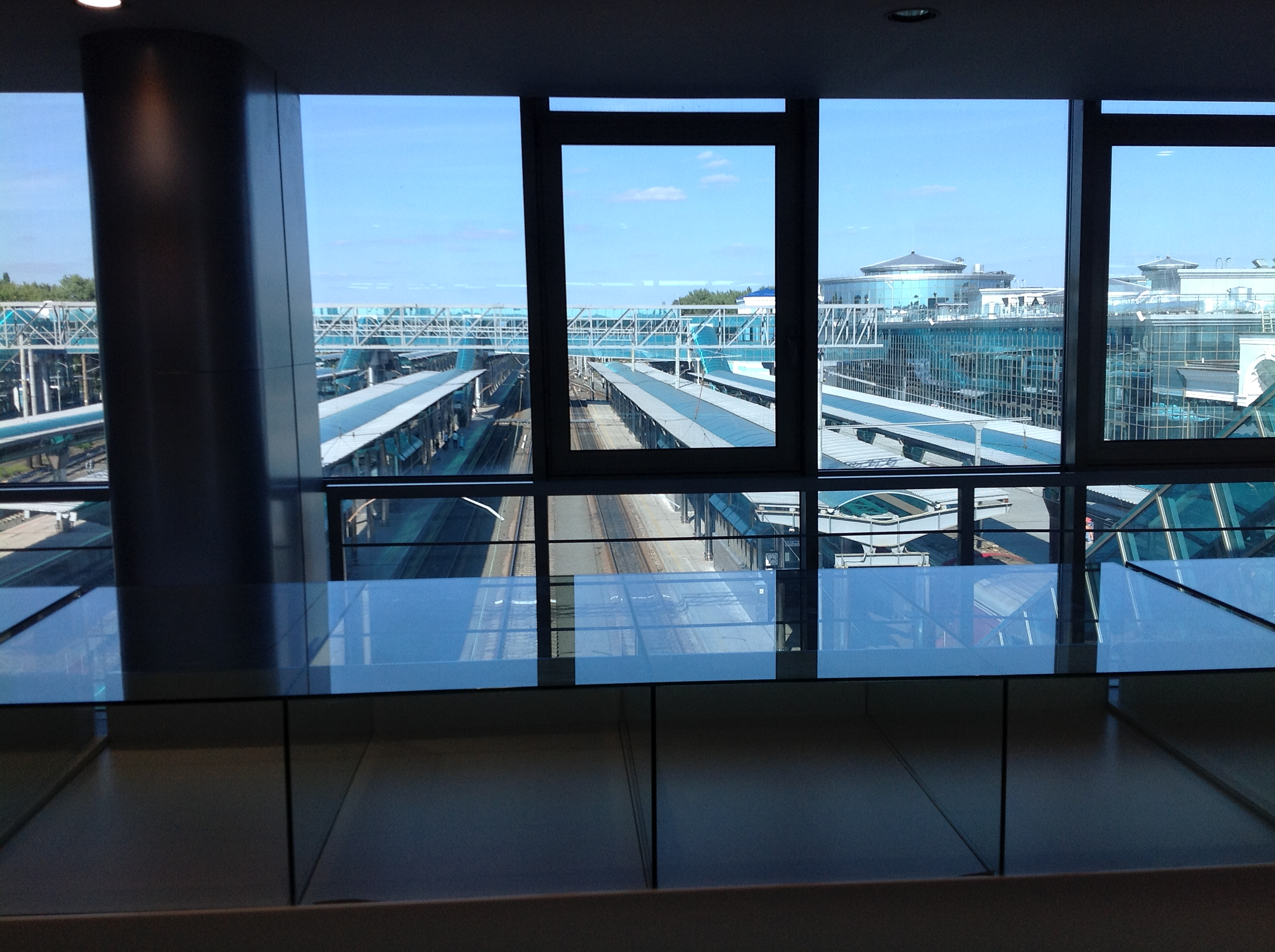

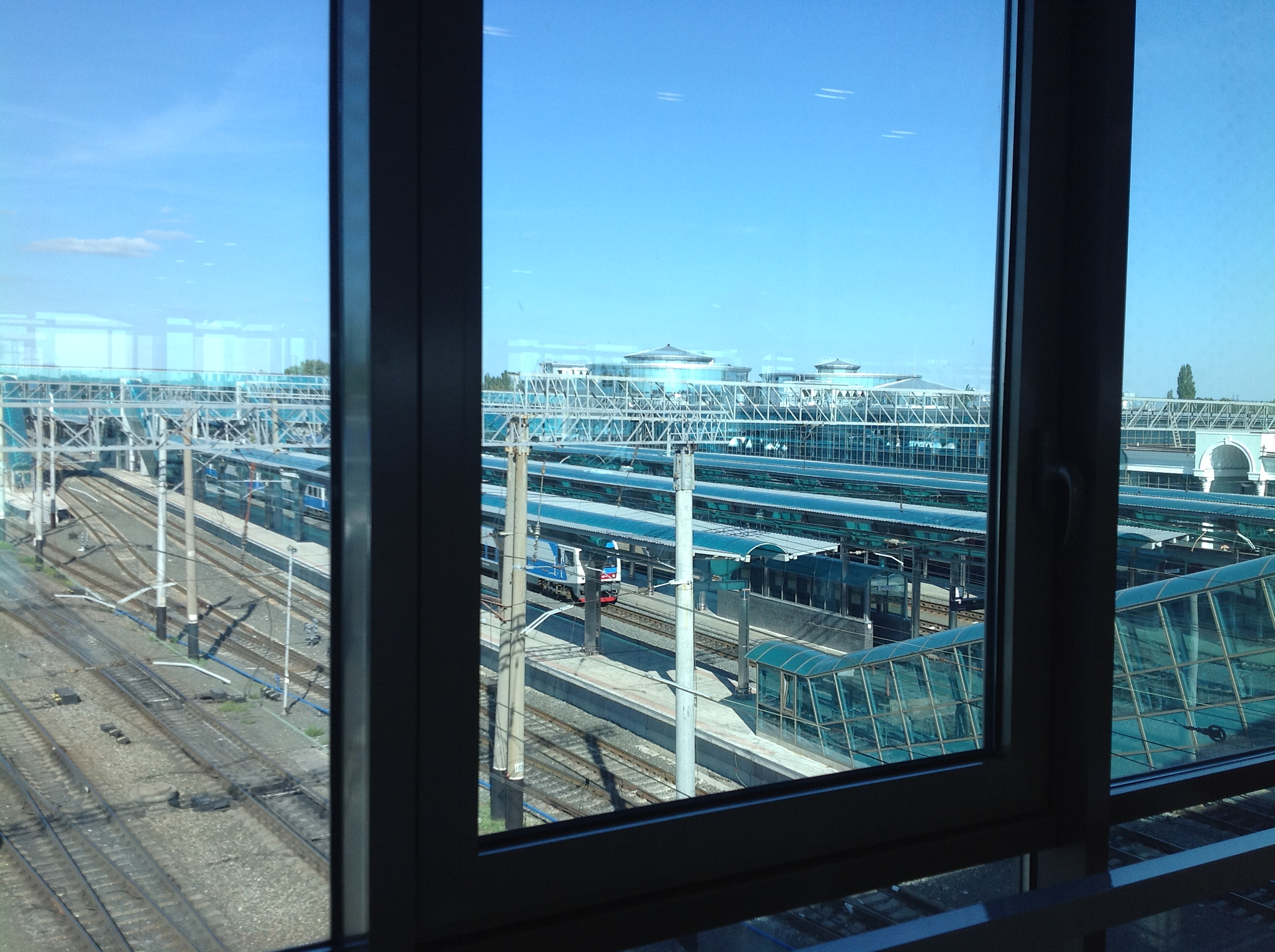
Another angle 2012

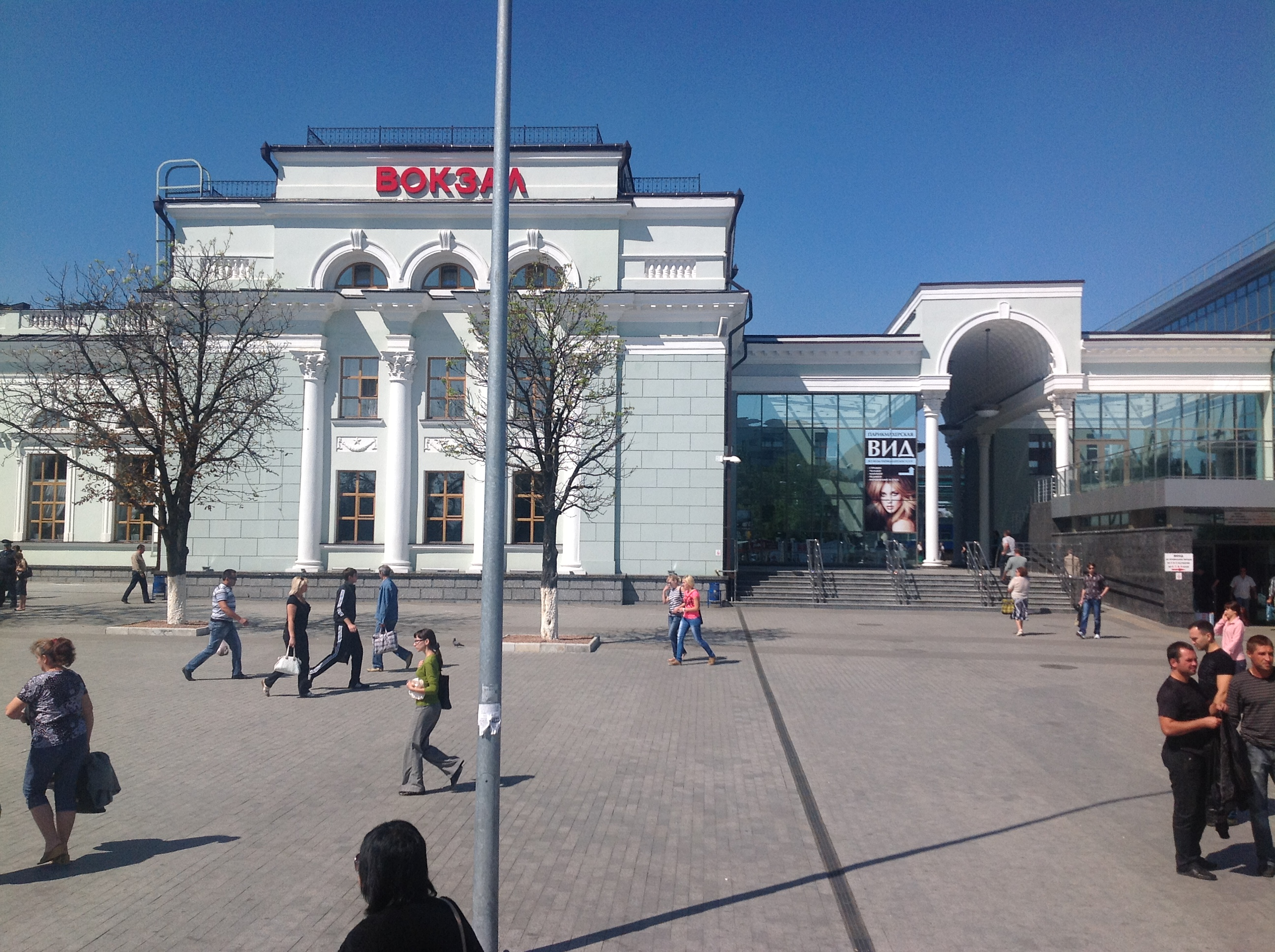
Outside the station 2012

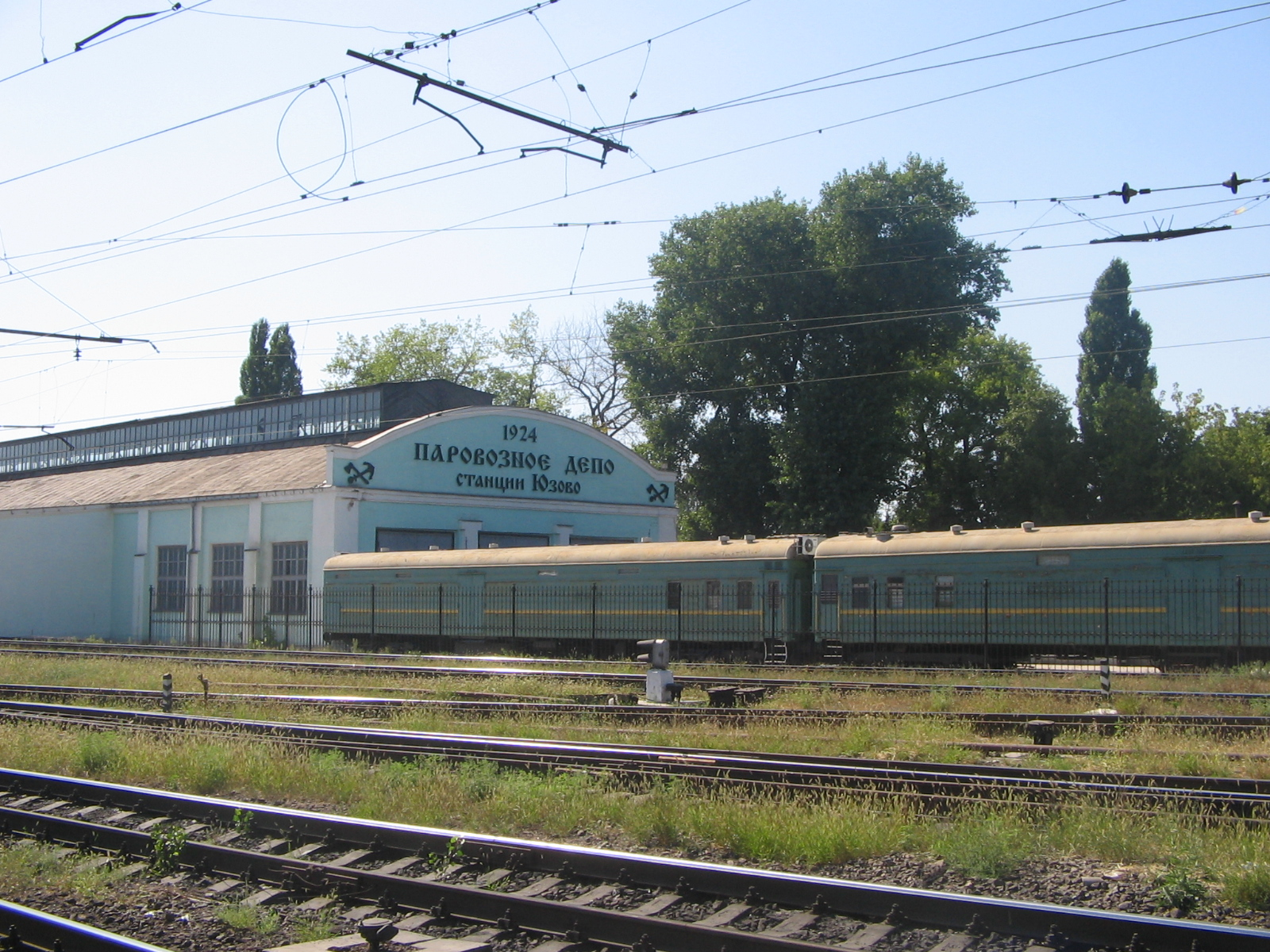
Railroad car shed built in 1924 which serves as a museum

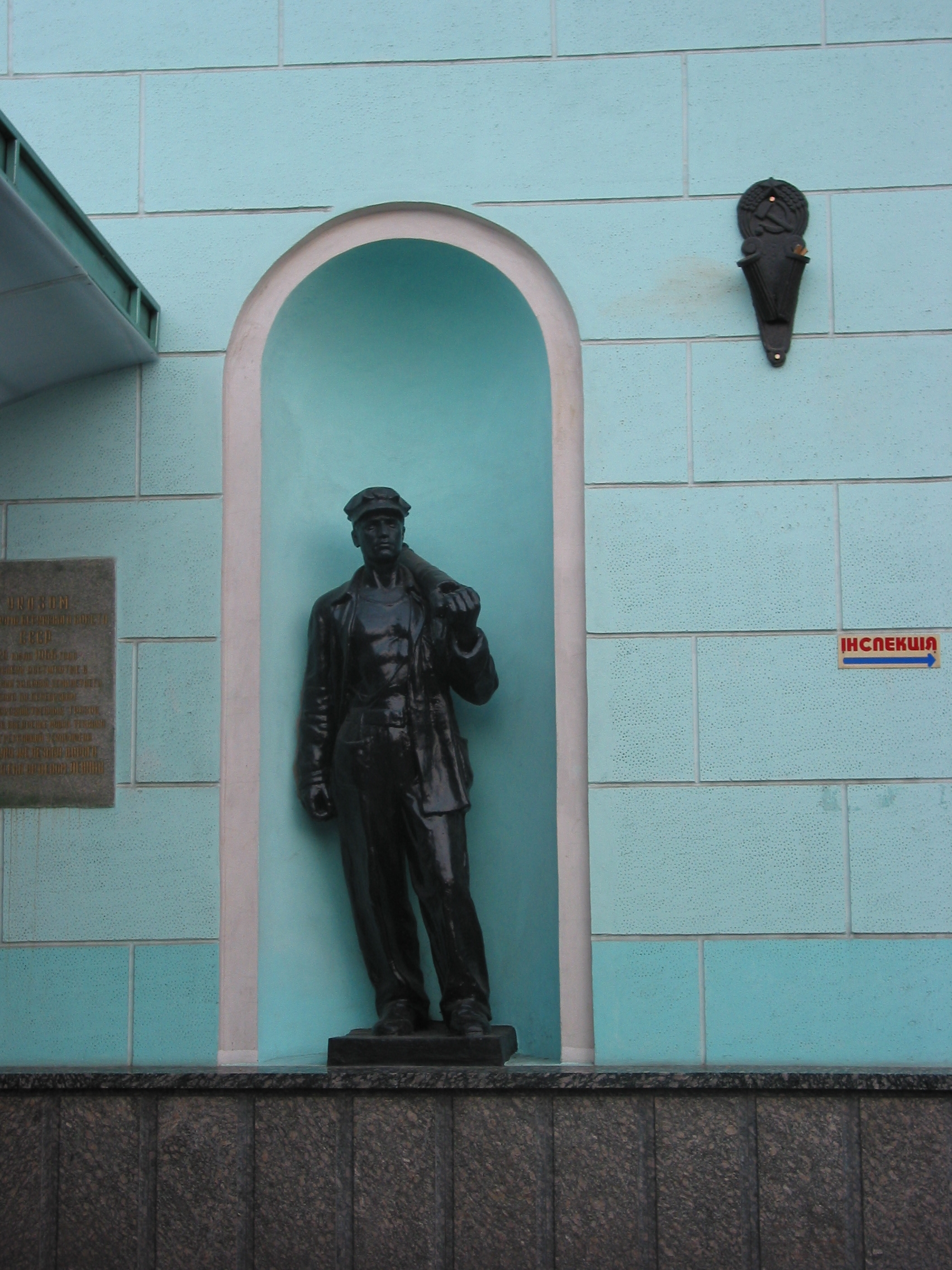

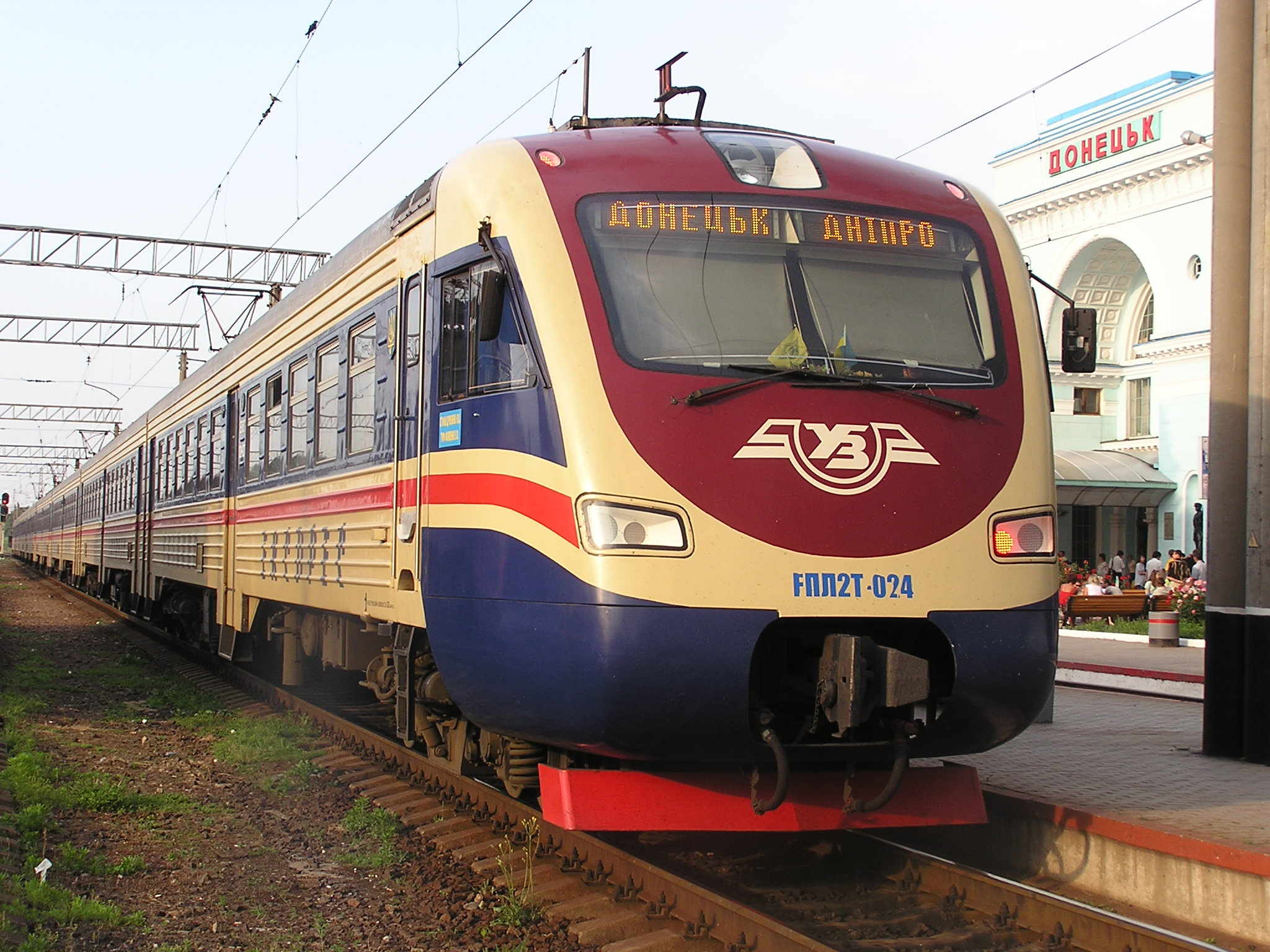
EPL2T multiple unit on the station

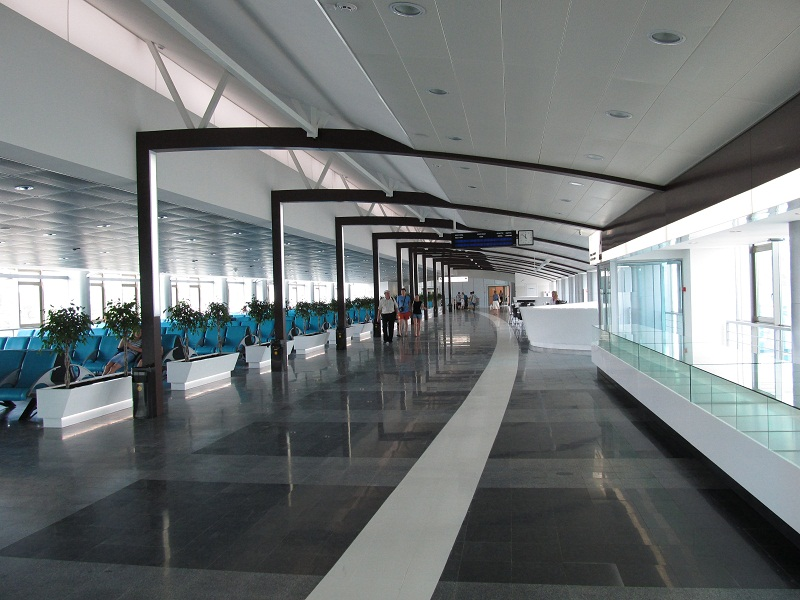
Passage from the station to the tracks, waiting hall
