= Mariupol railway station =

Main railway station in the Ukrainian city of Mariupol

Mariupol Маріуполь / Мариуполь
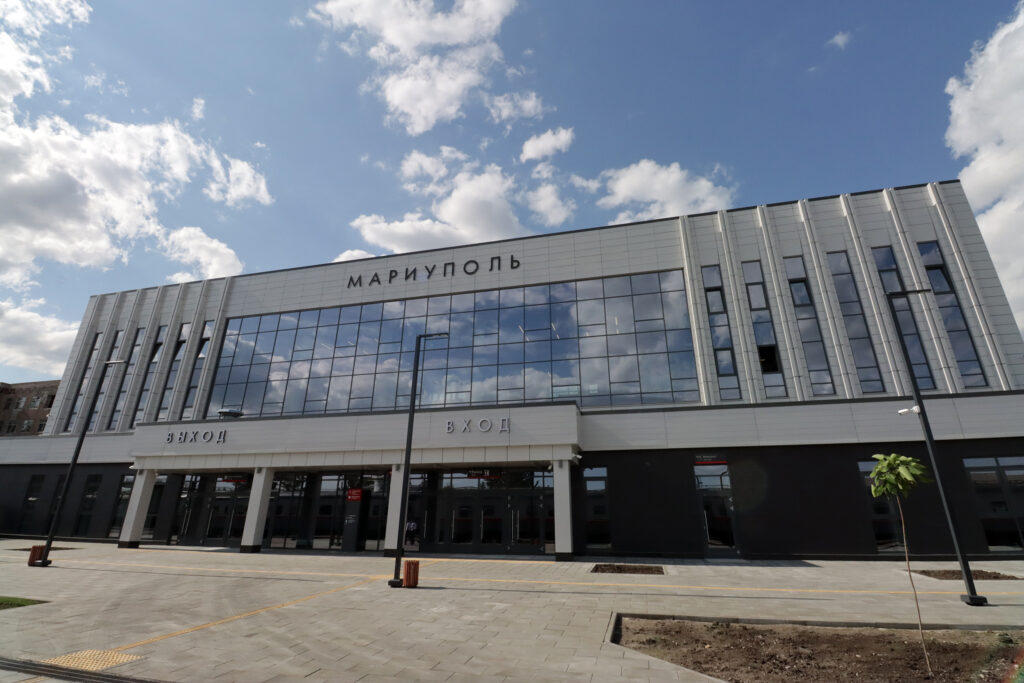
- Front view of the railway station in 2024

General information
- Location: Michman Pavlov Square, Mariupol
- Coordinates: 47°05′07″N 37°33′18″E
- Operator: De jure: Ukrainian Railways; De facto: Russian Railways; Railways of Novorossiya
- Distance: 945 kilometres (587 mi) from Kyiv-Pasazhyrskyi railway station
- Platforms: 3

Other information
- Station code: 89970

History
- Opened: 1882

Services
Preceding station	Ukrainian Railways	Following station
De jure part of Donets Railway, de facto operated by Railways of Novorossiya
Zavodska Rayazka toward Volnovakha	Volnovakha–Mariupol	Terminus
Suspended services (pre-2022)
Preceding station	Ukrainian Railways	Following station
Volnovakha toward Kyiv-Pasazhyrskyi	Pryazov'ya	Terminus
Volnovakha toward Kyiv-Pasazhyrskyi	70/69	Terminus
Volnovakha toward Kyiv-Pasazhyrskyi	78/77	Terminus
Volnovakha toward Kyiv-Pasazhyrskyi	Azov	Terminus
Volnovakha toward Odesa-Holovna	142/141	Terminus
pre-2014
Makiivka toward Kyiv-Pasazhyrskyi	78/77	Terminus
Terminus	384/383	Makiivka toward Vitebsk
Location

The Mariupol railway station (Ukrainian: Станція Маріуполь; Russian: Станция Мариуполь, romanized: Stantsiya Mariupol) is the main railway station in the Ukrainian city of Mariupol. It first opened in 1882, and is currently operated by Railways of Novorossiya.

== History ==
In the late 1800s, the industrialization in the Donbas created a need for more efficient transport between inland cities and ports on the Sea of Azov.

By 1882, the Mariupol station was completed to serve this purpose. Besides passenger lines, there was also a freight line towards the Port of Mariupol to improve transports of industrial goods.

During the German-Soviet War, the station was completely burned down. It was rebuilt in 1946.

In the 1970s, the station underwent renovations, and the waiting room now had decorations portraying famous people from Mariupol. In 1974 the construction was completed. A large mosaic in honor of the local metallurgical workers was installed in the station's main hall. In 2019 this mosaic was exhibited at the Headquarters of the United Nations in New York City.

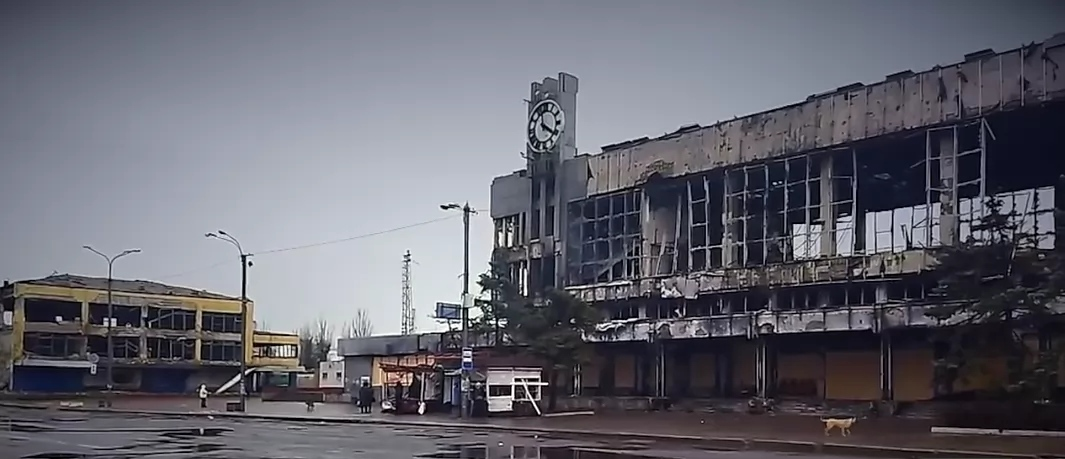
The station in 2022 following the Siege of Mariupol

In 2022, during the Russian invasion of Ukraine, much of the station was destroyed during the Siege of Mariupol. Following Russian victory, they began demolishing the remnants of the building. Mariupol and its surrounding Donetsk Oblast were unilaterally annexed by Russia in September 2022.

In July 2024, the station was reopened after a reconstruction. The above mentioned mosaic was, although not totally destroyed in 2022, removed and not returned to the station.
