= Novooleksiivka railway station =

Railway station in Novooleksiyivka, Ukraine

Coordinates: 46.2306°N 34.6503°E

Novooleksiivka Новоолексіївка
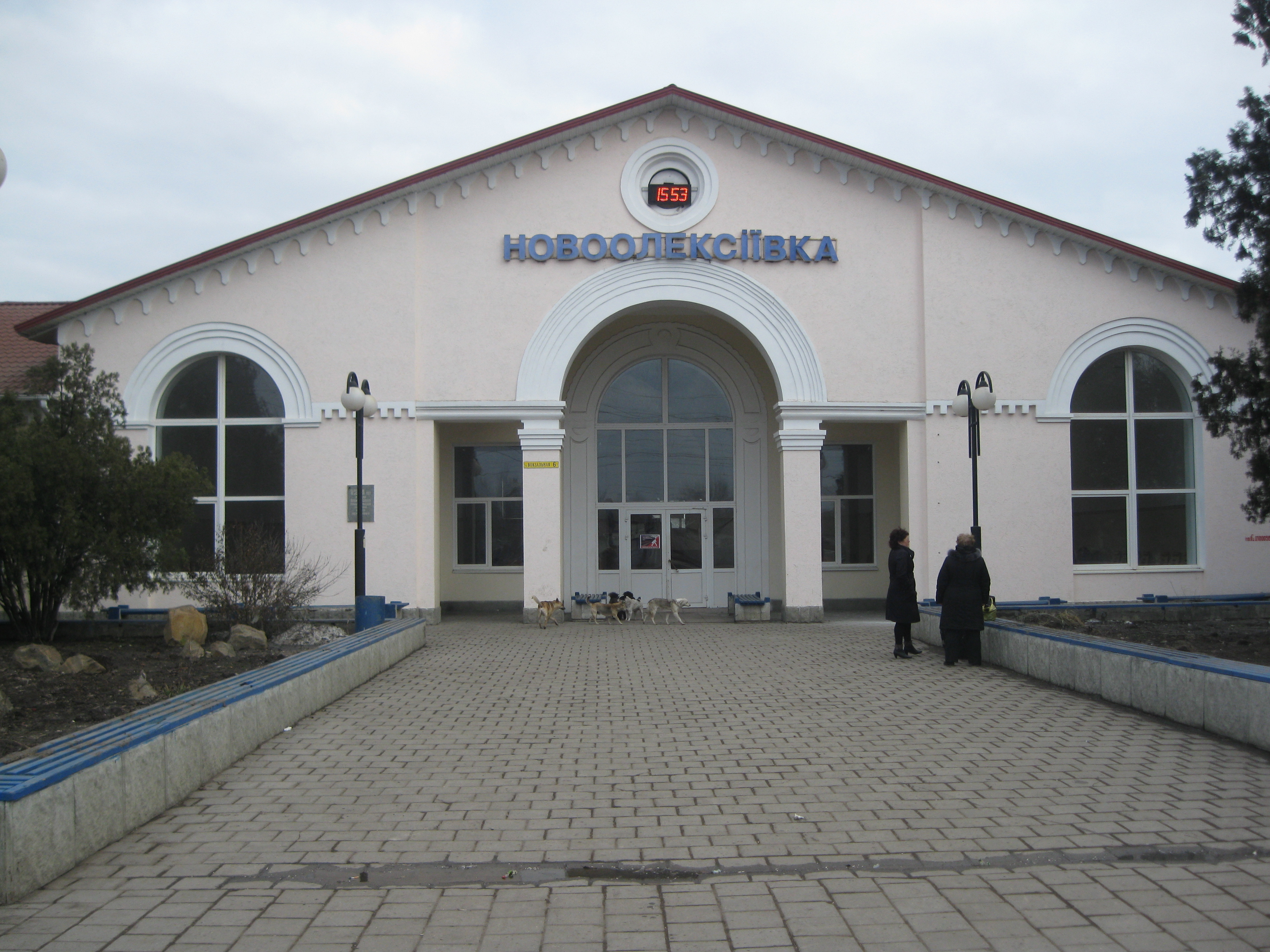
- View of the station from the street.

General information
- Location: Novooleksiivka; Ukraine
- System: Near-Dnipro Railway terminal
- Operator: De jure: Ukrainian Railways; De facto: Russian Railways; Novorossiya Railway
- Platforms: 4
- Tracks: 8

Construction
- Parking: yes

Other information
- Station code: 47540

History
- Opened: 1874

Services
Preceding station	Ukrainian Railways	Following station
De jure part of Prydnipro Railways, de facto operated by Novorossiya Railway
1305 km toward Fedorivka	Fedorivka–Novooleksiivka	Terminus
Terminus	Novooleksiivka–Dzhankoi	Salkove toward Syvash
Location

Novooleksiivka railway station (Ukrainian: Новоолексіївка) is a major junction railway station in Novooleksiivka, Ukraine. It is currently operated by Novorossiya Railway.

== History ==
The station was opened on 14 October 1874 as part of the Melitopol–Dzhankoi line.

In 2014, the line to Crimea was closed due to the Russian occupation of Crimea. Consequently, all lines that previously were linked to Crimea now end at this station.

On 24 February 2022, the first day of the Russian invasion of Ukraine, Russian troops from occupied Crimea crossed the border and seized control of Novooleksiivka. On 8 March 2022, an armored Russian train was recorded by locals using the lines near the station. The train was widely believed to be the Baikal, which had previously participated in Russian military drills in Crimea in 2016.

On 11 July 2023, Ukrinform published a report from a Telegram channel describing an explosion at a Russian ammunition depot, a building that was previously the station's coal warehouse. The report outlined how the shells inside exploded over the course of roughly three hours. It was later revealed that the explosion was caused by a Ukrainian drone attack.

== Trains ==
- Kyiv – Novooleksiivka
- Kharkiv – Novooleksiivka
- Lviv – Novooleksiivka
- Ivano-Frankivsk – Henichesk
- Dnipro, Kryvyi Rih – Henichesk
- Khmelnytskyi – Henichesk
- Kovel – Novooleksiivka
- Minsk – Novooleksiivka
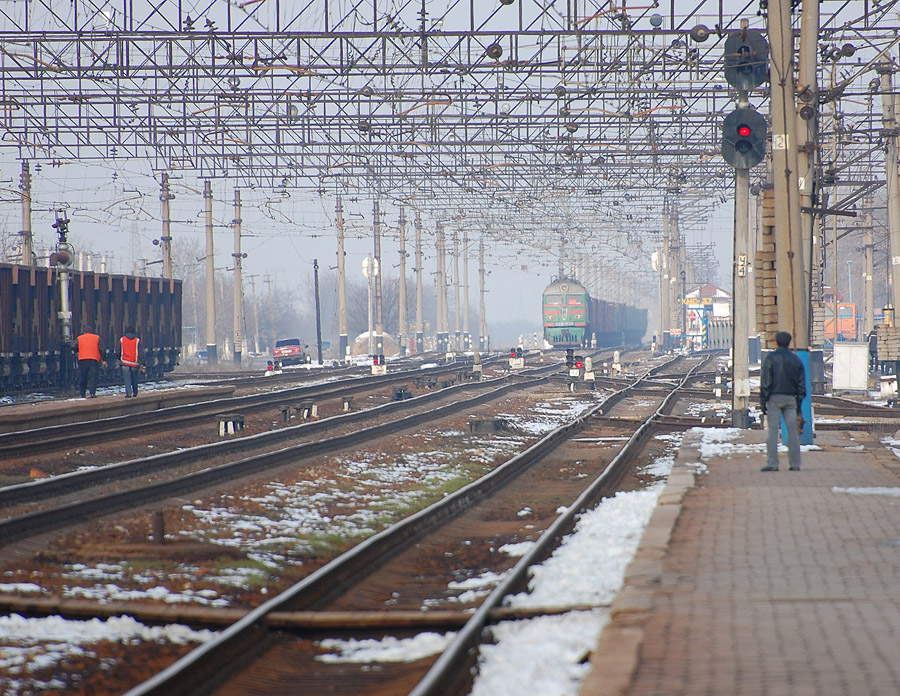
One of the platforms
