= Dilo Doxan =

Syrian Kurdish musician

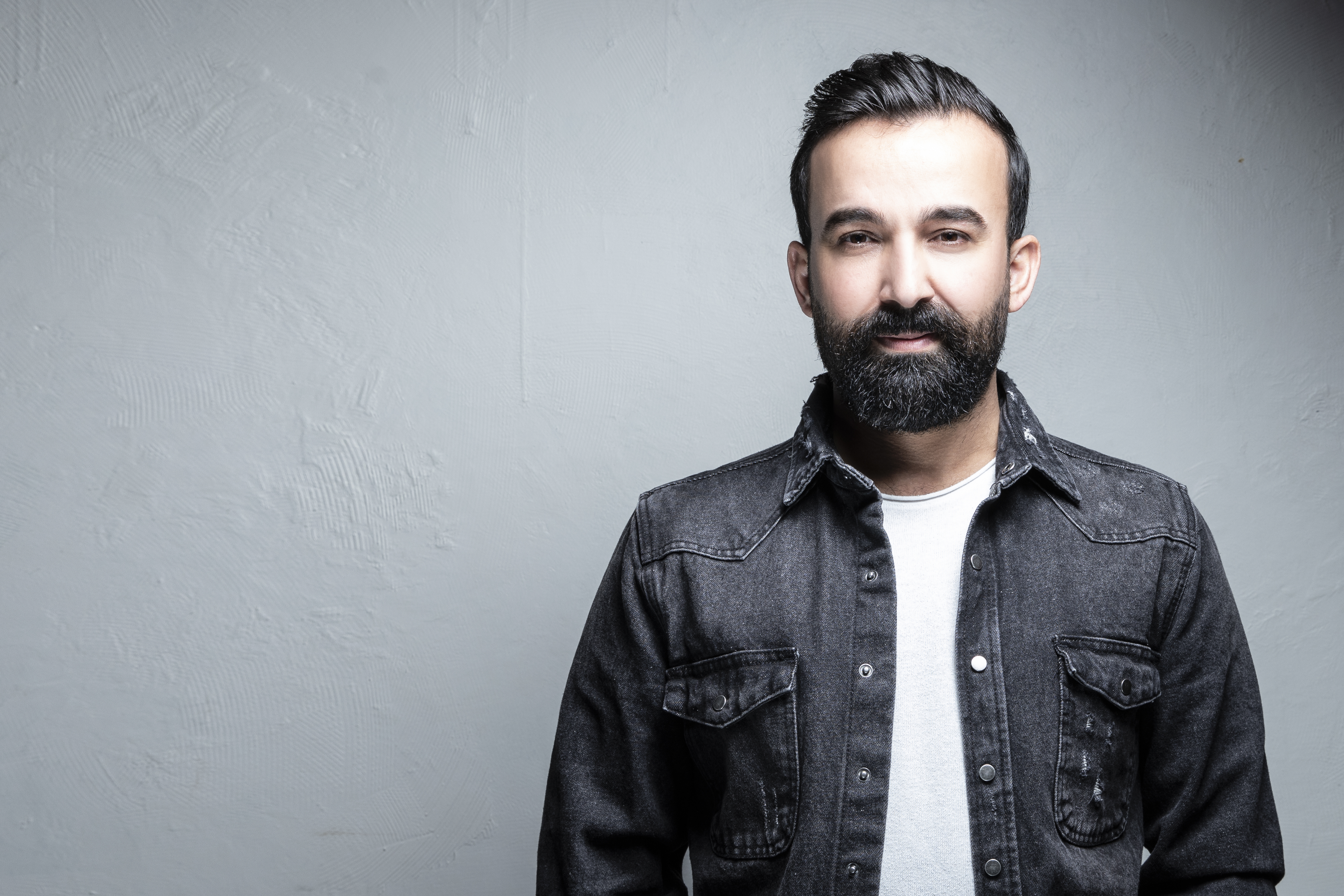
- Born: Dilovan Doghan; 1 January 1984 (age 41); Tirbesipiyê
- Occupation: Singer

Dilo Doxan (born 1 January 1984) is a Kurdish musician from Syria.

Doxan was born in the neighbourhood of Tirbesipiyê in the city of Qamisli and completed his education there. Since Doxan grew up in a Kurdish musician family and was raised with traditional Kurdish music, he also decided to become a musician. At the beginning of the 1990s he started his career with percussion instruments. After learning keyboard and Saz, he started singing. In early 1995, he participated in a music festival for young musicians from Syria and won the first prize. In 2004 he released his first album entitled "Rebene". He then gave several concerts and worked on his second album, which he released in 2008 under the title "Dildaro".

In March 2009 he fled to Germany for political reasons. Doxan returned to the studio in 2013 and released the album "Hestên dûriyê" after one year of work in 2014.

After producing three albums, Doxan worked with various composers such as Ronî Doxan and Elendê Ûsiv, who had composed one of his most famous songs "Bo çi" for him, and published them on the market.

Doxan currently lives in Hanover and performs at concerts all over Europe and is one of the most famous Kurdish singers from Syria.

== Discography ==
=== Albums ===
- Rebene (2004)
- Dildaro (2008)
- Hestên dûriyê (2014)

=== Singles ===
Song title	Year	Notes
"Bo çi"	2015	Composed by Elendê Ûsiv
"Wî kenî "	2019	
"Dilê min sot"	2021	
"Ji Te Hez Dikim"	2022	
"Dê Were"	2022	
"Gula Bi Tenê"	2024	Popular single
"Newroz"	2025	Collaboration with Nishan Doxan
"Çavê te reşin"	—	Popular single
"Dildaro"	—	From album, released as single
"Dilî Dilî"	—	Popular single
