= Novooleksiivka =

Rural locality in Kherson Oblast, Ukraine

Novooleksiivka Новоолексіївка
- Rural settlement
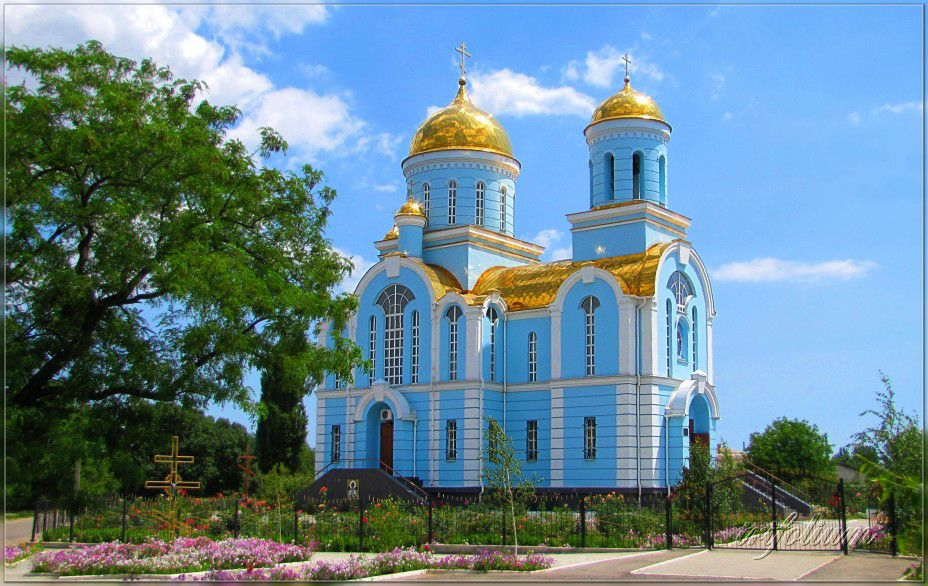
- Church of the Intercession of the Theotokos

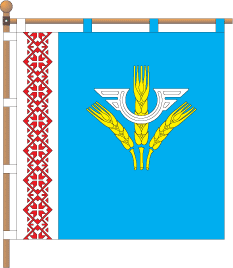
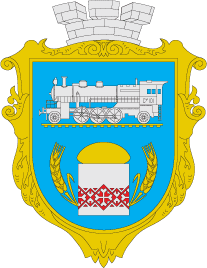
- Flag Coat of arms

- Location within Ukraine Location within Kherson Oblast
- Coordinates: 46°13′34″N 34°38′30″E
- Country: Ukraine
- Oblast: Kherson Oblast
- Raion: Henichesk Raion
- Hromada: Henichesk urban hromada
- Founded: 1874
- Elevation: 22 m (72 ft)

Population (2022)
  - Total: ▼10,026
- Time zone: UTC+2 (EET)
  - Summer (DST): UTC+3 (EEST)
- Postal code: 75560
- Area code: +380 5534

Novooleksiivka (Ukrainian: Новоолексіївка) is a rural settlement in Henichesk urban hromada, Henichesk Raion, Kherson Oblast, Ukraine. It had a population of 10,026 (2022 estimate).

== History ==
In 1874 under the Russian Empire, the Novooleksiivka railway station was founded as a small station near the village of Oleksiivka. A new settlement gradually developed around the station, becoming Novooleksiivka. As the freight turnover of the station was small, the population of Novooleksiivka was mainly engaged in agriculture. It was a part of the Dniprovsky district of the Tavriya Governorate at that time.

In 1908, the first school was built at Novooleksiivka at the expense of local peasants, where 2 teachers were employed and 64 pupils were engaged.

During the Ukrainian War of Independence, from 1917 to 1920, it passed between various factions. Afterwards it was administratively part of the Zaporizhzhia Governorate of Ukraine.

In 1930, a fruit-producing sovkhoz (state-owned farm) was built, whose main activity was the production, harvesting, storage, processing and sale of seeds.

Novooleksiivka was designated an urban-type settlement until 26 January 2024, when a new law entered into force which abolished this status, and Novooleksiivka became a rural settlement.

Novooleksiivka was captured by Russian ground forces on the first day of the Russian invasion in 2022, during the Russo-Ukrainian War, after they crossed the nearby border from Russian-occupied Crimea into mainland Ukraine.

== Demographics ==
According to the Ukrainian national census in 2001, Novooleksiivka had a population of 10,227 inhabitants. In contrast to other rural settlements in Ukraine, the population did not decline much in the following 20 years, and still counted 10,027 inhabitants in January 2022.

== Culture and community ==
Residents speak various languages. The largest group are native Ukrainian-speakers, accounting for roughly 40% of the population. 30% speak Russian as their primary language, 5% Crimean Tatar, and smaller minorities speak German, Belarusian and Romanian. Over one fifth of the population claimed to speak another language natively, or did not state any native tongue. The exact composition was as follows.

Native languages in Novooleksiivka
| | percent |
| Ukrainian | 40.7% |
| Russian | 31.5% |
| Crimean Tatar | 5.5% |
| Belarusian | 0.3% |
| German | 0.2% |
| Moldovan | 0.1% |
| Romani | 0.1% |
| others | 21.2% |

School No. 1 teaches Crimean Tatar language and literature as an elective subject in all grades, and is the only school in mainland Ukraine (outside Crimea) where they are taught. About 63% of the pupils at the school were of Crimean Tatar descent, as of 2016.

Religious buildings include the Intercession of the Theotokos (or Protection of Our Most Holy Lady) Orthodox church, and the Adzhy Belial Dzhami mosque.

== See also ==
- Russian occupation of Kherson Oblast
