= Life in a Day =

Life in a Day may refer to:

- Life in a Day (album), a 1979 song and album by Simple Minds
- "Life in a Day" (song), a 2003 single by I Am Kloot
- Life in a Day (1999 film), a science-fiction film
- Life in a Day (2011 film), a documentary film
- Life in a Day (2020 film), a documentary film
