= Donets Railway =

State-owned railway company in Ukraine

Donets Railway Донецька залізниця
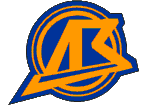

- Map of the system (in Russian)

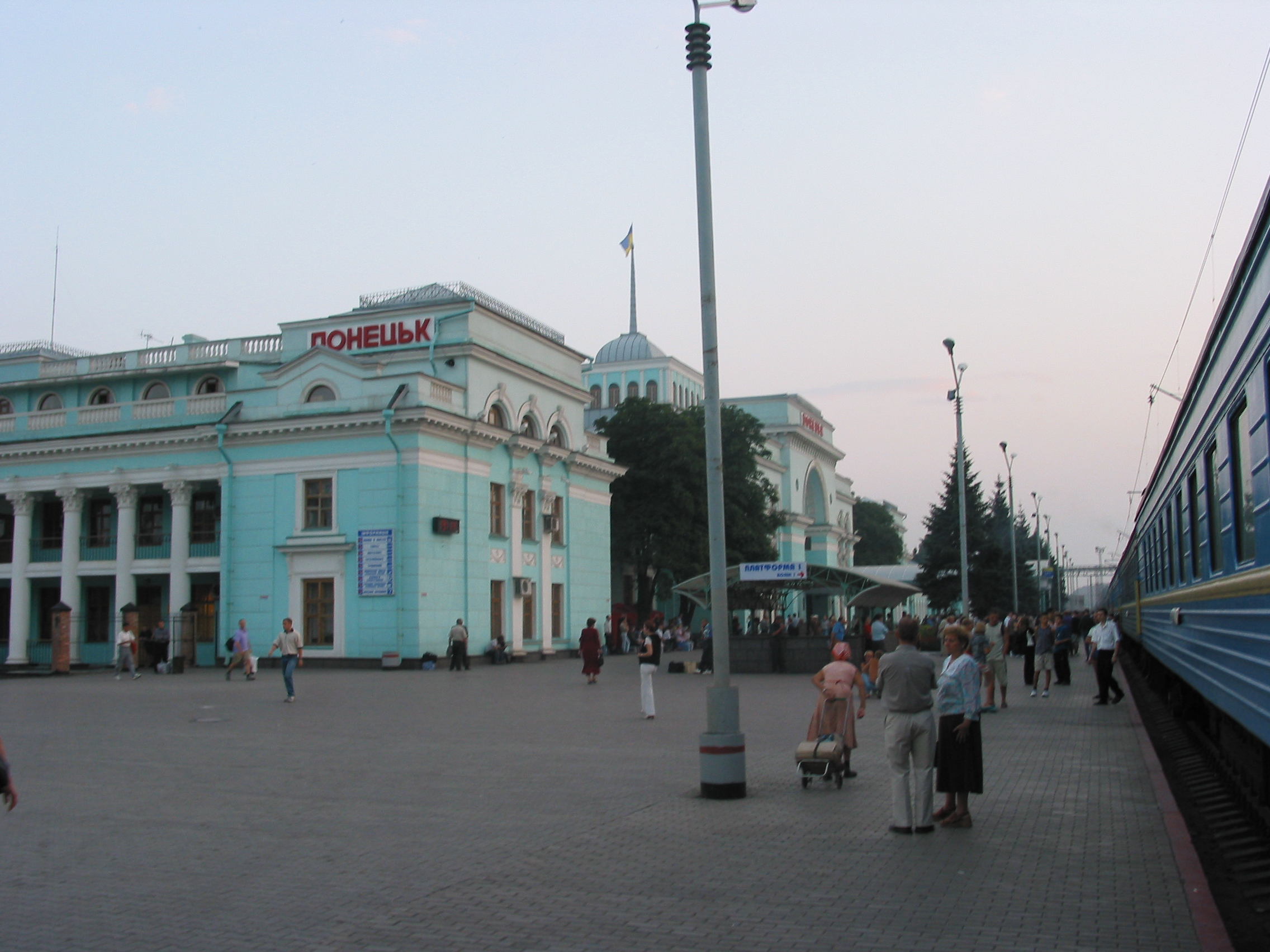
- Donetsk railway station

Overview
- Headquarters: Lyman since 2014; previously Donetsk
- Locale: Ukraine
- Dates of operation: 15 May 1953–
- Predecessor: North Donets Railways; South Donets Railways

Technical
- Track gauge: 1,520 mm (4 ft 11 27/32 in)
- Length: 3,275 km (2,030 mi)

Other
- Website: Official website

The Donets Railway (Ukrainian: Донецька залізниця, romanized: Donetska zaliznytsia) is a railway in Donbas, Eastern Ukraine. It is one of six rail systems owned and operated by Ukrainian Railways. It is part-owned by the Ukrainian government; Russia has claimed it since the 2014 Russian military intervention in Ukraine. Because of that, only part of the Donetsk Railway is operational. In December 2014, a regional branch of Ukrzaliznytsia Donetsk Railway was created and the headquarters was moved from Donetsk to Lyman.

== History ==
The railway was formed in 1953 by merging the Bakhmut Northern Railway and the Yasynuvata Southern Railway.

== Today ==
The railway serves Ukraine's largest industrial heartland of Donbas–Donetsk and Luhansk, and parts of Zaporizhzhia, Kharkiv and Dnipropetrovsk oblasts, thus combining in a single transport corridor the cities of Donbas and Dnipro, the central regions of Ukraine. It is connected to the Russian regions of Volga and the Caucasus. The railway has two border transfer stations on the Russia–Ukraine border, over which it does not have control due to war conditions. Those are Krasna Mohyla station (Chervonopartyzansk), Kvashyne, Ilovaisk, and Lantrativka, Troitske Raion. At its southern extreme, Donetsk Railways reaches Mariupol – the largest industrial center of Ukraine – and has access to the Sea of Azov through Mariupol's commercial port.

The railway comprises 13% of all track kilometres in Ukraine, but accounts for 47% of all traffic and 36% of the revenue of Ukrainian Railways. Its network covers around 57,000 square kilometres (22,000 square miles).

The railway is a key route, serving passengers and several industries, including coal mines, metallurgical, coke-chemical and pipe mills, engineering and machine-building plants, chemical, light, and food.

In December 2014, the Ukrainian government claimed ownership of the Donetsk Railway and the land its serves. All its affiliated companies under the control of the Ukrainian government were transferred to the temporary administration of either Southern Ukrainian Railways or Cisdnieper Railways.

== Structure ==
The Donetsk Railway administrative division consists of three railway transportation directorates all located in Lyman:

- Krasno-Lyman
- Luhansk
- Donetsk

Previously, two other directorates also existed:

- Ilovaisk
- Zhdanov (Mariupol)
- Yasynuvata
- Debaltseve

The main railway hubs of Donetsk railway are:

- Yasynuvata
- Donetsk
- Mariupol (at Mariupol-Port)
- Debaltseve
- Ilovaisk
- Luhansk
- Popasna
- Kondrashevska-Nova
- Pokrovsk
- Kramatorsk
- Sloviansk
- Kostiantynivka
- Mykytivka
- Lyman
- Chervona Mohyla
- Volnovakha

== Russo-Ukrainian War ==
Because of the Russian occupation of Ukraine, authority over certain railways and stations was granted to Cisdnieper Railways and Ukrainian Southern Railways. Currently, southern branches are under Cisdnieper Railways' administration, while the northern branches are still operated by the Krasny-Lyman Directorate. In 2016, trains recommenced operation on a separate branch in Luhansk, which had become separated due to the conflict.

On 28 May 2016, rail employees of the Donetsk People's Republic in Yasynuvata demonstrated against not being paid by the Government of Ukraine. On 28 July 2016, it was admitted that the protests were legitimate and the government owed the workers back pay. This involved a process of restructuring, an issue that the Ukrainian government is still trying to resolve. A spokesperson stated that all personnel are still considered by the Government of Ukraine to be employees of Ukrzaliznytsia (UZ) and has not recognised any other employer.
