= Prydnipro Railways =

State-owned railway company in Ukraine

Prydniprovska Railways (PZ) Придніпровська залiзниця
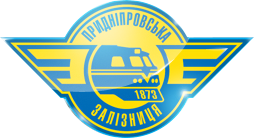

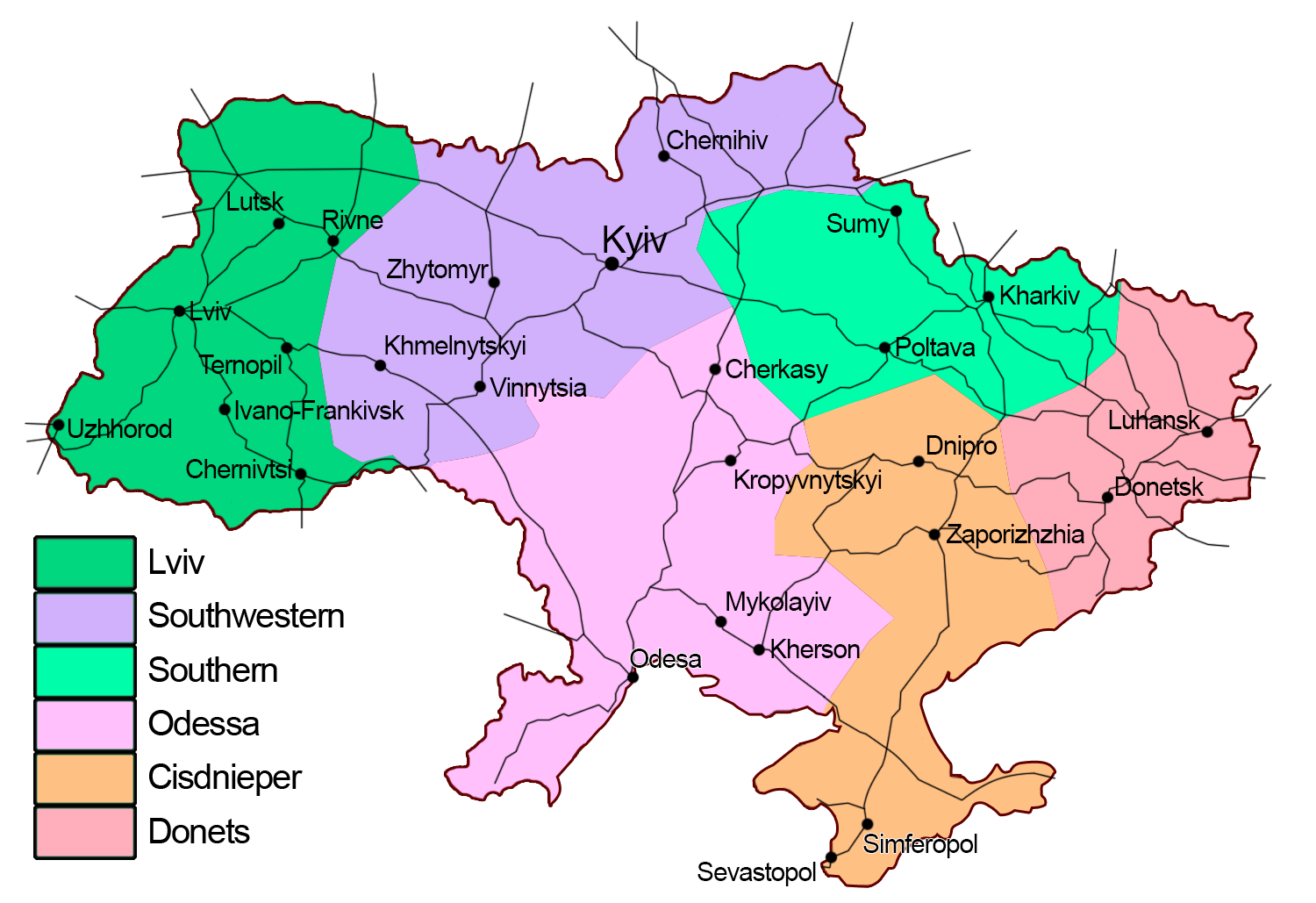
- Subdivisions of Ukrainian Railways

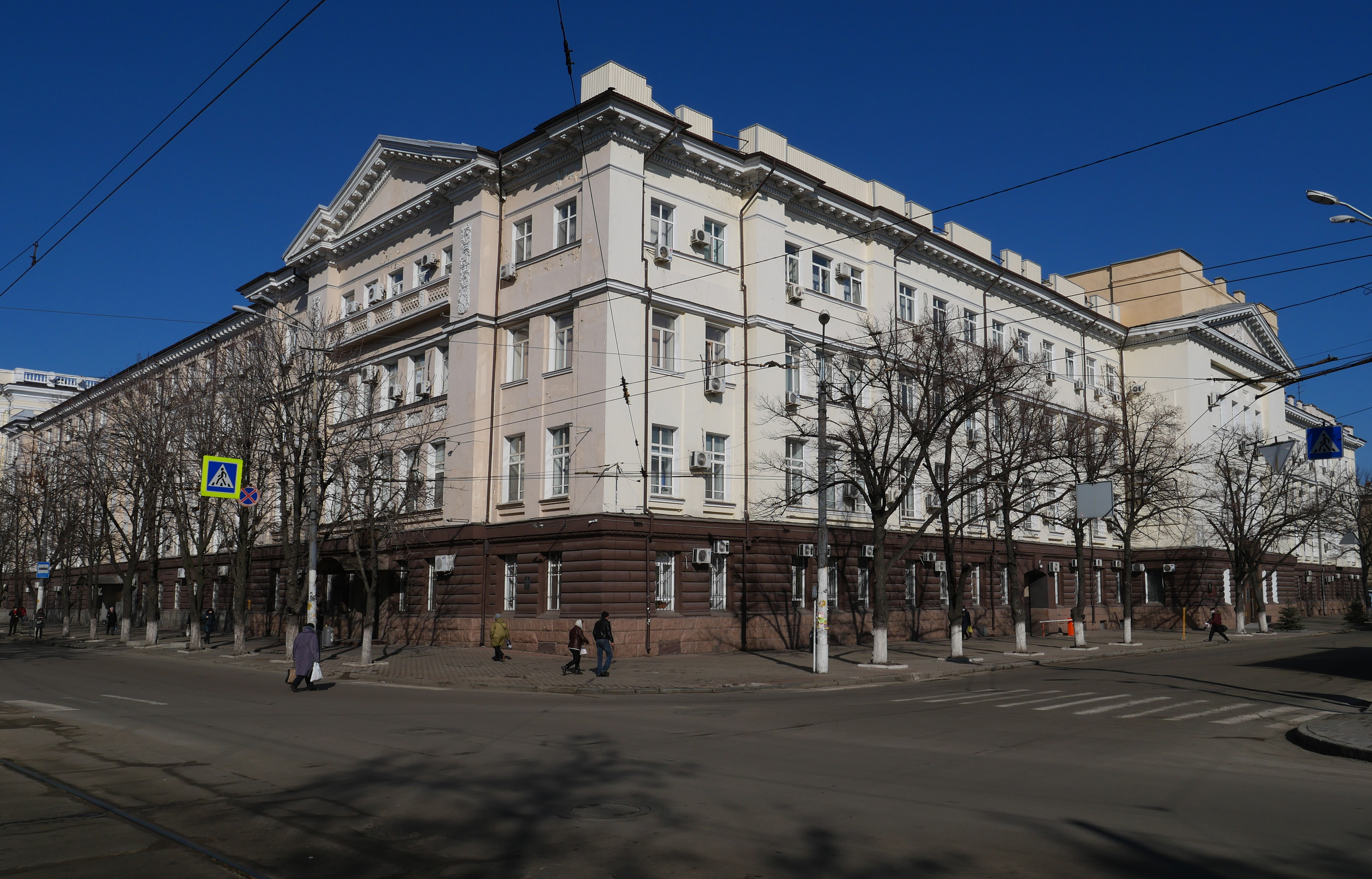
- Railway headquarters in Dnipro

Overview
- Headquarters: Dnipro
- Locale: Central, Eastern, Southern Ukraine
- Dates of operation: 1873–present
- Predecessor: Prydnieper Railway (Soviet Union)

Technical
- Track gauge: 1,520 mm (4 ft 11 27/32 in)
- Length: 3,275 km (2,030 mi)

Other
- Website: http://www.dp.uz.gov.ua/

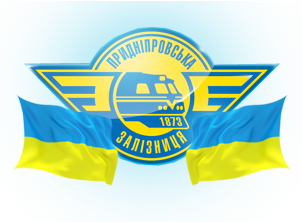
Logo with flags

Prydnipro Railway or Cisdnieper Railway (Ukrainian: Придніпровська залiзниця (ПЗ), romanized: Prydniprovska zaliznytsia (PZ), lit. 'Near-Dnipro railway') is a regional operator of Ukrainian Railways in the south of Ukraine with headquarters in Dnipro city.

The PZ consists of three divisions – Dnipro Railway, Zaporizhzhia Railway, Kryvyi Rih Railway. PZ's route map includes all the railroads in the Dnipropetrovsk and Zaporizhzhia oblasts (provinces), also a large part of former Kryvyi Rih metropolitan area and some part in Kharkiv oblast. Access to railroads in the Autonomous Republic of Crimea has been suspended since 2014 due to annexation of Crimea by the Russian Federation.

As of 2008, PZ's rail system included 3,275 km (2,035 mi) of track, of which 93.3% was electrified. There are 244 railway stations.

== History ==
The idea of building a railway network passing through Dnipro city is credited to the first Russian minister of railways Pavel Petrovich Melnikov who in 1862 expressed an interest in connecting the Kryvyi Rih Iron Ore Basin (Kryvbas) with the Donets Coal Basin (Donbas).

The railway was commissioned in 1884 with its headquarters was located in Kryvyi Rih, before being relocated to Dnipro (Yekaterinoslav) and renamed to Catherine Railroad (Екатерининская). In the 1890s it expanded by adding existing neighboring railway companies i.e. Donets–Black-coal Railways and parts of Kursk–Kharkiv–Azov Railways.

Under the government of Ukrainian State in 1918, Communications Minister Borys Butenko issued a decree, according to which Southern Railways were to be renamed into Zaporizhzhia Railways. In 1936–1961 the railway bore the name Stalin Railways.

== Main information ==
The area served by Prydnipro Railways is mostly in Southern Ukraine. The operational length of the railroad was 3,255 km in 1990. The railway connects the Donets Coal Basin (Donbas) and the Kryvyi Rih Iron Ore Basin (Kryvbas) with two latitudinal lines Chaplyne — Synelnykove to Dnipro — Verkhivtseve — Piatykhatky and Kamysh-Zorya — Canopies — Zaporizhzhia — Apostolove — Krivyi Rih — Dymkove. The railroad serves the major industrial centers: Zaporizhzhia, Dnipro, Krivyi Rih, Pavlohrad, Nikopol, Novomoskovsk and others, and also agricultural areas.

Prydnipro railway is characterized by a high share freight. In 1990, the turnover of the road amounted to approximately 88,000,000,000 t-km. The freight transported is dominated by iron and manganese ores, coal, coke, ferrous metals, industrial goods, machinery, equipment, building materials, fluxes, grain. Tight supply transportation 27,000,000 t-km/km Intensive passenger traffic exists from Moscow, Donetsk, Odesa, South-West, North Caucasus, October, Lviv Railways. The passenger turnover was (1990) 12,000,000,000 passenger-km. Prydnipro railways is a well-developed suburban passenger traffic system (over 85% of all passengers), but because of the small range, the proportion of commuter traffic is about 25%.

During World War II, the railroad was badly damaged. During the battles and the liberation of the territory from invaders, railroad workers carried out the supply to frontlines, the transport service, the restoration path and rolling stock. Thousands of railway workers participated in combat operations, worked in the underground.

In the postwar years in the Prydnieper railway Trade Union was not only restored, but also constructed, reconstructed, new stations, railway stations, artificial structures, including major bridges across the Dnieper. The main meridional direction Lozova–Zaporozhia transferred to electric traction; electrified main latitudinal direction and suburban areas. Electric traction is 77% of the total turnover, the rest is diesel. Up to 85% of the road sections equipped with automatic lock, up to 95% – electric interlocking of switches and signals. Built large marshaling yards, equipped with modern technical means of mechanization and automation. On loading and unloading operations are applied mechanization. High-performance track machines are used for current maintenance and repairs.
