= Imeni Vasylia Nesvita railway station =

Railway station in Sumy Oblast, Ukraine

Imeni Vasylia Nesvita Ім. Василя Несвіта

General information
- Coordinates: 50°43′34″N 34°51′53″E
- System: Southern Railways station
- Owner: Ukrzaliznytsia
- Lines: Basy–Boromlya; Imeni Vasylia Nesvita–Nyzy
- Platforms: 2
- Tracks: 4

Other information
- Station code: 445645

History
- Opened: 1913

Services
Preceding station	Ukrzaliznytsia	Following station
Nyzy	Southern Railways	Boromlia
Syrovatka	Southern Railways	Boromlia
Location

Imeni Vasylia Nesvita (Ukrainian: Імені Василя Несвіта, named after Vasyl Nesvit), until 2012 Hrebinnykivka, is a railway transfer station near Verkhnia Syrovatka, Sumy Oblast, Ukraine. The station is at a junction of the Imeni Vasylia Nesvita-Nyzy and Basy-Boromlia lines of the Sumy Directorate of Southern Railways, and is primarily used for transfers from the main line to the Nyzy branch. The distance to Nyzy is 11 km (6.8 mi).

The station is located between Syrovatka (16 kilometres (10 mi) away) and Boromlia (11 km (7 mi) away) stations.

== History ==
The station was opened on December 22, 1913, under the name Hrebinnykivka.

On October 8, 2012, the station was renamed in honor of the former head of Southern Railways Vasyl Nesvit.

== Passenger service ==
On November 16, 2010, the movement of railcars was opened on the Hrebinnykivka (now Imeni Vasylia Nesvita) - Nyzy line. But despite the low fare of the rail bus, it was unused, and was soon canceled.

Passenger and suburban trains stop at the station.

Suburban trains go to the stations of Sumy, Bilopillia, Virynskyi Zavod, Kyrykivka, Liubotyn, Merchyk, and Trostianets-Smorodyne.

== Notes ==
- Tariff Guide No. 4. Book 1 (as of 05/15/2021) (Russian) Archived 05/15/2021.
