= Toropylivka railway station =

Railway station in Sumy, Ukraine

Toropylivka Торопилівка
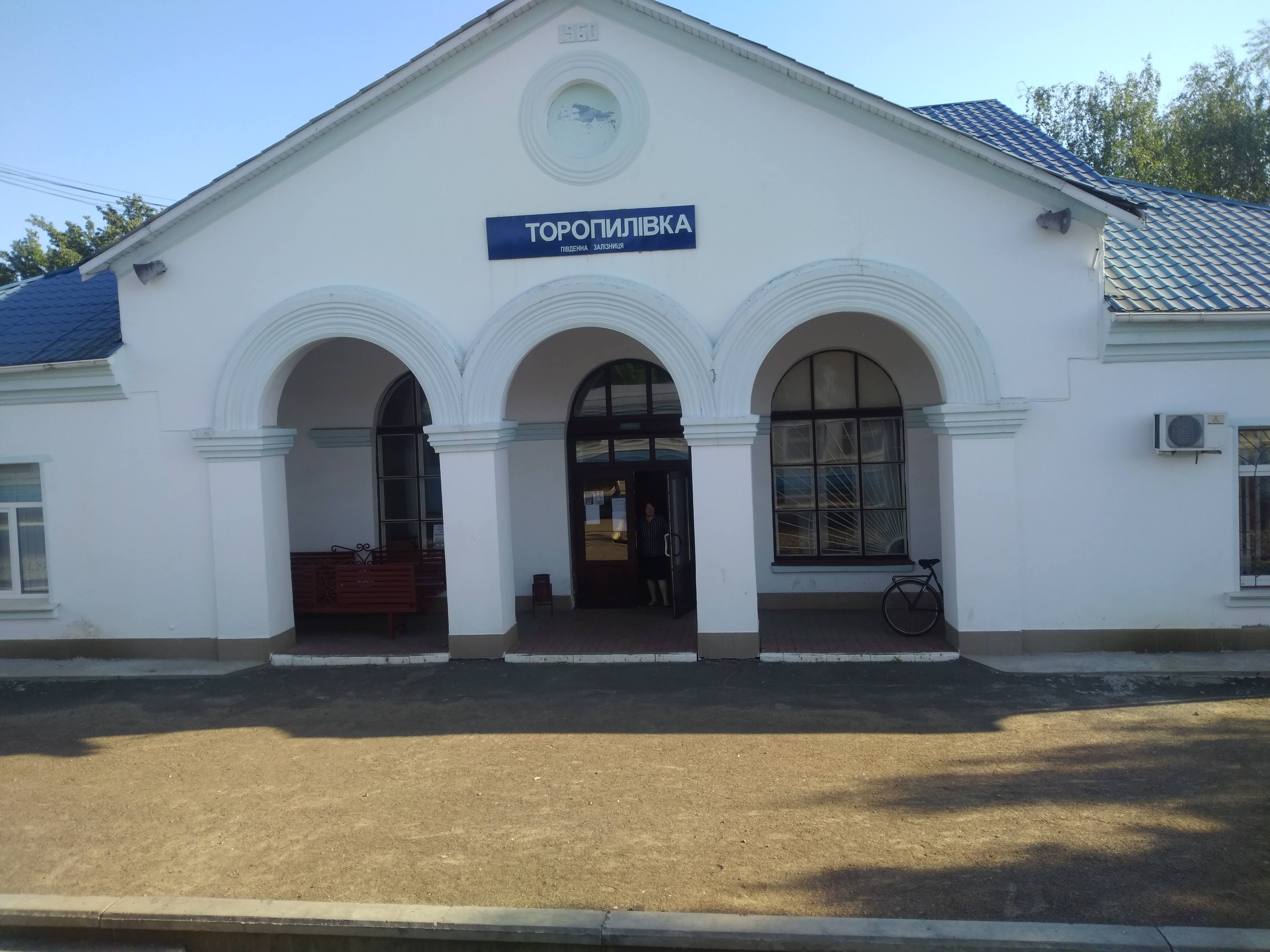

General information
- Coordinates: 50°56′33″N 34°40′14″E
- System: Southern Railways station
- Owner: Ukrzaliznytsia
- Line: Bilopillia–Basy
- Platforms: 2
- Tracks: 5

Other information
- Station code: 445202

History
- Opened: 1895
- Rebuilt: 1960, 2008

Services
Preceding station	Ukrzaliznytsia	Following station
Holovashivka	Southern Railways	Sumy
Location

Toropylivka (Ukrainian: Торопилівка) is a railway station in Stepanivka, Sumy Oblast, Ukraine. The station serves as a minor passenger station as well as a major freight yard for nearby businesses in Stepanivka. It is on the Sumy Branch of Southern Railways on the Bilopillia-Basy line.

Toropylivka is located between the stations of Sumy (10 kilometres (6 mi) away) and Holovashivka (8 km (5 mi) away).

== History ==
The station dates back to its opening in 1895. The reason for the discovery was the construction of a sugar factory in 1893, which needed a railway to supply raw materials. The station probably got its name from the village of Toropylivka, which was located seven kilometres (4 mi) away. (The village no longer exists.)

The first station house was built in 1906, but it has not survived to this day. The modern building was built in 1960, the current appearance of the station acquired after reconstruction in 2008.

== Passenger service ==
At Toropylivka stop only suburban trains in the directions of Vorozhba, Sumy, and Virynskyi Zavod.

== Notes ==
- Tariff Guide No. 4. Book 1 (as of 05/15/2021) (Russian) Archived 05/15/2021.
- Ukraine. Atlas of Railways. Mirilo 1: 750 000. - K .: DNVP "Cartography", 2008. - 80 p. - ISBN 978-966-475-082-7.
