= Ambary railway station =

Railway station in Sumy Oblast, Ukraine

Ambary Амбари
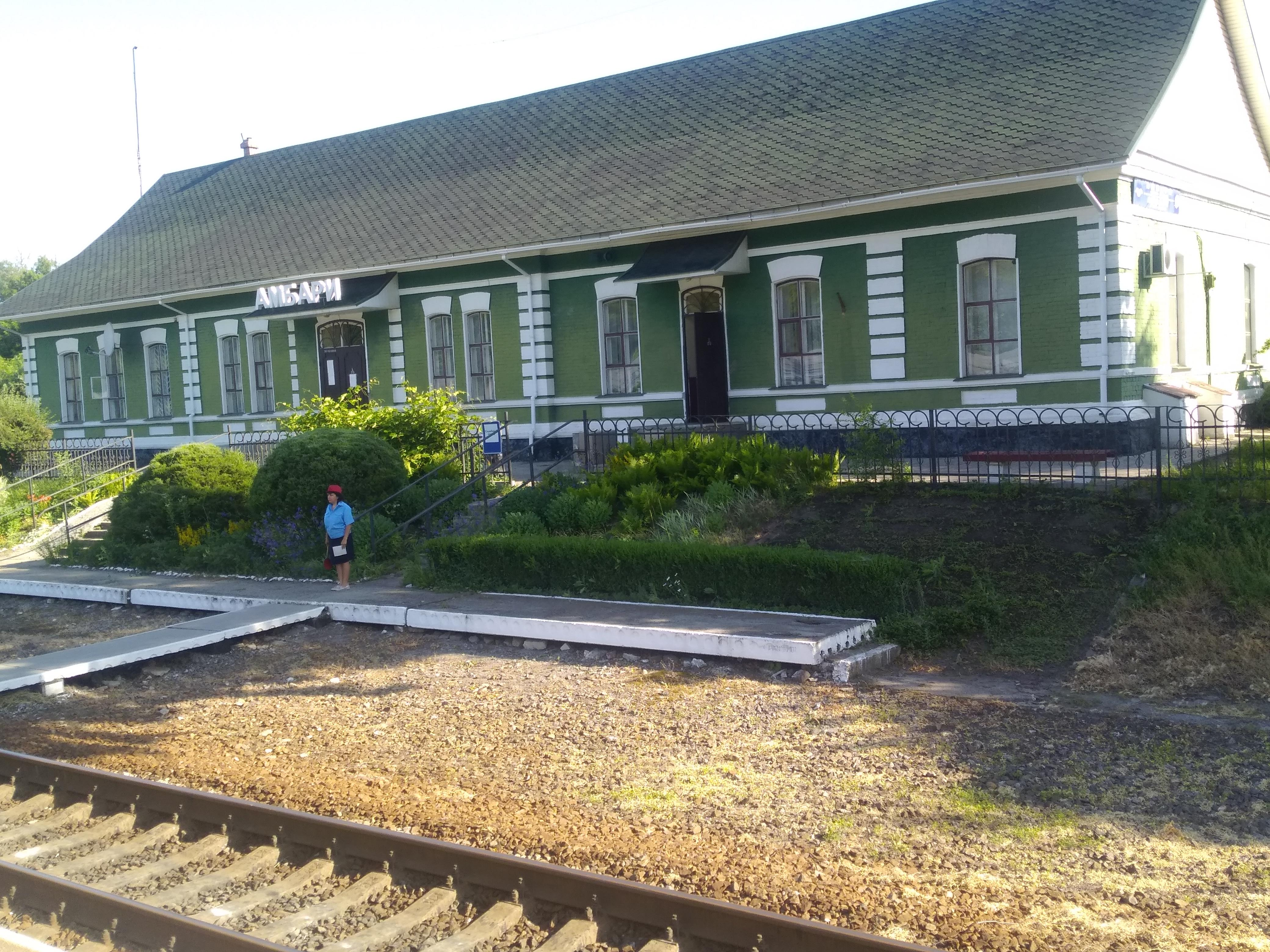

General information
- Coordinates: 51°00′06″N 34°27′51″E
- System: Southern Railways station
- Owner: Ukrzaliznytsia
- Line: Bilopillia–Basy
- Platforms: 2
- Tracks: 4

Other information
- Station code: 444910

History
- Opened: 1907
- Rebuilt: ≈ 2000

Services
Preceding station	Ukrzaliznytsia	Following station
Vyry	Southern Railways	Holovashivka
Virynskyi Zavod	Southern Railways	Holovashivka
Location

Ambary (Ukrainian: Амбари) is a railway station in Ambary, Sumy Oblast, Ukraine. The station is on the Sumy Directorate of Southern Railways on the Bilopillia-Basy line.

Ambary is located in between Vyry (8 kilometres (5 mi) away) and Holovashivka (8 km (5 mi) away) stations. The station is at a junction with the Ambary-Virynskyi Zavod branch, 12 km (7 mi) away from Virynskyi Zavod station.

== History ==
The station was opened in 1907 together with the construction of the section Vorozhba - Sumy - Kharkiv, when there was a need to connect the sugar factory in the village of Mykolaivka with the railway network. Four years later, in 1911, a short branch line was built to the Virynskyi Zavod station, since then the station has been a hub, with the help of the well-known sugar grower Pavlo Ivanovych Kharitonenko.

Many sources indicate that the station was built in 1964, but this is not true. During World War II, the station was not damaged at all, photos from the 1940s have been preserved, where it is possible to see almost the same station as today. In the early 2000s the building was reconstructed, the roof completely redesigned. The oldest building at the station is a unique wooden water tower. It is small and painted green like the station.

== Passenger service ==
Only suburban trains in the directions of Vorozhba, Sumy railway station, and Virynskyi Zavod stop here. Long-distance passenger trains do not stop at Ambary station.

== Notes ==
- Tariff Guide No. 4. Book 1 (as of 05/15/2021) (Russian) Archived 05/15/2021.
- Arkhangelsky A.S., Arkhangelsky V.A. in two books. - M.: Transport, 1981. (rus.)
