= Nyzy =

Rural locality in Sumy Oblast, Ukraine

Nyzy Низи
- Rural settlement
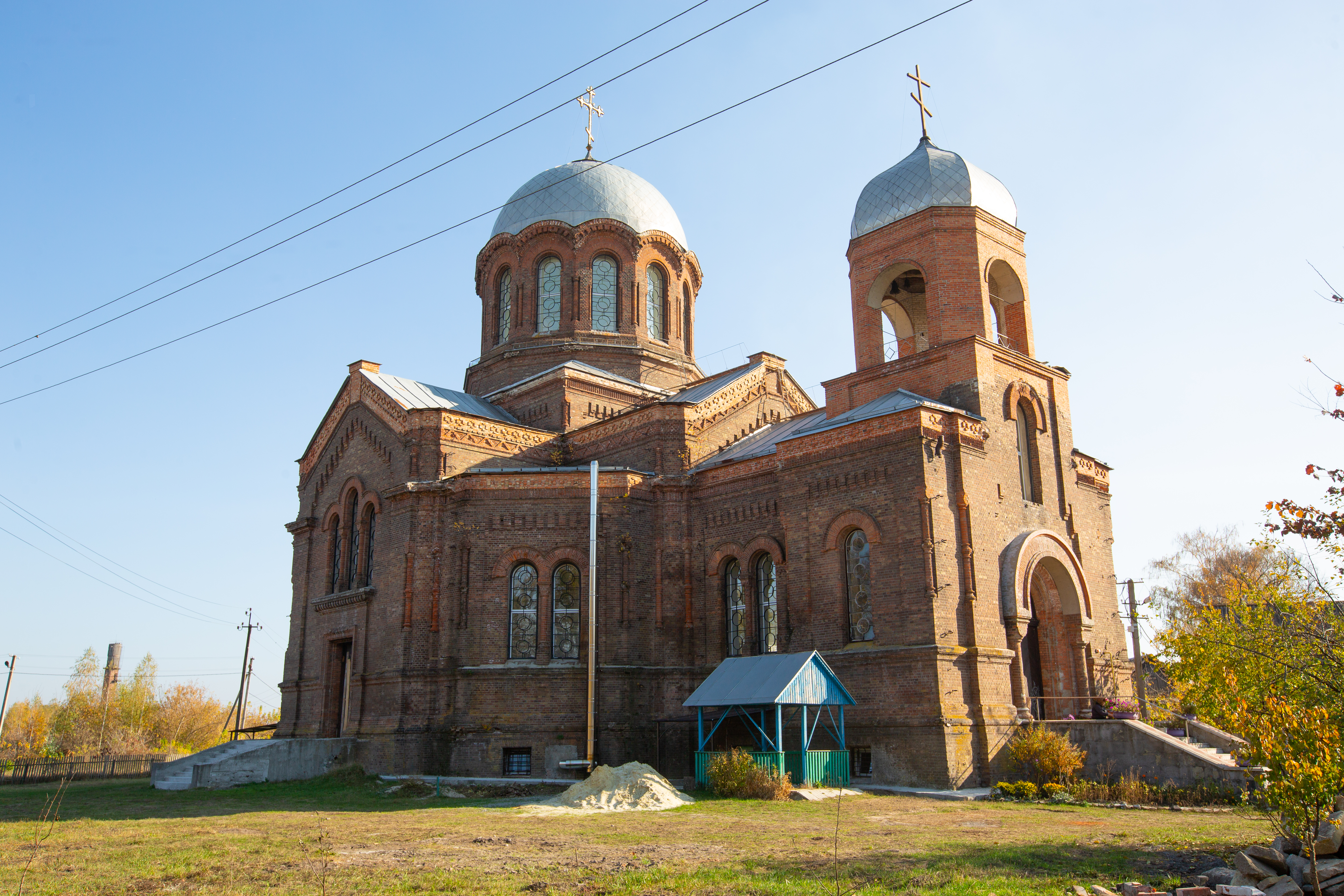
- Orthodox church in Nyzy

- Location in Sumy Oblast Location in Ukraine
- Country: Ukraine
- Oblast: Sumy Oblast
- Raion: Sumy Raion
- Hromada: Sad rural hromada

Population (2022)
  - Total: 2,699
  - Estimate (2026): 2,983
- Time zone: UTC+2 (EET)
  - Summer (DST): UTC+3 (EEST)

Nyzy (Ukrainian: Низи; Russian: Низы) is a rural settlement in Sumy Raion, Sumy Oblast, Ukraine. It is located on the left bank of the Psel, about 15 kilometres (9.3 mi) south of Sumy. Nyzy belongs to Sad rural hromada, one of the hromadas of Ukraine. Population: 2,699 (2022 estimate).

Until 26 January 2024, Nyzy was designated urban-type settlement. On this day, a new law entered into force which abolished this status, and Nyzy became a rural settlement.

== Economy ==
=== Transportation ===
Nyzy railway station is a terminus of the railway line from Boromlia, however, it does not have much passenger traffic. The closest station with more passenger traffic is Imeni Vasylia Nesvita, near Nyzhnia Syrovatka, 3 kilometres (1.9 mi) east of the settlement, on the railway connecting Vorozhba and Kharkiv via Sumy.

The settlement has access to Highway H07 which runs north to Sumy and west to Romny, and Kyiv.
