= Trolleybuses in Sumy =

Trolleybus system in Ukraine

Sumy trolleybus system

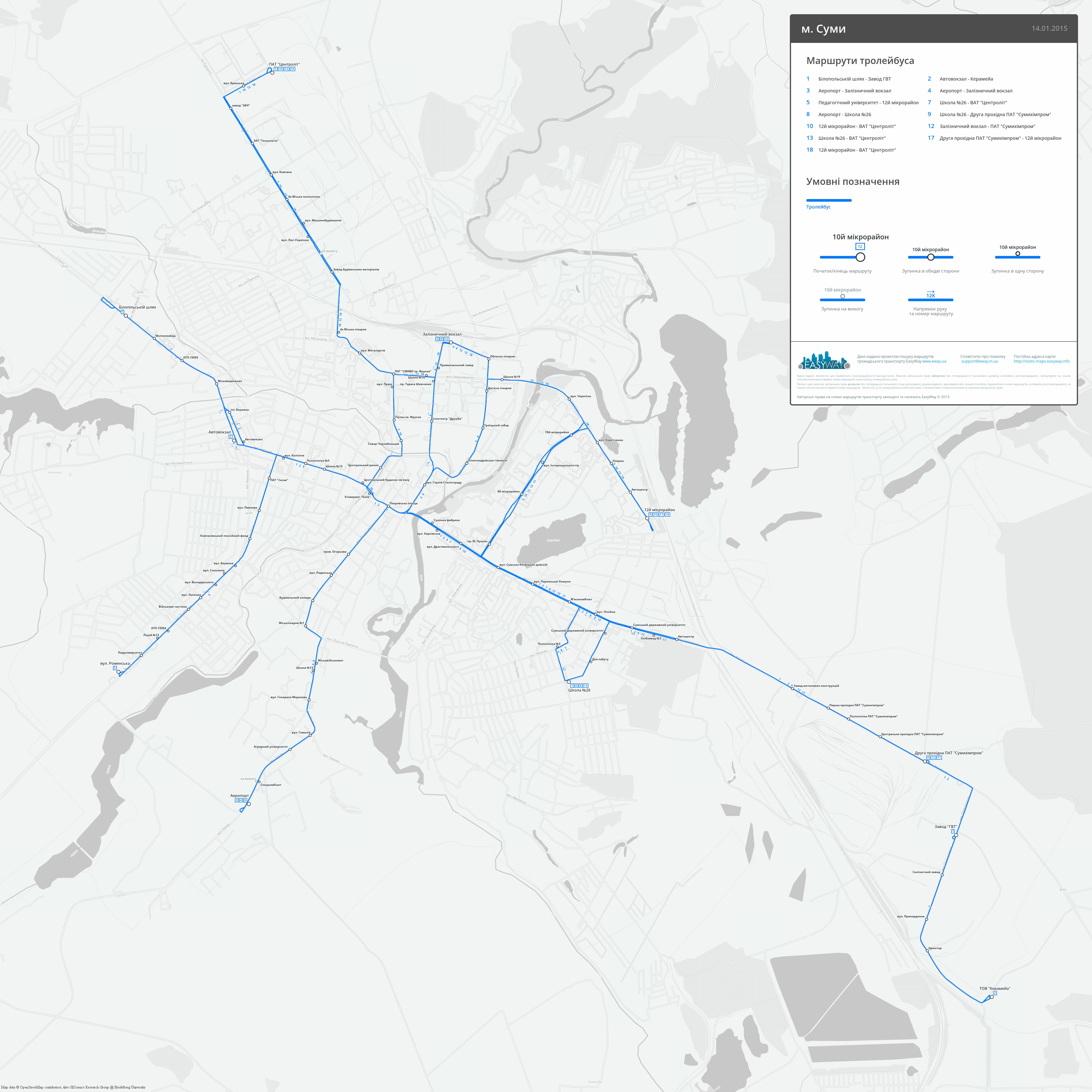
- Public transit network as of 2019

Operation
- Locale: Sumy, Sumy Oblast, Ukraine
- Open: August 25, 1967
- Routes: 16
- Operators: Sumy city council, Sumyelektroavtotrans

Infrastructure
- Depot: 1 (1 under construction)
- Stock: 72

Statistics
- Route length: 103 km (2019)
- 21,896 (2018)
- Website: http://troleybus.sumy.ua/

The Sumy trolleybus system forms part of the public transport network serving Sumy, in Sumy Oblast, Ukraine.

The owner of the trolleybus network is the Sumy city council, the passenger transportation is provided by KP SMR "Elektroavtotrans" (Sumyelektroavtotrans).

The trolleybus system in Sumy is one of the main types of public transport, covering both the central part and some remote neighborhoods.

== History ==
Trolleybus traffic in Sumy was opened on August 25, 1967. The first city trolleybus was "Khimmistechko – Railway Terminal". At the opening there were 25 used MTB-82 trolleybuses from Moscow and 10 new Kyiv-4 trolleybuses.

During the period from the day of opening of trolleybus traffic through the present time the enterprise was headed by 16 directors, from them O. F. Ivanov worked the most, for a period of 11 years (1987–1998).

Inventory number of trolleybuses in Sumy:

- 1980 — 128 (84 working).
- 1985 — 127 (88 working).
- 1990 — 145 (101 working).
- 2010 — 69 (52 working).
- 2015 — 68 (65 working).
- 2016 — 68 (60 working).
- 2017 — 68 (54 working).
- 2018 — 69 (59 working).
- 2019 — 73 (64 working).

In the crisis of 1990 Sumy managed to preserve the Sumy trolleybus network as a whole, but since 1991 no trolleybuses have been overhauled, and repair work has been carried out only to restore the hull and chassis. Given that half of the trolleybuses have a service life of 20–28 years, the condition of electrical equipment in Sumy is a matter of serious concern.

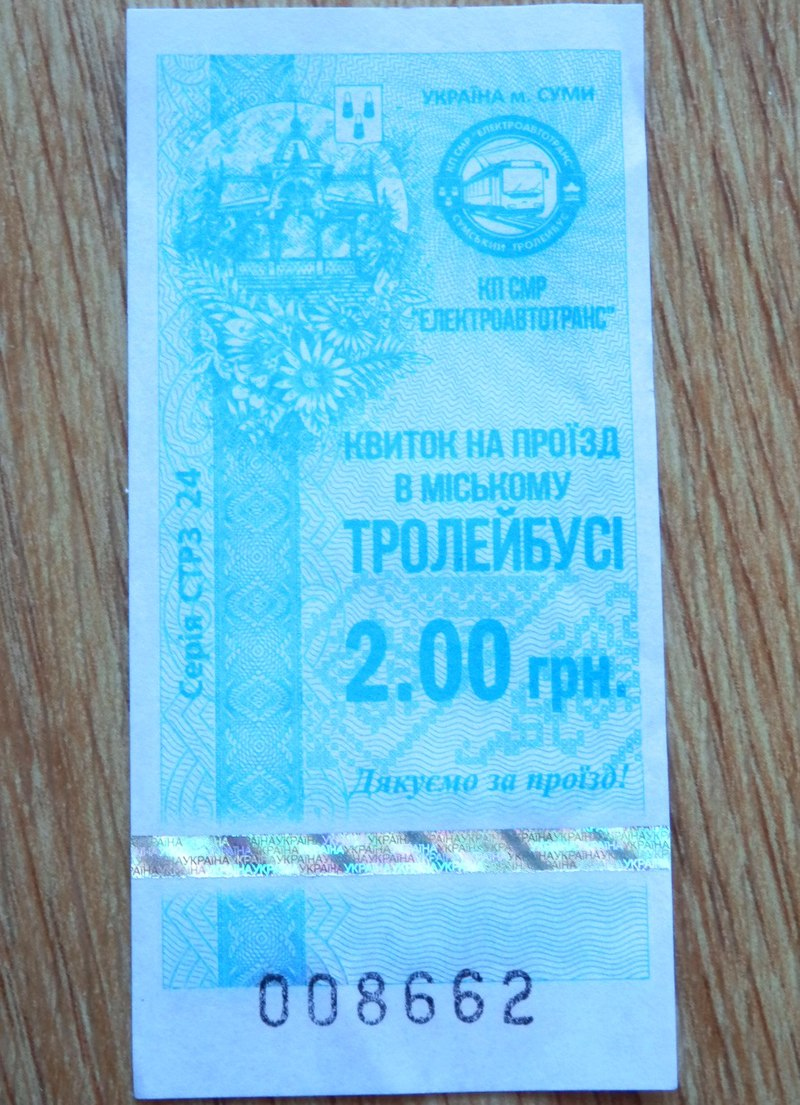
Trolleybus ticket, 2017

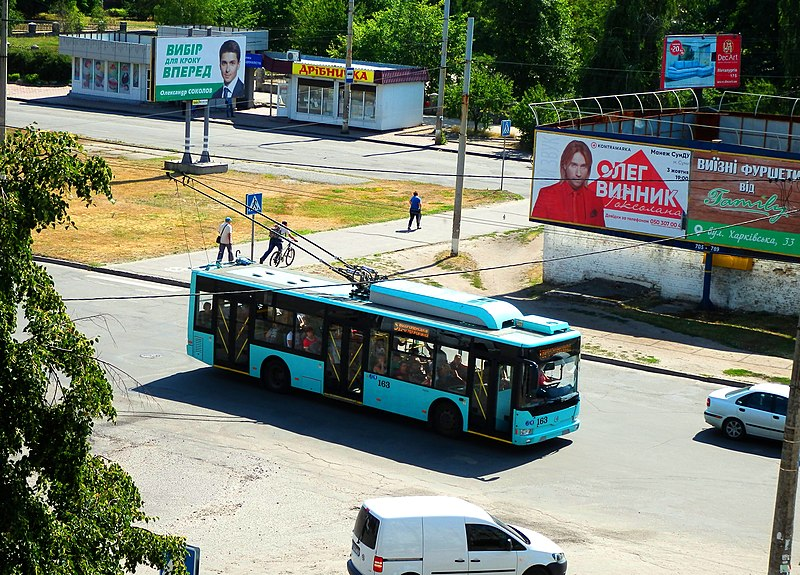
T12110 Etalon "Barvinok" on Mikhaila Lushpy Avenue

In 2009–2010, the company carried out purposeful work to stabilize the trolleybus fleet. Along with the optimization of the production process, the company has achieved that in 2009 to early 2010 there were 46–48 trolleybuses (in 2008 this figure was 38–30) on the line daily, of which due to breakdowns in the depot returns only 5–6 instead of 10–12 against last year's figures. The rolling stock use ratio at Sumyelektroavtotrans (according to its director) is one of the best in Ukraine.

Material and technical base and reorganization of the repair service allows Sumyelektroavtotrans to independently carry out medium and major repairs of trolleybuses, including electrical equipment. Currently, Sumyelektroavtotrans has developed a system of capital and medium repairs, taking into account the replacement of electrical wiring, or its restoration, where it is economically feasible.

From 2010 to 2015, 8 cars managed to pass the CWR. There were no purchases of the new RS in 2011–2014.

In 2015, Sumyelektroavtotrans purchased 12 Bogdan T70117 trolleybuses.

On January 25, 2020, Oleksandr Perchakov, director of the organization that operates the Sumy trolleybus network, Sumyelektroavtotrans, retired. There is currently a competition for the vacant position.

On March 12, 2020, a new director, Vitaliy Odnorog, was appointed. Also in 2020, the company received a license for the right to train trolleybus drivers.

In December 2021, KP "Elektroavtotrans" received 10 new trolleybuses, those same ones who waited until October 25 and because of which the local authorities even had to "fight" with the plant. At the request of the mayor, they were registered and released on the line. This acquisition made it possible to launch a new ring route - trolleybus No. 21.

== Fare ==
In 2016, the cost of a single trip was ₴1.25.

Following January 1, 2017, the cost of a single trip was ₴1.75.

And after April 1, 2017, the cost of a single trip was ₴2.00.

Following February 1, 2018, the fare was ₴2.50.

As of February 1, 2019, the fare is ₴4 (for schoolchildren and students ₴2).

== Routes ==
List of trolleybus lines.

Route	Terminus	Terminus	Times	Notes
1	Teplychnyi	Prykordonna Street	15–20 minutes	During rush hour goes to Sumykhimprom or to the depot
2	Bus Terminal	Kerameia	1 hour	
3	Railway Terminal	Airport	1 hour	Via Shevchenka Avenue counterclockwise
4	Railway Terminal	Airport	1 hour	Via Troitska Street clockwise
5	Romenska Street	Heroyiv Krut Street	10–15 minutes	
7	Khimmistechko	Tsentrolit Plant	10–15 minutes	
8	Airport	Khimmistechko	40 minutes	Works only on weekdays
9	Khimmistechko	Sumykhimprom	3 times per day	Works only during rush hour
10A	Boarding Home for Veterans	Heroyiv Krut Street	20–40 minutes	
12	Sumykhimprom	Railway Terminal	7 times per day	Works only during rush hour
13	Tsentrolit Plant	Khimmistechko	4 times per day	Via Railway Terminal, works only during rush hour
14	Heroyiv Krut Street	Airport		
15	Svobody Avenue	Svobody Avenue	30–40 minutes	Via Kharkivska Street, Central Market, Railway Terminal, Lushpy Avenue
15A	Svobody Avenue	Svobody Avenue	30–40 minutes	Via Lushpy Avenue, Railway Terminal, Central Market, Kharkivska Street
16	Tsentrolit Plant	Airport	3 times per day	Works only on weekdays
17	Sumykhimprom	Heroyiv Krut Street	3 times per day	Works only during rush hour
18	Tsentrolit Plant	Heroyiv Krut Street	9 times per day	Via Railway Terminal, works only during rush hour
20	Sumykhimprom	Svobody Avenue	3 times per day	Works only during rush hour
21	Boarding Home for Veterans	Railway Terminal		Via Bus Terminal, Illinska Street, Central Market, Troitska Street counterclockwise

=== Former routes ===
Former lines, not currently in service.

Route	Terminus	Terminus
6	SPTU-6	AZS-2
8	Romenska Street	Airport
10	Tsentrolit Plant	12th Microdistrict
11	Romenska Street	Airport

== Rolling stock ==
In November 2010, there were 69 trolleybuses and 5 new buses on the balance sheet of Sumielektroavtotrans. Of these, a "certified" 32 can go to active service, 20 need medium repair, and 18 need overhaul repair. According to Director Victor Chaly, presented at a meeting at the Sumy City Hall, 38 trolleybuses need medium and overhaul.

At the end of 2015, there were 68 trolleybuses and 20 buses in the Sumielektroavtotrans Depot.

The company also began to repair its rolling stock, although the cars were still undergoing KR / KVR. On December 19, 2014, the trolleybuses allegedly of their own production with depot numbers 284 (which since the summer of 2010 was not operated) with the nominal name "Sumchanin-2014", and number 257 under the name "Volunteer" were equipped with Wi-Fi as well as later in trolleybuses 080, 081, 072, 074, 005. Trolleybus number 236 is currently under repair.

On April 26, 2018, the first of four Etalon Т12110 «Barvinok» Trolleybuses arrived in Sumy.

=== Current fleet ===
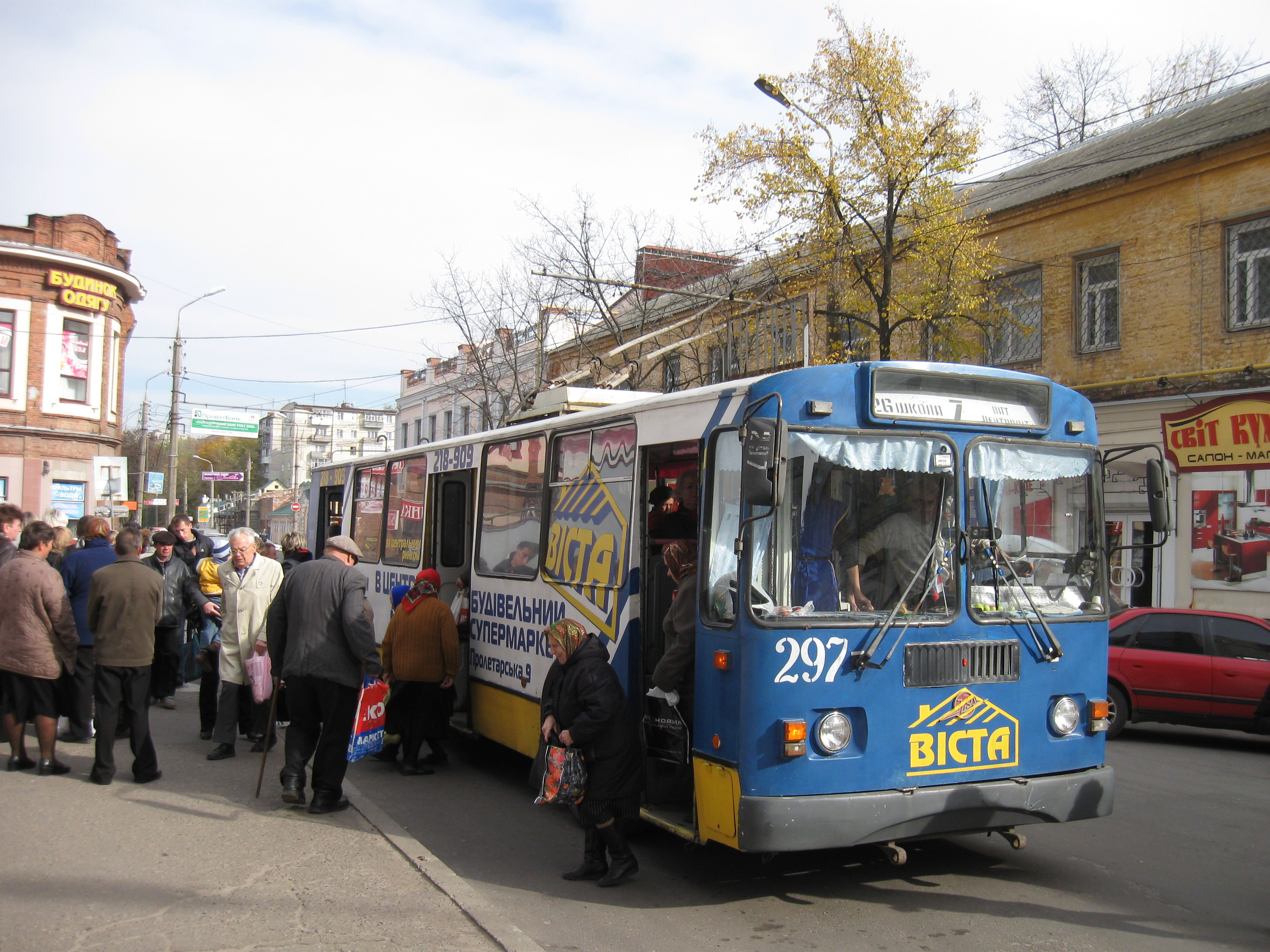
7 trolleybus on Cooperative Street

Model	Number of trolleybuses (as of March 1, 2020)
AKSM-321 (SP «Yanix»)	4
Bohdan Т70117	16
Etalon Т12110 «Barvinok»	4
ZiU-682	32
ZiU-6205	5
LAZ Е183	2
UMZ T1	1
UMZ T2	8
Total:	72

=== Service fleet ===
Model	Number of trolleybuses (as of March 1, 2020)
KTG-1	1

== Perspectives ==
In the framework of the project "Urban Public Transport in Ukraine" at the expense of borrowed funds from the European Investment Bank under state guarantees it is planned to purchase 22 trolleybuses worth 4 million euros.

== See also ==
- List of trolleybus systems in Ukraine
