= Sumy-Tovarna railway station =

Railway station in Sumy Oblast, Ukraine

Sumy–Tovarna Суми–Товарна

General information
- Location: Viyska Zaporozkoho Street, Sumy; Ukraine
- Coordinates: 50°53′42″N 34°51′14″E
- System: Southern Railways station
- Owner: Ukrzaliznytsia
- Line: Bilopillia–Basy
- Platforms: 2
- Tracks: 4

Other information
- Station code: 445400

History
- Opened: 1978

Services
Preceding station	Ukrzaliznytsia	Following station
Sumy	Southern Railways	Basy
Location

Sumy–Tovarna (Ukrainian: Суми–Товарна) is a railway station and major freight station in Sumy, Sumy Oblast, Ukraine. The station is on the Sumy Directorate of Southern Railways on the Bilopillia-Basy line. The station is the main station for freight loading and unloading for the city of Sumy.

Sumy-Tovarna is located in the Vasylivka neighborhood of Sumy, in between the city's main station (5 kilometres (3 mi) away) and Basy station (4 km (2 mi) away).

== Passenger service ==
Both passenger and suburban trains stop at Sumy-Tovarna station.

== Notes ==
- Tariff Guide No. 4. Book 1 (as of 05/15/2021) (Russian) Archived 05/15/2021.
- Arkhangelsky A.S., Arkhangelsky V.A. in two books. - M.: Transport, 1981. (rus.)
