= Sumy railway station =

Railway station in Sumy, Ukraine

Sumy Суми
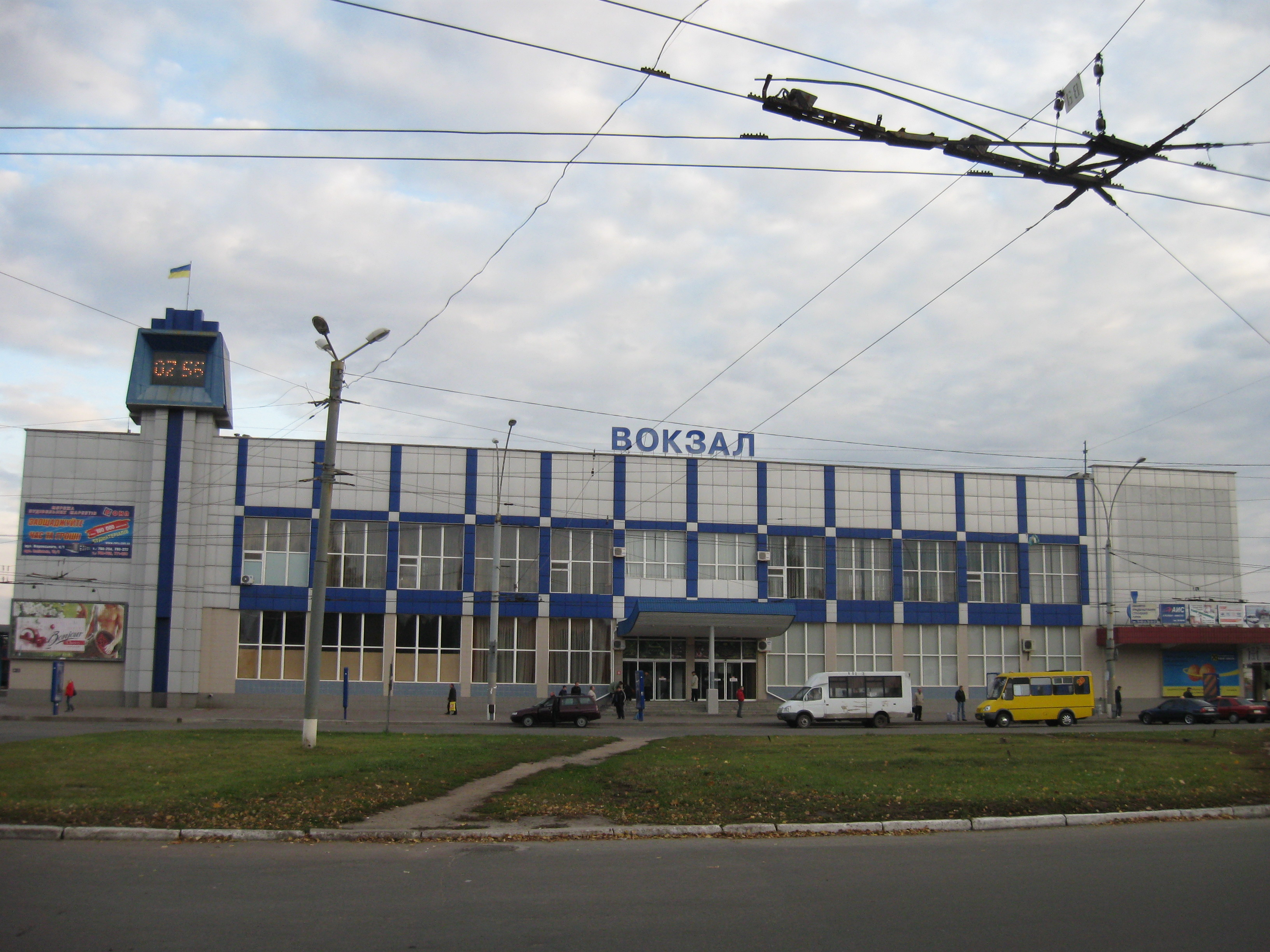

General information
- Location: Pryvokzalna Square, Sumy, Ukraine
- Coordinates: 50°26′26″N 30°29′22″E
- System: Southern Railways station
- Owner: Ukrzaliznytsia
- Line: Bilopillia - Basy
- Platforms: 3
- Tracks: 17

Construction
- Parking: Yes

Other information
- Station code: 445306

History
- Opened: 1878
- Rebuilt: 1948, 1982, 2005

Services
Preceding station	Ukrzaliznytsia	Following station
Toropylivka	Southern Railways	Sumy-Tovarna
Location

Sumy (Ukrainian: Суми) is a railway station in Sumy, Ukraine. It is a major freight and passenger station, the main one of the Sumy Directorate of Southern Railways on the Bilopillia-Basy line. It is located in the north of Kovpakivskyi District of Sumy.

== History ==
The construction of the railway from Vorozhba to Merefa in 1877 can be considered the beginning of the history of the Sumy-Pasazhyrskyi station, as this was when its foundation was laid.

In 1878, the sound of a steam locomotive was heard for the first time at the station, which marked the beginning of the rapid economic and cultural development of the city of Sumy.

In 1913, three trains departed from the station daily.

In 1948 the station was rebuilt after World War II.

In 1982 a new railway station building was built.

In 1999-2000, work was carried out to strengthen the foundations and load-bearing structures of the building, as there was a threat of destruction of the building.

During 2001-2005, the station was rebuilt. The ground floor of the station had been reconstructed and included a cash hall with five ticket offices, a waiting room for passengers, and a help desk.

On the second floor a modern service center with a hall of increased comfort was built and two ticket offices that serve long-distance and international passengers with travel documents reserved via the Internet. The second floor also includes a café-bar and a waiting room for long-distance and suburban passengers.

In 2005 the reconstruction of the station complex was completed; the platforms and Pryvokzalna Ploshcha were reconstructed.

In 2008, the renovation of the suburban hall was completed and five suburban ticket offices were rebuilt.

In the spring of 2016, work continued on the installation of a cash window with a low window sill for people with special needs, which was performed by the Sumy Construction and Installation Maintenance Department (BMEU-5) of Southern Railways.

Sumy station is equipped with modern video equipment, which is monitored around the clock by 27 video cameras. The help desk is equipped with a speaker workstation, which allows you to automatically provide up to 200 ads via speakerphone.

== Infrastructure ==
Approaches to the station are two-track. The switches are equipped with one-way automatic blocking.

The station is designed for 700 passengers and on average per day the station serves 1,929 long-distance and local passengers and 1,309 suburban passengers.

Facilities at the station include:

- a passenger waiting room;
- ticket offices with international, long-distance and suburban services;
- a stationary and automatic storage cameras;
- restrooms;
- a luggage compartment;
- four passenger platforms;
- a pedestrian bridge over the tracks.

The station's track layout consists of two parallel sections: receiving and sorting.

The average volume of loading and unloading is 18 cars. Cargo operations are carried out on three access tracks. The station loads cargo such as timber, grain, scrap metal, equipment, pipes, and construction materials; it unloads coal, gas, cement, and petroleum products.

== Passenger service ==
The station serves as a stop for passenger trains "Capital Express" Kharkiv - Kyiv, and Sumy - Kyiv.

National trains:

- Kyiv - Sumy;
- Lviv - Kharkiv;
- Uzhhorod - Kharkiv;
- Lviv - Sumy;
- Rakhiv - Sumy.

On May 26, 2016, the connection of north-western Sumy Oblast with the regional center was resumed with the appointment of night high-speed branded trains "Northern Express" Sumy - Shostka, and Sumy - Zernove, passing through the stations Bilopillia, Putyvl, Konotop, Krolevets, and Tereshchenska (in a day). From May 26, 2016 to June 10, 2017, the train ran to Novhorod-Siverskyi 4 times a week, which from June 11, 2017 limited the route to Shostka station.

Suburban communication from Sumy station is carried out to Okhtyrka, Basy, Bilopillia, Virynskyi Zavod, Vorozhba, Kyrykivka, Lebedynska, and Pushkarne stations.

== Notes ==
- Tariff Guide No. 4. Book 1 (as of 05/15/2021) (Russian) Archived 05/15/2021.
- Arkhangelsky A.S., Arkhangelsky V.A. in two books. - M.: Transport, 1981. (rus.)
