= UMY =

UMY may refer to:

- Muhammadiyah University of Yogyakarta, a private university under affiliation of Muhammadiyah in Yogyakarta, Indonesia
- UMY, the IATA code for Sumy Airport, Sumy Oblast, Ukraine
