= Stepanivka, Sumy Oblast =

Rural locality in Sumy Oblast, Ukraine

Stepanivka Степанівка
- Rural settlement
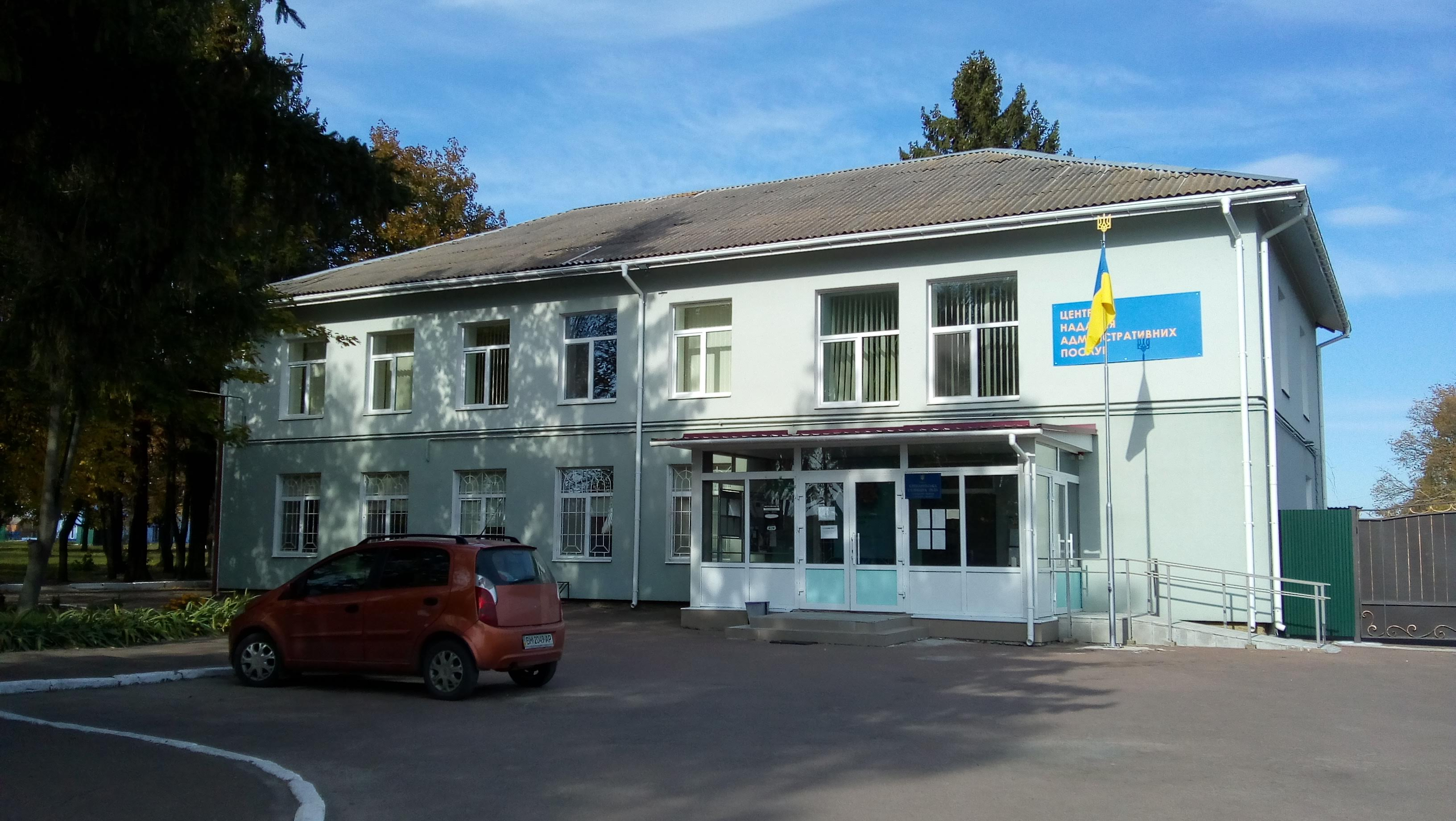
- Local administration building

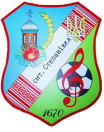
- Coat of arms

- Location in Sumy Oblast Location in Ukraine
- Country: Ukraine
- Oblast: Sumy Oblast
- Raion: Sumy Raion
- Hromada: Stepanivka settlement hromada

Population (2022)
  - Total: 5,301
- Time zone: UTC+2 (EET)
  - Summer (DST): UTC+3 (EEST)

Stepanivka (Ukrainian: Степанівка, Russian: Степановка) is a rural settlement in Sumy Raion, Sumy Oblast, in north-eastern Ukraine. It is located on the left bank of the Sumka, a right tributary of the Psel, in the drainage basin of the Dnieper. Stepanivka hosts the administration of Stepanivka settlement hromada, one of the hromadas of Ukraine. Population: 5,301 (2022 estimate).

Until 26 January 2024, Stepanivka was designated urban-type settlement. On this day, a new law entered into force which abolished this status, and Stepanivka became a rural settlement.

== Economy ==
=== Transportation ===
Toropylivka railway station is located in the settlement, on the railway connecting Vorozhba with Kharkiv via Sumy. There is infrequent passenger traffic.

Stepanivka has road access to Sumy and to Konotop via Terny.
