= Holovashivka railway station =

Railway station in Sumy Oblast, Ukraine

Holovashivka Головашівка

General information
- Coordinates: 50°58′26″N 34°34′22″E
- System: Southern Railways station
- Owner: Ukrzaliznytsia
- Line: Bilopillia–Basy
- Platforms: 2
- Tracks: 4

Other information
- Station code: 445109

History
- Opened: 1878

Services
| Preceding station | Ukrzaliznytsia | Following station |
|---|---|---|
| Ambary | Southern Railways | Toropylivka |
Location

Holovashivka (Ukrainian: Головашівка) is a railway station in Holovashivka, Sumy Oblast, Ukraine. The station serves as a minor passenger station as well as a minor freight yard. It is on the Sumy Branch of Southern Railways on the Bilopillia–Basy line.

Holovashivka is located between the stations of Ambary (8 kilometres (5 mi) away) and Toropylivka (also 8 km (5 mi) away).

== Passenger service ==
Only suburban trains stop at Holovashivka station.

== Notes ==
- Tariff Guide No. 4. Book 1 (as of 05/15/2021) (Russian) Archived 05/15/2021.
- Ukraine. Atlas of Railways. Mirilo 1: 750 000. - K .: DNVP "Cartography", 2008. - 80 p. - ISBN 978-966-475-082-7.
