= Nyzy railway station =

Railway station in Sumy Oblast, Ukraine

Nyzy Низи

General information
- Coordinates: 50°46′25″N 34°45′50″E
- System: Southern Railways terminus
- Owner: Ukrzaliznytsia
- Line: Imeni Vasylia Nesvita–Nyzy
- Platforms: 1
- Tracks: 3

Other information
- Station code: 445700

History
- Opened: 1905

Services
Preceding station	Ukrzaliznytsia	Following station
Terminus	Southern Railways	Imeni Vasylia Nesvita
Location

Nyzy (Ukrainian: Низи) is a railway station in Nyzy, Sumy Oblast, Ukraine. The station is a terminus station on the Imeni Vasylia Nesvita-Nyzy line of the Sumy Directorate of Southern Railways. The distance to Imeni Vasylia Nesvita is 11 kilometres (7 mi).

The station serves only freight trains from Imeni Vasylia Nesvita station. The movement of trains is organized by means of an electric rod system and telephone. This station provides services for the reception and delivery of goods by car and small shipments, which are loaded with whole cars. Thus loading is conducted only on access tracks and in places not public.

== History ==
Nyzy station opened in 1905, when a 10-kilometre (6 mi) railway line was laid from Hrebinnykivka station to the Sukhanov sugar factory (currently inoperable).

== Passenger service ==
On November 16, 2010, the movement of railcars was opened on the Hrebinnykivka (now Imeni Vasylya Nesvita) - Nyzy line. But despite the low fare of the rail bus, it was unclaimed, and was soon canceled.

== Notes ==
- Tariff Guide No. 4. Book 1 (as of 05/15/2021) (Russian) Archived 05/15/2021.
