= Krasnopillia railway station =

Railway station in Sumy Oblast, Ukraine

Krasnopillia Краснопілля
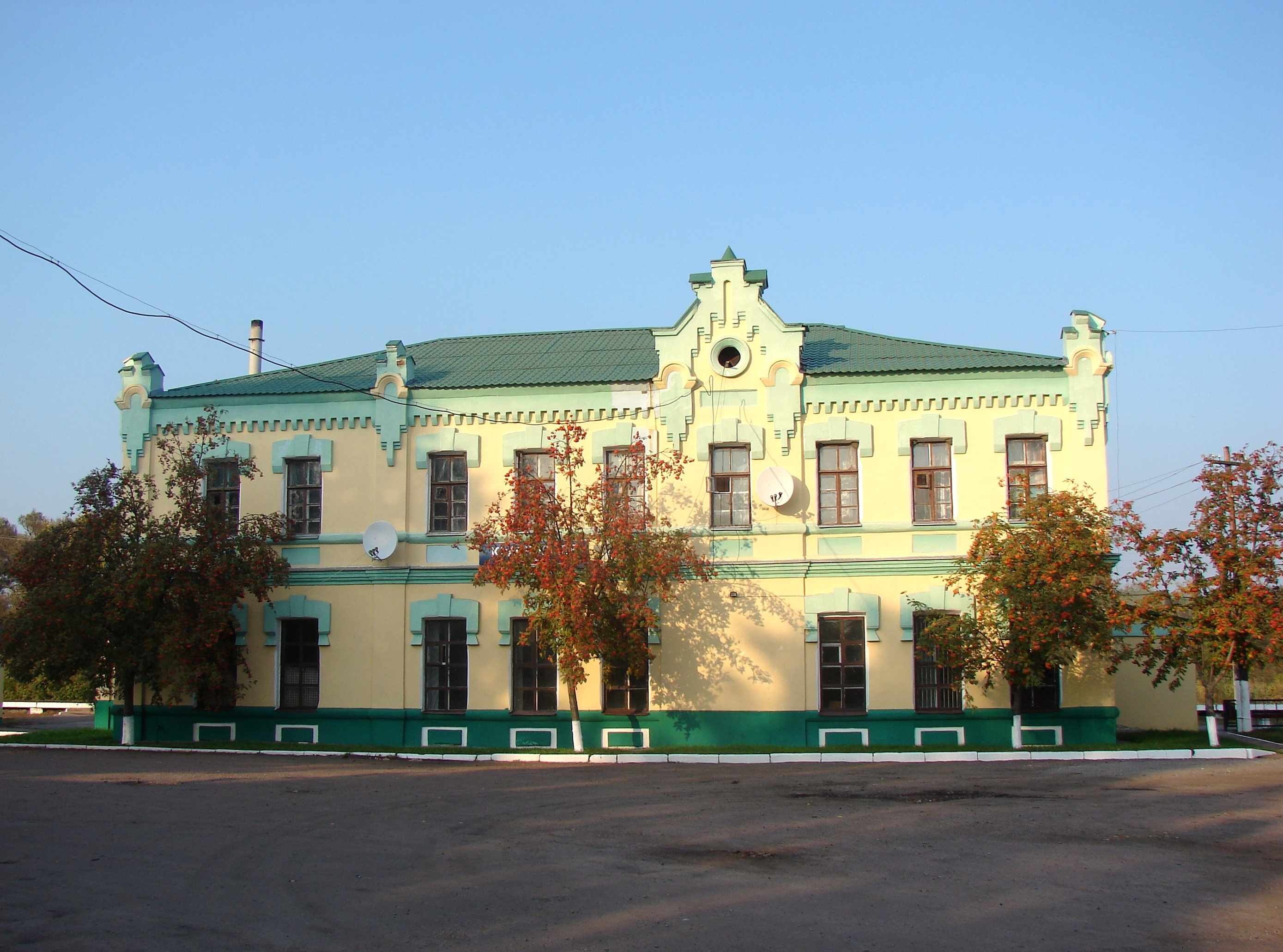

General information
- Coordinates: 50°46′59″N 35°15′28″E
- System: Southern Railways station
- Owner: Ukrzaliznytsia
- Line: Basy–Pushkarne
- Platforms: 1
- Tracks: 4

Other information
- Station code: 433703

History
- Opened: 1901

Services
Preceding station	Ukrzaliznytsia	Following station
Korchakivka	Southern Railways	Pushkarne

Immovable Monument of Local Significance of Ukraine
- Official name: Залізничний вокзал (Railway station building)
- Type: Architecture, History
- Reference no.: 3512-См
Location

Krasnopillia (Ukrainian: Краснопілля) is a railway station in Krasnopillia, Sumy Oblast, Ukraine. The station is on the Sumy Directorate of Southern Railways on the Basy-Pushkarne line.

Krasnopillia is located in between Korchakivka and Pushkarne stations.

== Passenger service ==
Only suburban trains stop at Krasnopillia station.

== Notes ==
- Tariff Guide No. 4. Book 1 (as of 05/15/2021) (Russian) Archived 05/15/2021.
- Arkhangelsky A.S., Arkhangelsky V.A. in two books. - M.: Transport, 1981. (rus.)
