= Vyry railway station =

Railway station in Sumy Oblast, Ukraine

Vyry Вири

General information
- Coordinates: 51°01′15″N 34°22′29″E
- System: Southern Railways station
- Owner: Ukrzaliznytsia
- Line: Bilopillia–Basy
- Platforms: 2
- Tracks: 5

Other information
- Station code: 444905

History
- Opened: c. 1900

Services
Preceding station	Ukrzaliznytsia	Following station
Torokhtianyi	Southern Railways	Ambary
Location

Vyry (Ukrainian: Вири) is a railway station in Bilany, Sumy Oblast, Ukraine. The station is on the Sumy Directorate of Southern Railways on the Bilopillia-Basy line.

Vyry is located in between Torokhtianyi (10 kilometres (6 mi) away) and Ambary (7 km (4 mi) away) stations.

== Passenger service ==
Both passenger and suburban trains stop at Vyry station.

== Notes ==
- Tariff Guide No. 4. Book 1 (as of 05/15/2021) (Russian) Archived 05/15/2021.
- Arkhangelsky A.S., Arkhangelsky V.A. in two books. - M.: Transport, 1981. (rus.)
