= Zolotnytskyi railway station =

Railway station in Sumy Oblast, Ukraine

Zolotnytskyi Золотницький

General information
- Coordinates: 50°39′40″N 35°01′32″E
- System: Southern Railways station
- Owner: Ukrzaliznytsia
- Line: Basy–Pushkarne
- Platforms: 1
- Tracks: 2

Other information
- Station code: 433826

History
- Opened: 1906

Services
Preceding station	Ukrzaliznytsia	Following station
Basy	Southern Railways	Korchakivka
Location

Zolotnytskyi (Ukrainian: Золотницький) is a railway station in Stinka, Sumy Oblast, Ukraine. The station is on the Sumy Directorate of Southern Railways on the Basy-Pushkarne line.

Zolotnytskyi is located in between Basy and Korchakivka stations.

== Passenger service ==
Only suburban trains stop at Zolotnytskyi station.

== Notes ==
- Tariff Guide No. 4. Book 1 (as of 05/15/2021) (Russian) Archived 05/15/2021.
- Arkhangelsky A.S., Arkhangelsky V.A. in two books. - M.: Transport, 1981. (rus.)
