= Torokhtianyi railway station =

Railway station in Sumy Oblast, Ukraine

Torokhtianyi Торохтяний
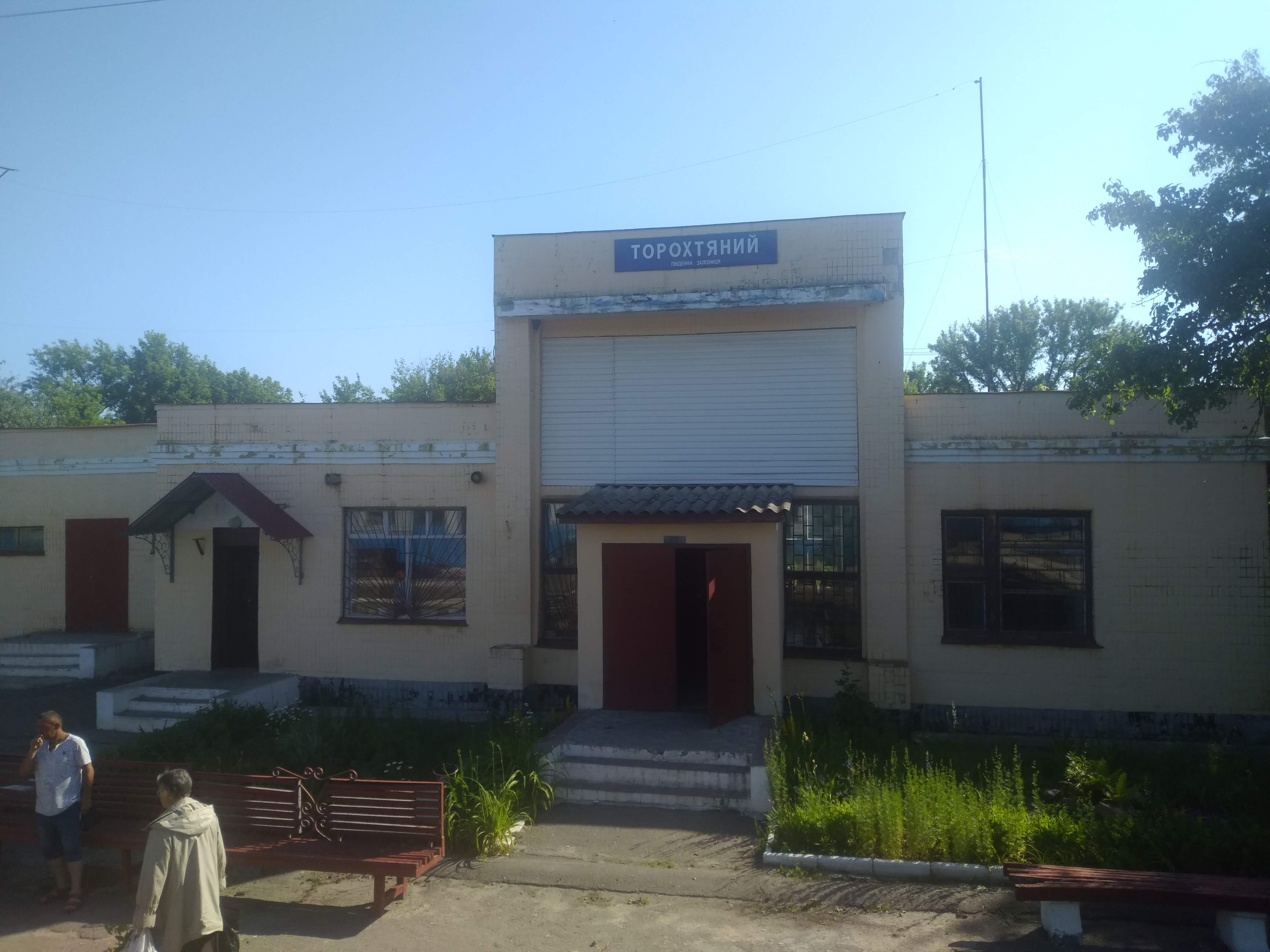

General information
- Coordinates: 51°05′35″N 34°18′15″E
- System: Southern Railways station
- Owner: Ukrzaliznytsia
- Line: Bilopillia–Basy
- Platforms: 2
- Tracks: 3

Other information
- Station code: 444801

History
- Opened: 1905

Services
Preceding station	Ukrzaliznytsia	Following station
Bilopillia	Southern Railways	Vyry
Location

Torokhtianyi (Ukrainian: Торохтяний) is a railway station in Voronivka, Sumy Oblast, Ukraine. It is on the Bilopillia-Basy line of the Sumy Directorate of Southern Railways.

The station is located between Vyry (10 kilometres (6 mi) away) and Bilopillia (6 km (4 mi) away) stations.

== Passenger service ==
The station serves both passenger and suburban train on a limited schedule.

== Notes ==
- Tariff Guide No. 4. Book 1 (as of 05/15/2021) (Russian) Archived 05/15/2021.
- Arkhangelsky A.S., Arkhangelsky V.A. in two books. - M.: Transport, 1981. (rus.)
