= Pushkarne railway station =

Railway station in Sumy Oblast, Ukraine

Pushkarne

General information
- Coordinates: 50°43′33″N 35°26′48″E
- System: Southern Railways station
- Owner: Ukrzaliznytsia
- Lines: Basy–Pushkarne; Pushkarne–Ilyok-Penkovka
- Platforms: 1
- Tracks: 2

Other information
- Station code: 433614

History
- Opened: 1921

Services
Preceding station	Ukrzaliznytsia	Following station
Krasnopillia	Southern Railways	Ilyok-Penkovka
Location

Pushkarne (Ukrainian: Пушкарне) is a railway station located a few hundred meters from the village of Hrabovske (formerly Pushkarne) in Sumy Oblast, Ukraine. The station is on the Sumy Directorate of Southern Railways on the Basy-Pushkarne and Pushkarne-Ilyok-Penkovka lines.

Pushkarne station is located in between Krasnopillya and Ilyok-Penkovka stations slightly west of the border with Russia.

On the Ukrainian side is a dead end for diesel trains going over the Sumy - Pushkarne route. The station is also responsible for carrying out border control for travel into Russia on the Pushkarne-Ilyok-Penkovka line.

== Passenger service ==
As of early 2019, only suburban trains stop at Pushkarne station.

== Notes ==
- Tariff Guide No. 4. Book 1 (as of 05/15/2021) (Russian) Archived 05/15/2021.
- Arkhangelsky A.S., Arkhangelsky V.A. in two books. - M.: Transport, 1981. (rus.)
