= Basy railway station =

Railway station in Sumy Oblast, Ukraine

Basy Баси

General information
- Location: Mykoly Lukasha Street, Novi Basy; Sumy, Ukraine
- Coordinates: 50°51′43″N 34°53′12″E
- System: Southern Railways station
- Owner: Ukrzaliznytsia
- Lines: Bilopillia - Basy; Basy - Boromlia; Basy - Pushkarne
- Platforms: 2
- Tracks: 17

Other information
- Station code: 445607

History
- Opened: 1901

Services
Preceding station	Ukrzaliznytsia	Following station
Sumy-Tovarna	Southern Railways	Zolotnytskyi
Sumy-Tovarna	Southern Railways	Syrovatka
Location

Basy (Ukrainian: Баси) is a railway station in the city of Sumy, Ukraine. The station is at a junction with the Basy-Pushkarne line and serves as a passenger and minor freight station. It is located in the southeastern part of the city in the Novi Basy neighborhood, and is on the Sumy Directorate of Southern Railways on the Bilopillia-Basy, Basy-Boromlia, and Basy-Pushkarne lines.

Basy is located between Sumy-Tovarna, Syrovatka, and Zolotnytskyi stations in the Novi Basy neighborhood of Zaricnhyi District of Sumy.

== Notes ==
- Tariff Guide No. 4. Book 1 (as of 05/15/2021) (Russian) Archived 05/15/2021.
