= Syrovatka railway station =

Railway station in Sumy Oblast, Ukraine

Syrovatka Сироватка

General information
- Coordinates: 50°47′51″N 34°51′51″E
- System: Southern Railways station
- Owner: Ukrzaliznytsia
- Line: Basy–Boromlia
- Platforms: 2
- Tracks: 4

Other information
- Station code: 445630

History
- Opened: 1878

Services
Preceding station	Ukrzaliznytsia	Following station
Basy	Southern Railways	Imeni Vasylia Nesvita
Location

Syrovatka (Ukrainian: Сироватка) is a railway station in Nyzhnia Syrovatka, Sumy Oblast, Ukraine. The station is on the Sumy Directorate of Southern Railways on the Basy-Boromlya line.

Syrovatka is located between Basy (9 kilometres (6 mi) away) and Imeni Vasylia Nesvita (7 km (4 mi) away) stations.

== History ==
In May 2016, the construction of a ramp for people with disabilities at the entrance to the waiting room of the station building at Syrovatka was completed by the Sumy Construction and Installation Maintenance Department (BMEU-5) of Southern Railways.

== Passenger service ==
Both passenger and suburban trains stop at Syrovatka station.

== Notes ==
- Tariff Guide No. 4. Book 1 (as of 05/15/2021) (Russian) Archived 05/15/2021.
- Arkhangelsky A.S., Arkhangelsky V.A. in two books. - M.: Transport, 1981. (rus.)
