= Korchakivka railway station =

Railway station in Sumy Oblast, Ukraine

Korchakivka Корчаківка

General information
- Coordinates: 50°49′11″N 35°08′13″E
- System: Southern Railways station
- Owner: Ukrzaliznytsia
- Line: Basy–Pushkarne
- Platforms: 1
- Tracks: 3

Other information
- Station code: 433807

History
- Opened: 1922

Services
Preceding station	Ukrzaliznytsia	Following station
Zolotnytskyi	Southern Railways	Krasnopillia
Location

Korchakivka (Ukrainian: Корчаківка) is a railway station in Samotoivka, Sumy Oblast, Ukraine. The station is on the Sumy Directorate of Southern Railways on the Basy-Pushkarne line.

Korchakivka is located in between Zolotnytskyi and Krasnopillia stations.

== Passenger service ==
Only suburban trains stop at Korchakivka station.

== Notes ==
- Tariff Guide No. 4. Book 1 (as of 05/15/2021) (Russian) Archived 05/15/2021.
- Arkhangelsky A.S., Arkhangelsky V.A. in two books. - M.: Transport, 1981. (rus.)
