= Viktor Ostapchuk =

Ukrainian railway administrator and politician

Viktor Ostapchuk Віктор Миколайович Остапчу́к
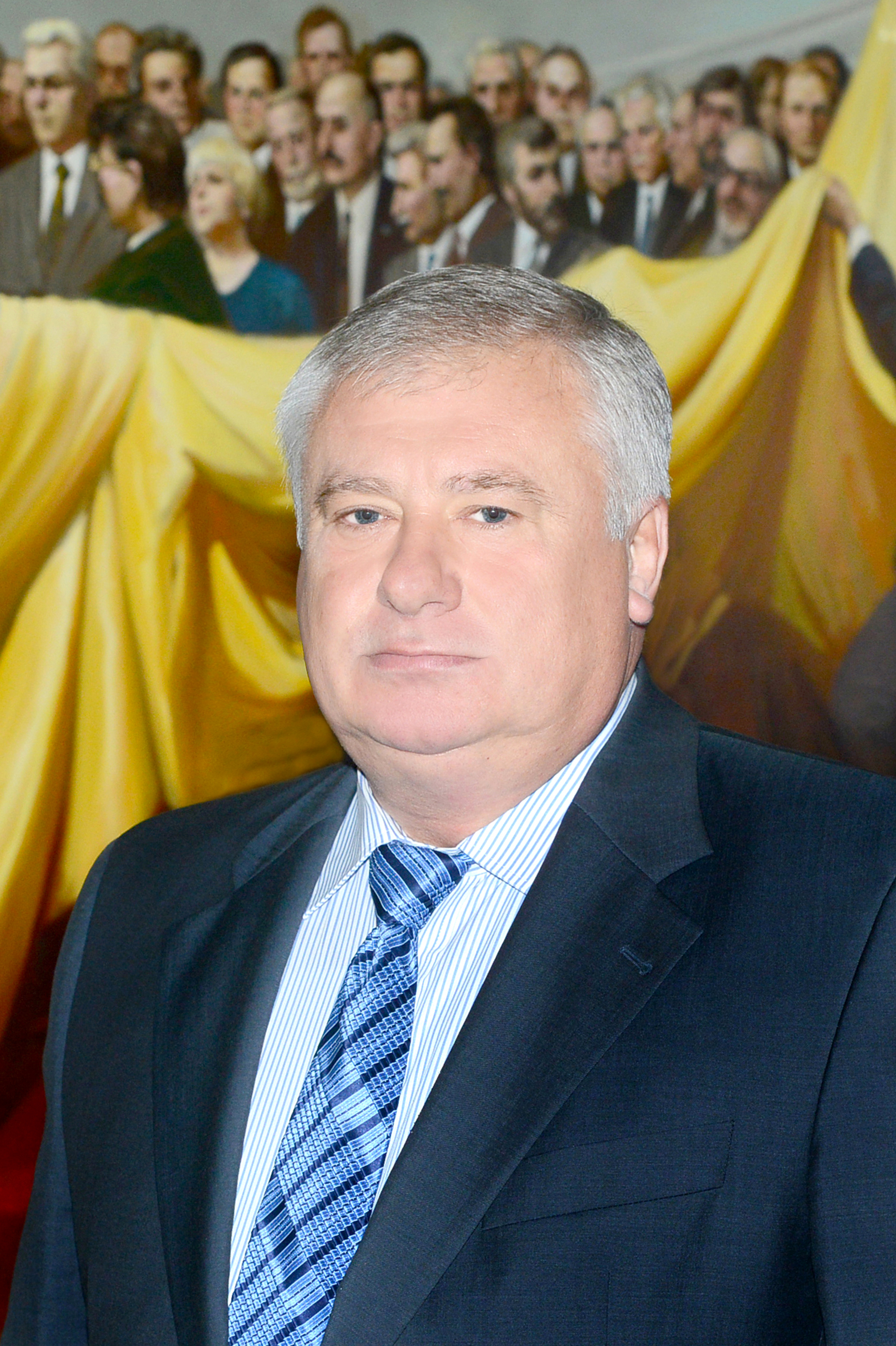

People's Deputy of Ukraine
- In office 27 November 2014 – 24 July 2019

Personal details
- Born: Viktor Ostapchuk; 16 May 1955 (age 70) Magnitogorsk, Russian SFSR, Soviet Union
- Party: Revival (Ukraine)

Viktor Mykolaiovych Ostapchuk (Ukrainian: Віктор Миколайович Остапчу́к, 16 May 1955) is a Ukrainian railway administrator and later Ukrainian parliamentary (People's Deputy of Ukraine of the 7th and 8th convocations), He is a Doctor of Technical Science and is honored as a Hero of Ukraine.

He is known for his work at the Ukrainian Southern Railways where under his leadership number of rail-lines were electrified.

== Origin ==
He was born on May 16, 1955, in Magnitogorsk, Chelyabinsk Oblast, where his family was evacuated from Zhytomyr Oblast at the beginning of the war.

== Education ==
From 1972 to 1977 studied in Kharkiv Institute of Railway Engineers named after S.M.Kirov (now Ukrainian State University of Railway Transport) at mechanic faculty “Diesel Electric Locomotives and Management System”

In 2000 he graduated a refresher course and advanced professional training at the Kharkiv Academy of Railway Transport (now Ukrainian State University of Railway Transport) getting his master's degree in specialty «Railway rolling stock and special railway transport. Locomotives», same year Ostapchuk conferred a Candidate of Technical Science degree in specialty «Car building Technology», another candidate degree he conferred in 2007 in the Department of materials and technologies of transport products issued at the Ukrainian Academy of Railway Transport

In March 2012 he received a degree of Doctor of Technical Science on specialty in Use and Repairing of Transport Means.

In January 2014 he was conferred a degree of Professor of the Department of materials and technologies of transport products producing of Ukrainian Academy of Railway Transport.

== Career ==
Ostapchuk started out in late 1970s at the Kirov locomotive shop located near Osnova railway station in Kharkiv. Since early 1980s and until 2012 he worked at leadership positions within the Southern Railways.

== Parliamentarian ==
From 2012 to 2014 Ostapchuk served as the people's deputy of Ukraine of the 7th convocation. Ostapchuk was one of the 36 members of the Party of regions faction (who consisted of 96 deputies) who voted in favour of the impeachment of President Viktor Yanukovych in February 2014. On November 27, 2014, he was elected people's deputy of Ukraine of the 8th convocation, elected at district #177 in Kharkiv Oblast by self-nomination. Ostapchuk was again a candidate of the Opposition Bloc, in election district #177 during the 2019 Ukrainian parliamentary election, but he finished in second place with 26.97% of the votes, and thus lost his parliamentary seat to Dmytro Liubota of Servant of the People who gained 40.26% of the votes.

== State awards and honourable distinctions ==
- Title of Hero of Ukraine (with Order of State) – 2004;
- Order of Merit, III stage – 2003;
- Order of Yaroslav the Wise, V stage – 2009;
- Order of Friendship – 2010;
- Honorary degree «The Honored Railroad Worker of Ukraine» – 2001;
- Merit certificates of the Verkhovna Rada of Ukraine, 2001, 2004;
- National Award of Ukraine in architecture for complex regeneration historic-architectural surrounding and station monuments in Kharkiv and Kharkiv Oblast – 2004;
