= Vorozhba railway station =

Railway station in Sumy Oblast, Ukraine

Vorozhba Ворожба
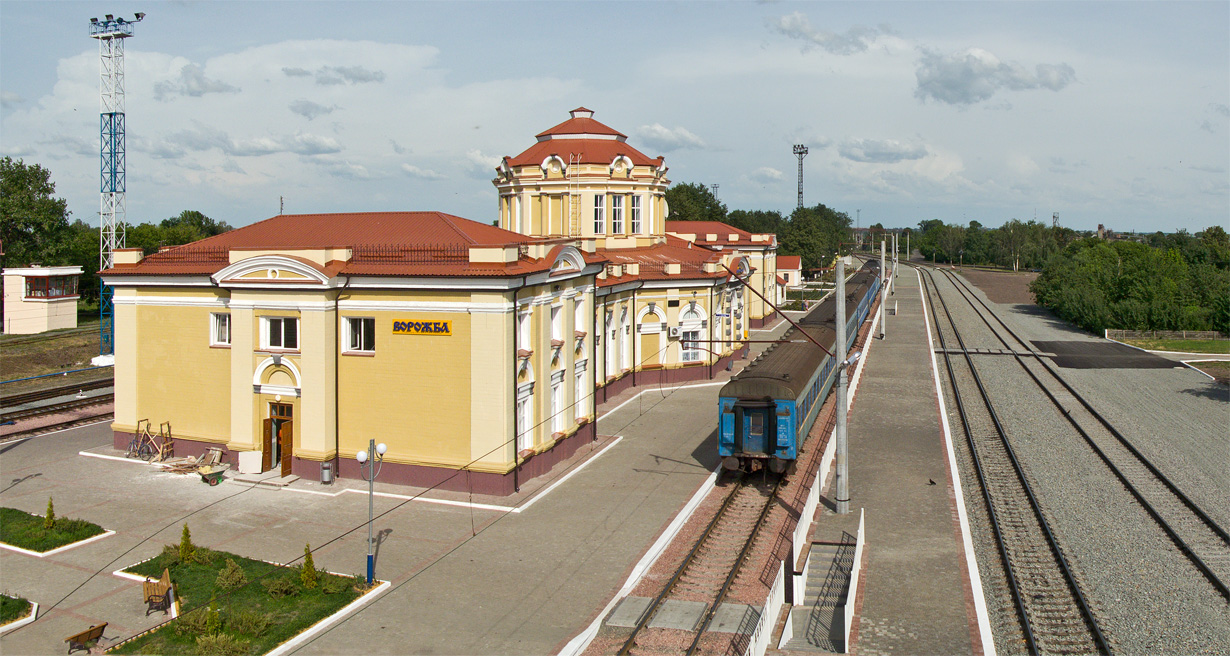

General information
- Coordinates: 51°10′12″N 34°13′28″E
- System: Southwestern Railways station
- Owner: Ukrzaliznytsia
- Lines: Khutir-Mikhailivskyi–Vorozhba; Vorozhba–Konotop; Vorozhba–Volfyne; Bilopillia–Vorozhba
- Platforms: 3
- Tracks: 9

Construction
- Parking: Yes

Other information
- Station code: 329302

History
- Opened: 1868
- Rebuilt: 1898, 1998, 2010

Services
Preceding station	Ukrzaliznytsia	Following station
Babakivka	Southwestern Railways	Bilopillia
Tiotkino	Southwestern Railways	Volfyne

Immovable Monument of Local Significance of Ukraine
- Official name: Вокзал залізничної станції Ворожба (Building of the Vorozhba railway station)
- Type: Architecture
- Reference no.: 3046-См
Location

Vorozhba (Ukrainian: Ворожба) is a railway station in Vorozhba, Ukraine. It is a major passenger and freight station at the junction of the Khutir-Mykhailivskyi-Konotop, Vorozhba-Konotop, Vorozhba-Volfyne, and Bilopillia-Vorozhba lines of Southwestern Railways.

== History ==
The station was founded in 1868.

In 1894, the Vorozhba-Seredyna-Buda (now Zernove station) narrow-gauge railway was put into operation, and in 1915 it was rebuilt on a wide track. The Moscow-Kyiv-Voronezh Railway Joint-Stock Company built locomotive and wagon workshops at Vorozhba Junction in the early 1890s. The economic importance of the node grew. Mainly bread was exported, and coal materials, salt, etc. were delivered.

At the end of the 19th and the beginning of the 20th centuries, the following stations were built on the Vorozhba-Kyiv line: Putyvl, Hruzke, Konotop, Bakhmach, Plysky, Kruty, Nizhyn, Nosivka, Kobyzhchi, Bobrovytsia, and Bobryk. And along the Kursk line Volfyne, Hlushkovo, Kornevo, Kolontaivka, Artakovo, Lgov-Kievskiy, Lukashovka, Dyakonovo and Kursk.

The importance of the Vorozhba railway station, which after a while became a hub, grew. The formation and development of the Vorozhba station made significant changes in the development of the region's economy. Prior to the Kursk-Kyiv railway, Bilopillya served as a place to gather flour and oats. Rye flour from nearby cities was distributed partly in Sumy and Lebedyn raions to local distilleries and sent to the city of Hlukhiv, Chernigov Governorate. They were followed by the Desna River and Russia. Wheat flour and oats were also sent to the northwest – to Chernihiv and Vitebsk Oblasts. Part of the oats was sold in Kremenchuk, and rye was sold on the Don River.

After the construction of the Kursk-Kyiv railway, the nature and volume of trade in the city of Bilopillya changed. If earlier trade went with Hlukhiv, and from there to the Desna River and further, now from Bilopillya production went on the Kursk-Kyiv railway. The bulk of grain was exported abroad to Prussia.

Intensive railway construction led to significant changes in the railway junction at Vorozhba. A railway settlement grew around the station. In 1887 there were 557 people.

On November 26, 1888, train traffic was opened on the Vorozhba-Kursk section of the Kursk-Kyiv railway. Passenger traffic increased incomparably. The question of building a new station arose urgently. At the end of the 19th century, its construction began, and in the summer of 1898 the new station of the Vorozhba station was consecrated and solemnly opened.

After the liquidation of the Ukrainian People's Republic, restoration work began at the Vorozhba railway junction. They were held in difficult conditions. But, despite this, at the end of the recovery period, the railway junction was working at full capacity. More cargo was accepted and sent here than in 1913. Thus, during 1925–1926, 18.4 thousand tons of cargo arrived at the station, and 41.4 thousand tons were sent.

Vorozhba station is classified as a class three station in terms of the volume of work performed, and in terms of the process of passenger traffic formation it is a major transit station. From the station you can depart in both Kyiv and Kharkiv directions. An average of 450 passengers leave the station per day during the year.

Vorozhba station is a precinct station, classified as class one in terms of the amount of work performed, and is an interstate transmission station to the Moscow Railway.

At the end of 2009, active work on electrification of the Konotop-Vorozhba section began. On June 17, 2010, the electrified route was inaugurated together with the reconstructed Vorozhba station, built in 1888. A temporary mobile traction substation was put into operation at the station, and a stationary one is planned to be built in the future.

== Infrastructure ==
In 1898, at the expense of the Kharkiv-Mykolaiv and Kursk-Kyiv railways, a new building of the Vorozhba station was built, designed by Kyiv architect Mykola Jurgens. The station building had two facades facing east and west. There was a waiting room in one wing of the station, and a restaurant in the other. In the extreme right part of the eastern facade there was a technical department and a customs post. In the extreme left part of the western facade there were offices of the station chief, the deputy chief of the station, the station duty officer, the accounting department and the hall for scheduled briefings. In the central part of the station there were ticket offices and a branch of "ExpressBank". Architect Jurgens sought to design a building which embodied a vision of the future. The building is a notable example of the city’s architecture and occupies a prominent position among Ukraine’s railway stations

The station building was most recently renovated in 1998.

== Passenger service ==
At Vorozhba station all long-distance passenger trains and suburban trains stop, including the "Capital Express" (Kharkiv-Kyiv and Sumy-Kyiv).

National trains:

- Lysychansk – Uzhhorod;
- Kyiv – Kostiantynivka;
- Kharkiv – Uzhhorod;
- Zernove – Sumy;
- Shostka – Sumy;
- Kyiv – Kharkiv;
- Kyiv – Sumy;
- Vorozhba – Fastiv

International trains:

- Minsk – Zaporizhzhya (in summer the train route is extended to Novooleksiivka station);
- Kharkiv – St. Petersburg;

From June 2010 the electric train of increased comfort No. 818/817 Kyiv – Vorozhba runs. Thanks to electric traction, the travel time of trains from Vorozhba to Kyiv was reduced by about half an hour.

Until 2013–2014, passenger trains ran through Vorozhba station in the following directions:

- Luhansk – Kyiv
- Moscow – Sumy
- Yevpatoria – Minsk
- St. Petersburg – Mariupol
- Bryansk – Kharkiv
- Kyiv – Voronezh

== Notes ==
- History of Vorozhba station
- Electrification of Konotop-Vorozhba line
- Arkhangelsky A.S., Arkhangelsky V.A. in two books. – M.: Transport, 1981. (rus.)
- Vorozhba station on Ukrainian Railway Encyclopedia
