= Dmytro Liubota =

Ukrainian politician

- Дмитро Любота
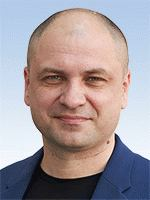
- Official portrait, 2019

People's Deputy of Ukraine
- Incumbent
- Assumed office 29 August 2019
- Preceded by: Viktor Ostapchuk
- Constituency: Kharkiv Oblast, No. 177

Personal details
- Born: 9 January 1981 (age 45) Kharkiv, Ukrainian SSR, Soviet Union (now Ukraine)
- Party: Servant of the People
- Other political affiliations: Independent (before 2019)
- Education: Kharkiv National University of Construction and Architecture

Dmytro Valeriyovych Liubota (Ukrainian: Дмитро Валерійович Любота; born 9 January 1981) is a Ukrainian politician currently serving as a People's Deputy of Ukraine representing Ukraine's 177th electoral district since 29 August 2019. He is a member of Servant of the People.

== Early life and career ==
Dmytro Valeriyovych Liubota was born on 9 January 1981 in the city of Kharkiv, then under the rule of the Soviet Union. In 2002, he graduated from the Kharkiv National University of Construction and Architecture, specialising in organisational management. He is a qualified economist-manager. Prior to his election, Liubota worked as manager of a building parts store in Kupiansk.

== Political career ==
Liubota ran in the 2019 Ukrainian parliamentary election as the candidate of Servant of the People for People's Deputy of Ukraine in Ukraine's 177th electoral district, which includes the cities of Izium and Kupiansk. At the time of the election, he was an independent. He was successfully elected to the Verkhovna Rada (parliament of Ukraine), defeating incumbent People's Deputy Viktor Ostapchuk with 40.26% of the vote to Ostapchuk's 26.97%.

In the Verkhovna Rada, Liubota joined the parliamentary faction of Servant of the People. He is a member of the Verkhovna Rada Committee on the integration of Ukraine with the European Union. In 2019 Liubota authored 24 draft laws, of which 4 became law.

Liubota officially joined the Servant of the People party on 10 November 2019.
