= Bilopillia railway station =

Railway station in Sumy Oblast, Ukraine

Bilopillia Білопілля
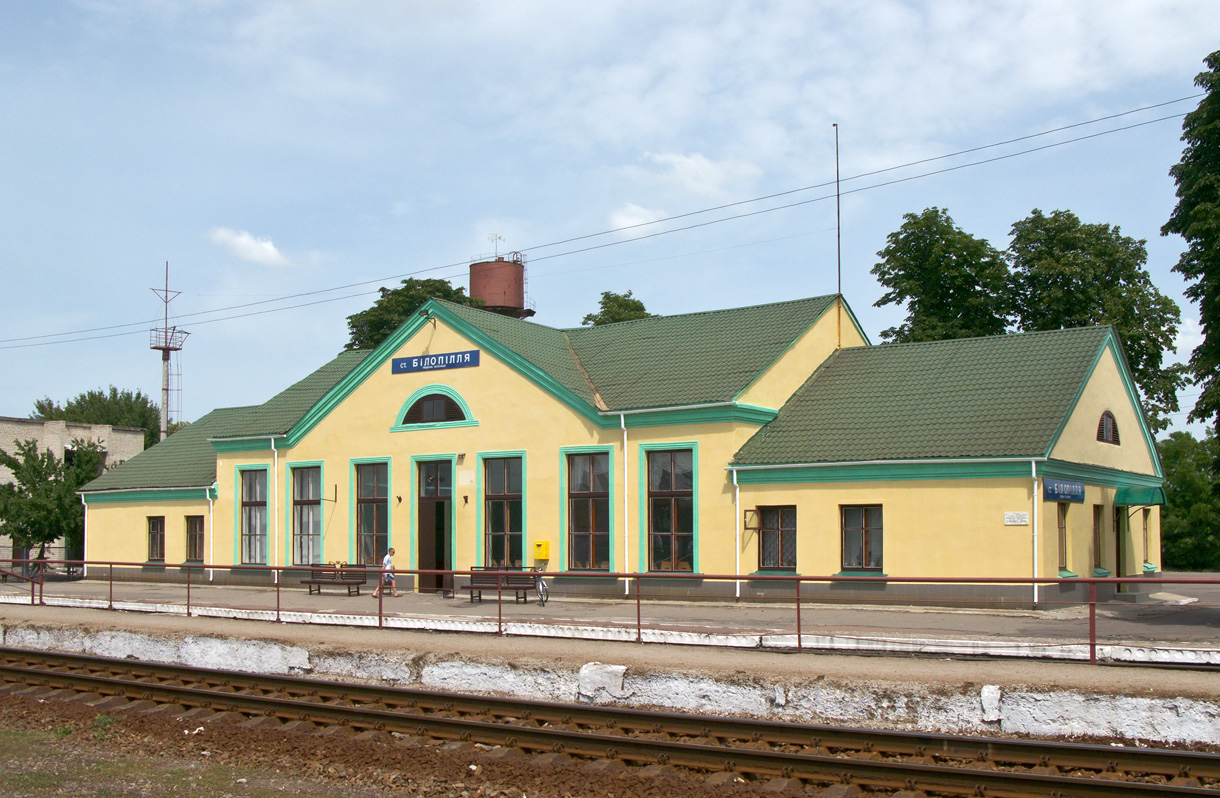

General information
- Coordinates: 51°08′31″N 34°16′17″E
- System: Southern Railways station
- Owner: Ukrzaliznytsia
- Lines: Bilopillia–Basy; Vorozhba–Bilopillia
- Platforms: 3
- Tracks: 8

Construction
- Parking: Yes

Other information
- Station code: 444708

History
- Opened: 1878

Services
Preceding station	Ukrzaliznytsia	Following station
Vorozhba	Southern Railways	Torokhtianyi
Location

Bilopillia (Ukrainian: Білопілля) is a railway station in Bilopillia, Ukraine. It is a major passenger station on the Bilopillia-Basy line of the Sumy Directorate of Southern Railways.

The station is located between Vorozhba (5 kilometres (3 mi) away) and Torokhtianyi (6 km (4 mi) away) in western Bilopillia on Vorozhbianskyi Shliakh.

== History ==
On May 13, 1873, a project for the construction of the Merefa-Vorozhba railway line was approved.

On January 8, 1878, passenger and freight traffic was opened in the direction of Sumy from Bilopillia station to Merefa station.

On January 22, 1878, the movement of trains was opened on the Vorozhba - Bilopillia line.

On February 8, 1878, trains were opened through the entire Sumy line from Merefa station to Vorozhba station.

== Passenger service ==
Passenger and suburban trains stop at Bilopillia station.

== Notes ==
- Tariff Guide No. 4. Book 1 (as of 05/15/2021) (Russian) Archived 05/15/2021.
- Arkhangelsky A.S., Arkhangelsky V.A. in two books. - M.: Transport, 1981. (rus.)
