= Virynskyi Zavod railway station =

Railway station in Mykolaivka, Ukraine

Virynskyi Zavod Віринський Завод

General information
- Coordinates: 50°57′14″N 34°22′30″E
- System: Southern Railways terminus
- Owner: Ukrzaliznytsia
- Line: Ambary–Virynskyi Zavod
- Platforms: 1
- Tracks: 3

Other information
- Station code: 445005

History
- Opened: 1912

Services
Preceding station	Ukrzaliznytsia	Following station
Terminus	Southern Railways	Ambary
Location

Virynskyi Zavod (Ukrainian: Віринський Завод) is a terminus railway station in Mykolaivka, Sumy Oblast, Ukraine. The station serves as a terminus for the Ambary-Virynskyi Zavod line as well as a freight train station. It is on the Sumy Directorate of Southern Railways on the Ambary-Virynskyi Zavod line.

Virynskyi Zavod is located 9 kilometres (6 mi) south of Ambary. Only suburban trains Trostianets-Smorodyne - Virynskyi Zavod and Sumy - Virynskyi Zavod run at the station.

== Notes ==
- Tariff Guide No. 4. Book 1 (as of 05/15/2021) (Russian) Archived 05/15/2021.
- Ukraine. Atlas of Railways. Mirilo 1: 750 000. - K .: DNVP "Cartography", 2008. - 80 p. - ISBN 978-966-475-082-7.
