= Shostka railway station =

Main railway station in the Ukrainian city of Shostka

Shostka Шостка
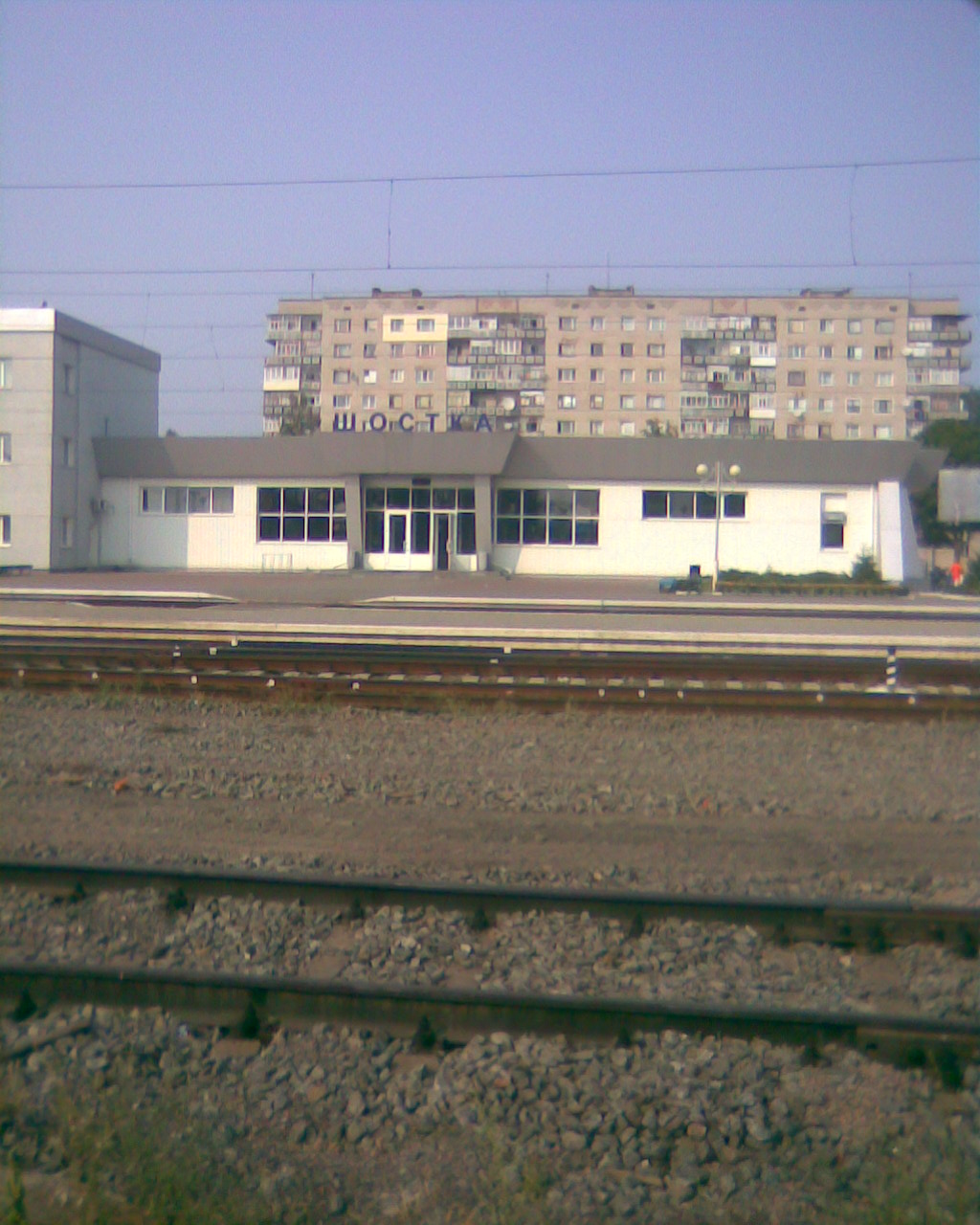
- Front view of the railway station

General information
- Location: Shostka, Sumy Oblast, Ukraine
- Coordinates: 51°51′31″N 33°28′52″E
- System: Southwestern Railways station
- Operator: Southwestern Railways
- Distance: 301 kilometres (187 mi) from Kyiv
- Platforms: 2

Other information
- Station code: 328206

History
- Opened: 1893
Location

The Shostka railway station (Ukrainian: Станція Шостка) is a railway station in the Ukrainian city of Shostka. It first opened in 1893, and is a part of Southwestern Railways.

== History ==
The station opened in 1893.

In 2004, the station underwent renovations. The section of rail between Shostka and Tereshchensk was also electrified that year.
