= Sumy Airport =

Sumy Airport Аеропорт "Суми"
- IATA: UMY; ICAO: UKHS

Summary
- Airport type: Public
- Operator: Civil Government
- Serves: Sumy
- Location: Sumy, Sumy Oblast, Ukraine
- Elevation AMSL: 594 ft (181 m)
- Coordinates: 50°51′30″N 34°45′45″E

Maps
- Location of Sumy Airport in Ukraine UKHS (Ukraine)
- Interactive map of Sumy Airport

Runways
Direction	Length		Surface
Direction	ft	m	Surface
08/26	8,202	2,500	Asphalt

Sumy Airport (IATA: UMY, ICAO: UKHS) is a state international airport located in Sumy, Ukraine. It has become international since 8 December 2006. The airport is capable of accepting such aircraft as the Tu-134 (with limitations), An-24, Yak-40, and aircraft of lower classes round-the-clock. The capacity of the airport terminal is 100 passengers per hour. As of August 2008, there are no flights scheduled from the capital Kyiv. The airport hosts car shows.

== See also ==
- List of airports in Ukraine
- List of the busiest airports in Ukraine
