= Vorozhba =

City in Sumy Oblast, Ukraine

Vorozhba Ворожба
- City
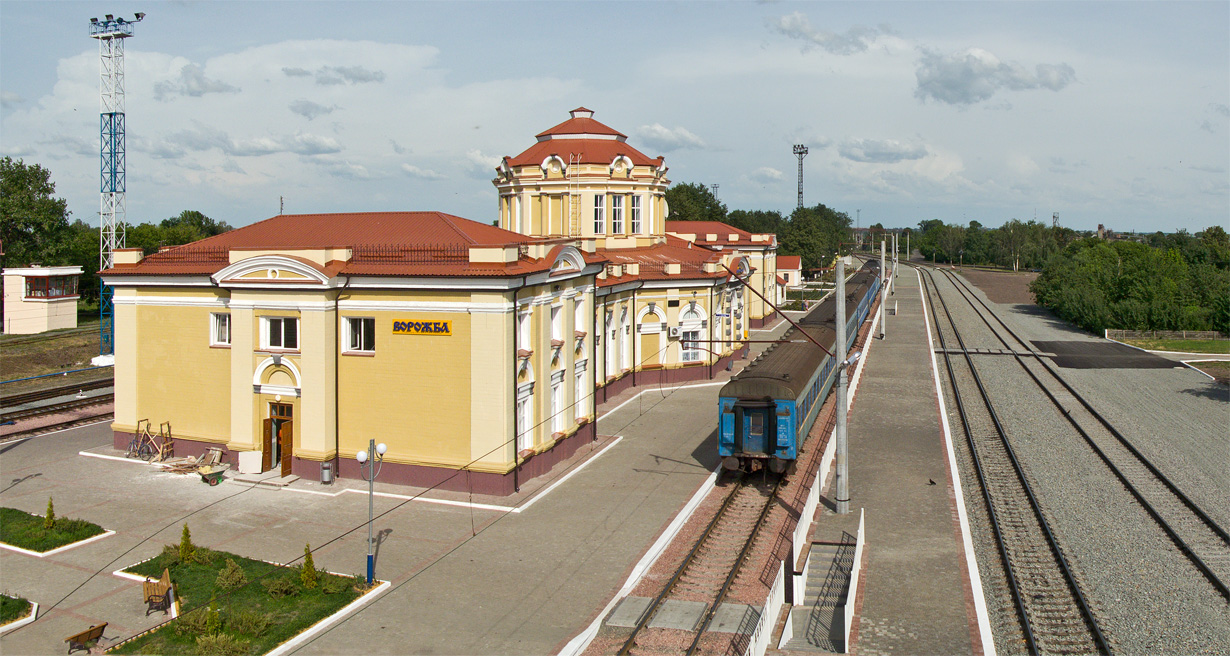
- Vorozhba railway station

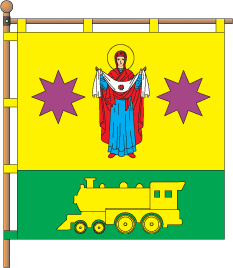
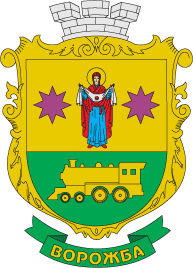
- Flag Coat of arms

- Location within Ukraine Location within Sumy Oblast
- Coordinates: 51°10′17″N 34°13′41″E
- Country: Ukraine
- Oblast: Sumy Oblast
- Raion: Sumy Raion
- Hromada: Vorozhba urban hromada

Population (2021)
  - Total: 6,674

Vorozhba (Ukrainian: Ворожба, pronounced [woroʒˈbɑ]) is a city in Sumy Raion, Sumy Oblast, in north-eastern Ukraine. Population: 6,674 (2022 estimate). In May 2025, the city's population remains at about 2,000.

== Geography ==
The city is located on the slopes of the Central Russian Upland, in the north of Sumy Raion. Vorozhba is located on the left bank of the VyrRiver, a tributary of the Seim River (Dnieper basin). Adjacent upstream is the town of Bilopillia, while 1.5 km downstream lies the village of Stari Vyrky. The river in this area is meandering, forming backwaters, meanders, and marshy lakes.

The climate is moderately continental. Winter is cool, summer is not hot. The average temperature in July is +19 °C, in January -7.5 °C. The maximum precipitation falls in the summer in the form of rain. The average annual amount is from 650 to 700 mm, changing from west to east.

There are several estuaries and old lakes on the Vyr river. Near Vorozhba there are forests, dominated by oaks, lindens and maples.. Typical large mammals are elk, roe deer, wild boar, squirrels, beavers, hares and wolves. The most common soils in the area are typical chernozem and gray soils.

Vorozhba hosts a significant railway junction known as Vorozhba railway station. The town is intersected by the T1908 highway.

== History ==
The city was first mentioned in historical sources in 1653. The name comes from the Vorozhba River, which flowed near the settlement. In the 17th century, it was part of the military settlement of the Sumy Regiment. In 1869, a railway was laid through the settlement, which turned it into a powerful railway junction. Located on the Kyiv - Konotop - Kursk line, Vorozhba housed railway repair workshops.

In 1917-1918 Vorozhba served as a gathering place of Bolshevik troops during their campaigns against the Ukrainian People's Republic. During the German occupation in World War II, in 1943, the Germans operated a subcamp of the Dulag 102 prisoner-of-war camp in the town.
