= Southern Railways (Ukraine) =

State-owned railway company in Ukraine

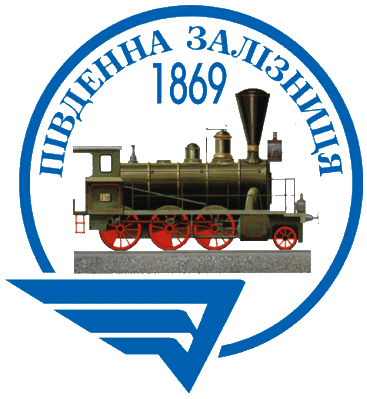

Overview
- Headquarters: Kharkiv
- Locale: Ukraine
- Dates of operation: 1869 (157 years ago)–

Technical
- Length: 3,000 km (1,900 mi)

Other
- Website: uz.gov.ua

The Southern Railways (SR) (Ukrainian: Південна залізниця; Russian: Южная железная дорога) is a composing part of Ukraine's Ukrzaliznytsia railroad company and is headquartered in Kharkiv. Southern Railways's route map covers all railroads of the Kharkiv, Poltava and some railroads in other oblasts (regions) as well.

As of 2008, the Southern Railways operate 3,000 kilometres (1,864 mi) of track. The Southern Railways company contributes a large role as a transit railway in the routes of Russia-Crimea and Russia-Caucasus.

== History ==
=== In the Russian Empire ===
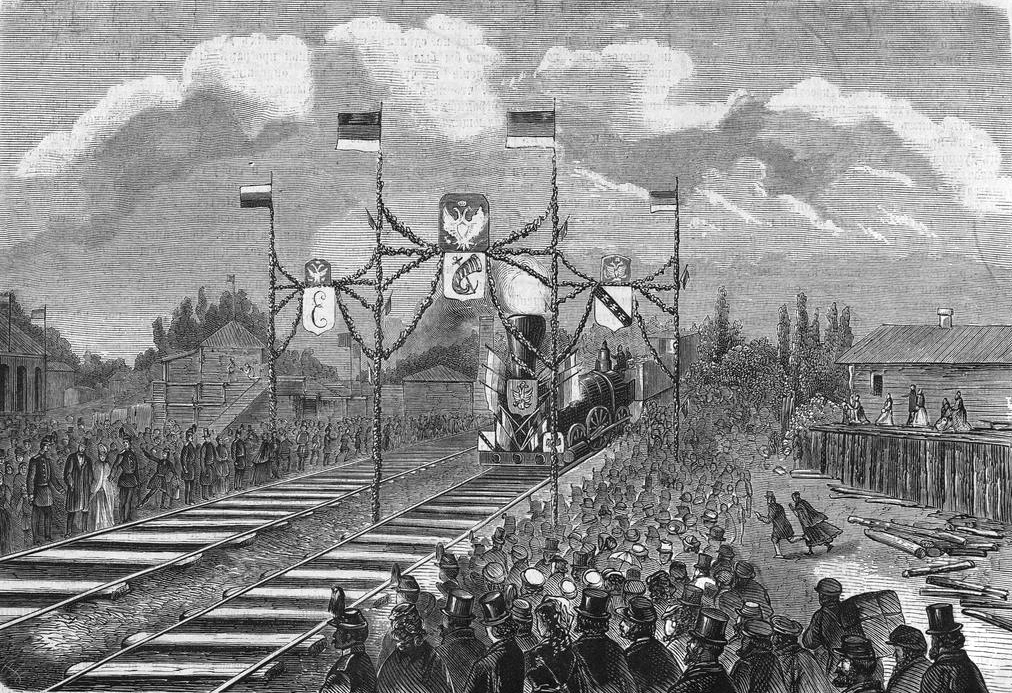
An illustration of the opening of the Kursk-Kharkiv-Azov railway line in 1869.

The railway was formed on 6 July 1869, when train traffic began on the newly established Kursk-Kharkiv-Azov railway line, which is often considered the starting date of the company. The railway line was built starting in May 1868 under a concession granted to businessman Samuel Polyakov in order to connect central Russia with southern Ukraine and the Sea of Azov, facilitating coal transport from the Donbas, supporting grain exports, and integrating Kharkiv into the rail network. By late 1869, the line from Kharkiv to Rostov had also become operational. In 1875, the railway expanded its administrative structure by adding track assembly and repair control services.

After the opening of the Kursk-Kharkiv line, the second line was added in 1875 connected Lozova to Sevastopol, which connected the Taurida Governorate to other cities in the central provinces of the Russian Empire. Until 1 February 1891, the railway operated by a private joint-stock company, but it was transferred to the state treasury of the Russian Empire on that date in accordance with the Regulation of the Committee of Ministers that was approved in December 1890. A few years later, on 1 November 1894, a unified network of the Lozova-Sevastopol, Kursk-Kharkiv-Azov, and Dzhankoi–Feodosia Railways were merged to create Kursk-Kharkiv-Sevastopol Railways (К-Х-С), the precursor to the formal Southern Railways. In 1896, the Kostiantynivka–Rostov and Kostiantynivka–Yasynuvata sections were transferred over to Katerynynska Railway, and other sections were leased to the Society of the South‑Eastern Railways (now South Eastern Railway (Russia)). During the Russian Revolution of 1905, the plants for the railway became one of the first in labor rights movement, particularly the Kharkiv Locomotive Plant, which signed one of the first collective agreements on 1 February 1905.

This regional railways was formed on 1 January 1907 soon after a merge of the Kursk-Kharkiv-Sevastopol railways and the Kharkiv-Mykolaiv railways. Before World War I, the railway underwent extensive modernization, including switches being implemented, construction of the Syvash railway bridge and the Kamyshovyi viaduct began, and electric lightning started to be implemented in passenger cars.

==== Role in World War I ====
After the start of World War I, the director became B. Voskresenskiy, who managed to significantly improve the operational efficiency of Southern Railway by introducing the "compression method" to increase rolling stock efficieincy. This reduced locomotive idle time by more than half and increased wagon turnover by 55%, and the shunting locomotive fleet was optimized. However, the railway faced wartime fuel shortages, with most coal failing to meet quality standards and new regulations forced Southern Railways to reduce coal content in locomotive fuel to 41%. It also played a major role in transporting large numbers of refugees and evacuated factories to cities in the Black Sea.

=== Russian Civil War ===
During the Russian Civil War, massive destruction occurred to Southern Railways, any thousands of kilometers of tracks degraded into dirt roads and many lines were dismantled. In 1918, the railway was briefly captured by the Ukrainian People's Republic (UPR) from the Bolsheviks, who had seized Kharkiv, and in May 1918 it was renamed to Слобідська (Sloboda), in reference to Sloboda Ukraine. After fighting between the Bolsheviks, the White Movement, and the UPR, by 1920 Southern Railways transported 3 times less oil and grain and 5,000 times less ore, although coal shipments only decreased a minor amount. By early April 1920, personnel of the railway had resorted to intercepting army firewood cards and dismantling railway fences and wooden structures to use as fuel. Initially, the railway stations in Crimea were under the new railway administration of the Department of Communications after they were seized by Pyotr Wrangel's Armed Forces of South Russia during the civil war, but a few days later this was abolished and it came under the control of the Chief of Military Communications. A decision was soon after made for Southern Railways to oversee the construction of a new line, the Dzhankoi-Perekop railway station, in order to defend Crimea against the Bolsheviks. By late November 1920, however, all the territory of Southern Railways came under Bolshevik control with the Evacuation of the Crimea by Wrangel's forces.

=== Soviet era ===
==== New Economic Policy and Five Year Plan ====
During the early Soviet period of the railway, from 1920 to 1923, coal production in the Donbas for Southern Railways has collapsed. Trains ended up being stranded for days, and power shifted from the People's Commissariat under A. Ivanov to a decentralized "Southern District" in order to manage the crisis of the railway. During the era of the New Economic Policy under Vladimir Lenin, starting in 1922 the railway started to slowly move towards self-sufficiency after its collapse during the Civil War. The railway transitioned into Khozraschet raschet, cost accounting, introduced cargo insurance, and became legally responsible for delivery times. To help the local population after the war, it was approved that discounts were given to students, refugees, and families and personnel of the Red Army. By 1926, the railway had become almost fully restored to its pre-war output, ranking 2nd in the entire USSR for railways based on freight volume and income.

During 1930, the Kharkiv Operational and Traction Institute of Railway Transport (now the Ukrainian State University of Railway Transport) was formed, which maintained a heavy cooperation with Southern Railways in providing workers and technical cooperation. Upon the start of the Five-year plans by the Soviet authorities, the railway was reorganized in order to meet technical demands. On 1 February 1934, as a result of the Resolution of the Council of People’s Commissars of the USSR No. 2679 of 13.12.1933 and NKPS Order No. 499Ц of 17.12.1933 during a period of disaggregation of many railways in the USSR, the railway was split: one half was Donetsk Railway (Донецкая ж.д.), which had its center in Stalino (now Donetsk), and the remaining became simply Southern Railway. The railway also separated "wagon services" into its own department, upgraded to heavy rails, and implemented automatic braking for all freight trains. Under drives like Pyotr Krivonos in the Sloviansk depot, a movement called the "Stakhanovite-Krivonos" movement was implemented where crews competed to deliver cargo faster. Major reconstruction was also done on the Osnova station in Kharkiv, alongside the Moscow-Donbas line, in order to increase income.

==== World War II ====
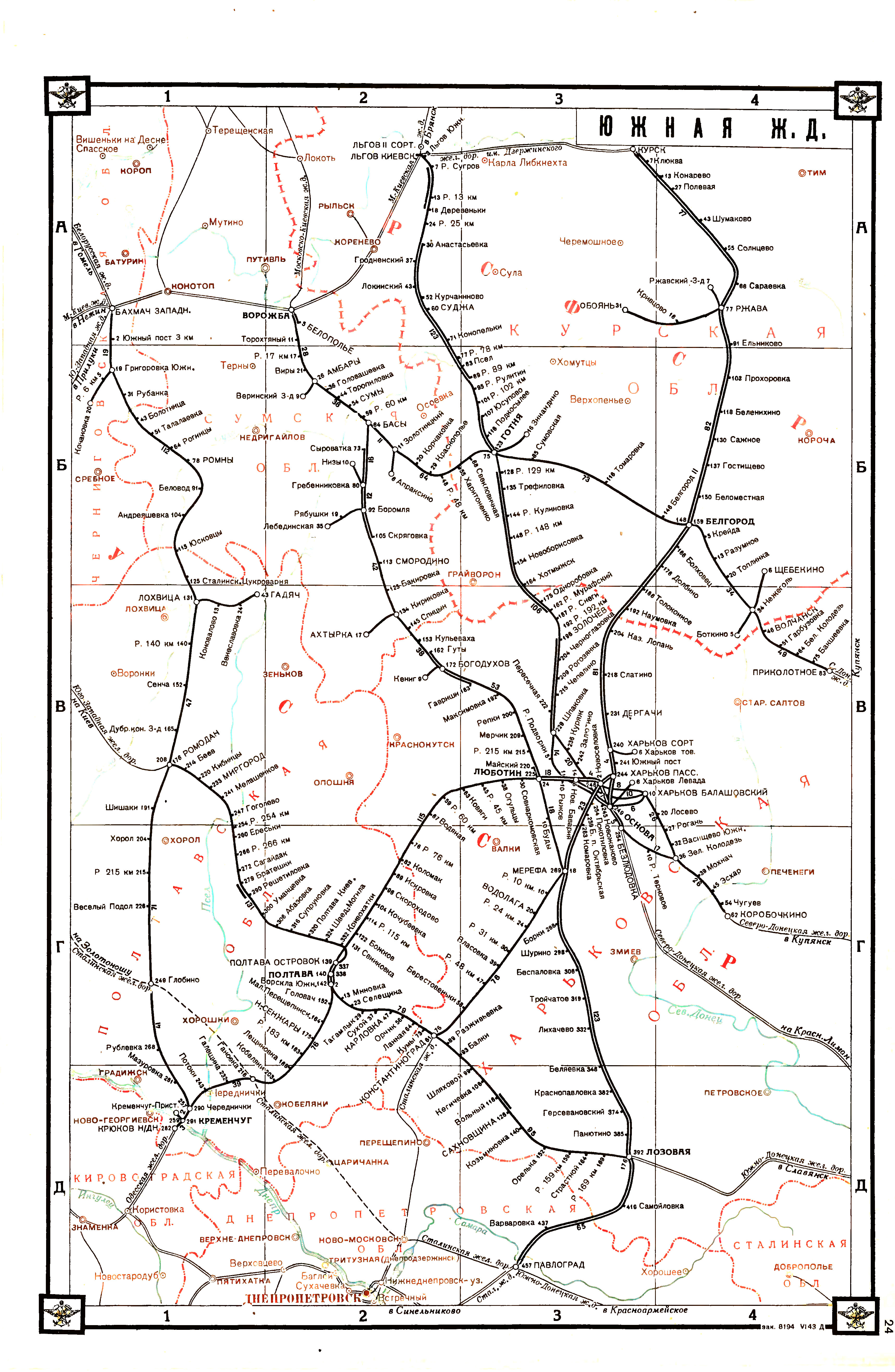
A map of the Southern Railways lines during 1943.

During World War II, also called the "Great Patriotic War" in Soviet historiography, the frontline first came to Southern Railways in 1941, during which time military shipments spiked to almost 40% of all traffic of the railway. Personnel of the railway adopted a scorched earth policy under specialized units of the railway, destroying over 1,000 bridges and planting 1,300 delayed-action mines in the Kharkiv hub for Southern Railways to delay the German forces. Major General P. Zasorin was put in charge of the military transport administration for the Southern Railway, and was responsible for evacuating the railway's property and industrial enterprises. After the Soviet success in the Battle of Kursk, the Military Transport Directorate of the Southern Railway was re-created there until Kharkiv was eventually recaptured as well in later 1943, when in September Zasorin and the administration of Southern Railway returned to Kharkiv to resume operations on the restored sections of the lines.

Throughout the war, officers and railway workers introduced new organizational methods, such as "vertushka", or fixed-fuel carousels, and bumper-to-bumper train movement allowed for troops redeployments, and 894 full military trains were transported to the frontlines following the Battle of Stalingrad. For its wartime contributions, the railway received the transitional Red Banner of the State Defense Committee for permanent safekeeping.

==== Post World War II ====
Due to the war, the railway had suffered extensive destruction, with up to 80% of tracks being out of operation, 75% of bridges being destroyed, and locomotives and wagon depots were completely ruined. In order to restore the railway, in 1944 RSP-11 was introduced, which was a modest mobile unit with a few freight cars tasked with the repair of war-damaged tracks. By 1947, major restoration began on the main track of the railway, that of Moscow-Kursk-Kharkiv. Just a year later, in 1948, Southern Railway officially exceeded its pre-war freight turnover levels. This was, in part, due to a combination of drivers at the Kharkiv-Sortirovochny depot began using "izgar" or fuel waste in order to fire locomotives and because of the "Five-Hunderder" movement within the railways employees, in which locomotive drivers were encouraged to achieve daily runs of 500 km+. For the 1949-1950 year the railway won first place in the USSR for fuel economy by saving 300,000 tons of fuel.

In 1957, the first Electric locomotive was implemented on the line going from Kharkiv to Merefa. This started a trend of electrifying freight trains, first with the Kharkiv-Belgorod route at the "Oktyabr" Depot, and so for this purpose the "Kharkiv" Motor-Vagon Depot was split off from the "Oktyabr" Depot to specifically handle the new electric commuter trains, which were ER2 in line with the rest of the USSR. By 1963, the very last steam locomotive underwent a lifting repair in Poltava. In 1966, Southern Railways introduced its first continuous-welded rail technology by producing its first experimental long rail at the newly built welding facility in Kremenchuk using the MSGR-500 and RSP-11 machines. In the 1970s, there was a push for Dieselisation of passenger routes, and all the old Russian locomotive class SU steam engines were finally replaced by the TE10 series, which were manufactured locally by Malyshev Factory. In recognition of this push, in 1969 the railway was awarded the Order of Lenin.

=== In an independent Ukraine ===
In December 2014, during the War in Donbas, the Ukrainian government ordered that certain structural subdivisions and property of Donets Railway be transferred temporarily to Southern Railway, with other parts also going to Prydnipro Railways.

In March 2024, railway stations of Southern Railways were being renamed to comply with derussification and decommunization laws. In February 2025, the Commission of the Ukrainian Institute of National Memory Noted that "Southwestern" and "Southern Railways" names are propaganda for Russian imperial policy and violate the law.

== Structure ==
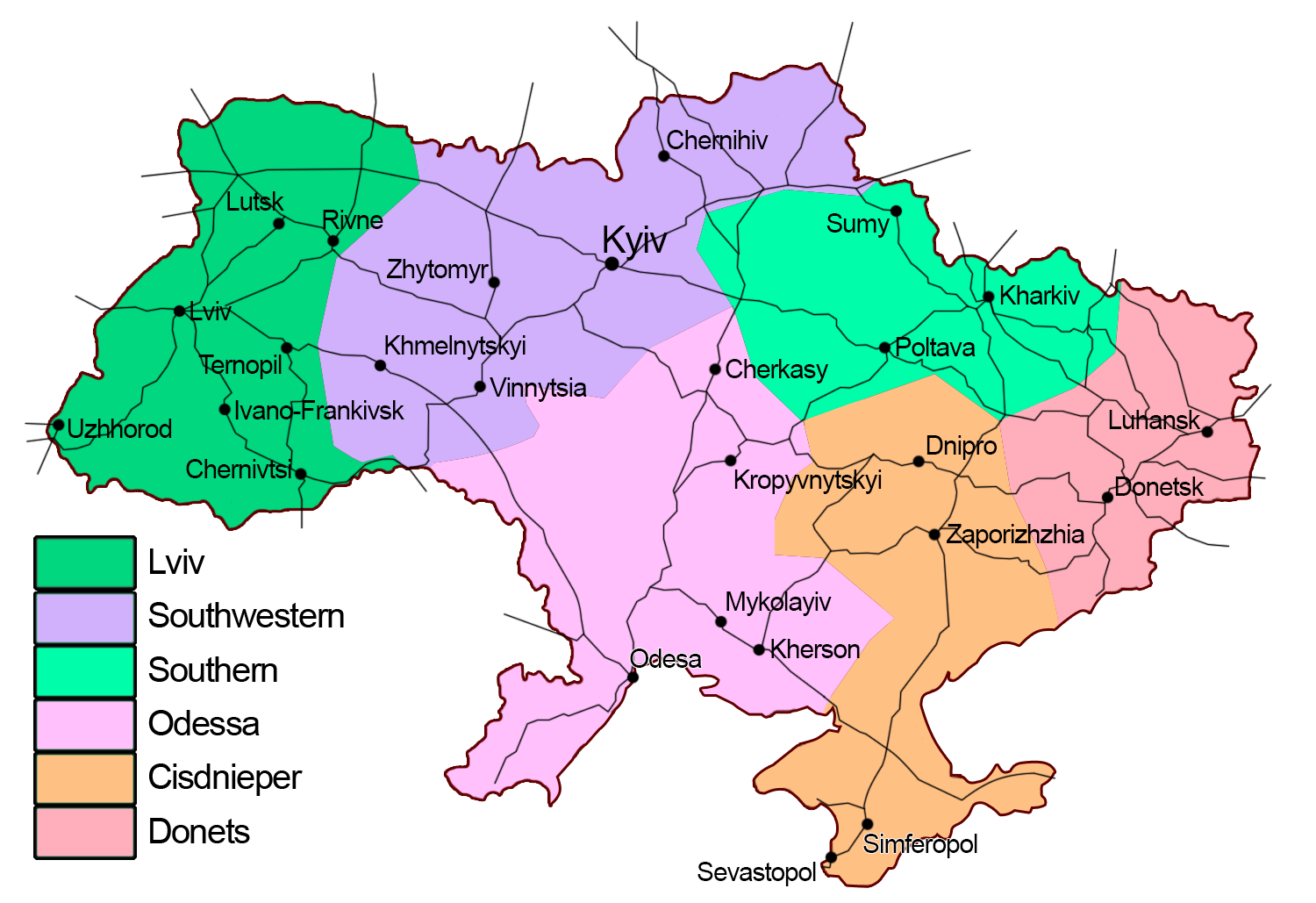
Subdivisions of Ukrainian Railways

Subdivisions

- Sumy
- Kharkiv
- Poltava
- Kupiansk

Others

- Central House of Science and Technology (Kharkiv subdivision)
- Mykola Hohol Sanatorium

== Directors ==
=== Southern Railways ===
- 1907–1907 Johann-Theodore "Fyodor" Schmidt
- 1907–1908 Viktor Rozanov
- 1909–1910 Ippolit Ivanovskiy
- 1910–1913 Vladislav Stulginskiy
- 1913–1916 Boris Voskresenskiy
- 1916–1917 Boris Yazykov
- 1920–1920 Aleksei Ivanov (commissar)
- 1920–1921 A.Hlavatskyi
- 1921–1922 V.Nauman
- 1923–1926 A. Ivanov
- 1920s I. Myronov
- 1927–1928 Viktor Paniashvili
- 1928–1930 P. Bandura
- 1931–1933 Yakiv Livshyts
- 1933–1934 Mykola Levchenko
- 1934–1934 Oleksiy Zorin

=== Southern Railway ===
- 1934–1937 Petro Shushkov
- 1937–1938 Ilarion Maliy
- 1938–1944 Semen Kutafin
- 1944–1945 Kostiantyn Danylenko
- 1945–1954 Petro Dmytryuk
- 1954–1959 Kostiantyn Kozhukhar
- 1959–1972 Hryhoriy Holovchenko
- 1972–1976 Mykola Konaryev
- 1976–1983 Oleksiy Shutov
- 1983–1995 Oleksandr Puchko
- 1995–1997 Oleh Kryuchkov
- 1997–2000 Vasyl Nesvit
- 2000–2005 Viktor Ostapchuk
- 2005–2005 Hryhoriy Boiko
- 2005–2012 Viktor Ostapchuk
- 2012–2014 Oleksandr Filatov
- 2014– Mykola Umanets
