= GT1 locomotive =

Russian freight gas-turbine locomotive

GT1
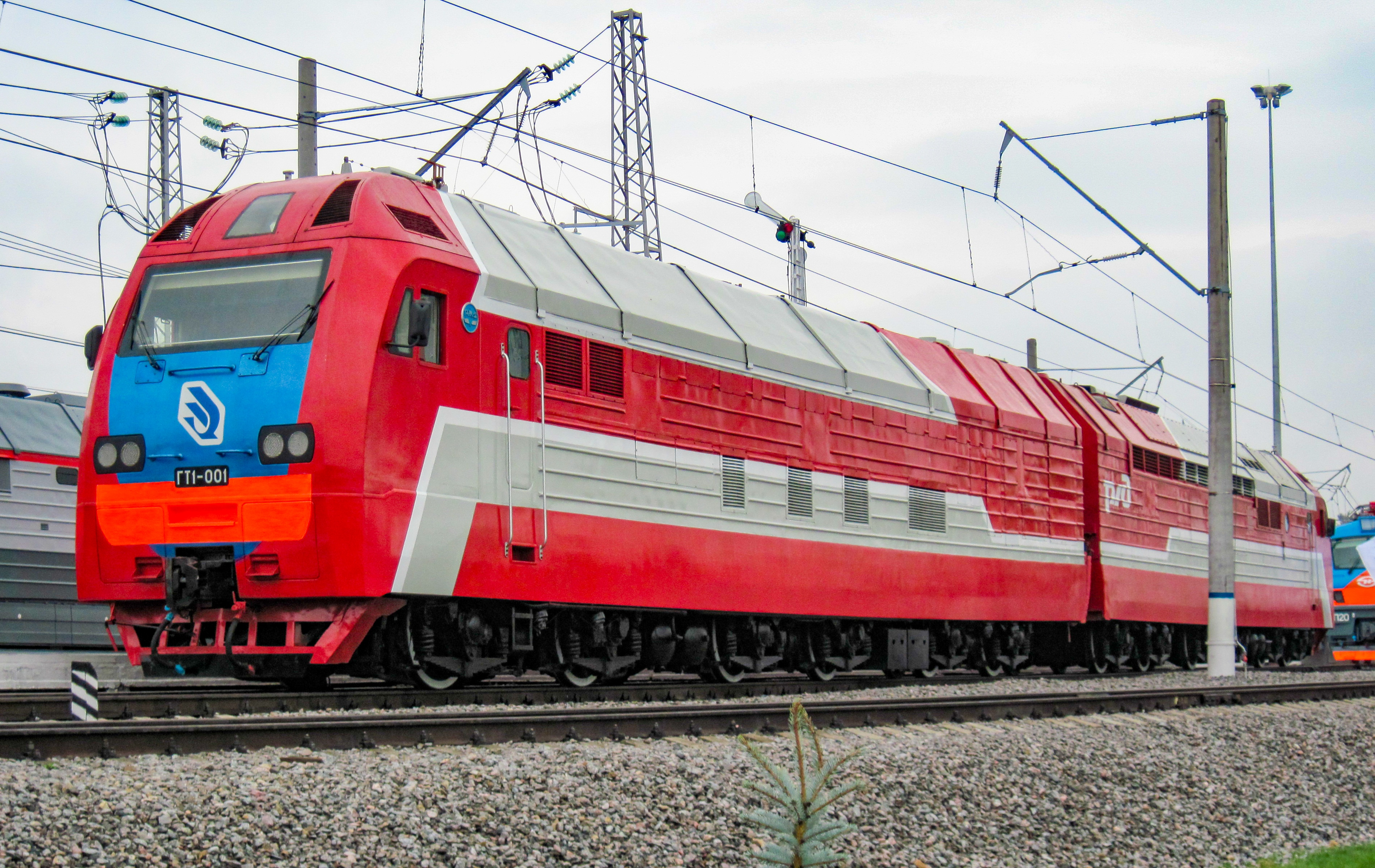
- GT1-001 at the PRO//Dvizhenie.Expo exhibition in Shcherbinka in 2011
Type and origin
- Power type: Gas-turbine–electric
- Builder: Zheldorremmash at Voronezh Locomotive Plant (001); Sinara Group at Lyudinovsky Locomotive Plant (002)
- Build date: 2007, 2013
- Total produced: 2 (one based on VL15 with ES4K/ES5K cabs, the other based on TEM7A, TEM14, TE8 with 2ES6 body)
Specifications
- Configuration
  - UIC: Bo'Bo'Bo'+Bo'Bo'Bo' (001) (Bo'Bo')(Bo'Bo')+(Bo'Bo')(Bo'Bo') (002)
- Gauge: 1,520 mm (4 ft 11 27/32 in)
- Wheel diameter: 1,250 mm (4 ft 1 in) (001); 1,050 mm (3 ft 5 in) (002)
- Wheelbase: 16,430 mm (53 ft 11 in) (001); 17,200 mm (56 ft 5 in) (002)
  - Bogie: 2,900 mm (9 ft 6 in) (001); 6,300 mm (20 ft 8 in) (002)
- Length: 45,060 mm (147 ft 10 in) (001); 43,000 mm (141 ft 1 in) (002)
- Width: 3,240 mm (10 ft 8 in) (001); 3,150 mm (10 ft 4 in) (002)
- Height: 5,250 mm (17 ft 3 in) (001)
- Axle load: 25 t (55,000 lb) (001); 23 t (51,000 lb) (002)
- Service weight: 300 t (660,000 lb) (001); 368 t (811,000 lb) (002)
- Fuel type: Liquefied methane
- Fuel capacity: 17 t (37,000 lb) (001); 20 t (44,000 lb) (002)
- Prime mover: NK-361
- Traction motors: Collector types: TL-3B (001), ED-133A (002)
  - Continuous: 12×560 kW (751 hp) (001); 12×415.6 kW (557 hp) (002)
- Transmission: AC-DC Electric
- Couplers: SA3 coupler
Performance figures
- Maximum speed: 100 km/h (62 mph)
- Power output
  - 1 hour: 8,300 kW (11,100 hp) (001); 8,500 kW (11,400 hp) (002)
- Tractive effort
  - 1 hour: 775 kN (174,226.93 lbf) (002)
  - Continuous: 620 kN (139,381.54 lbf) (001); 775 kN (174,226.93 lbf) (002)
Career
- Operators: Russian Railways
- Locale: Sverdlovsk Railway in Russia
- Disposition: In service

GT1 (Russian: ГТ1, later GT1h — gazoturbovoz, type 1, hybrid) is a class of Russian mainline dual-unit freight gas-turbine–electric locomotives, manufactured in Russia by Zheldorremmash at Voronezh Locomotive Plant and by Sinara Group at Lyudinovsky Locomotive Plant. The locomotive uses an AC/DC electric transmission: the gas turbine engine running on liquefied natural gas is connected to an alternating current generator, and the current produced by it is rectified to direct current and supplied to the traction electric motors, which drive the locomotive. A unique feature of the locomotive's design is the placement of a single gas turbine unit on only one of its units, while the fuel compartment is on the other unit, with both units being the traction units. GT1 is the most powerful gas-turbine locomotive in the world.

A total of two fundamentally different design variants of this series were built, each of which produced a single locomotive. The first locomotive was modernized in 2007 at the Voronezh Locomotive Repair Plant from a VL15 electric locomotive with six-axle units, and the second was built at the Lyudinovo Locomotive Building Plant based on a running gear similar to the eight-axle TEM7 and TE8 locomotives and a body partially standardized in design with the TE8 locomotive and the 2ES6 electric locomotive. After undergoing testing, both locomotives were assigned to the Yegorshino depot on the Sverdlovsk Railway and haul freight trains on the Yegorshino–Serov section.

== History ==
=== Background ===
From the 1940s to the 1970s, the work was actively carried out in several countries around the world to develop gas-turbine locomotives as an alternative to diesel locomotives. In the late 1950s, in the Soviet Union, several models of gas turbine locomotives were developed and experimental units were built: one unit of the dual-unit freight G1 and GT101, and two single-unit passenger GP1 locomotives. However, the experimental service of these locomotives showed that in terms of fuel consumption, they exceeded diesel locomotives of similar power by more than two times. The efficiency of gas-turbine engines produced at that time was low (about 15%), as a result of which the cost of the fuel they consumed was comparable to that of diesel locomotives, but the fuel supply was used up more quickly. At the same time, gas turbines were significantly more expensive to produce than diesel engines, and due to the use of low-quality fuel, they quickly became contaminated and required frequent maintenance. By this time, the production of sufficiently powerful diesel engines had already been mastered, so gas-turbine ships were no longer produced in the USSR and work on their development was discontinued.

In the 21st century, the cost of producing gas turbine engines has decreased due to their large-scale serial production for jet aircraft, gas pumping units, and gas-fired power plants. At the same time, their efficiency has increased thanks to design improvements and the use of more heat-resistant materials, which allow for higher gas combustion temperatures, thereby increasing the engine's efficiency to 30%. This has increased interest in using such engines in rail transport due to their higher specific power compared to internal combustion piston engines, the possibility of using cheaper low-grade fuel, an extended service life due to fewer moving parts, and significantly reduced carbon deposits.

One of the reasons that increased interest in the development of gas turbine locomotives in Russia was the increase in freight traffic on Russian railways, which led to the need to increase either the length and weight or the number of freight trains, as well as their speeds. To operate trains with increased weight, it was necessary either to use a larger number of locomotive units in the consist or to develop locomotives with more powerful power units. However, the possibility of developing powerful diesel locomotives was greatly limited compared to electric locomotives due to the need to accommodate a primary power unit with a larger and heavier cooling system and a fuel tank. This led to the need to reconfigure heavy freight trains at the junctions of electrified and non-electrified railway sections, increasing their downtime at stations, or to use several diesel locomotives in a single train, which required an increase in the locomotive fleet and operational costs for their maintenance and repair. The use of a gas turbine instead of a diesel engine made it possible to create an autonomous locomotive, similar in weight to standard diesel locomotives, but significantly superior in power, comparable to that of mainline electric locomotives.

Another reason was the problem of the depletion of global oil reserves and the increase in diesel fuel prices, which led to higher costs for freight transport on non-electrified railway lines, as well as the problem of environmental pollution from combustion products of liquid hydrocarbons. In this regard, the issue of developing locomotives using cheaper and environmentally friendly types of fuel began to be considered at JSC "Russian Railways". In the energy strategy of Russian Railways, it was decided to gradually convert part of the locomotive fleet to natural gas (methane), which is available in large quantities in Russian deposits. The main drawback of this type of fuel is its low density, and in order to store a sufficient amount of gas on board a locomotive, it is necessary either to compress it to a very high pressure (up to 200 atmospheres), which requires the use of heavy thick-walled tanks and is therefore unsuitable for mainline locomotives, or to liquefy it by cooling it to a temperature below −161 °C (−258 °F), which allows reducing the gas volume by approximately 600 times. At the same time, the production cost of even liquefied natural gas (LNG) is almost half that of diesel fuel, which allows reducing operating costs.

However, the liquefied natural gas (LNG) occupies twice the volume of diesel fuel of the same mass and requires a specially insulated cryogenic tank for its storage, which must be more than twice the volume of standard fuel tanks to store a sufficient amount of fuel on board the locomotive. Due to its large volume, the LNG fuel tank cannot be located in the same unit of the mainline locomotive as the power units and requires an additional tender unit. In order to accommodate traction electric motors in this unit for a more efficient use of the locomotive's adhesive weight, the primary power unit in the other unit must provide high power, which can be achieved by using a gas turbine instead of a gas piston or gas diesel engine. Moreover, the use of a gas engine, and particularly a gas turbine, allows for a reduction in the amount of harmful emissions into the atmosphere compared to a diesel engine.

In this regard, the management of Russian Railways deemed it appropriate to develop a mainline gas turbine locomotive capable of hauling trains of the same mass as standard mainline electric locomotives and operating on liquefied natural gas.

=== First locomotive ===
In the beginning of 2005, commissioned by the Russian Railways, the All-Russian Scientific Research and Design-Technological Institute (VNIKTI) in Kolomna began the development of the GT1 mainline dual-unit freight gas-turbine locomotive with electric transmission, having a nominal gas turbine engine power of 8,300 kW (11,100 hp) and using liquefied natural gas (LNG) as fuel, which is regasified before being supplied to the gas turbine. To accommodate the cryogenic tank with LNG, a significant volume was required; therefore, it was decided to place it and the power unit in different units, which simplified their maintenance. Such an arrangement was previously used on experiental Soviet diesel locomotives 2TE10G and 2TE116G, between the main units of which a tender unit with a cryogenic tank without traction motors was coupled, as well as on American gas-turbine freight locomotives, to which a tender unit in the form of a fuel oil tank was attached at the rear. The difference of the new gas-turbine locomotive from the experimental locomotives was that its traction motors were also placed on the tender unit with fuel capacity, as a result of which it became a booster unit. In addition, an auxiliary diesel generator, used to start the gas turbine and to move the locomotive without load for fuel-saving purposes, was supposed to be placed on this unit.

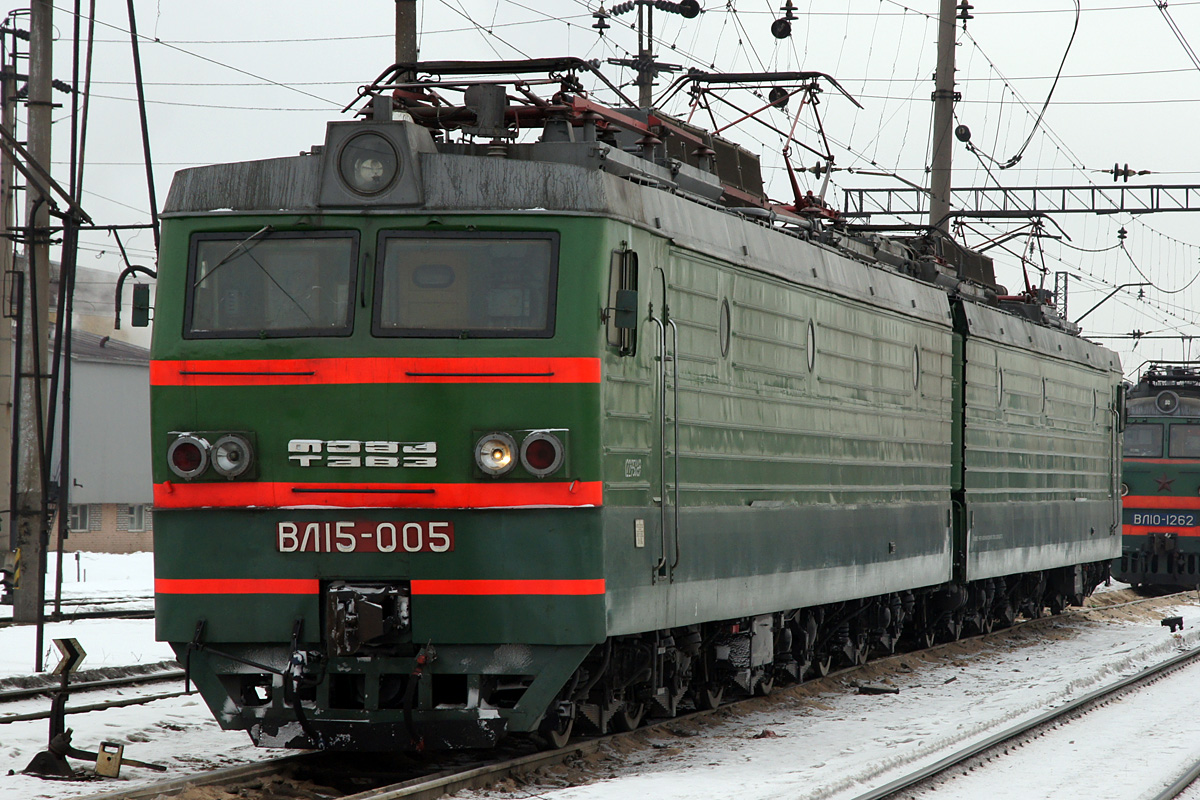
VL15 electric locomotive, similar to the modernized gas-turbine locomotive GT1-001

In order to accelerate the process of developing a new gas-turbine locomotive, it was decided to use the body and crew compartment of an existing locomotive. For the latter, a dual-unit twelve-axle VL15 series freight electric locomotive was chosen, which had sufficient unit length to accommodate a gas-turbine power plant and the appropriate total traction motor power. These electric locomotives were produced in the second half of the 1980s by the Tbilisi Electric Locomotive Plant, while their body and bogies were manufactured by the Novocherkassk Electric Locomotive Plant. In January 2005, the Chelyabinsk Electric Locomotive Plant began preparations for the modernization of electric locomotive VL15-008, which was built in 1987 and previously operated on the October Railway, dismantling all main electrical equipment from the body and the roof. In June of the same year, the disassembled locomotive was sent for further conversion into a gas-turbine locomotive at the Voronezh Locomotive Plant.

At the same time, in March 2005, the work began on selecting components for the future gas turbine locomotive. A total of 54 industrial companies were involved in the development of the gas turbine locomotive and its equipment, 90% of which were companies from Russia. VNIKTI became the lead developer of the project and technical documentation for the locomotive and coordinated the work on its assembly and component manufacturing, as well as created the microprocessor control system and software. The modernization of the locomotive, installation of equipment, and production of a number of new mechanical components were carried out by the Voronezh Locomotive Repair Plant. The gas turbine engine was manufactured by the Samara Scientific and Technical Complex named after N. D. Kuznetsov, the traction and auxiliary generators — by LLC “Elektrotyazhmash-Privod” (Lysva), the cryogenic tank — by JSC “Uralkriomash” (Nizhny Tagil), and the new control cab — by NPP “Polyot” (Obninsk). During the development of the gas turbine locomotive, the companies conducted a complex range of scientific research and experimental design works to create a methane-fueled gas turbine and a high-speed traction generator driven by it without a gearbox, a fuel supply and gasification system with minimal preparation time, a microprocessor control and diagnostic system, as well as the equipment layout.

Since the calculated output power of the gas-turbine locomotive's traction motors was lower than that of the original electric locomotive, an attempt was made to replace the locomotive TL-3B's original traction electric motors with the lighter and less powerful NB-420B electric motors from VL82 electric locomotives. However, spare motors were not available, and it was decided to dismantle them from two VL82 electric locomotives that were in relatively good technical condition. During the re-equipment process, it turned out that these motors were unsuitable, and ultimately the gas-turbine locomotive retained its original type of motors. Meanwhile, the VL82 electric locomotives used as temporary donor sources for the motors were, for an unknown reason, decided to be sent for scrap.

When selecting a gas turbine, specialists from VNIKTI studied several models of gas turbine engines produced by Russian companies, including FSUE "Salute", JSC "Aviamotorny Scientific and Technical Complex "Soyuz"" (Moscow), JSC "Aviadvigatel" (Perm), and JSC "Samara Scientific and Technical Complex named after N. D. Kuznetsov" (Samara). The choice was made in favor of the Samara company, which had experience in developing, in the late 1980s and early 1990s, an aircraft turbojet engine that operated on liquefied hydrogen and liquefied methane. A design feature of the engine was the gasification of cooled liquid fuel through heating by hot exhaust gases in the turbine exhaust pipe without the use of intermediate heat carriers, which increased the efficiency of the fuel gas preparation process. Experimental engines were used on the prototype passenger aircraft Tu-155 (an analogue of the serial Tu-154 with kerosene engines), but proved to be unclaimed in aviation. However, the experience gained proved useful in the development of a gas turbine engine for a locomotive.

The main work on the development of the NK-361 gas turbine engine for a locomotive based on serially produced aircraft engines was carried out by specialists at the Kuznetsov SNTK in 2005. In the beginning of 2006, tests of the gas generator began, followed shortly by tests of the entire gas turbine engine. During the turbine manufacturing process, its individual components were tested, including the combustion chamber during startup on cold gas. Shortly thereafter, the company Elektrotjazhmash-Privod manufactured a high-speed traction generator for this turbine, which after factory testing, was delivered to the Samara plant in the summer of the same year. Final stand idle resistance tests of the gas turbine and generator were conducted in December 2006. During the tests, 73 engine startups were conducted, during which the operation of the fuel system from the cryogenic tank to the gas turbine was checked, as well as the operation of the oil systems of the gas turbine and generators, debugging of the gas turbine engine cold start with an output to nominal rotational speed, determination of the main parameters of the engine, traction and auxiliary generators under different load conditions from idle to maximum, and assessment of engine vibrations. The tests confirmed the expected characteristics of the engine; however, the system for regulating operating modes required refinement.

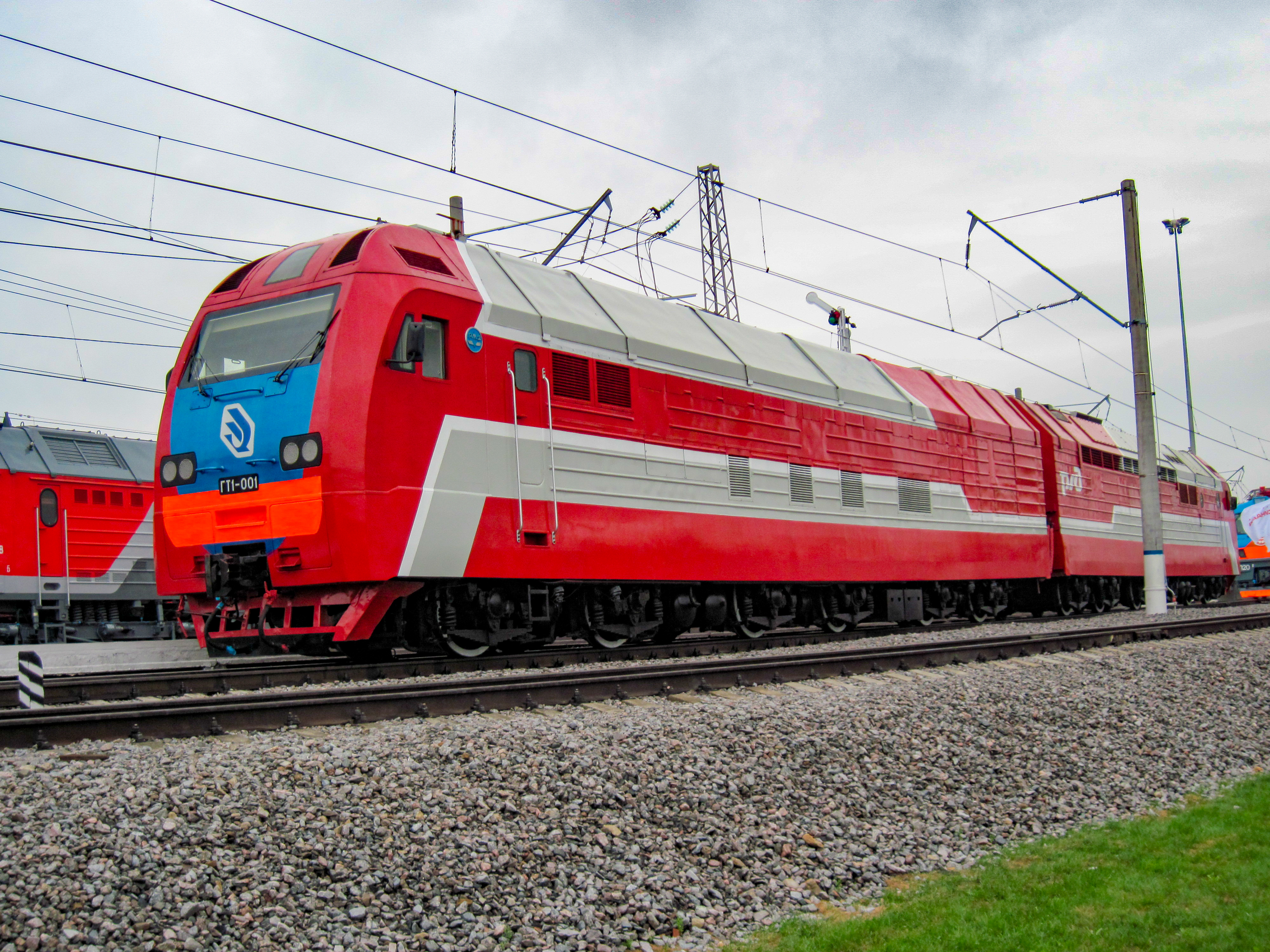
GT1-001 locomotive, view from the booster unit side

During the process of converting the electric locomotive into a gas-turbine locomotive at the Voronezh Plant, the bogies and the locomotive body underwent major repairs; at the same time, the original metal cabs were cut off and replaced with new semi-aerodynamic fiberglass cabs, similar to the cabs of ES4K and ES5K locomotives. The roof of the body was also cut off to be replaced with a new, taller modular one, and air intake grilles and hinged doors were cut into the side walls for access to equipment from the outside, while some windows were removed. By the end of 2006, the gas turbine locomotive was almost fully assembled, and the final equipment installation was completed in the spring of 2007. The locomotive received a red paint scheme with gray and white stripes on the side, a gray roof, and a blue front panel with an orange stripe. The production cost of the gas turbine locomotive amounted to 200 million Russian rubles.

Subsequently, the GT1-001 locomotive underwent multiple modernizations at the VNIKTI facility in Kolomna, where the main modifications were made to its fuel system and control system equipment. In 2012, the gas-turbine locomotive was modernized by replacing the auxiliary diesel generator power unit with a fuel tank with a traction battery for manoeuvers with the gas-turbine engine turned off, receiving the index "h" (hybrid). At the same time, its paint scheme was slightly altered: a stripe of light green color with yellow inscriptions "СПГ-Гибрид" and "LNG-Hybrid" appeared on the lower parts of the side walls.

After the adjustment of the fuel system and the successful completion of tests of the GT1-001 gas-turbine locomotive, the Russian Railways began considering the issue of serial production of such locomotives. The Voronezh plant had only modernized an existing locomotive, and for new gas-turbine locomotives, the assembly of new bodies and crew compartments was required. It was planned to organize their production at the Novocherkassk Electric Locomotive Plant, which had previously serially produced the bodies and bogies of VL15 locomotives, as well as VL85, VL65, EP1, and EP1M locomotives with similar mechanical designs, which could ensure the development of GT1 gas-turbine locomotive production with minimal costs. However, Transmashholding, which included this plant, did not show initiative in developing the gas turbine locomotive project and required Russian Railways to independently resolve a number of issues related to the locomotive's design, as well as set the condition of creating a network of gas refueling stations along the proposed route of their service before beginning production. Since the negotiations did not lead to the expected agreements, Russian Railways decided to consider further production of gas turbine locomotives by other companies.

=== Second locomotive ===
TE8 locomotives, the locomotives are similar in design to GT1h-002

In the beginning of 2012, the management of Russian Railways reached a preliminary agreement with the Sinara Group on the organization of mainline gas-turbine locomotive production at the Lyudinovsky Locomotive Plant, which is part of the group. Previously, this plant had produced the TGM10 shunting gas-turbine locomotive with a booster unit containing compressed natural gas cylinders. In June of the same year, the companies signed a contract, which provided for the production of a prototype locomotive in 2013, and, in case of successful testing, the organization of serial production of an additional 39 locomotives.

It was decided to develop a new gas-turbine locomotive based on the component platform of locomotives produced by the Sinara Group, for which the project was completely redesigned. As with the first locomotive, VNIKTI became the lead developer of the design and technical documentation for the new machine and coordinated the production of components and assembly of the locomotive. The design flaws of the first machine based on the VL15 were taken into account when developing a gas-turbine locomotive. It was decided to increase the fuel tank capacity on the booster unit and make it open to allow for its replacement with another tank instead of refueling, as well as to enhance safety.

In the original design, the new gas-turbine locomotive had a running gear composed of three two-axle bogies, as in the first locomotive, but using cabs and body parts standardized with the 2ES6 locomotives, produced by the Ural Locomotives plant in Yekaterinburg, which is part of the Sinara Group. However, the Lyudinovsky plant, which was entrusted with manufacturing the machine, did not produce locomotives with a running gear of this design, and in order to speed up production, it was decided to make the locomotive eight-axle based on the running gear of serially produced TEM7A, TEM14, and TE8 diesel locomotives, with two four-axle articulated bogies and a distance between coupler centers of 21,500 mm (70 ft 6 in). This led to an increase in the mass of each unit compared to the first gas-turbine locomotive, up to 184 tonnes (406,000 lb) instead of 150 (330,000); however, due to the greater number of powered axles, it was expected that the locomotive's tractive performance would improve, and the axle load decreased to 23 tonnes (51,000 lb) per axle. Despite such significant differences in design compared to the first gas-turbine locomotive, the locomotive was still assigned to the same class — GT1h.

The gas-turbine engine, as with the first locomotive, was manufactured by SNTK named after Kuznetsov; the new, improved traction generator — by LLC “Elektrotyazhmash-Privod” (Lysva); the traction electric motors — by GP “Elektrotyazhmash” (Kharkiv); the cryogenic fuel tank — by OJSC “Uralkriomash” (Nizhny Tagil); the cryogenic pump — by Fives Cryomec (Switzerland); the gas receiver and a number of fuel system components — by OJSC “Kriomash-BZKM” (Balashikha); the cab and control panel, as well as the auxiliary power converter — by NPP “Horizont” and NPO “Avtomatika” (Yekaterinburg); and the microprocessor control system was developed by VNIKTI.

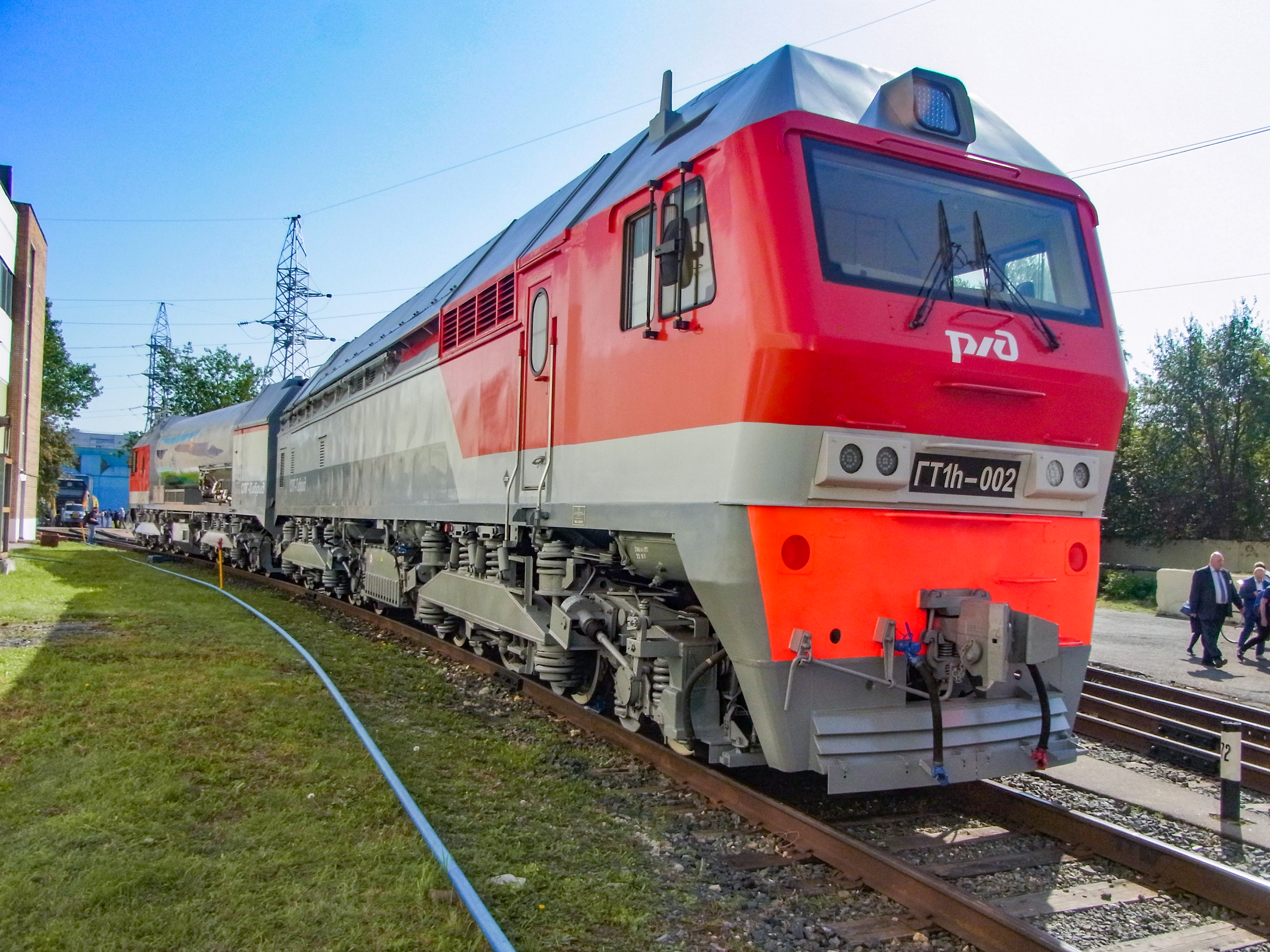
GT1h-002 locomotive, view from the traction and power unit side

In January 2013, the Lyudinovsky plant manufactured the booster unit and began construction of the traction-energy unit, which was assembled in June of the same year. The locomotive received the three-color red-gray corporate livery of Russian Railways according to a scheme similar to the 2ES6 electric locomotives: the upper half of the body in the cab area and the narrow upper stripe in the machine compartment area are painted red; the roof, narrow middle stripe in the cab area at the level of the buffer lights, which then curves upward and continues as a wide stripe in the machine compartment area, is light gray; and the frame, lower half of the rear body, track cleaner, and bogies are dark gray. The cryogenic tank was painted light gray and featured a design on both sides depicting butterflies flying over a green meadow.

Initially, the Russian Railways planned to sign a contract for the supply of 39 more GT1h gas-turbine locomotives before early 2015, to be delivered by the end of 2020. However, due to the economic crisis in Russia and the lack of infrastructure for natural gas liquefaction plants and refueling stations for these locomotives, the plans for the production of these gas-turbine locomotives were constantly cancelled and reduced in volume. In October 2016, following the tests of the GT1h-002, the Sinara Group received permission to produce a pilot series of 24 similar machines. In 2017, the assembly of the third locomotive was planned to begin, but these plans were never implemented. In 2019, Russian Railways concluded a letter of intent with the Sinara Group for the production of 23 gas-turbine locomotives by 2025; however, by mid-2020, their production had not yet started.

In the long term, the Lyudinovsky plant is considering the possibility of developing an intermediate tender unit with an additional cryogenic fuel tank for its gas turbine locomotive. This unit is planned to be coupled between the traction and booster units, enabling the operation of gas turbine locomotives without refueling over distances of up to 1,400 km (870 mi). According to the project, the unit will be shorter than the traction units and will rest on two two-axle non-powered bogies. At the ends of the tender unit, it is planned to equip compartments with cryogenic pumps, which will transfer fuel to the power unit, both from it and from the booster unit; these compartments will be equipped with side entrances and inter-sectional gangways.

== General characteristics ==
=== Purpose ===
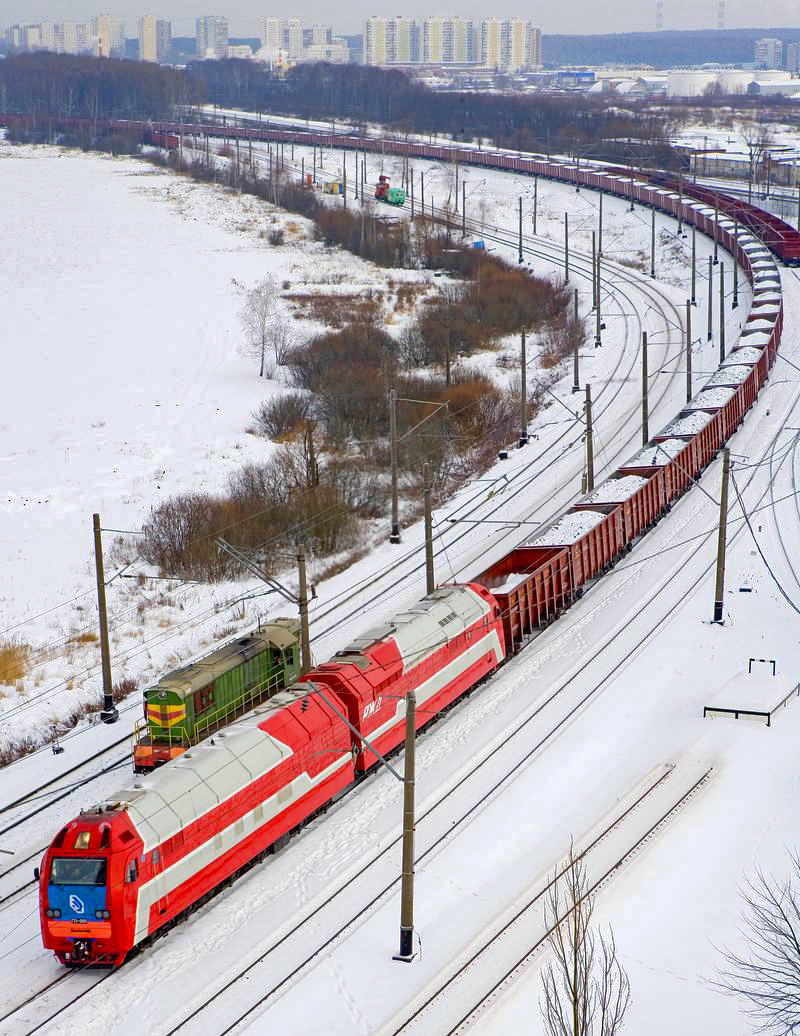
GT1-001 locomotive with a long freight train

Mainline gas-turbine locomotives GT1 (GT1h) are designed for hauling freight trains of increased length and weight or operating in mountainous areas with complex profiles on non-electrified railway lines with a gauge of 1,520 mm (4 ft 11 27/32 in). They can be operated in temperate climate conditions at ambient temperatures ranging from −50 to +40 °C (−58 to 104 °F), while, compared to diesel locomotives, they do not require preheating of the engine in winter and are significantly more environmentally friendly in terms of harmful emissions. The nominal service life of the locomotive is 40 years.

In terms of power, the dual-unit GT1h gas-turbine locomotives are comparable to triple-unit 3TE25K/3TE25A series diesel locomotives or to a system of two dual-unit mainline diesel locomotives of the 2TE10 or 2TE116 series (in a quadruple-unit configuration), which allows their use when switching from electric to autonomous traction without reconfiguring freight trains to a lower weight or using two locomotives to haul them. Since the overall power of diesel locomotives is lower than that of electric locomotives, freight trains often have to be separated and moved in parts over non-electrified railway sections, whereas a gas turbine locomotive can transport the trains as a whole. At the same time, gas turbine locomotives are shorter and lighter than double sets of three or four diesel units of similar total power and are cheaper to maintain.

From an economic point of view, the use of gas-turbine locomotives is most advantageous in regions of natural gas production or along main gas pipelines, where inexpensive transportation and liquefaction of gas, as well as refueling station equipment along the railway network, are possible. However, due to the increased fuel consumption of gas-turbine engines at idle or under low load compared to diesel engines, the operation of gas-turbine locomotives becomes profitable only when they are used for hauling heavy trains for the majority of operational time.

=== Technical specifications ===
The GT1h-001 (based on VL15) and GT1h-002 (structurally similar to TE8 and 2ES6) gas-turbine locomotives have the following main specifications:
Parameters		Locomotive type	
Parameters		GT1h-001 (Based of VL15)	GT1h-002 (Similar to TE8 and 2ES6)
Axial formula		2×(2_{0}–2_{0}–2_{0})	2×(2_{0}+2_{0}–2_{0}+2_{0})
Dimensions
Length in milimeters	Along the coupler axles	2×22 530 = 45 060	2×21 500 = 43 000
Length in milimeters	Along the frame	21 310	20 366
Width in milimeters	On the body	3180	3150
Width in milimeters	On the frame	3240	3150
Height from the track in milimeters	Roofs on antennas	5250	?
Height from the track in milimeters	Automatic coupler axles	1060	
Dimensions of the running gear in milimeters	Full wheelbase	16 430	17 200
Dimensions of the running gear in milimeters	Bogie center base	6765+6765	10 900
Dimensions of the running gear in milimeters	Bogie wheelbase	2900	3×2100
Dimensions of the running gear in milimeters	Wheel diameter	1250	1050
Dimensions of the running gear in milimeters	Track gauge	1520	
Dimensions of the running gear in milimeters	Minimum curve	125 000	
Weight
Service weight in tonnes		2×150=300	2×184=368
Axle load in tonnes		25	23
Fuel supply in tonnes	Liquefied gas (for GTD)	17	20
Fuel supply in tonnes	Diesel fuel (for auxiliary diesel)	0,4 (before modernization)	–
Traction and power characteristics
Gas turbine power in kilowatts (horsepower)		8300 (11 284)	8500 (11 557)
Auxiliary diesel generator power in kilowatts		400 (before modernization)	–
Traction electric motors power in kilowatts	Hourly mode	–	16×459,7=7355 (10 000 hp)
Traction electric motors power in kilowatts	Long-term mode	12×560=6720 (9137 hp)	16×415,6=6650 (9040 hp)
Thrust force in kilonewtons (tons per force)	When accelerating	883 (90)	981 (100)
Thrust force in kilonewtons (tons per force)	Hourly mode	–	775 (79)
Thrust force in kilonewtons (tons per force)	Long-term mode	620 (63)	775 (79)
Thrust force in kilonewtons (tons per force)	At maximum speed	245 (25)	255 (26)
Speed in kilometers per hour	Hourly mode	–	33
Speed in kilometers per hour	Long-term mode	38	30
Speed in kilometers per hour	Design speed	100	

== Design ==
The GT1 series of gas-turbine locomotives consists of two leading traction units — a traction-energy unit, which houses the turbo generator power plant, and a booster unit, which contains the cryogenic fuel tank. The units are standardized in the design of the crew compartments, the driver’s cabs, and partially the bodies, and they have the same length, dimensions, and service weight. However, due to the separation of the fuel tank and the power plant into different units, they cannot operate independently and are not interchangeable, unlike the diesel locomotives, which have individual engines and fuel tanks. The mechanical components of first- and second-type gas-turbine locomotives differ significantly, as do the electrical machines and devices, while the overall equipment layout, fuel system, and gas-turbine engine have similar designs.

=== Body ===
GT1 locomotives of both variants have steel wagon-type bodies with a single driver's cab in each unit and an inter-section gangway on the side opposite the cab. They consist of a main load-bearing frame, frames for attaching panels and equipment, internal partitions, side and rear panels, a modular driver's cab, and a modular roof. The bodies of the traction-energy and booster units differ from each other in a number of elements on the side and rear panels and roof, in the arrangement of internal partitions, as well as the absence of panels and roof in the area of the fuel tank on the second type of gas turbine locomotive. Between the traction-energy unit and the rear part of the booster unit, a gangway is possible via the inter-sectional transitions; however, access to the front part of the booster unit is not provided due to the cryogenic fuel tank. At the ends of the frame, SA-3 automatic couplers are installed, used for coupling the units with each other at the rear sides and for coupling the locomotive with other rolling stock at the front. The car body dimensions in both variants are 1T.

==== Body of the first locomotive ====
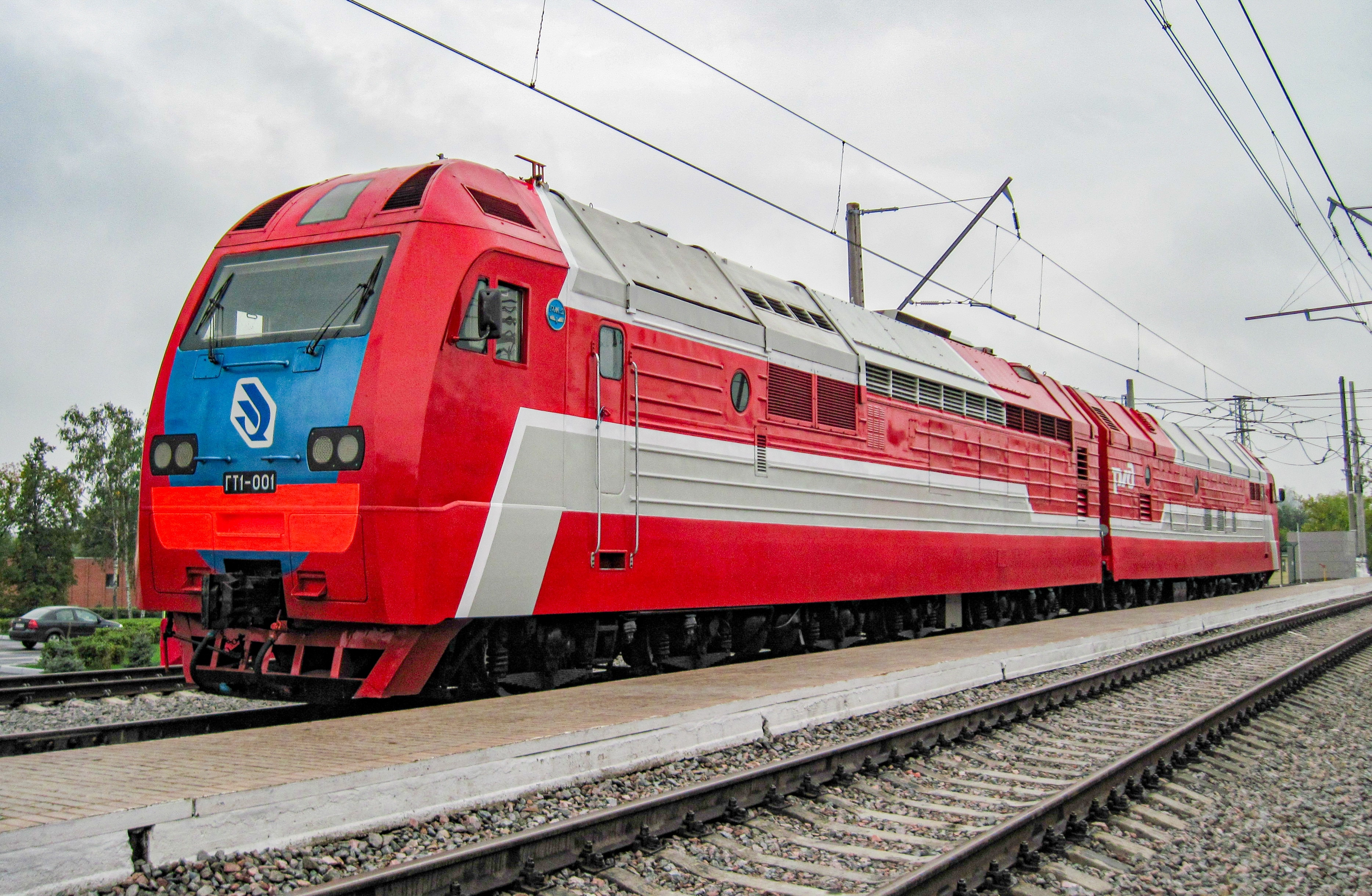
GT1-001 locomotive, view from the traction-energy unit side

The body of the first GT1 gas-turbine locomotive was modified from the body of the VL15 electric locomotive. The modification involves the installation of a new driver's cab and a higher modular roof, the cutting of hatches and air intake grilles in the side panels, and a number of other design changes to them, dictated by the placement of the gas-turbine power unit, cryogenic equipment, and fuel tank in the locomotive. The original VL15 body, manufactured at the Novocherkassk Electric Locomotive Plant, is structurally close to the body of the VL85 AC electric locomotive, produced by the same plant. The length of the body of each unit is 22,530 mm (73 ft 11 in), and 21,310 mm (69 ft 11 in) between buffer beams; the width of the body at the lower part in the frame area is 3,240 mm (10 ft 8 in), and in the main part along the side panels is 3,180 mm (10 ft 5 in).

The basis of the body of each unit is a rectangular load-bearing frame, which has a welded structure and carries all types of longitudinal and transverse loads. The frame consists of two longitudinal beams made of channels and connected by 12 mm (0.47 in) thick metal sheets, transverse buffer beams that join the longitudinal beams at the ends, and truss-type transverse beams with a box section that connect the longitudinal beams at the points where the suspension elements of the body are attached to the bogies. All load-bearing elements and frame nodes are welded with continuous seams and form a power structure designed for a compressive longitudinal force of 2,940 kN (300 tf). At the end parts of the frame, boxes of the impact-absorbing apparatus with the SA-3 automatic coupler are welded into the buffer beams, and track cleaners are also attached on the cab side. The traction brackets of rear bogies are welded to the lower part of the buffer beams, while the bracket of the middle bogie is installed in the center on the lower surface of the truss-type intermediate beam. The centers of the bogies are spaced 6,765 mm (22 ft 2.3 in) apart. Below, the main reservoirs of the pneumatic system are suspended under the frame between the front and middle bogies, and between the middle and rear bogies — the battery boxes (on the booster unit of the first locomotive, prior to modernization to GT1h, a fuel tank was installed instead of external batteries).

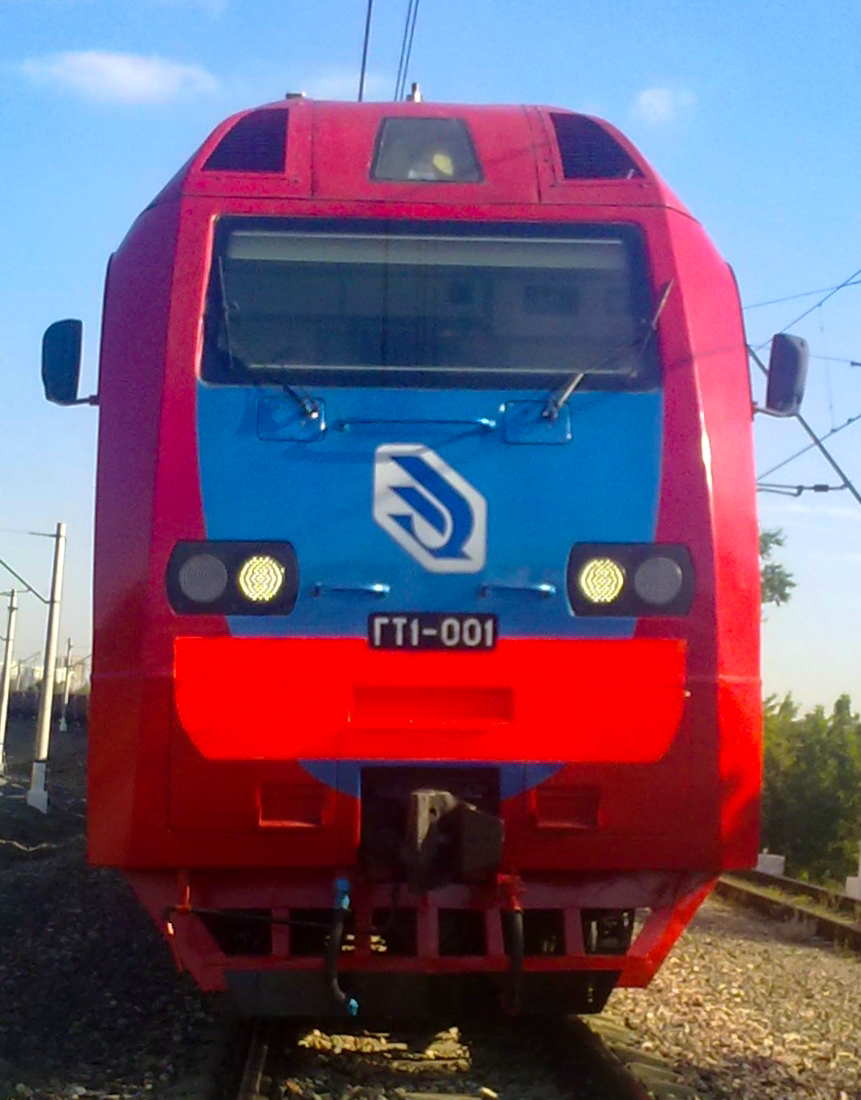
Front part of the cab of the GT1-001 locomotive

On the GT1h locomotive of the first type, instead of the original straight cabs from the VL15 with an inclined windshield, modular semi-aerodynamic convex cabs produced by NPP “Polet” with fiberglass cladding have been installed. In terms of design, the cab of the gas-turbine locomotive is practically similar to the cabs of the ES4K and ES5K locomotive families, which were also manufactured by the same company, but in the GT1 series they have a greater height above the headlight. The cab consists of a frame made of rigid horizontal and vertical metal profiles, on the outside of which plastic fairings are installed, and on the inside — internal cladding. The front part of the cab has a curved convex shape, which protrudes the most forward at the level of the frame and buffer lights, and has an arch-shaped curve at the top, smoothly transitioning into the roof. Below the windshield, it is equipped with a reinforcing belt to reduce the degree of locomotive damage and injury to the locomotive crew in the event of a collision. It withstands a load of 290 kN (30 tf) evenly distributed across the width of the front part. Narrow corner panels are placed along the edges of the front part at a slight angle, which gradually widen upward and curve to transition into the side slopes of the locomotive roof.

The cab has a single trapezoidal windshield narrowing at the top, equipped with two wipers beneath it. On the outside of the windshield fairing, on both sides of the automatic coupler, steps are welded, and above the automatic coupler there is a recessed step, while on both sides of the buffer lights, from the middle side and slightly below the windshield in the center, there are handrails. Above the windshield in the bend zone, a trapezoidal headlight narrowing at the top is installed, recessed into the cab body and tilted backward, and on either side of the headlight there are air intake grilles, which are absent on ES4K/ES5K electric locomotives. In the middle, between the automatic coupler and the bottom of the windshield, horizontal circular buffer LED lights are arranged in pairs, integrated into a single plastic housing and similar to the buffer lights of early-production ES4K and ES5K locomotives. Red tail lights are placed at the edges, while white lights are positioned closer to the center of the cab.

Under the lower fairings, an inclined plow with six slots is attached to the front buffer beam of the frame. The plow is designed to remove foreign objects from the track and is calculated for a longitudinal force of 120–140 kN (12–14 tf) applied along its lower edge. A visor is bolted to the underside of the plow, which has five rows of bolt holes, allowing its height above the rail head level to be adjusted depending on wheel tread wear.

On the sides of the gas-turbine locomotive driver's cab, there are two side windows, similar to those on early models of the ES4K/ES5K locomotives — a triangular fixed window and a rectangular window with a downward-sliding pane, in front of which rear-view mirrors are installed. In the engine compartment area, of the three round portholes on each side of the unit that were present on the VL15, the GT1 locomotive retains only one at the front along each side of the traction-energy unit, and the middle and rear ones on the right side of the fuel booster unit, while the remaining portholes are sealed with steel plates. For entry into the locomotive, behind the driver’s cab in the main part of the body, there are single-leaf doors on each side, opening inward; moreover, compared to the VL15, the door leaves are equipped with a rectangular window. To ensure the possibility of boarding from an embankment or low platform, vertical handrails are located on the sides of the doors, a recessed step is in the middle of the side frame, and below the body under the door there is a two-step ladder.

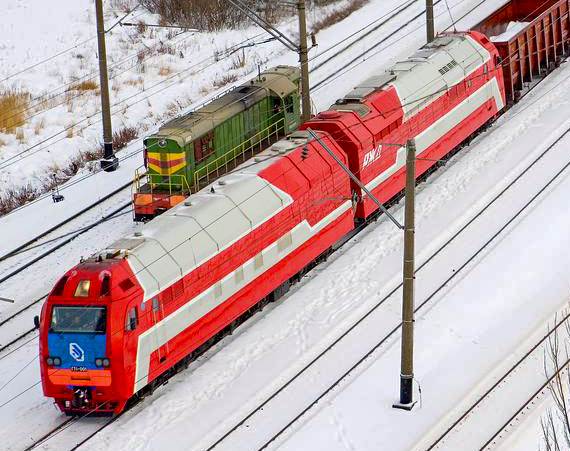
GT1-001 locomotive, top view from the booster unit side

The side panels behind the driver's cab consist of a frame made of rolled and bent profiles, sheathed with steel sheets 2 mm (0.079 in) thick. In the main part of the body, to increase the stiffness, the panels are equipped with longitudinal corrugations, while at the frame level they have a smooth surface and project 30 mm (1.2 in) on each side compared to the main panels. In the driver's cab, the height of the side panels is greater than in the main part of the body, above which the vertical part of the roof slopes is attached. Compared to the original electric locomotive, the sides of the gas-turbine locomotive have air intake grilles and hinged doors cut out, used for access to equipment from the outside and for filling the cryogenic fuel tank. At the front of each unit of the gas-turbine locomotive, at the window level on both sides, there are two ventilation grilles for the equipment chamber. In the booster unit, they are located directly behind the entrance door, while in the traction-energy unit, they are set at some distance. Further, in the traction-energy unit, opposite the main engine compartment with the gas turbine engine, at the junction of the side panel and the roof, there is a long row of ten air grilles. In the booster unit, small grilles are located on each side at mid-height in the area of the cryogenic tank. At the rear of the traction unit, on the port side near the cryogenic receiver, there are two grilles with wide slanted louvers, and at the rear of the booster unit, on the starboard side near the diesel generator or the traction battery, there is one grille.

The rear panels of the locomotive are sheathed with smooth steel sheets, while the main pneumatic system tanks that were present on the VL15 have been removed from them and relocated under the frame of the gas turbine locomotive. In the middle of the rear panels above the automatic couplers, there are inter-sectional gangways equipped with rear doors, metal transition platforms, and non-hermetic rubber bellows on the sides and above. On the left side of the inter-sectional space, assuming the traction-energy unit is at the front, nests for cryogenic liquid and gas fuel pipeline tubes are located on the rear panels at the locomotive floor level, connected by two flexible heat-insulated hoses. Slightly lower on both sides, there are sockets through which the units are connected by electrical cables.

The roof of the GT1h gas-turbine locomotive of the first type has an angular profile with a horizontal central section and sloping side slopes, and consists of separate modular panels with transverse protruding joints. Some of the roof panels are removable to allow for the installation and removal of the locomotive's internal equipment during maintenance. At the front, the roof has a rounded smooth slope with an integrated headlight and ventilation grilles on either side. Above the driver's cabs, communication antennas are installed on the roofs, while the side slopes house the air intakes for the cab's air conditioning and ventilation system. Ventilation grilles are also present in the side slopes above the rear part of the equipment compartment of the unit. On the horizontal part of the roof of the traction-energy sunit, there is a block of multi-cyclone air filters and an exhaust system grille for the spent gases.

==== Body of the second locomotive ====
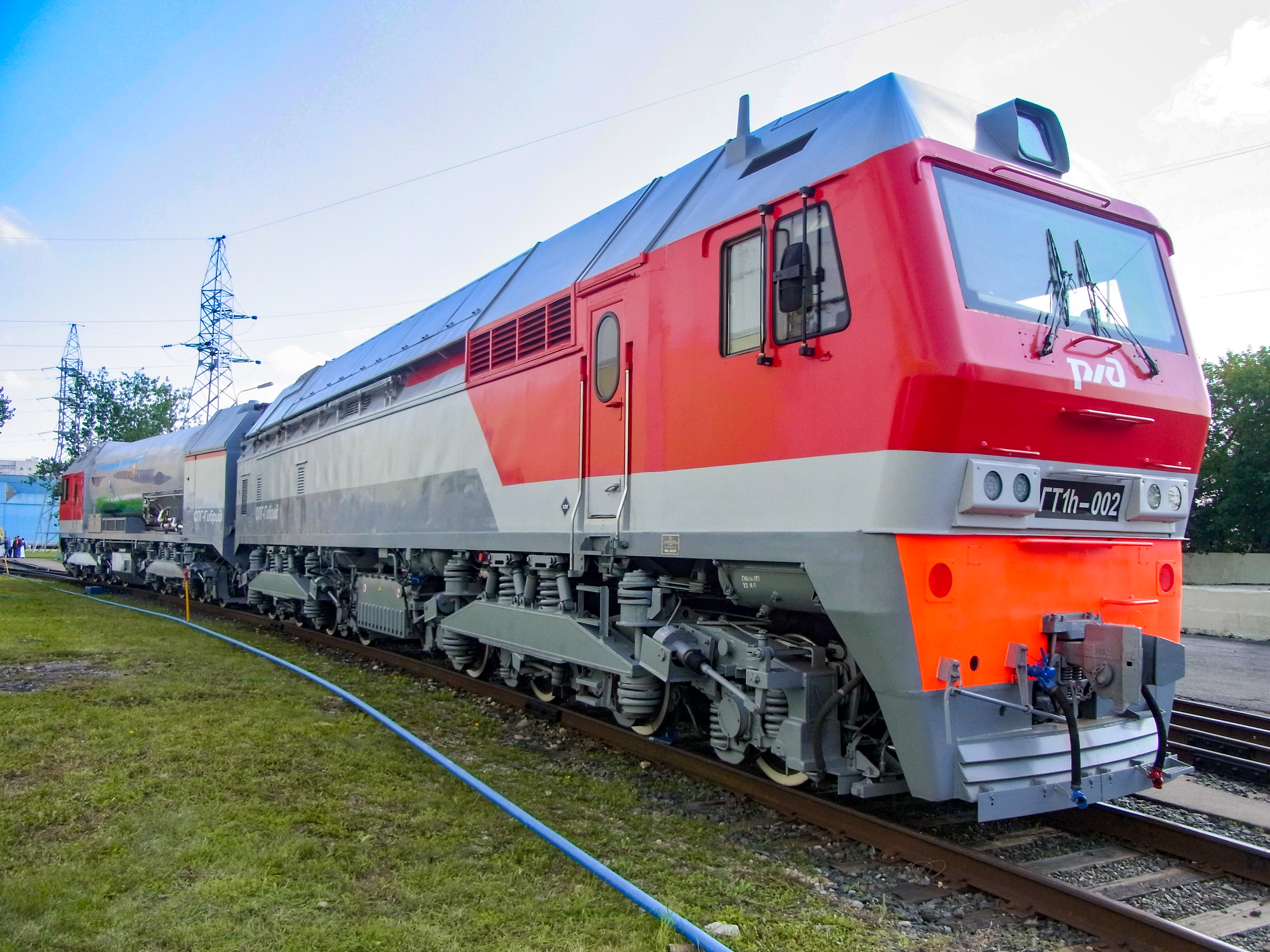
GT1h-002 locomotive, view from the traction-energy unit side

The body of the GT1h gas-turbine locomotive of the second type is similar in frame construction to the TE8 diesel locomotive, and in the design of the cabin and side panels—to the 2ES6 electric locomotive, but compared to the latter, it has a greater length, as well as the shape and height of the roof. The length of the body of each unit is 21,500 mm (70 ft 6 in), and 20,366 mm (66 ft 9.8 in) mm over the buffer beams; the width is 3,150 mm (10 ft 4 in).

The basis of the body of each unit is a rectangular load-bearing frame with a welded structure that absorbs all types of longitudinal and transverse loads. Structurally, the unit frame of the gas-turbine locomotive is based on the frames of TEM7 and TE8 diesel locomotives, with a number of modifications due to the placement of different equipment and the installation of a wagon-type body instead of a hood-type one. The frame consists of longitudinal backbone I-beams, shifted from the edges of the locomotive inward and connected by a deck of steel sheets 10–12 mm (0.39 in – 0.47 in) thick, peripheral channels along the edges of the locomotive, tie boxes, kingpin units, and transverse partitions forming the structural framework. The longitudinal beams are reinforced on the top and bottom by flanges and are connected at the ends by tie boxes welded to the frame's load-bearing elements, with transverse partitions of steel sheets in the spaces between the boxes, which have cutouts for the cooling air ducts of the traction motors. The side channels on the sides are connected to the ridge beams by transverse brackets, located at the top of the frame and are relatively thin compared to the beams, creating free space alongside the beams, which is partially occupied by the springs of the body suspension system on the bogies. At the rear parts of the frame, SA-3 couplers with an energy-absorbing device are installed, and on the cab side, a plow is attached to the frame. At a distance of 10,900 mm (35 ft 9 in) from each other, reinforcements for the installation of bogie kingpins have been made in the middle of the frame, and cast brackets for the suspension system have been welded to the sides of them. Under the frame of the traction-energy unit, instead of the diesel fuel tank used on diesel locomotives, a box with traction batteries is suspended in the center between the bogies, and under the frame of the booster unit — a box with cooling fans for the traction motors. Below, four main tanks of the pneumatic system are suspended longitudinally to the frame between the bogies and the central box, and on the right side under the driver's cab — a tank for the brake pneumatic system.

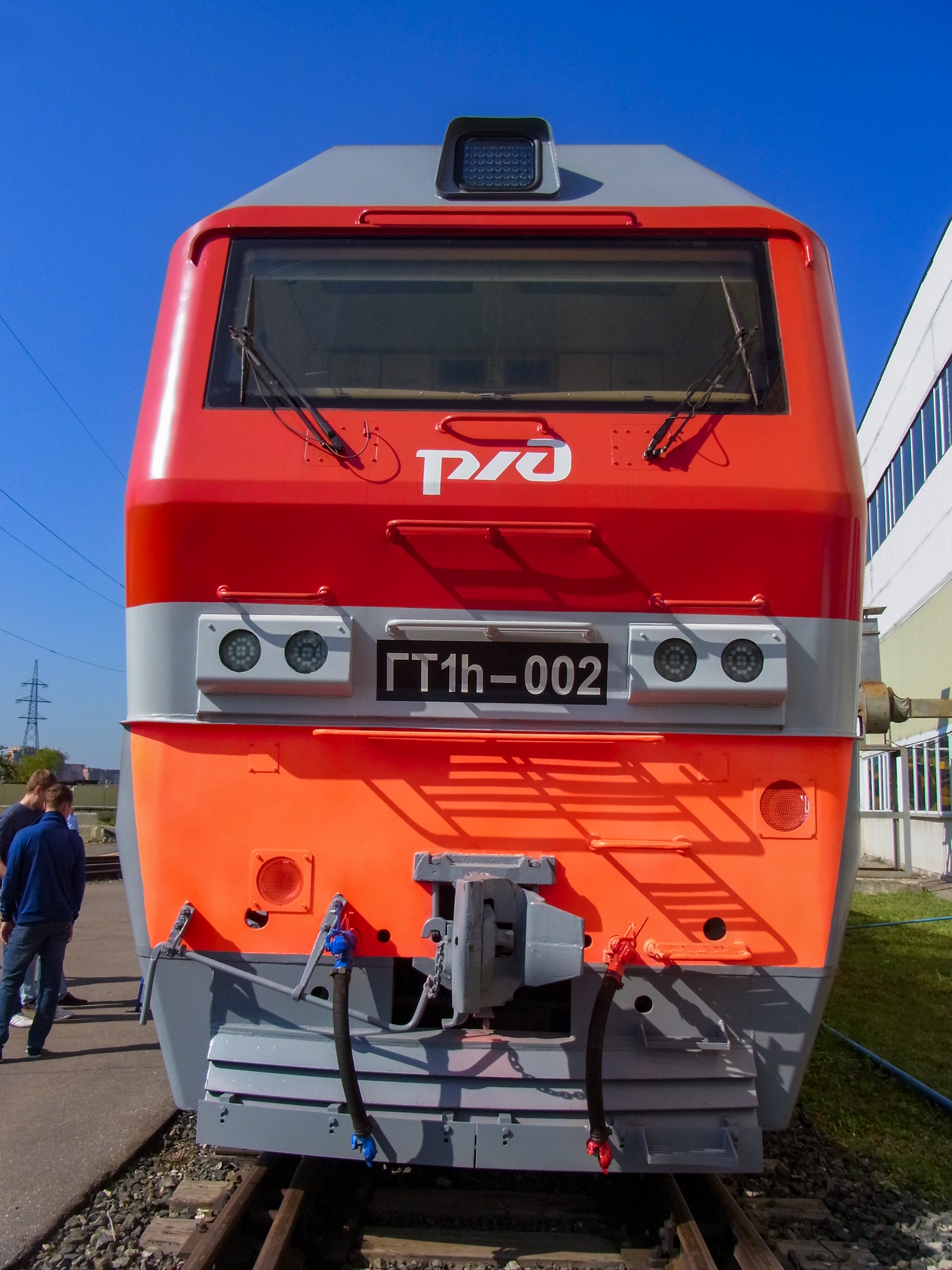
Front part of the cab of the GT1h-002 locomotive

The GT1h type 2 gas-turbine locomotive is equipped with modular, angular-shaped cabs manufactured by NPO "Horizon" in Yekaterinburg, similar in design to the cabs of 2ES6 electric locomotives and TE8 diesel locomotives. The front of the cab features a curved profile made of two flat slanted panels with a forward-projecting bend, beneath which is located the vertical front frame panel. The front part of the cab in the area of the lower slanted panel is equipped with a reinforcing belt to reduce the extent of locomotive damage and injuries to the crew in the event of a serious collision. It can withstand a load of 290 kN (30 tf), evenly distributed across the width of the front unit.

Most of the upper panel area is occupied by the rectangular-shaped windshield of the driver's cab, equipped with two wipers beneath it. Above the windshield, a square-shaped LED spotlight with a trapezoidal frame is built into the roof. At the level between the automatic coupler and the bottom of the windshield, horizontal buffer LED lights of a circular shape are arranged in pairs on the lower part of the inclined panel, embedded in a slightly forward-protruding rectangular housing. The white lights are positioned at the edges, while the red tail lights are closer to the center of the cab, that is, opposite the arrangement of the lights on the GT1h-001. Initially, the buffer lamps were covered with rectangular frosted glass, similar to those on TE8 diesel locomotives; however, they were later removed. Between the buffer lamps, there is a plate indicating the class and number of the gas-turbine locomotive. The cab is equipped with horizontal handrail-steps, positioned centrally directly above and below the windshield, in the middle between the plate and the curve of the windshield, and below the plate.

Below the level of the cab floor is a vertically tapering front frame panel that narrows smoothly toward the bottom. A plow is attached to its lower part, serving as its continuation and also tapering downward. The plow is designed to remove foreign objects from the track and is rated for a longitudinal force of at least 137 kN (14.0 tf) applied to its lower edge. Slightly above the plow, a coupler protrudes from beneath the front frame panel, and pneumatic hose passages are located on either side of it. On the left side is the uncoupling lever, while on the right, steps are welded to it and the plow. The plow has three slanted edges at the bottom, to the lowest of which a vertical visor is bolted. The visor has three rows of bolt holes, allowing its height above the rail heads to be adjusted depending on wheel tire wear. Metal brushes for track cleaning can be installed on the plow in the area where the covers of the gear drive of wheel-motor units pass.

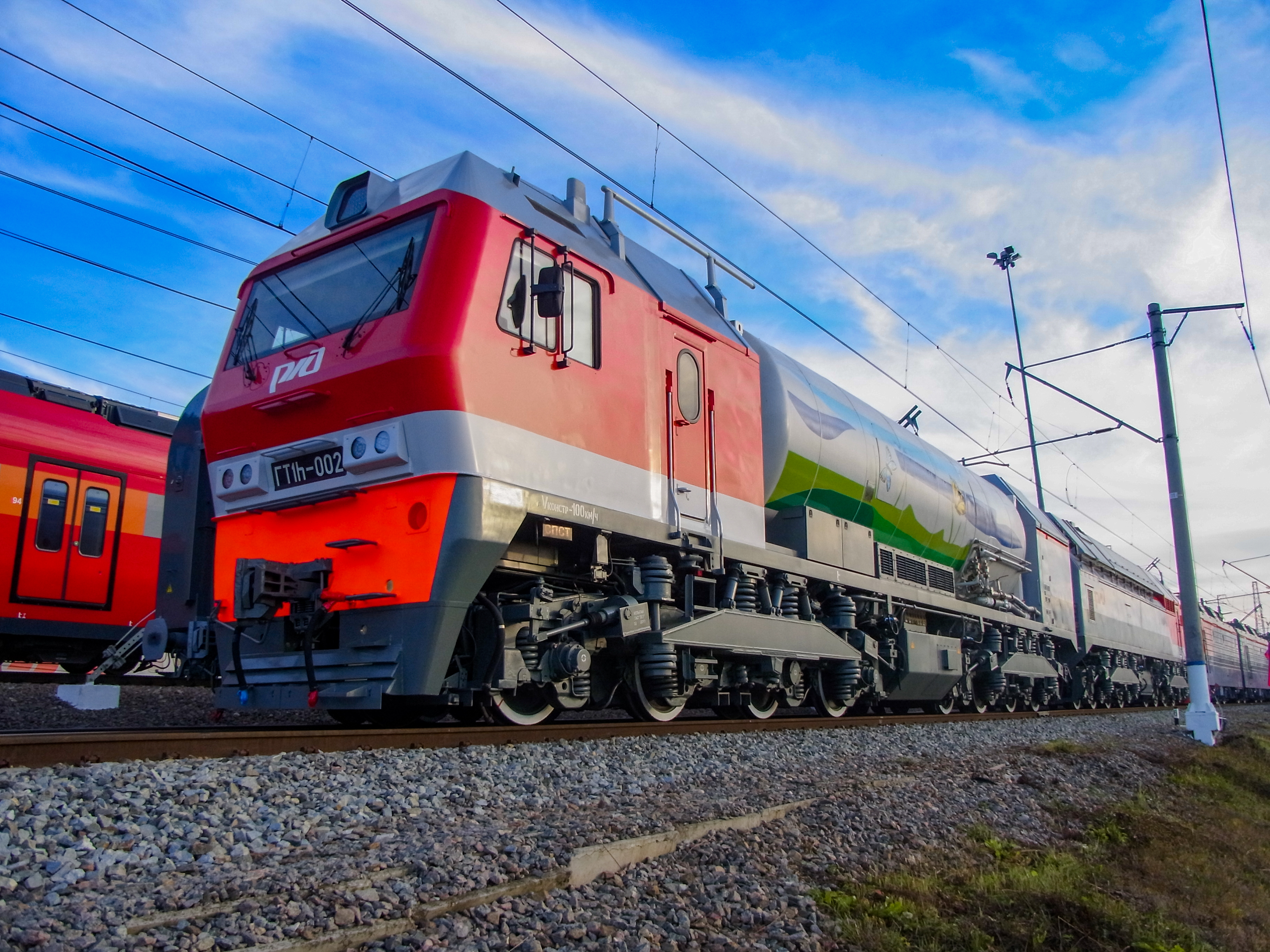
GT1h-002 locomotive, view from the booster unit side

On the sides of the driver’s cab of the gas-turbine locomotive, there are two side windows, structurally similar to those on the 2ES6 electric locomotive — a trapezoidal fixed window and a rectangular window with a forward-sliding pane, in front of which rear-view mirrors are installed. To access the locomotive behind the driver’s cab, in the main part of the body, there are single-leaf doors with oval windows on each side, opening inward, similar to the doors of serial 2ES6 electric locomotives. To facilitate boarding from an embankment or low platform, vertical handrails are attached on either side of the doors, a step is bolted to the frame’s encasing channel, and a vertical ladder is fixed to the bogie body.

The side panels of the main body section behind the cab consist of a framework made of rolled and bent steel profiles, covered with 3 mm (0.12 in) thick steel sheets. Compared to the first locomotive, the panels have a smooth surface, while in the booster unit, in the area of the cryogenic tank, they are absent. In the panels of the main body section of both units, there are opening hatches for access to equipment from the outside, as well as ventilation grilles. In the side panels of the traction-energy unit, next to the entrance door, four ventilation grilles of the equipment compartment are built into each side under the roof. Further, at the same level, the panels of the section are bent inward at an angle to the very end of the unit, forming an air space beneath the roof air intakes. For most of the length of this bend, triple electrical busbars are laid on insulators along both sides to supply power to the booster unit. In the booster unit, the side panels of the front and rear parts are straight up to the roof. Windows are absent in all engine compartments.

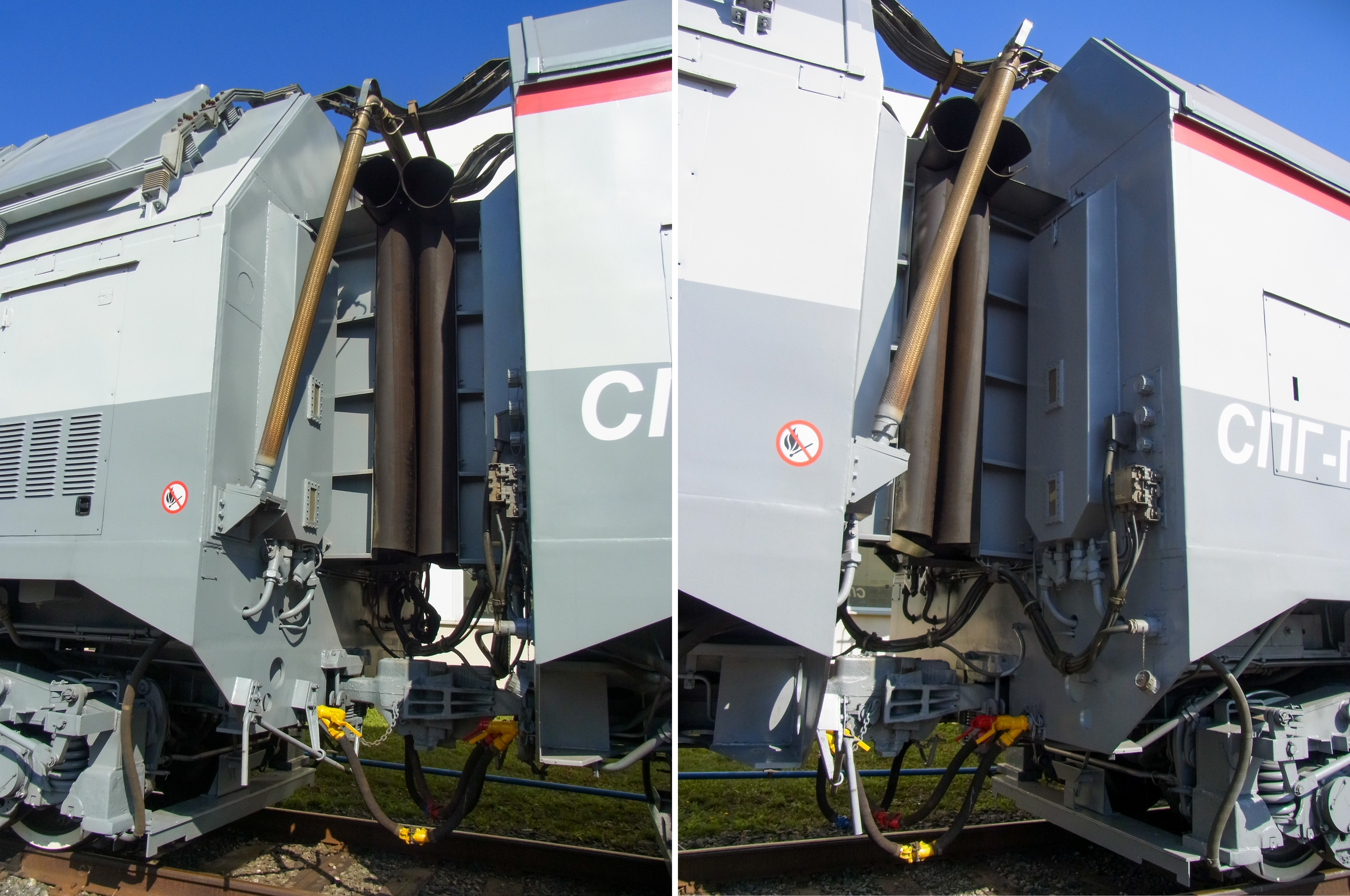
Inter-sectional gangway of the GT1h-002 locomotive. The fuel system pipeline, positioned at an angle, is visible, with electrical cables above and lateral bus wiring on the side.

The rear panels of both units of the locomotive and the intermediate panels of the booster unit at the edges of the fuel tank are sheathed with smooth steel sheets. In the middle of the rear panels above the automatic couplers, inter-sectional gangways are located, equipped with rear doors, metal transition platforms, and non-hermetic rubber bellows on the sides and above. On the sides of the inter-sectional gangway, rear sandboxes are mounted on the exterior panels. On the left side of the rear panel of each unit, at a level slightly above the locomotive frame, external sockets for the cryogenic fuel pipeline are installed, angled upwards and connected by a specially insulated U-shaped pipeline with flexible slanted pipes, the horizontal middle pipe of which is positioned transversely above the inter-sectional gangway. On the right side, beside the sandboxes, there are sockets for inter-sectional electrical connections, through which the units are connected by electrical cables suspended under the inter-sectional gangway above the automatic couplers.

The roof of the GT1h locomotive of the second type has an angular profile with a horizontal central part and sloping side slopes, and consists of separate modular panels with transverse protruding joints. Some roof panels are removable to allow for the installation and removal of the locomotive's internal equipment during maintenance. The front part of the roof above the driver's cab and the vestibule in both units has a similar design. Radio communication antennas are installed above the driver cabs on the roofs, air intakes of the cab air conditioning and ventilation system are located in the side slopes, and hatches for the front sandboxes are installed above the vestibules in the horizontal part of the roof. In the horizontal part of the traction-energy unit roof, a block of multi-cyclone air filters and a grille for the exhaust system for spent gases are installed, while under the slopes in the area of the main machinery compartment, at the bend of the side panels, air intakes for the gas turbine power plant are situated. The rear part of the roof of both units also has a similar design and is used for the installation of high-voltage inter-sectional bus ducts, which come along the sides of the traction-energy unit and extend under the booster roof.

=== Bogies ===
==== Bogies of the first locomotive ====
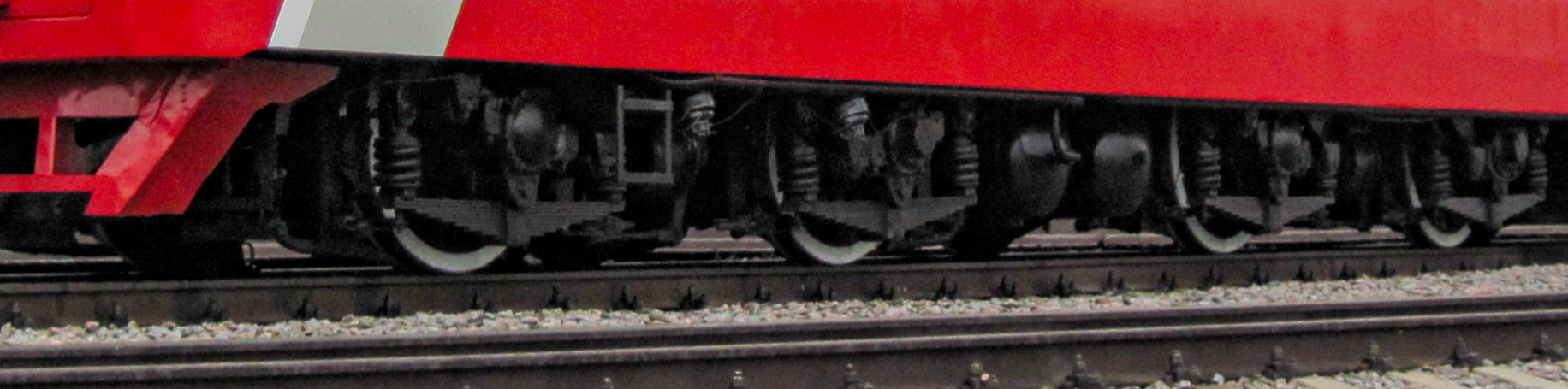
Front and middle bogie of the GT1-001 locomotive unit

Each unit of the GT1h-001 locomotive rests on three two-axle jawless and kingpinless traction bogies with two-stage cradle-spring suspension, inherited from the VL15 electric locomotive. In design, these bogies are also standardized with the bogies of VL85 locomotives. The bogies consist of a frame, a system of body and axlebox suspension, traction rods, wheel-motor units, and brake equipment. The design of the middle bogie slightly differs from the end bogies in the body suspension system and related elements to allow lateral movement of the bogie when negotiating curves, while the rear bogie of the unit differs from the front bogie by having a hand brake.

The bogie frame is its main load-bearing element and consists of two longitudinal side beams and three box-section transverse beams — a central one and two end beams, welded into a single structure from steel sheets. The sides of the frame have a slight lowering in the central part of the bogie. Brackets for attaching axlebox assemblies, the body suspension system, bogies and traction motors, vibration dampers, and the brake system are welded to the frame, projecting downward and to the sides of the bogie frame body from both the exterior and interior sides.

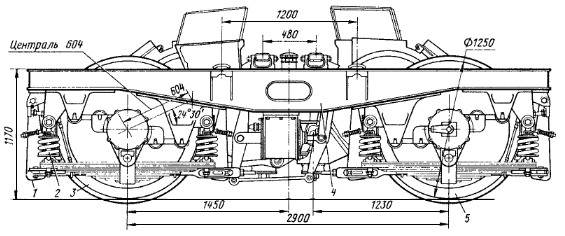
Middle bogie diagram

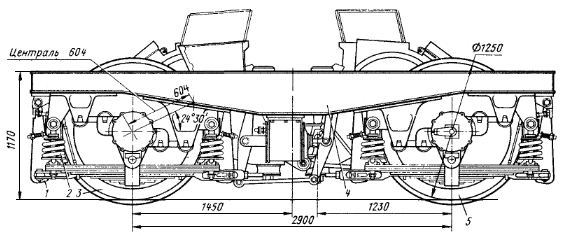
Rear bogie diagram

In the second stage of suspension, the body rests on the frame of each bogie through four elastic elements, two on each side, which serve both to transmit the vertical load from the body to the bogie and to allow slight lateral displacement or tilting of the body, generating an elastic counteracting force. On rear bogies, the supports are cradle suspensions, slightly inclined toward the center of the body relative to the vertical. A cradle suspension consists of a rod with a cradle base at the bottom and a washer with a support spring at the top. The body rests on the lower base through levers and a hinge mechanism, transmitting the force to the rod, which, with the help of the upper washer, rests on the bogie frame through a spring located around the upper part of the rod coaxially with it. Horizontal forces during the lateral movement of the body up to 30 mm (1.2 in) from the central position are taken up only by the cradle suspensions; from 30 to 45 mm (1.2 in to 1.8 in), the forces are taken up by the suspensions together with the spring, after which the stop rigidly limits the displacement. The rear bogies are also equipped with telescopic piston hydraulic dampers of double-acting type, installed between them and the car body frame at an angle of 45° to reduce the locomotive's impact on the track in the vertical direction. In the middle bogies, instead of inclined cradle suspensions, long vertical swinging supports in the form of rods with springs are used, resting on the bogies from below and serving as support for the car body from above, allowing the bogie to shift more sideways when navigating curves than with cradle suspensions. The deflection of the spring in the cradle suspension under a static load of 68.7 kN (15,400 lbf) is 77 mm (3.0 in), the spring stiffness of the cradle suspension is 0.893 kN/mm, and the stiffness of the horizontal stop is 1.8 kN/mm. The deflection of the middle bogie support under a static load of 63.7 kN (14,300 lbf) is 114 mm (4.5 in), with a stiffness of 0.559 kN/mm.

In the first stage of suspension, the bogie frame rests through eight coiled cylindrical springs on four leaf springs (two springs for each), which are individually suspended at the center via a hinge to the lower part of each of the four bogies. The leaf spring and the springs provide damping of shocks and vertical oscillations from the wheels when the locomotive is in motion. Each leaf spring consists of ten plates, 120 mm (4.7 in) wide and 16 mm (0.63 in) thick, arranged horizontally on top of each other in the shape of stylized wings — the three upper plates are of equal length, while the subsequent ones are progressively shortened. Each spring has 2.5 active coils and is made from a steel rod with a diameter of 42 mm (1.7 in). The spring diameter is 204 mm (8.0 in), the spring stiffness is 2747 N/mm, the equivalent stiffness per wheel is 1015 N/mm, the leaf spring stiffness is 1246 N/mm, the static deflection of the spring is 17 mm (0.67 in), and the static deflection of the leaf spring is 68.5 mm (2.70 in). To transmit forces from the axle box to the carriage frame and to maintain it in a vertical position, two links are used — upper and lower. The links are attached via a hinge to the frame brackets; on the side of the carriage edge, the link is positioned above the axle box axis and connected to a short bracket, while on the side of the carriage center, it is below the axle box axis and connected to a long bracket.

Traction and braking forces from the bogies to the car body are transmitted via a mechanism consisting of three inclined rods running longitudinally under the middle part of the locomotive. The bogie traction mechanism is composed of two rods and serves to move the attachment point of the inclined connecting rod with the car body from under the center of the bogie closer to its edge. One of the bogie rods has a complex shape in the form of a thick-sheeted acute triangle, to which an inclined bend adjoins at the tip of the acute part. The base of the triangle is attached to the brackets of the central beam of the bogie at two points along its edges and then tapers smoothly, descending at a slight downward angle to the bend point located beneath the axle of the wheelset, after which the continuation of the rod rises at a 45° angle to the horizontal, where it connects with another short cylindrical rod of the bogie, attached to the bracket of the end beam. At the place where the main rod of the bogie bends beneath the axle, an inclined cylindrical rod is attached to it for connection with the body frame. To ensure mobility, the rods are connected to each other and to the bogie frame using pins and hinges. On the side of the body, the inclined rod is attached to a buffer device that mitigates jolts.

The bogie has two wheel-motor units. A wheel-motor unit consists of an axle, two axle boxes, two wheels, two gear assemblies, a traction electric motor, and its suspension system. The traction electric motors are located centrally in the space between the trolley's central beam and the wheelset axle and have axle-supported suspension, rigidly resting on the axle through support lugs and motor-axle bearings, and elastically on the central beam through rubber washers and a metal bracket. The motors have individual drives for each axle through two gears mounted on the motor shaft on either side, which rotate large gears mounted on the wheelset axle next to the running wheels. The gear transmission ratio is 88:23 = 3.826, and the distance between the inner ends of the gears is 1,090 mm (3 ft 7 in). The running wheels have teardrop-shaped holes and are fitted with tires that are pressed onto them while hot. The diameter of the wheels with new tires at the rolling circle is 1,250 mm (4 ft 1 in), the distance between the inner ends of the tires is 1,440 mm (4 ft 9 in), the tire width is 140 mm (5.5 in), and the thickness of a new tire is 90 mm (3.5 in).

The trolley's brake system consists of two pneumatic brake cylinders, mounted on the sides in its middle on each side, a lever mechanism, and the brake shoes operated by it. In addition to the pneumatic brake cylinder, the lever mechanism of the rear bogie is also equipped with a hand brake drive. Each wheel is equipped with two brake shoes that clamp it from both sides while braking. The lever mechanism consists of rotating balances, rods, and horizontal linkages that transmit force from the cylinder to the inner brake shoes and then to the outer ones. The diameter of the brake cylinder is 356 mm (1 ft 2.0 in), the maximum pressure in the cylinder is 372 kPa, the installation stroke of the rod is from 70 to 85 mm (2.8 in to 3.3 in), the limit stroke is 150 mm (5.9 in), the pressing force of the brake shoes for one wheelset is 164 kN (37,000 lbf), the brake shoe pressure on the tire is 975 kPa, and the gear ratio is 1.43.

==== Bogie of the second locomotive ====
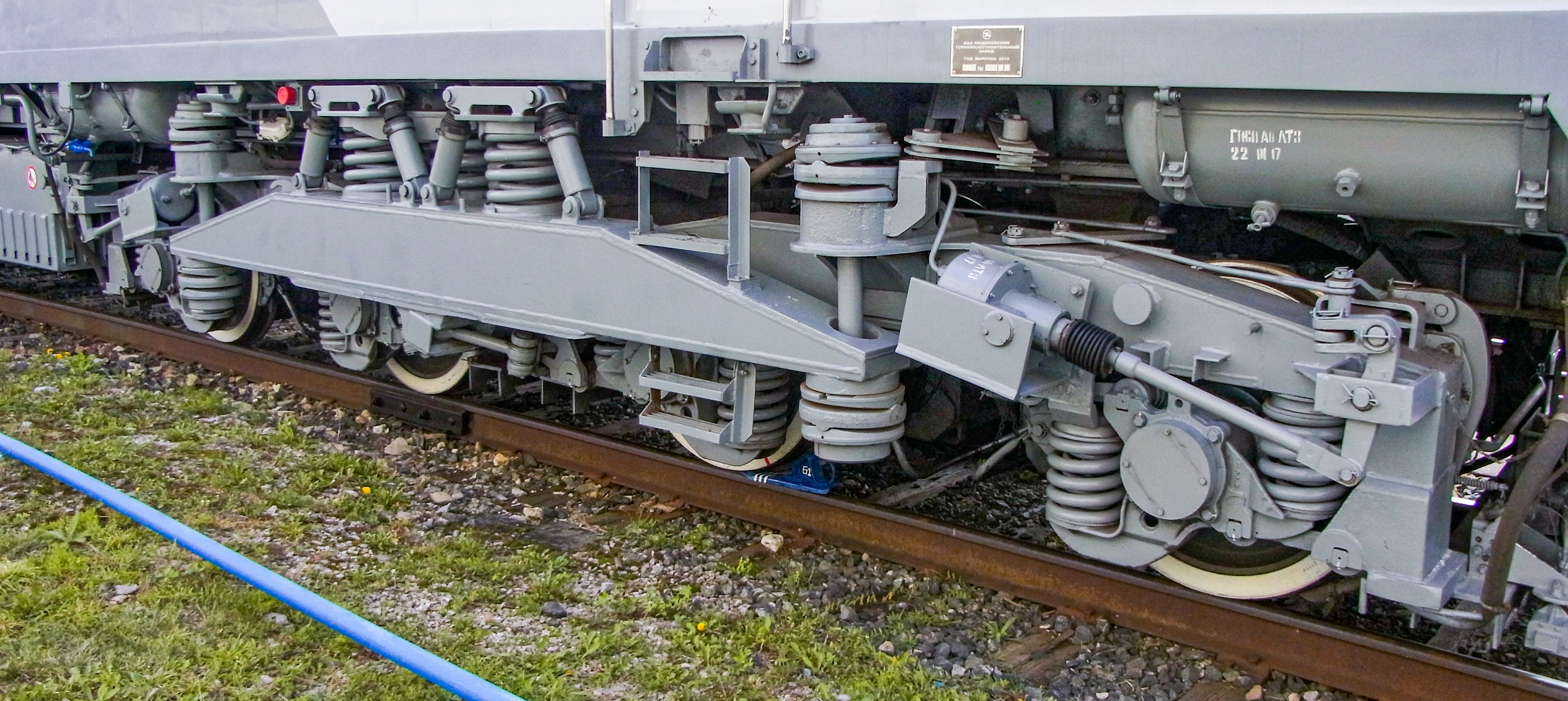
Front bogie of the traction-energy unit of the GT1h-002 locomotive

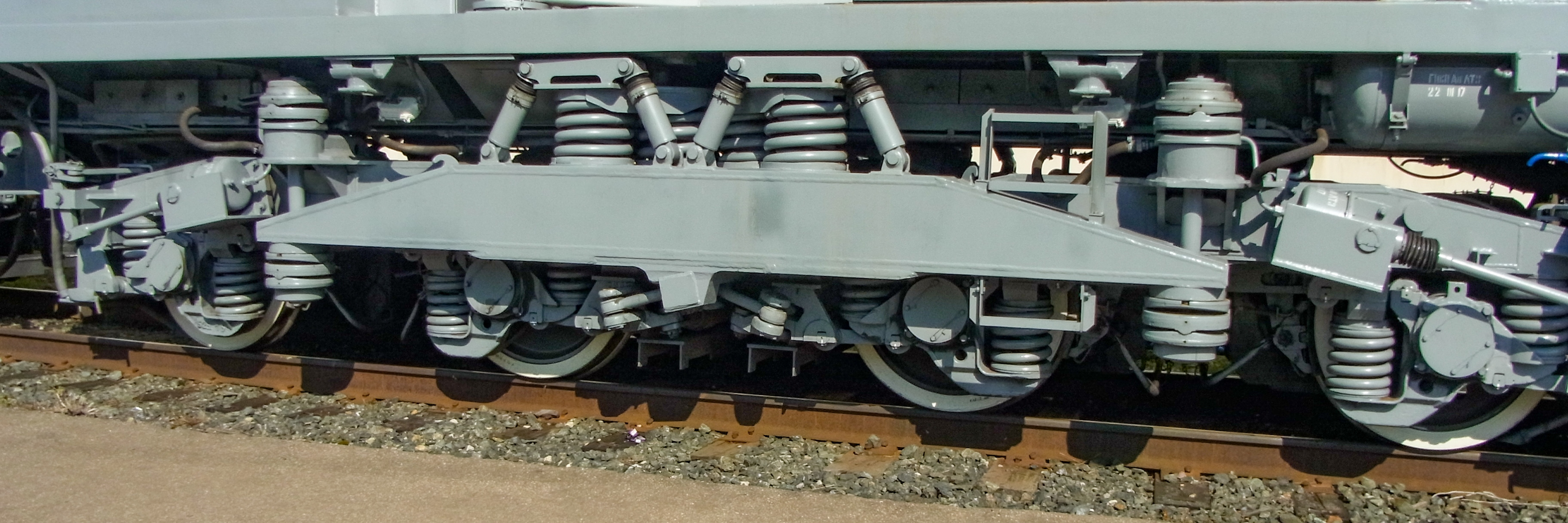
Rear bogie of the booster unit of the GT1h-002 locomotive

Each unit of the GT1h-002 locomotive of the serial type rests on two four-axle jawless pivot traction bogies with two-stage spring suspension, standardized in design with the eight-axle bogies of Lyudinovo plant locomotives of the TEM7, TEM14, and TE8 series. The four-axle bogies are articulated, consisting of an intermediate frame, a body spring suspension system, a pivot, and two two-axle bogies that can pivot relative to the four-axle intermediate frame, as well as a pendulum suspension system for the intermediate frame on them and inclined rods connecting the two-axle bogies with the common frame of the four-axle bogie. Each of the two-axle bogies has a welded-cast design and in turn consists of its own frame, journal-box spring suspension, wheel-motor units, and brake equipment. The distance from the center of the four-axle bogie to the centers of the two-axle bogies, as well as the wheelbase between the centers of two adjacent axles of the bogie, is 2,100 mm (6 ft 11 in).

The intermediate frame has an H-shaped form and consists of two longitudinal side beams, which are horizontally shaped in the center and inclined downward at the ends, and a transverse central beam, in the center of which there is a low-mounted kingpin to transfer horizontal forces to the body. The frame of each two-axle bogie is its main load-bearing element and consists of two longitudinal beams, also with downward inclines at the ends, and three transverse box-section beams — a central one and two low-mounted end beams, welded into a single structure from steel sheets. Protective beams, protruding slightly forward, are attached to the underside of the end beams of the two-axle bogies. Brackets are welded to the intermediate frame and bogie frames, and holes are drilled for mounting pendulum suspensions, spring suspension of the carbody and axlebox stages, rods, traction motors, and the brake system. Additionally, vertical ladders are welded to the inclined part of the intermediate frame of the locomotive bogies: on the front bogie of both units under the driver's cab entrance on both sides, and on the rear bogie of the booster unit for servicing the cranes during LNG refueling — two ladders on the left and one on the right.

The intermediate frame rests on the frames of the two-axle bogies through four pendulum suspensions (two on each side), located at its edges and passing through it. The pendulum suspension consists of a vertical rod oscillating in the transverse direction, with upper and lower support heads. The overall intermediate frame rests on the lower head, while the edges of the upper head rest on the frame of the two-axle bogie. The suspension allows the intermediate frame to deflect relative to the two-axle bogie frame with an amplitude of 40 mm (1.6 in) in the transverse direction on each side, of which, in the first half of the amplitude, the suspension swings freely, and in the next, it is spring-loaded by a lateral stop, creating a restoring force.

In the second stage of suspension, the body rests on the intermediate frame of each bogie through four spring-roller support mechanisms. Each support includes two spring sets, between which and the body frame a plate with roller supports is installed, allowing the four-axle bogie to pivot relative to the body in curves. The spring sets of each support are installed diagonally to the longitudinal direction in the shape of "/\". One of them is located deep near the central base of the body frame, close to a similar set of the other pair, and the other is near the edge of the frame at some distance from the center. Each spring set consists of three twisted cylindrical springs with a common center, having a static deflection of 120 mm (4.7 in). At the front and rear of each external spring assembly, telescopic piston hydraulic dampers of double-acting type are installed at an angle, with two dampers per spring assembly, serving to reduce the impact of the gas-turbine locomotive on the track in the vertical direction and connecting the roller support plate with the bogie frame. To dampen horizontal oscillations between the two-axle bogies and the car body frame, a plate damper is installed, consisting of friction elements and four steel plates arranged one above the other, two of which are wide and triangular in shape, and one narrow rectangular plate positioned above and below them. Additionally, above the outer two-axle bogies, between them and the car body frame, two pneumatic load boosters are installed, which, due to compressed air, increase the load on the leading bogie of the unit in the direction of movement, thereby improving wheel adhesion to the rails when the locomotive is accelerating; after reaching a speed of 10 km/h (6.2 mph), the air is automatically released.

In the primary suspension stage, the frame of each two-axle bogie rests on the brackets of four wheelsets through eight spring assemblies, two per wheelset, and has an individual suspension for each axle box unit of the wheel pair. Each of the four wheelsets of the bogie has two brackets, one of which extends sideways on the outside and downwards and sideways on the inside. Each bracket supports a spring assembly consisting of two co-axial helical cylindrical springs with a common center. The spring assemblies are of equal length but positioned at different heights, with the springs on the inner side of the two-axle bogie located lower than those on its outer side. The static deflection of the springs is 56 mm (2.2 in), while the equivalent deflection, taking into account the stiffness of the journal boxes' links, is 44 mm (1.7 in). Two links—upper and lower—are used to transmit traction and braking forces from the journal box to the bogie frame and to maintain it in a stable position. The links are hinged to the downward-extending brackets of the bogie frame. On the side of the bogie end, the link is positioned under the spring assembly, at the same level as the support bracket of the last spring, below the axle of the journal box; on the side of the bogie center, it is above the spring assembly, above the axis of the journal box.

Traction and braking forces from the two-axle bogies to the frame of the four-axle bogie are transmitted through a lever mechanism for transferring traction force, located between the two-axle bogies under the central cross beam of the intermediate frame of the four-axle bogie. The traction mechanism of each two-axle bogie consists of two double-arm pivot levers mounted on the brackets of the end beams of the two-axle bogies near their edge, short longitudinal inclined rods connecting them to the lower cast brackets of the central beam of the intermediate frame, and a transverse telescopic elastic rod connecting the pivot levers on both sides to ensure their synchronous rotation when negotiating curves and to reduce the load on the bogie frames. To ensure mobility, the rods are connected to the frame of the intermediate bogie and to the levers via ball bearings, while the pivoting levers with the frames of the two-axle bogies are connected via shafts. The short rods are positioned both at a slight upward incline from the two-axle bogie to the intermediate frame, and at a slight diagonal angle relative to the longitudinal direction: on the side of one of the bogies, the distance between the rods converges, while on the side of the other, it diverges from the two-axle bogie to the intermediate frame. The elastic transverse rod is equipped with a spring with a stiffness of 200 kg/mm, preloaded with a force of 30 kN (6,700 lbf), and has a travel of 16 mm (0.63 in) in both tension and compression.

The two-axle bogie has two wheel-motor units. A wheel-motor unit consists of an axle, two axleboxes, two wheels, a single gearbox assembly, a traction electric motor, and its suspension system. The traction electric motors are located in the space between the central beam of the bogie and are slightly offset to the right side of the wheelset relative to the near edge of the bogie. The motors have axle-supported suspension, rigidly resting on the axle via support lugs and motor-axle bearings, and elastically — on the central beam of the two-axle bogie through a spring set. Drive from the motors is transmitted individually to each axle through the gear wheels of the gearbox, mounted on the motor shaft and axle of the wheelset to the right of the motor between it and the running wheel. The running wheels are solid and equipped with tires pressed onto them in a heated state. The diameter of the wheels with new tires along the rolling circle is 1,050 mm (3 ft 5 in), the distance between the inner ends of the tires is 1,440 mm (4 ft 9 in).

The brake system of each two-axle bogie consists of two pneumatic brake cylinders, a lever transmission, and the brake shoes actuated by it. On the front two-axle bogie under the driver's cab, the lever transmission, in addition to the pneumatic brake cylinder, is also equipped with a hand brake drive, consisting of a balance beam and its own system of linkages closer to the center of the bogie. Each wheel is equipped with two brake shoes, clamping it from both sides while braking. The brake cylinders are mounted on the side of the frame of the two-axle bogie on both sides at an angle closer to the edge of the overall four-axle bogie. The lever mechanism consists of rotating levers, hangers, and rods shaped as bars and arcs. While braking, compressed air in the brake cylinder moves the piston with an inclined rod, simultaneously compressing a spring inside the cylinder, which returns the piston to the released position when there is no air in the cylinder. While braking, the rod turns the end lever, which transmits force to the connected levers, and they move two arched longitudinal rods, connected at the center by a straight rod, and the levers actuated by these rods press the brake pads.

=== Interior ===
==== Driver's cab ====
The driver's cab is located at the front of each locomotive unit and is designed to be operated by a crew of two people. The driver's workstation is located on the right side of the cab, while the assistant driver's seat is on the left. The cab of the first locomotive, in terms of layout, finish, and control panel design, is standardized with the cabs of 2TE25K and 2TE25A series diesel locomotives, whereas the cab of the second locomotive is standardized with the cab of the 2ES6 electric locomotives, except for some of the control panel instruments.

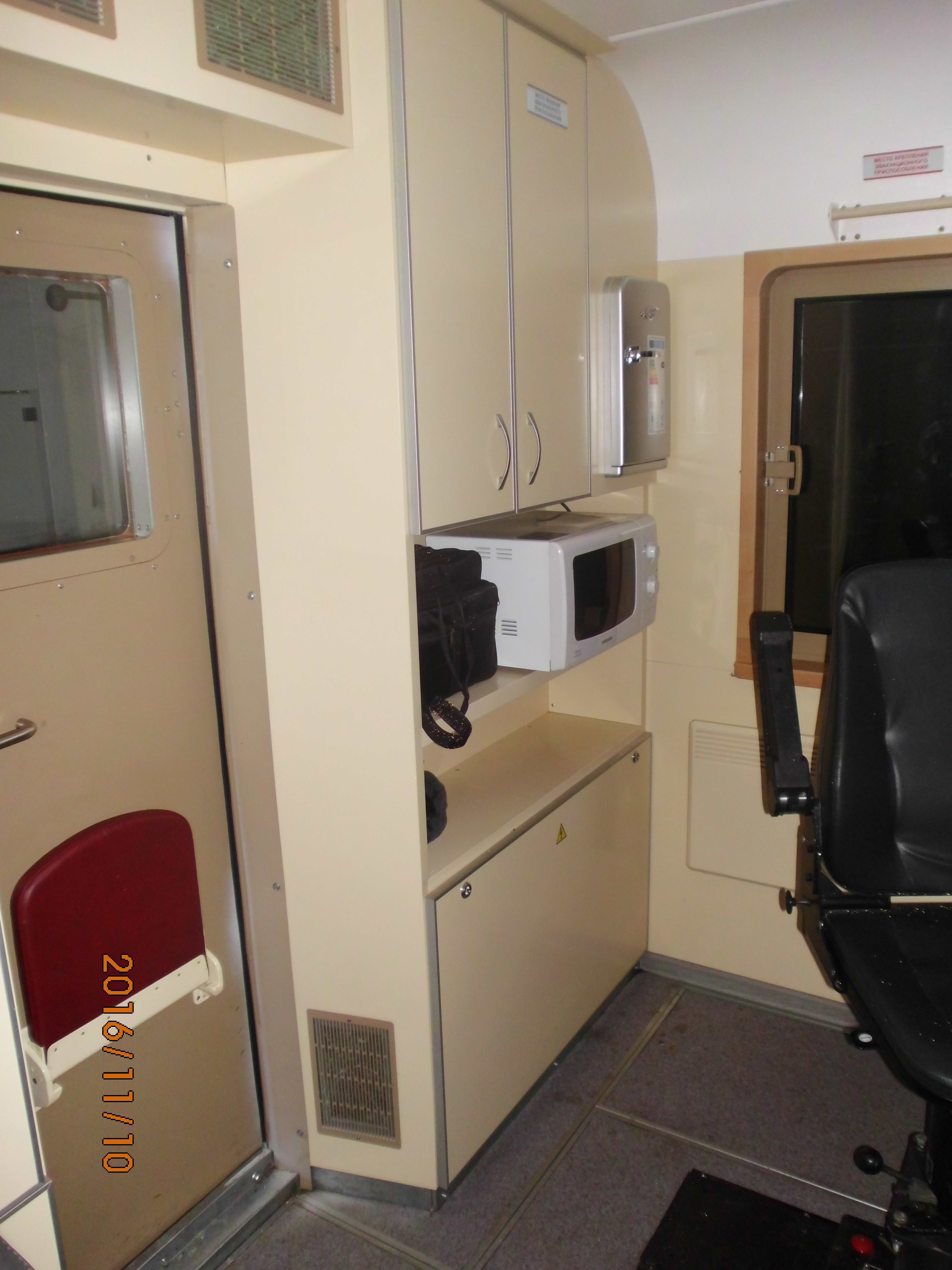
Interior of the rear wall of the 2ES6 electric locomotive cab, similar to the GT1h-002 gas-turbine locomotive

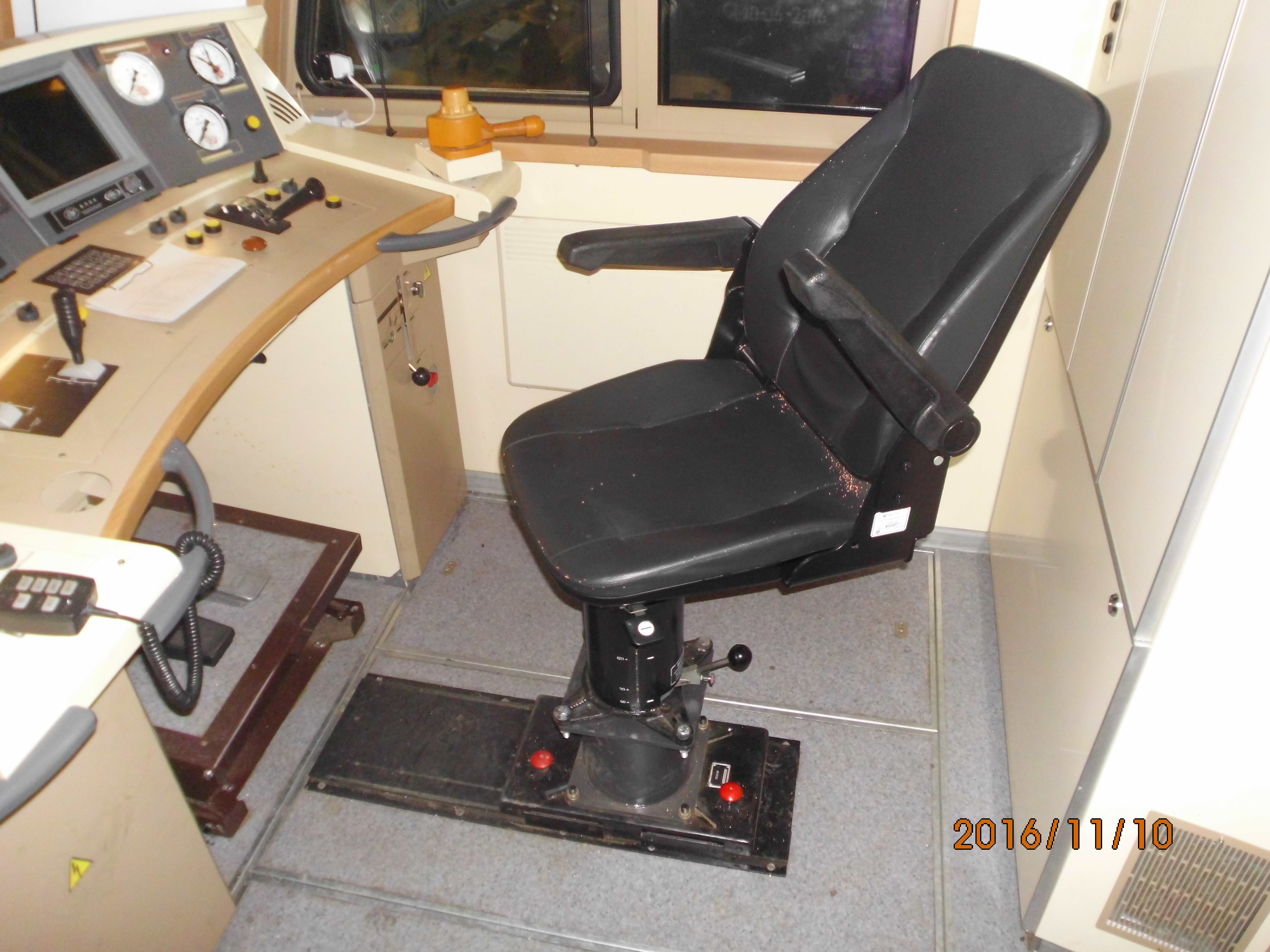
The chair, floor, and part of the driver's control panel in the cab of the 2ES6 electric locomotive, similar to those in the GT1h-002 gas turbine locomotive, except for the panel instruments

At the front of the cab, there is a control panel on three pedestals, opposite which the driver’s and assistant’s seats are installed, and in front of them under the control panel are slanted foot panels. The seats have soft black leather upholstery, adjustable seat height and backrest inclination, as well as armrests. In the second type of the locomotive, the seats are equipped with headrests separate from the backrest. In the rear wall of the cab, in the center, there is an entrance door to which an additional folding seat for the driver-instructor is attached. On either side of it, there are cabinets for clothing, storage of signaling equipment and personal protective equipment, and placement of certain instruments. In the second type of the locomotive, a refrigerator for storing food and a microwave oven for heating it are built into the rear left wall of the cab behind the assistant driver’s seat, while in the first type of the locomotive, the refrigerator is built into the central pedestal of the control panel.

The walls and ceiling of the cab are made of plastic panels. In the first locomotive, the walls and ceiling are milky white, the floor is dark gray, and the control panel is gray. In the second locomotive, the front wall and ceiling are white, while the other walls and the control panel are a combination of light beige and ochre, and the floor is gray with light speckles, similar to the cabs of 2ES6 locomotives. The cab's front windows are equipped with windshield wipers with washers and integrated electric heating. To prevent glare for the locomotive crew in bright sunlight, downward-folding sunshades are installed over the front and side windows. The rear pair of side windows is equipped with sliding ventilation windows — in the first locomotive, they slide downward, while in the second, they slide forward. The side windows that open from the bottom have windowsills.

The cab is equipped with an electric heating system and an air system for heating, air conditioning, and ventilation, with the supply air distributed to the windshield, side windows, and the feet of the locomotive crew. The second-type locomotive also has electric heaters under the side windows.

The cab is equipped with a safety system that includes the comprehensive locomotive safety device KLUB-U on the first or BLOK on the second locomotive, the driver vigilance control telemechanics system TSKBM, a video surveillance system, and a fire alarm system.

===== Control panel of the first locomotive =====
External images
- Driver's control panel GT1h-001, side view
- GT1h-001 driver control panel, front view
- Driver assistant control panel GT1h-001, side view

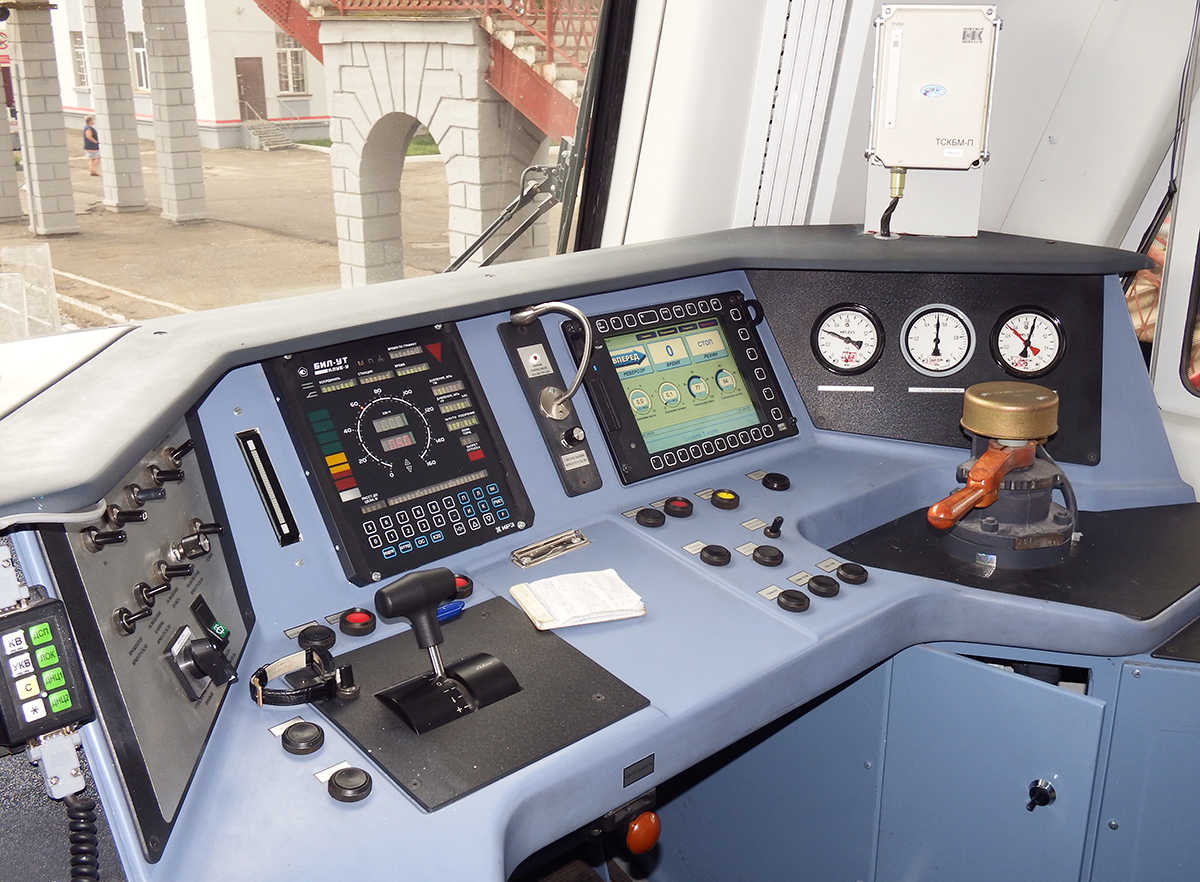
Control panel of the 2TE25K^{M} locomotive, almost identical to the control panel of the GT1h-001 gas turbine locomotive

The control panel of the first type locomotive is standardized in design with the control panels of the TE25 series locomotives and consists of a tabletop mounted on three pedestals: left, central, and right. The left and right pedestals are narrow, while the central pedestal is wide and projects forward closer to the seats. Electrical equipment is housed in the left and central pedestals, while the right pedestal contains elements of the pneumatic system. On the front side of the central pedestal, at the top, there is a panel with circuit breakers, and below it, there is space for placing a refrigerator.

The control panel countertop has a metal frame and is externally covered with plastic panels, on which monitoring instruments and control devices are located. It consists of two zones — a horizontal flat section and an inclined section formed by several panels placed at an angle to each other. The horizontal zone houses the main instruments and control buttons for the locomotive, while the inclined zone contains instruments for monitoring the condition of its systems and some switches. The horizontal part features trapezoidal cutouts opposite the workstations of the driver and assistant, allowing for the placement of controls on the sides in close proximity to them. The console panels are smooth and have no recesses, seams, or gaps, which facilitates their cleaning and enhances the convenience of the locomotive crew's work.

In the driver's working area, all the main control elements and monitoring instruments are located on the right side. On the horizontal desk in front of the driver, on the left, there is a controller handle for setting the travel speed, two reverse buttons labeled "Forward" and "Back" with a key slot to the left of them, and two buttons for startup and turning off the gas turbine engine placed in front of it. On the right side of the desk in front of the driver, there are buttons for releasing the brakes, activating the air horn and whistle, supplying sand, and a red emergency brake button. In the center, there is an empty area with a mount for route and track sheets. To the right above the right panel, in small recesses, there are two pneumatic brake valves with rotary handles — the main train brake valve No. 395 and the auxiliary locomotive brake valve No. 215, which rotate in a horizontal plane. Below, on the end of the tabletop under the controller, there is a driver vigilance control button, and to the right under the tabletop, there are two electrical outlets.

The upper slanted part of the control panel in front of the driver is divided into three panels — two corner panels on the sides and one central panel. The left panel houses toggle switches and controls for the heating, ventilation, windshield washer, and lighting systems. On the central panel, the left side features the KLUB-U safety system display with an integrated speedometer, a signal indication unit for locomotive signaling, and control buttons, while the right side contains the multifunction display of the onboard computer for the locomotive’s control and diagnostic system. The right panel has three horizontally arranged pressure gauges of the pneumatic system for monitoring air pressure in the brake cylinders, equalizing reservoir, and in the brake and supply pneumatic lines. On the left side of the slanted panel, between the driver’s and assistant’s workstations, a radio station is installed.

In the assistant driver’s work area, on the horizontal countertop in front of it, an auxiliary monitor of the video surveillance system and a radio station are placed on the left, and on the slanted panel of the console on the right — buttons for turning on the horn and whistle, the speedometer of the KLUB-U system, a cassette registration slot, switches for turning on the lighting and windshield washer, and a signal indication unit of the locomotive signaling system. On the edge of the countertop to the left, as with the driver, there is a vigilance control button.

===== Control panel of the second locomotive =====
External images
- GT1h-002 Driver's Control Panel
- Central part of the GT1h-002 control panel
- Control Panel of the GT1h-002 Assistant Driver

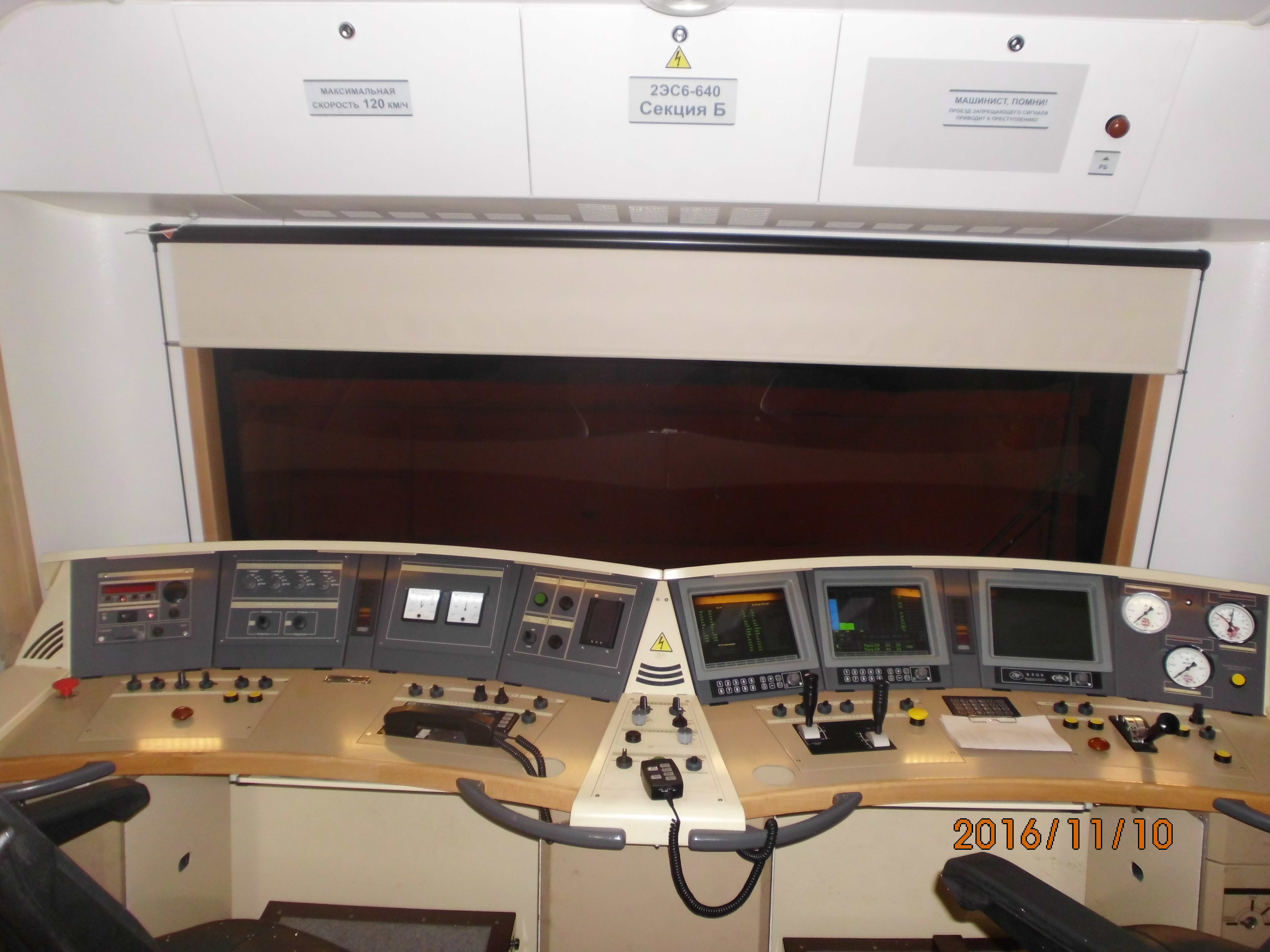
Control panel of the 2ES6 locomotive, similar to the control panel of the GT1h-002 gas turbine locomotive

The control panel of the second type locomotive is based on the control panel of the 2ES6 electric locomotive, but with fewer monitors and partially different control instruments, and consists of a tabletop mounted on three pedestals: left, middle, and right. Compared to the first type locomotive, all three pedestals are narrow and protrude approximately the same distance.

The control panel countertop has a metal frame and is covered on the outside with plastic panels, on which monitoring instruments and control devices are located. The console, as in the locomotive of the first type, consists of two zones — a horizontal flat zone and an inclined zone formed by several panels set at angles to each other. The horizontal zone accommodates the main instruments and locomotive control buttons, while the inclined zone houses systems monitoring instruments and some switches. The cutouts opposite the workstations of the driver and assistant have a smooth curved shape and are furnished with edging along the edges, with curved handrails installed at their corners. Compared to the control panel of the first type locomotive, in the second type locomotive the sections of the panel for the driver and the assistant are of the same size and shape, and the inclined panels have a smaller curvature, lack sharp angles, and are shaped in a way that approximates an arc. At the edges of the workstations and between them in the inclined part of the panel, a triangular panel expanding downward is installed, and in the horizontal middle of the panel, a trapezoidal panel continuing it is installed.

In the driver's working area, all the main control units and monitoring instruments are located on the right side. On the horizontal part of the console in front of the driver, to the left, there is a controller handle for setting the travel speed, to its left — the reversing switch and the key slot, and to the right — the booster switch. To the right on the desk in front of the driver, there is a compact handle of the remote brake valve No. 130 in black color, which rotates forward and backward in the vertical plane, with buttons on the sides for releasing brakes, activating the horn and whistle, sand supply, driver vigilance control, and emergency braking. Further to the right, above the right pedestal on a small elevation, there is the pneumatic valve of the auxiliary locomotive brake No. 215, which rotates in the horizontal plane. In the center, there is a keyboard and a desk with a mount for waybills and other documents.

On the upper inclined part of the driver's console on the left, there is a power plant control panel, on which at the top are the cooling and cranking buttons and the toggle switch for startup and turnoff the gas turbine engine, and at the bottom — the auxiliary generator switch, the toggle switch for turning the auxiliary systems on and off, and the charging switch for the traction batteries at idle. In the central left part, there is a display of the onboard computer of the locomotive control and diagnostic system, on the right — a display of the safety and signaling system BLOK, and between them — the locomotive signaling indicator block. On the right, there is a panel with three pneumatic pressure gauges, two of which are located at the top, and one in the center at the bottom, used for monitoring the air pressure in the brake cylinders, in the equalizing reservoir, and in the brake and main lines.

In the driver's assistant's working area, on the horizontal tabletop in front of it, a button panel with toggles and switches for cab heating and ventilation system and mirror heating, as well as buttons for the horn and whistle and a vigilance control button, is located on the left. In the center, there is an empty area with a mount for route and way bills. On the right, a radio station with a handset and a row of switches is installed. On the inclined panel, the fire alarm control panel is located on the left, the locomotive signaling indication unit and multifunctional onboard computer display are in the center, and the registration cassette slot is on the right.

On the horizontal narrow panel between the driver’s and assistant’s workstations, the driver’s radio station is installed, as well as toggles and switches for the heating, windshield washer, and lighting systems.

==== Engine compartments ====
External images
- Layout diagram of the GT1h-002 locomotive equipment
- High-voltage chamber in GT1h-001
- Toilet in GT1h-002

Most of the interior space of the locomotives is occupied by engine compartments, located in the main part of the body behind the driver's cab and divided by partitions into several zones. The walls inside the engine compartments of the first locomotive are painted gray, and those of the second locomotive are painted light green. The rooms are equipped with lighting lamps, video surveillance systems, automatic fire extinguishing systems, gas leak monitoring sensors, and an automatic ventilation system near the gas equipment.

In the traction-energy unit, directly behind the driver's cab, there is a vestibule with entrance doors, behind which is a combined equipment room. On the rear exterior wall of the control cab in the vestibule, various devices are located, including an information processing device, a brake equipment module, and units of the train remote distributed brake control system, units of the Safety Locomotive Combined Complex (BLOK) in the second type locomotive, radio station units, and elements of the fire alarm and automatic fire extinguishing system. In the center of the wall, there is a door providing entry to the cab. In the second type locomotive, on the left in front of the driver's cab wall, there is a toilet room with a portable bio-toilet, equipped with a power outlet and an electric heater.

Behind the vestibule in the equipment room are traction converters with an external cooling system, current regulators, auxiliary converters, an equipment cabinet, and other electrical apparatus, some of which is located in a special high-voltage chamber. The passage through the equipment room in both locomotives is arranged along the right side.

In the first type of the locomotive, at the front of the equipment compartment, directly behind the vestibule, in the middle and near the left side, there is a high-voltage chamber separated by semi-transparent walls made of vertical and horizontal slats. The high-voltage chamber contains exposed electrical contacts, so people are not allowed to be inside it while the locomotive is in operation. Therefore, the entrance door is equipped with an interlocking device and a disconnect switch that de-energizes the electrical circuits when the door is opened. Immediately behind it, in the center near the rear partition, is the main motor-fan of the centralized air supply system, arranged as a vertical cylindrical stand.

In the second type of the locomotive, an equipment cabinet is located immediately behind the vestibule in the center; behind it are the hand brake column on the right and the main motor-fan in the center, while the high-voltage chamber is positioned at the rear and is designed as a large modular frame-type cabinet with solid walls. Some electrical equipment is also placed outside the high-voltage chamber in cabinets along the walls. Under the roof, there are two hoppers for the front sandboxes, loaded through roof hatches (in the second type of the locomotive, they are located above the vestibule doors), and a dust extraction fan from the multicyclone filters of the CVS fan.

Behind the equipment room, separated by a partition with a door near the starboard side, is the main engine compartment. It houses generators, and behind them is a gas-turbine power plant with intake and exhaust air chambers and heat exchangers. In the rear part of the engine compartment, on the right side, there is a compressor module consisting of two screw compressors arranged one above the other, while on the left side there is a gas receiver and other gas treatment equipment. In the rear part of the engine compartment is the electrical equipment of the gas equipment control system, including a power supply unit, a converter, and a gas dosing controller. Under the rear part of the roof, internal fire suppression system elements and a pneumatic system rack are installed. In the first type of the locomotive, a hand brake is also located in the rear unit.

In the booster unit, directly behind the control cab, there is a vestibule and an auxiliary equipment room combined with it. In the front part of the vestibule, as in the traction-power unit, there is an entrance door to the control cab in the middle of the partition, and to the left of it, the second type of the locomotive also has a restroom. The equipment room contains an equipment cabinet and static converters. At the rear of the room in the first type of the locomotive, a main motor-fan for centralized air supply is installed in the center, similar to the traction section fan, and is used to cool the traction motors and auxiliary equipment. In the second type of the locomotive, this fan is absent in the booster unit equipment room; instead, two fans are located in a box between the bogies. Additionally, a manual brake column is situated in this room. Under the roof, there are two hoppers for the front sandboxes.

In the middle part of the locomotives' booster unit, a cryogenic fuel tank is located across almost the entire width, resting on a mass-measuring device and separated from the front and rear parts of the unit by solid bulkheads without any passage. In the first type of the locomotive, it is located inside the body, whereas in the second type of the locomotive, it is mounted on an open frame. Along the edges of the frame of the second type locomotive, on either side of the fuel tank, are boxes for on-board batteries, filtration units of the ventilation system, and cooling units for traction motors, along with air ducts leading to the fan box.

At the rear part of the booster unit, there is an end room, in the rear end wall of which there is a door at the center for the inter-sectional gangway to the traction-energy unit. In the first type of the locomotive, along the left side of the unit, there are cabinets with electrical equipment, and along the right side, there is a cryogenic pump on the reservoir side and a traction battery on the end wall side (before conversion, a diesel generator with a cooling system occupied this location, taking up half of the unit's width). The walkway with a metal flooring along the rear room of the first locomotive is shifted toward the left side. In the second type of the locomotive, the rear compartment is divided into two parts — the compartment for the cryogenic pump and gas preparation equipment along the left side and the compartment for electrical equipment along the right side, which also houses the fire extinguishing system and the unit's pneumatic system rack.

GT1-001 locomotive equipment layout: 1. driver's cab 2. vestibule of the traction-power unit 3. corridor of the equipment room 4. high-voltage chamber 5. partition with a door 6. engine compartment of the power plant 7. inter-sectional gangway 8. room for the cryogenic pump and diesel generator 9. cryogenic fuel tank compartment 10. vestibule and equipment room of the booster unit 11. Layout of equipment on the first type of the locomotive 12. traction rectifiers 13. CVC motor fans 14. auxiliary generator 15. traction generator 16. inlet air chamber 17. gas turbine engine 18. exhaust gas chamber with a heat exchanger 19. compressor 20. receiver and other gas equipment 21. inter-sectional fuel hoses 22. cryogenic pump 23. adapters and valves for LNG refueling 24. cryogenic fuel tank with LNG 25. auxiliary diesel maneuver 26. auxiliary diesel generator 27. electrical equipment of the booster unit

=== Cryogenic fuel system ===
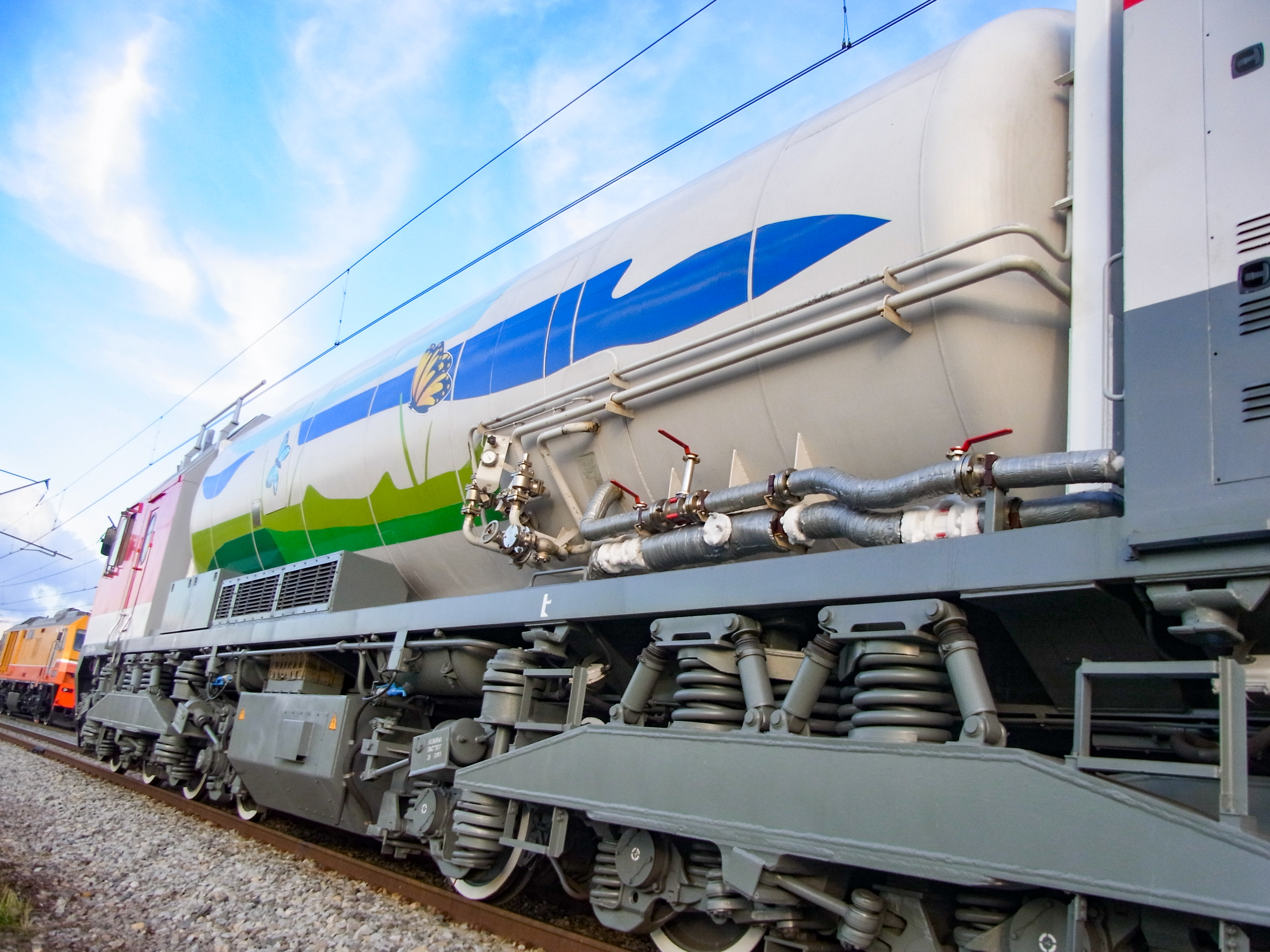
Cryogenic fuel tank of the GT1h-002 locomotive. Valves, pressure gauges, and refueling hose adapters are visible.

The fuel system of GT1 locomotives in the booster unit consists of a cryogenic tank for liquefied natural gas (LNG), a high-pressure piston cryogenic pump, and pipelines, while in the traction-power unit it consists of pipelines, heat exchangers, a mixer, a receiver, and a gas dispenser. From the booster unit, the liquefied gas is pumped through special flexible inter-sectional pipelines into the traction-power unit, where it passes through fuel-oil and fuel-gas heat exchangers, thereby heating up and gasifying the liquefied gas, after which it enters the receiver in the form of a 2 m^{3} (71 ft^{3}) tank that serves to compensate for gas expansion due to heating, and from it through the gas dispenser and shut-off valve, the gas is supplied to the combustion chamber injectors of the gas-turbine engine.

The fuel tank, in the form of a cryogenic cistern, is located in the middle of the booster unit of the gas-turbine locomotive and is designed to hold 17 t (37,000 lb) of liquefied gas on the first type the locomotive and 20 t (44,000 lb) on the second type. The liquefied gas is stored at a temperature below −161 °C (−258 °F) with an operating pressure of 4.5 atmospheres, and a maximum allowable pressure of up to 6 atmospheres is considered. For refueling the fuel tank, special valves and adapters for refueling hoses are mounted on its side. On the first type of the locomotive, these are covered by a removable sidewall cover and are located on the starboard side of the unit, while on the second type of the locomotive, they are located on the port side of the unit in an open space closer to the rear.

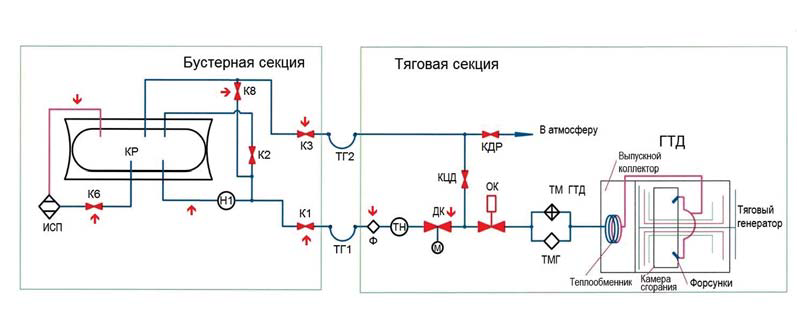
Diagram of the initial fuel system of the GT1-001 locomotive with single-circuit liquid control

Initially, the fuel system of the first type locomotive featured two consecutive centrifugal pumps on the booster and traction-power units and liquid fuel flow regulation, by analogy with the fuel system of the experimental Tu-155 aircraft. In this scheme, the fuel meter was installed in the liquid line immediately after the pump, and a gas receiver was absent. However, shortly after the start of trial operation, this fuel supply scheme revealed a delay in the gasification process in the heat exchangers, causing the engine to operate unstably and sometimes, in terms of rotational speed and power, to fall out of phase with the fuel supply rate, which led to a shortfall or surplus of the power output relative to the required amount and resulted in increased fuel consumption. This problem had not previously manifested in the Tu-155 aircraft operating on liquefied gas or in gas-turbine power plants, because in those cases the engine operated most of the time at nominal power, and the fuel consumption rate was approximately constant, whereas on a locomotive, due to constant acceleration and braking, the gas-turbine engine operated under variable conditions and required much more precise and rapid fuel supply regulation.

Other disadvantages of the initial system included the need for prolonged system cooling before startup and the formation of a solid fraction of carbon dioxide and other impurities due to the long lengths of pipelines and the necessity to vent part of the gasified methane into the atmosphere. When the liquefied gas moved through pipelines and fittings, a drop in static pressure below the methane vapor pressure was observed, causing the methane to gasify, and the concentration of carbon dioxide exceeded its solubility limit at the current temperature. As a result, carbon dioxide, which has a higher transition temperature to the solid state than methane to the liquid state, precipitated as dry ice both in the fittings and when returning natural gas to the storage cushion in “cold” pipelines. This led to multiple failures – pump cavitation and/or blockages, requiring subsequent reheating and system restart over a period of one and a half to two hours.

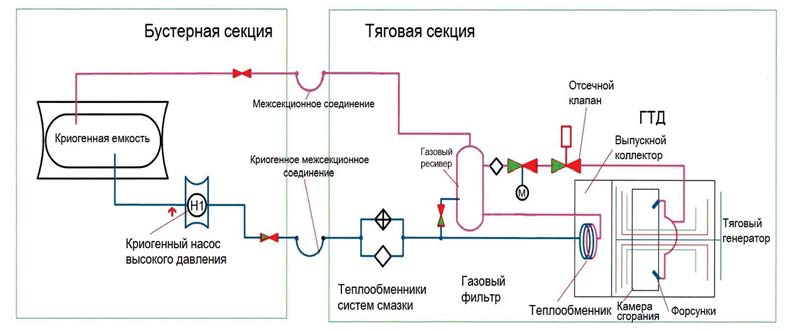
Diagram of the modernized fuel system of the GT1h-001 locomotive with dual-circuit liquid and gas control

In 2010, the fuel system on the first type locomotive was radically modernized: a high-pressure piston pump was installed instead of a centrifugal pump, a gas dispenser was installed directly in front of the gas-turbine engine instead of a liquid fuel metering device, a receiver for accumulating gaseous fractions under pressure was installed after the heat exchangers, and one of the inter-sectional connections began to be used for supplying gaseous fractions from the fuel tank to the traction-section receiver. Additionally, the length of pipelines was reduced, and the amount of equipment requiring cooling was minimized. At the same time, two fuel supply control circuits were introduced — in the primary circuit, the supply of liquefied gas to the receiver was regulated according to its pressure by changing the pump rotation speed, and in the secondary circuit, the gas dispenser regulated the supply of gas from the receiver directly to the engine. This system made it possible both to accumulate gasified methane in the receiver for the gas turbine engine instead of releasing it into the atmosphere and to prevent an increase in the concentration of impurities, as well as to remove the heat exchangers from the fuel supply control circuit to the engine, eliminating issues with the regulator’s response speed and the stability of the gas supply system in the gas-turbine operating mode. During the testing of the new fuel system, additional valves were installed, and new control algorithms were developed for operation in automatic mode.

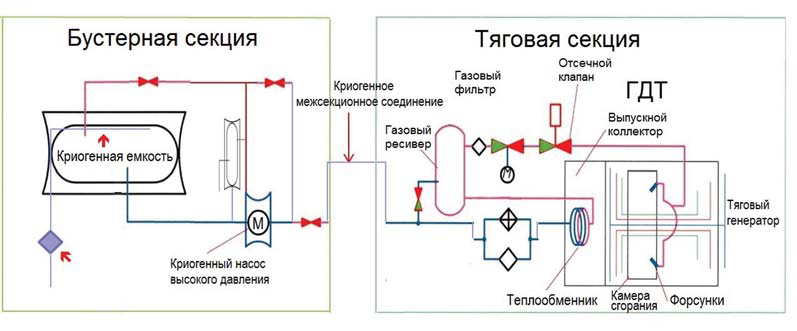
Fuel system diagram of the GT1h-002 locomotive

On the second type locomotive, taking into account the operational results of the first, a similar version of the fuel system was applied, which had a number of differences. In addition to the open placement of the main cryogenic tank and part of the gas equipment, a buffer cryogenic tank was introduced between the main tank and the fuel pump. Instead of two flexible inter-sectional hoses for the gas and liquid fractions, a single common pipeline made of three flexible tubes is used, having a U-shaped profile from the front and a /-shaped profile from the side. The new pipeline is equipped with axial elastic rods, providing flexibility of the pipeline solely through the bending of each element, as this practically does not affect the service life of the corrugated pipelines. In this system, the gaseous fraction of liquefied gas enters under pressure through a valve and mixes with the liquid fraction supplied by the pump, after which, passing through the inter-sectional pipeline, it is separated in the traction-power unit and enters the receiver through a valve.

External image
- ANM-KHA-100.5 type cryogenic pump

Cryogenic piston pumps of Delta N80 type produced by the Swiss company Fives Cryomec, with a maximum capacity of 80 L (21 US gal) of liquefied gas per minute, began to be used on both types of gas turbine carriers. Compared to the centrifugal pump initially used on the first gas turbine carrier, the piston pump required significantly less time for cooldown and could more easily regulate fuel supply, but it had lower performance. During the operation of the gas turbine carriers, it was found that to ensure the gas turbine operates at maximum power, the pump must operate at its limit, which leads to rapid wear. It was also discovered that constant accelerations and vibrations during the operation of the locomotive negatively affect the performance of the pump, which was originally designed for use in stationary conditions and selected for installation on the locomotive as one of the few suitable options. In this regard, in 2016, the Russian company PskovTechGaz developed a more efficient and low-maintenance ANM-KHA-100.5 type cryogenic three-piston pump, which was soon installed on the first type locomotive, replacing the Swiss one. In operation, this pump proved to be more successful, as a result of which its installation as a replacement for the Swiss pump on the second gas turbine locomotive also began to be considered.

Heat exchangers are used for heating and gasifying liquefied gas and cooling power machines. During the operation of a gas-turbine engine, liquefied gas first passes through fuel-oil heat exchangers, thereby cooling the oil used to cool the gas turbine and generator, and then through a fuel-gas heat exchanger in the exhaust pipe, where its main heating and gasification occur due to exhaust gases. However, before starting the gas-turbine engine, this heat source is absent and oil cooling is not required, so before starting the engine, fuel is supplied through a throttle valve directly to the mixer, bypassing the heat exchangers. For initial heating of the fuel in the mixer and to prevent liquid fractions from entering the receiver, a 2.7 kW flexible heating cable powered by the battery is used. The heating of the mixer is switched on during preparation for startup and switched off after the gas turbine engine starts. When gas is supplied to the engine combustion chamber, the throttle valve of the mixer closes, and all LNG passes through the fuel-oil heat exchangers. Until the gas turbine start-up is completed, the gasified methane entering the receiver from the main fuel-gas heat exchanger is additionally heated in the mixer. A K13 valve is installed between the outlet of the fuel-oil heat exchangers and the inlet of the fuel-gas heat exchanger, which prevents the oil from freezing during the preliminary filling of the receiver and opens at start-up before fuel is supplied to the engine. Initially, starts with a “frozen” engine oil heat exchanger caused the engine oil temperature to rise to dangerous levels. This phenomenon was not observed in the generator’s oil heat exchanger, as oil was circulated through it even before start-up.

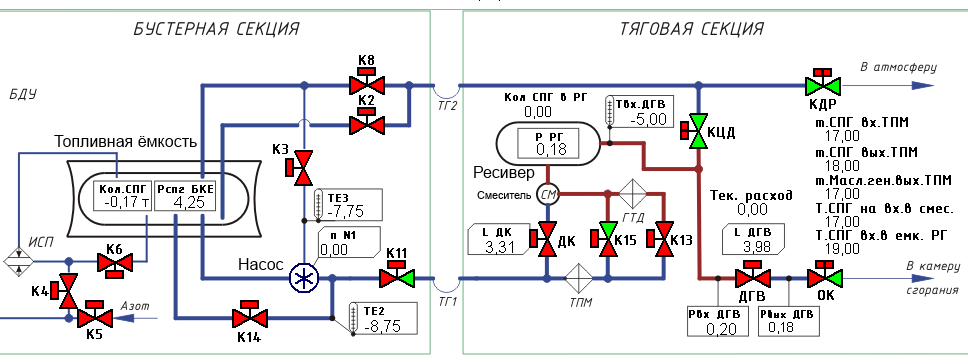
Fuel system diagram of the GT1h-001 locomotive indicating the valves

Preparation for start-up begins with opening the throttle valve in front of the mixer and supplying gas from the cryogenic tank cushion to the receiver through valves K8 and KCD. Simultaneously with opening valve K3, the cryogenic pump starts cooling down. After the pressure in the cryogenic tank and the receiver equalizes (0.35 — 0.45 MPa), K14 is opened, and the cryogenic pump is set to minimum rotation speed. Once the pressure in the receiver reaches 1.2 MPa, the pump stops, K14 is closed, and the engine starter is activated. As the engine rotors are spun up by the starter, the pressure in the receiver continues to increase due to the gasification of methane in the mixer. Five seconds before fuel is supplied to the engine combustion chamber, the pump is switched on again at minimum rotation speed. To quickly fill the receiver during increased fuel consumption at engine start-up, valve K14 remains closed. Simultaneously with the pump activation, K13 and K15 open, and the throttle valve closes after five seconds — when fuel is supplied to the engine. After the pressure in the receiver reaches 1.6 MPa, K14 opens, and the receiver pressure regulator becomes operational. The start-up process, from pump cooldown, receiver filling, to reaching idle mode, does not exceed 8 minutes.

To limit the maximum gas temperature according to the operating conditions of the gas doser, a valve K15 with a throttle is installed parallel to the fuel-gas heat exchanger and valve K13. Valve K15 is open at low modes when the gas temperature after the fuel-gas heat exchanger without bypass may exceed 120 °C (248 °F) - the maximum allowable temperature for the gas doser. To prevent oil from freezing in the fuel-oil heat exchanger during startup, K15 opens simultaneously with K13. Since the permissible minimum pump flow is higher than the engine's required flow at idle, a bypass from the pump outlet to the cryogenic tank is provided through valve K14 and a throttle. At idle and low modes, K14 is open. When the generator reaches a power output of 2,500 kW (3,400 hp), valves K14 and K15 close.

The pressure in the receiver is maintained by changing the rotational speed of the cryogenic pump. For optimal gas dispenser operation, the regulator setting is smoothly increased from 1.6 MPa at idle to 3 MPa at maximum power. Since the regulation of flow takes into account changes in the pressure and temperature of the gas before the dispenser, no strict requirements are imposed on the receiver pressure regulator, as was the case in the original system. Pressure fluctuations in the receiver do not affect the operation of the engine control system. Before shutdown, during engine cooling at idle, the cryogenic pump is switched to minimum speed. At the same time, the pressure in the receiver decreases to 0.5–0.8 MPa. This shutdown algorithm minimizes the amount of gas in the receiver when the engine is not running. The gas reserve in the receiver, the thermal inertia of the heat exchangers, and the oil systems make it possible for the engine to operate and for the oil to be cooled for some time in the event of a cryogenic pump failure. In such an abnormal situation, switching the engine to idle mode, its cooling, and shutdown are not accompanied by a dangerous increase in oil temperatures in the gas-turbine engine and generator.

=== Traction and power equipment ===
==== Gas-turbine engine ====
- Gas turbine

As the power plant of the GTE-8.3/NK turbogenerator power unit on the locomotive, a two-shaft NK-361 gas -turbine engine with a free power turbine is used. The engine was developed by the Samara Scientific and Technical Complex named after N. D. Kuznetsov based on the three-shaft turbojet engines NK-25 and NK-32, which were used on the Tu-22M and Tu-160 supersonic jet aircraft, but it has smaller dimensions and power.

The gas-turbine engine is mounted on a special frame behind the generators it drives, which are located on the same frame. During operation, it rotates clockwise relative to the direction from the cockpit backward. It consists of low- and high-pressure air turbocompressors, a combustion chamber, and high- and low-pressure power turbines, connected by shafts located on the same axis with the turbocompressors. The turbocompressors are located at the front part of the section, while the power turbines are at the rear. In front of the engine is the air intake chamber, from which atmospheric air is drawn into the engine through the intake scroll and compressed by the rotating blades of the turbocompressors, which increase its pressure to the operating level. In the combustion chamber, air mixes with the natural gas supplied by the injectors, and the resulting mixture is ignited, which causes it to heat up and expand. The ignited gas, under the pressure generated by the expansion, rotates the blades of the high- and low-pressure power turbines and then enters the exhaust chamber behind the engine, where it is used to heat the liquid methane, after which it is released through a shaft outside via a grille in the locomotive roof. The power turbines transmit torque through shafts to the blades of the turbochargers, and the low-pressure turbine also drives the shaft of the electric generators, which passes through the air intake chamber.

Main parameters of the NK-361 gas turbine-engine
Parameters	Results
Full (maximum) power in kilowatts	8300–8500
Rotation speed of the power turbine output shaft in rpm	3000–6000
Efficiency in percent	27,3–31,5
Losses of the inlet and exhaust volutes in milimeters of water column.	100/300
Total air flow in kilograms per second	46,9–56,5
Total fuel consumption at maximum/idle in kilograms per hour	2202/535
Total oil consumption in kilograms per hour	0,3
Turbocharger compression ratio	11,58
Gas temperature behind the turbine in celsius (kelvin)	593–884 (866–1127)
Gas temperature behind the turbine in celsius (kelvin)	394 (667)
Engine mass with frame and scrolls in kilograms	11 880

==== Electric generators ====
High-speed generators produced by LLC "Electrotyazhmash-Privod" in Lysva are used to convert the mechanical energy of a gas turbine's rotation into electrical energy. These generators are installed in front of the turbine and are driven by it through a shaft without using a gearbox. The GT1h-001 locomotive uses the ATG-7370/600-6000 U2 generator unit, which consists of two generators mounted on a common foundation plate: the traction generator GST 7370-6000-2U2 for powering the traction motors, and the auxiliary generator GSV 600-6000-2U2 for powering auxiliary machinery and the excitation system of the traction generator. The locomotive employs the higher-power generator GST-7500/8150-5400-2U2, which generates electricity to supply both the traction and auxiliary equipment.

The generators are three-phase electrical machines with independent excitation through slip rings and stator windings connected in a star configuration with a neutral point. Traction generators have two stator windings, shifted relative to each other by 30 degrees, with current from each winding supplied through its own channel. The stator windings and rings have F-class insulation, while the rotor winding has H-class insulation. Generator ventilation is forced.

Main parameters of electric generators
Parameters	Results					
Parameters	GST 7370-6000-2U2 (traction GT1h-001)		GSV 600-6000-2U2 (auxiliary GT1h-001)	GST 7500/8150-5400-2U2 (GT1h-002)		
Parameters	hourly	long-term	long-term	long-term		hourly
Power in kilowatts	7370		600	7500	8150	8150
Maximum line voltage in volts	1200		400	623		
Current in ampers	2×2560	2×2390	2×720	2×5550	2×4100	2×5550
At line voltage in volts	925	990	400	416	623	459
Power factor, cos φ, per unit	0,9		0,6	0,92		
Rated rotational speed in rpm (Hz)	6000 (100)			5400 (90)		
Efficiency in percent	96,5		91	97,0		
Excitation current in continuous mode (maximum) in ampers	300		250	290		
Cooling air flow rate in cubic meters	5,5		2	?		
Full cooling air pressure, not exceeding, in pascals	2000			?		
Mass in kilograms	11 050		3170	13 120		
Total mass of the unit in kilograms	17950			13 120		

==== Auxiliary diesel generator ====
External image
- Diesel generator

In the booster unit of the first type locomotive, before it was converted to GT1h, there was an auxiliary SDMO V440K diesel generator from France. It was designed to move the locomotive around and power the electrical circuits when the gas-turbine engine was off, as well as to power the starter when starting the gas-turbine engine. It consists of a four-stroke, six-cylinder, inline Volvo Penta TAD 1344 GE diesel engine from Sweden with a rated power of 400 kW (540 hp) and a three-phase synchronous SDMO electric generator with an output of 320 kW (430 hp) and a nominal line voltage of 400 V. The engine is equipped with an electronic control system, direct fuel injection, a turbocharger, an air-cooled charge air cooler, a liquid cooling system with thermostatic control, and an individual electronic pump-injectors. The engine is started electrically.

Main specifications of the auxiliary diesel generator
Diesel engine
Parameters	Results
Rated/maximum power in kilovolt-ampers	400/440
Rated rotational speed in rpm	1500
Cylinder diameter in milimeters	131
Piston stroke in milimeters	158
Capacity in liters	12,78
Compression ratio	18.1:1
Fuel consumption at 75% load in liters per hour	63.3
Fuel tank capacity in liters (kilograms)	470 (400)
Engine oil capacity with filters in liters	36
Cooling system capacity with radiator in liters	44
Noise level in decibels	70
Filled mass in kilograms	1325
Diesel dimensions	2279×1105×1631
Generator
Parameters	Results
Rated/maximum power in kilowatts	320/352
Phase/line voltage in volts	230/400
Current frequency in herz	50
Mass of diesel with generator in kilograms	3238
Dimensions of the diesel engine with generator in milimeters	3160×1340×1805

== See also ==
- VL15 and VL85 – mainline electric locomotives, based on the design of which the first gas-turbine locomotive GT1 was developed.
- Union Pacific GTELs – North American gas-turbine–electric locomotives used by Union Pacific
