= TE33A =

Class of diesel locomotive

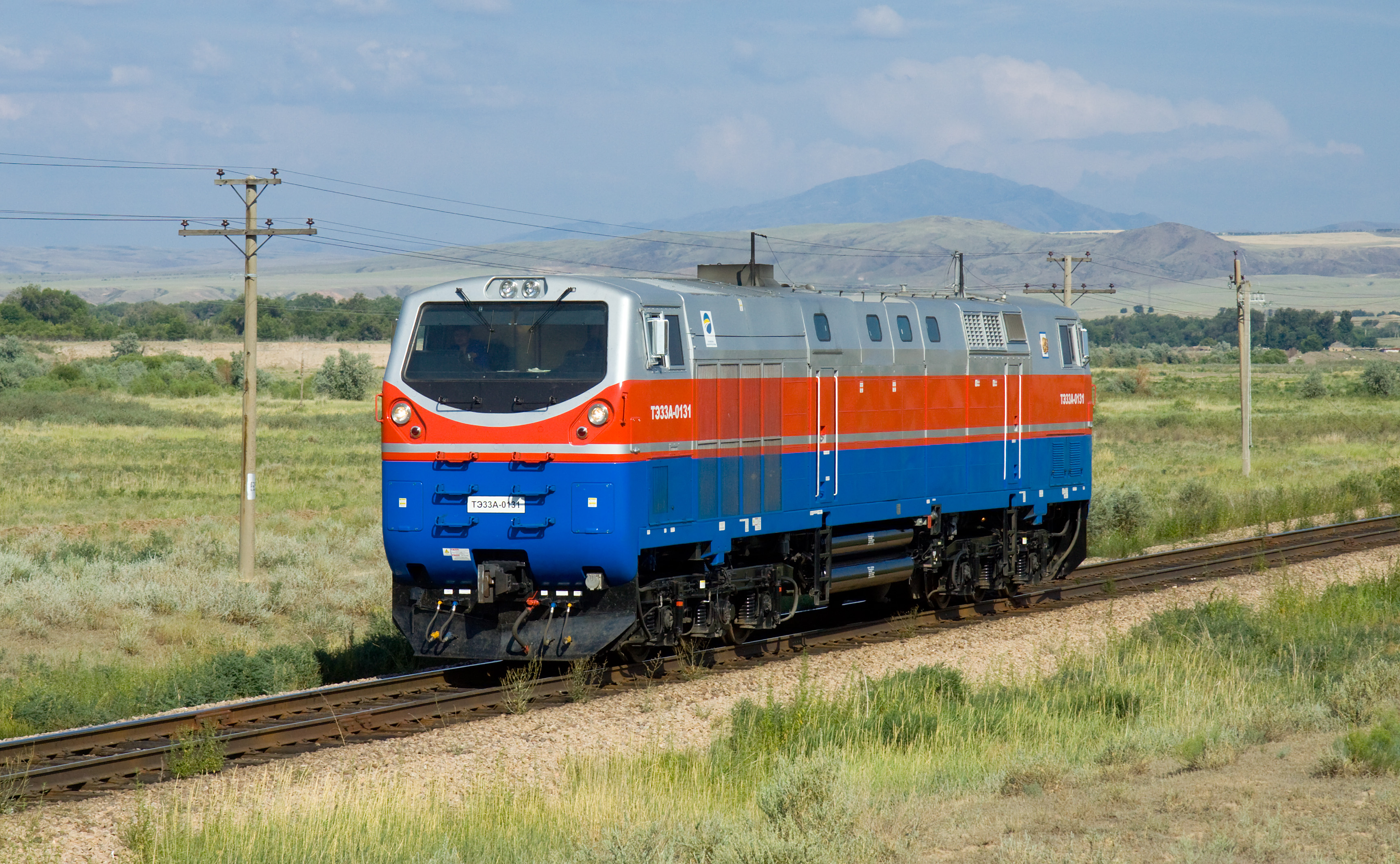
Type and origin
- Power type: Diesel–electric
- Builder: General Electric Transportation, JSC Lokomotiv
- Build date: 2009-present
- Total produced: 310
Specifications
- Configuration
  - UIC: Co-Co
- Gauge: 1,520 mm (4 ft 11 27/32 in)
- Prime mover: GEVO 12-cylinder
- Engine type: Diesel engine
Performance figures
- Maximum speed: 120 km/h (160 km/h for planned passenger version)
Career
- Operators: KTZ, Azerbaijan Railways, Ulaanbaatar Railway, Kyrgyz Railways, Tajikistan, Turkmenistan, Moldovan Railways, Ukrainian Railways

The TE33A (ТЭ33А) is a type of diesel locomotive developed by GE Transportation Systems for 1,520 mm gauge railways. It is part of the GE Evolution Series family.

Following the delivery of an initial 10 locomotives from GE's plant at Erie, Pennsylvania, in the US, TE33A locomotives are being assembled from kits by the JSC Lokomotiv subsidiary of Kazakhstan Temir Zholy at a new factory in Astana which was opened by President Nursultan Nazarbayev on 3 July 2009.

== Specification ==
The TE33A was designed for the 1,520 mm (4 ft 11 27/32 in) Russian gauge market, in particular to replace the 2TE10. Russian GOST Standards and Safety Norms were used in development, and the locomotive is designed to use standard GOST fuel and lubricants.

The locomotives have two cabs, and are among the first diesel–electric locomotives with AC traction motors to operate in the Commonwealth of Independent States (after the 2TE25A built by Bryansk Engineering Works, Transmashholding, Russia).

The TE33A is certified by the UIC to meet EU IIIa emissions standards, and reduce particulate emissions by approximately 75% and NOx emissions by 35% per kilowatt-hour when compared to a 2TE10.

== Orders ==
=== Kazakhstan ===
As of 2025, over 500 TE33A locomotives have been built locally for Kazakhstan Railways (KTZ), with 40 units exported to countries in the region, including Kyrgyzstan, Moldova, Tajikistan, Azerbaijan, Ukraine, Turkmenistan, and Mongolia.

==== Freight locos ====
In September 2006 Kazakhstan Temir Zholy placed a US$650m order for 310 locomotives. The first 10 were built in GE's Erie, Pennsylvania, plant while the remaining 300 are being assembled in Astana.

==== Passenger locos ====
At InnoTrans on 19 September 2012 KTZ ordered 110 locomotives to be delivered from 2014 for use on passenger trains. These will have a higher maximum speed of 160 km/h.

=== Estonia ===
In 2010 Vopak EOS, the owner of Estonian Railway Services, began negotiations to buy TE33A locomotives. A TE33A was sent to Estonia in December 2011 for five months of testing. On 22 May 2013 a contract for 15 locomotives was signed by Vopak EOS. In 2015 the order was reported to have been cancelled.

=== Kyrgyzstan ===
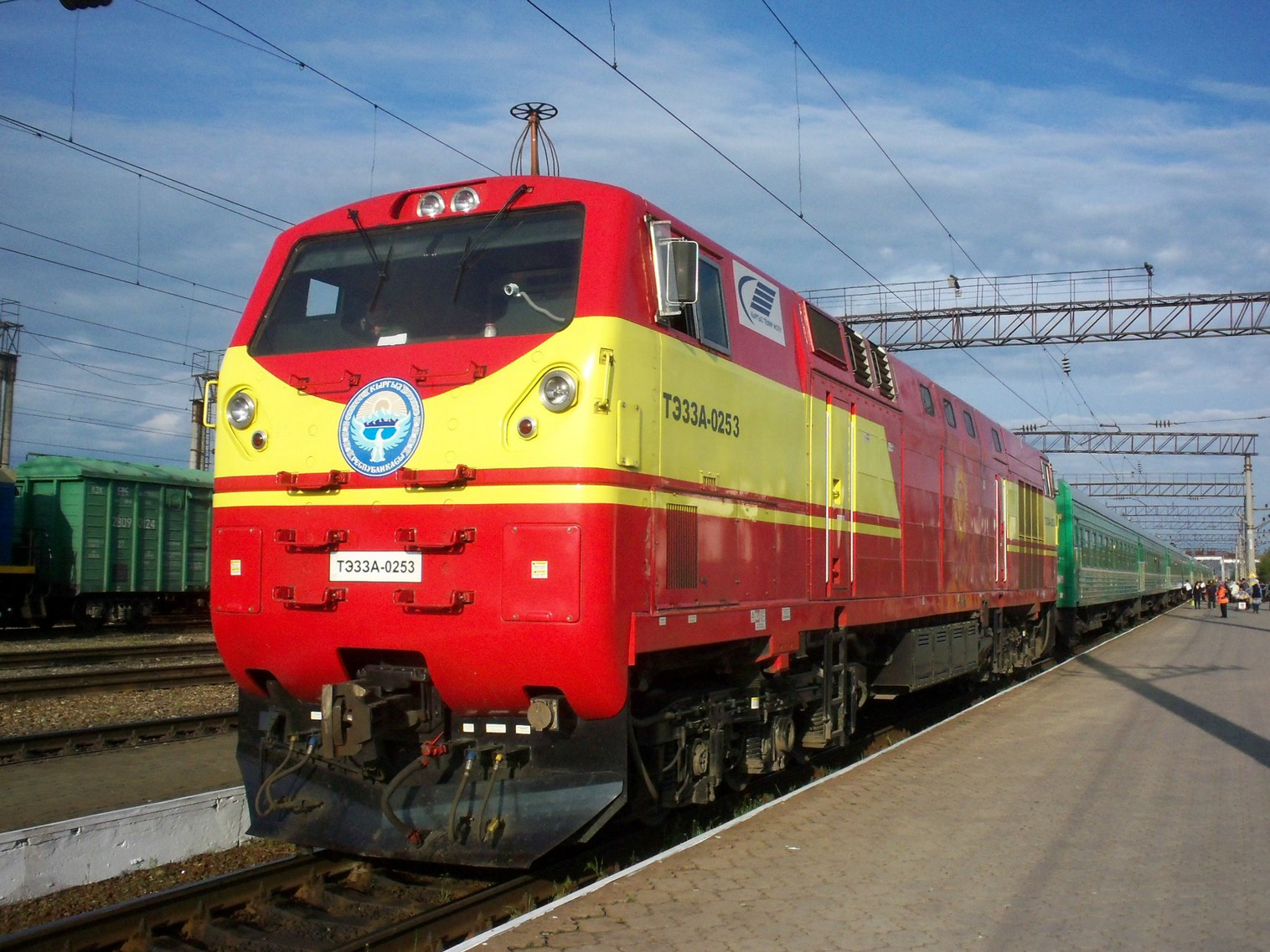
Kyrgyz Railways TE33A-0253 at an unidentified station in April 2016

On 3 July 2012 Kyrgyz Railways ordered five TE33A locomotives.

=== Moldova ===
In November 2018, Moldovan operator Calea Ferată din Moldova ordered 12 TE33A locomotives for delivery in 2020, with major components built in the United States and final assembly in Moldova.

=== Mongolia ===
In 2009, a single US-built TE33A was supplied to Mongolia Railway. As of 2013, further orders were expected.

In 2023, four TE33A units equipped with a locomotive safety system from Khazakstan were delivered to Mongolian Railways.

=== Russia ===
By 2013, discussions were held to sell TE33As to Yakutian Railway and Eurosib (the latter with up to 50 locomotives).

=== Tajikistan ===
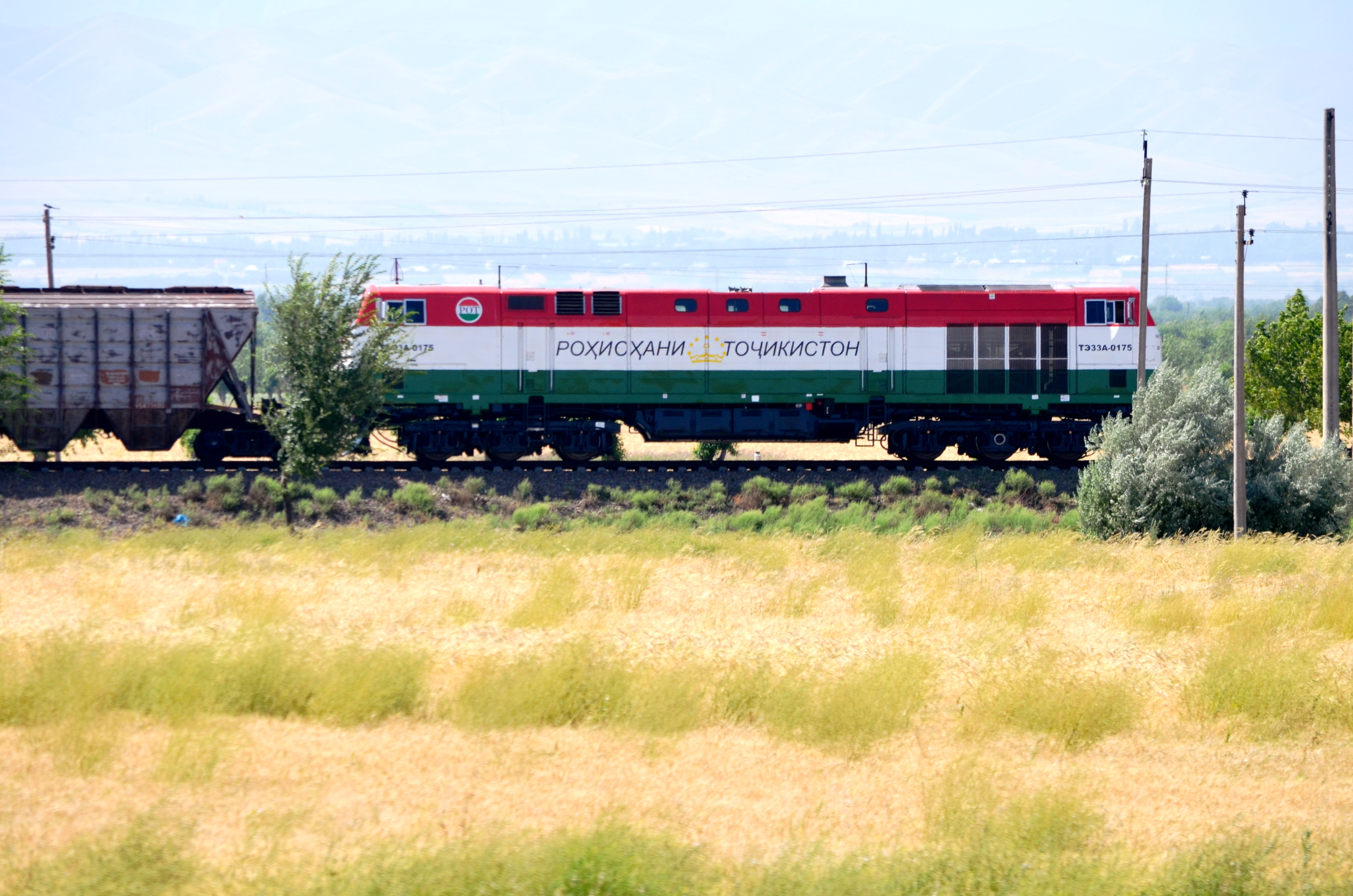
Tajik-Railway-Rohi-Ohani Tajikistan

In November 2011 Tajikistan's national railway ordered six locomotives, which were delivered in early 2012. These were the first locomotives to be exported from the Astana factory.

=== Ukraine ===
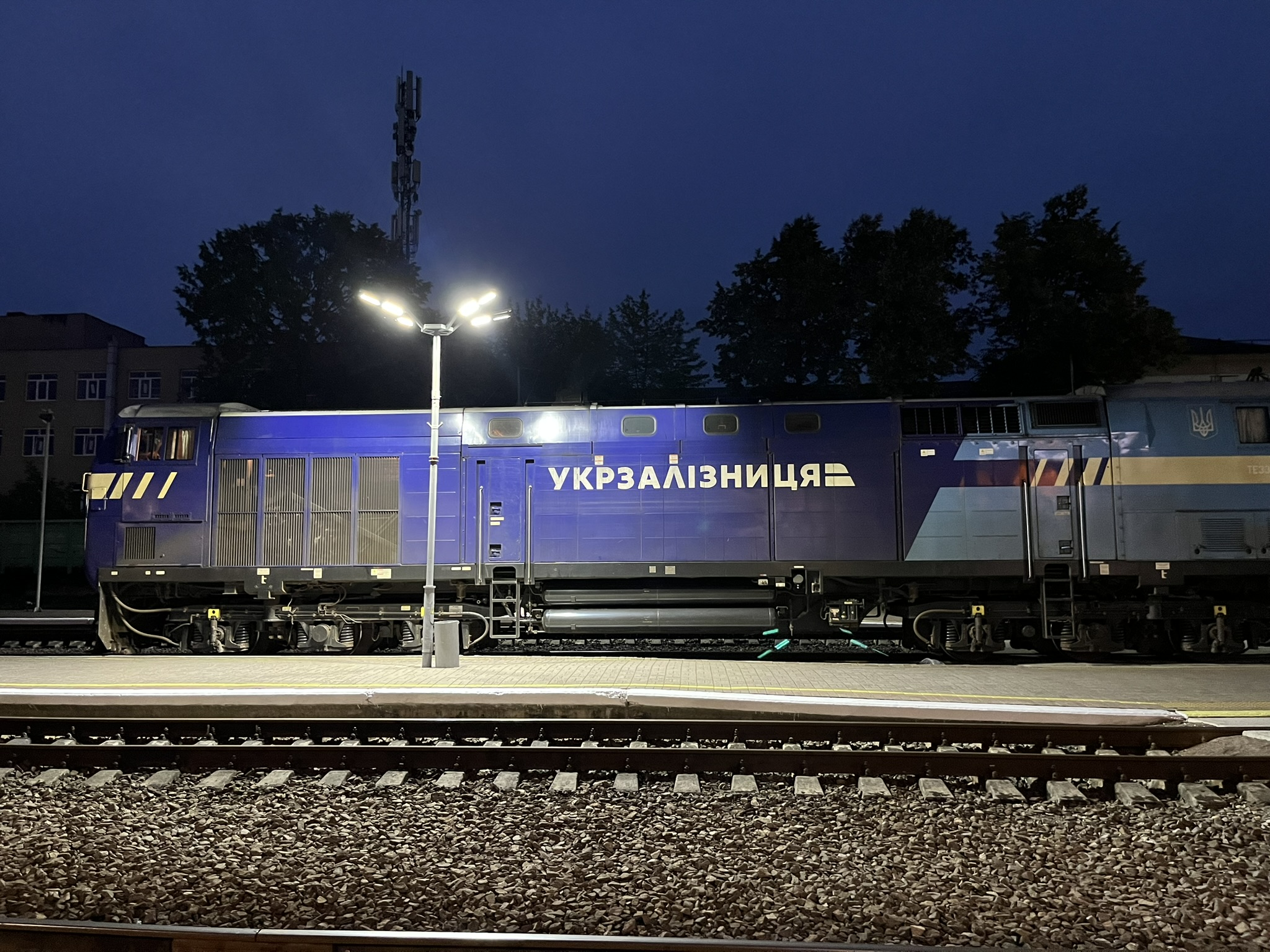
General Electric Evolution ТЕ33АС diesel locomotive at Ivano-Frankivsk railway station, August 2024

In May 2013 cement and construction materials supplier JSC Ivano-Frankivsk ordered a single TE33A locomotive. It was delivered in October 2013. In February 2018, state-owned operator Ukrainian Railways ordered 30 TE33A locomotives for delivery from the United States within two years and components to assemble up to 195 more locomotives on Ukraine during the following decade. In September 2018 (the February 2018 ordered) TE33A's started to arrive in Ukraine.

=== Turkmenistan ===
In 2014, Turkmenistan purchased one locomotive. It was used in the opening ceremony of the new railway Kazakhstan-Turkmenistan-Iran.

=== Azerbaijan ===
On 3 August 2015 Azerbaijan Railways took delivery of TE33A-0287, the first of 10 TE33A locos which are being leased from the Development Bank of Kazakhstan subsidiary DBK Leasing.

== Gallery ==
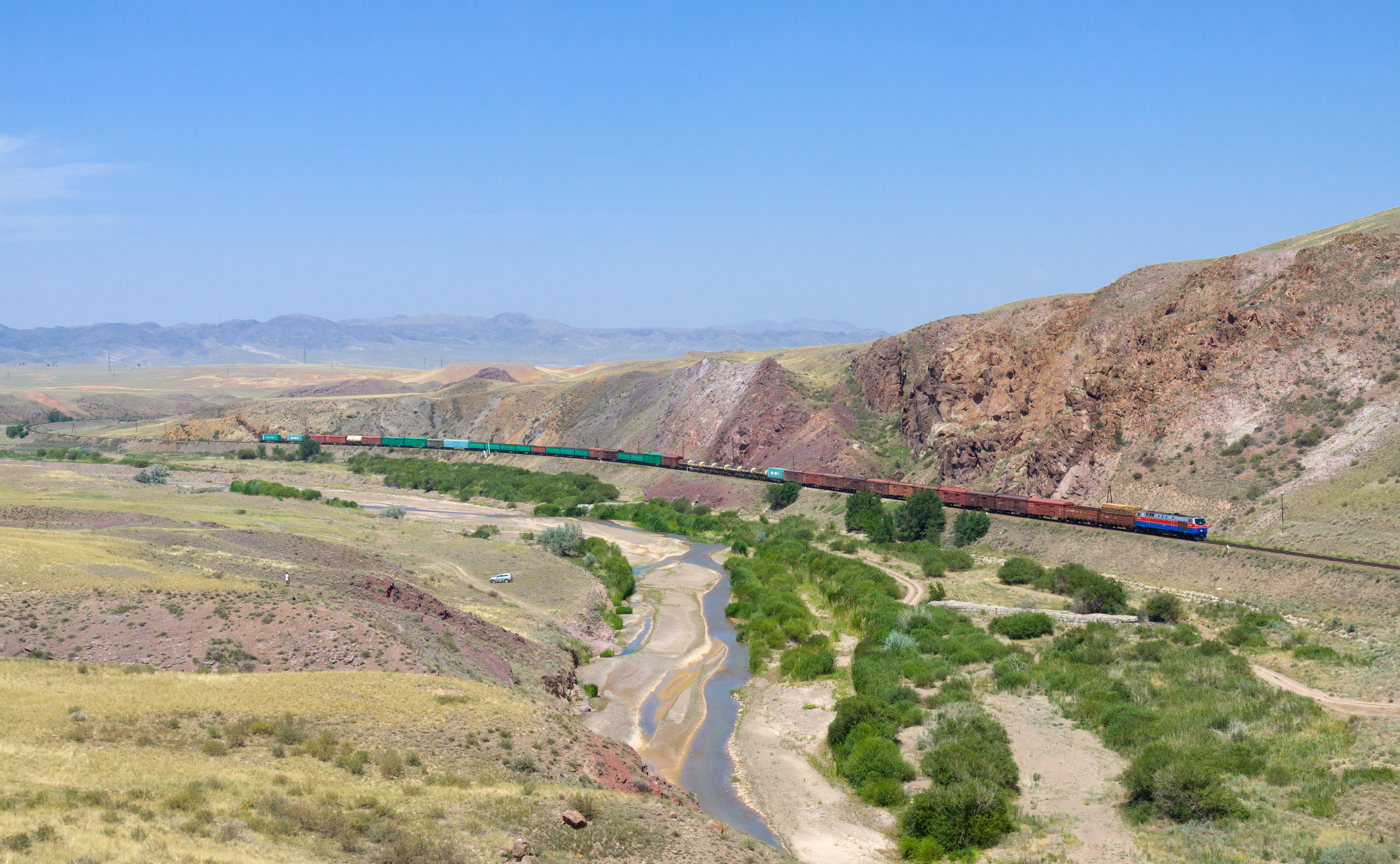

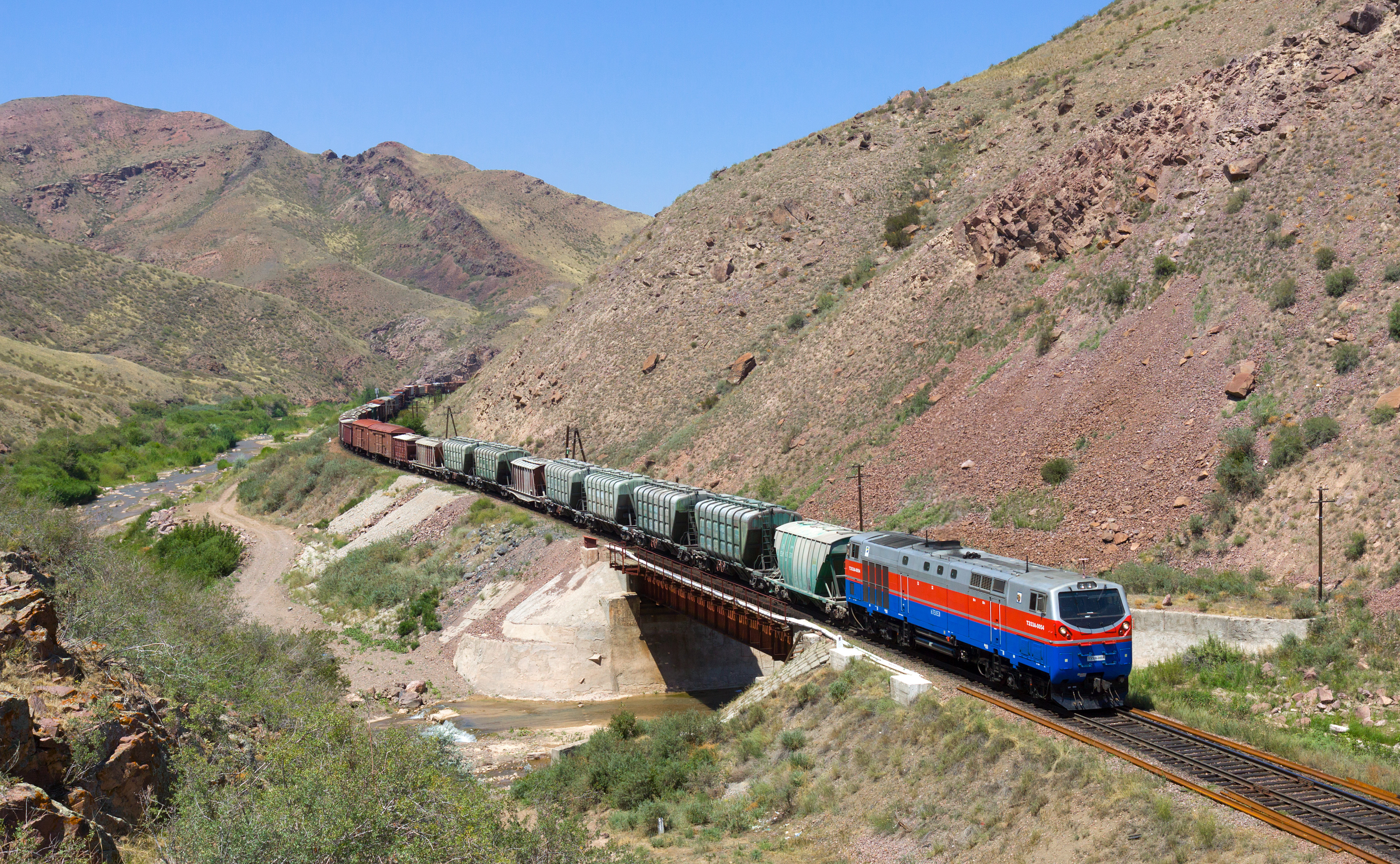

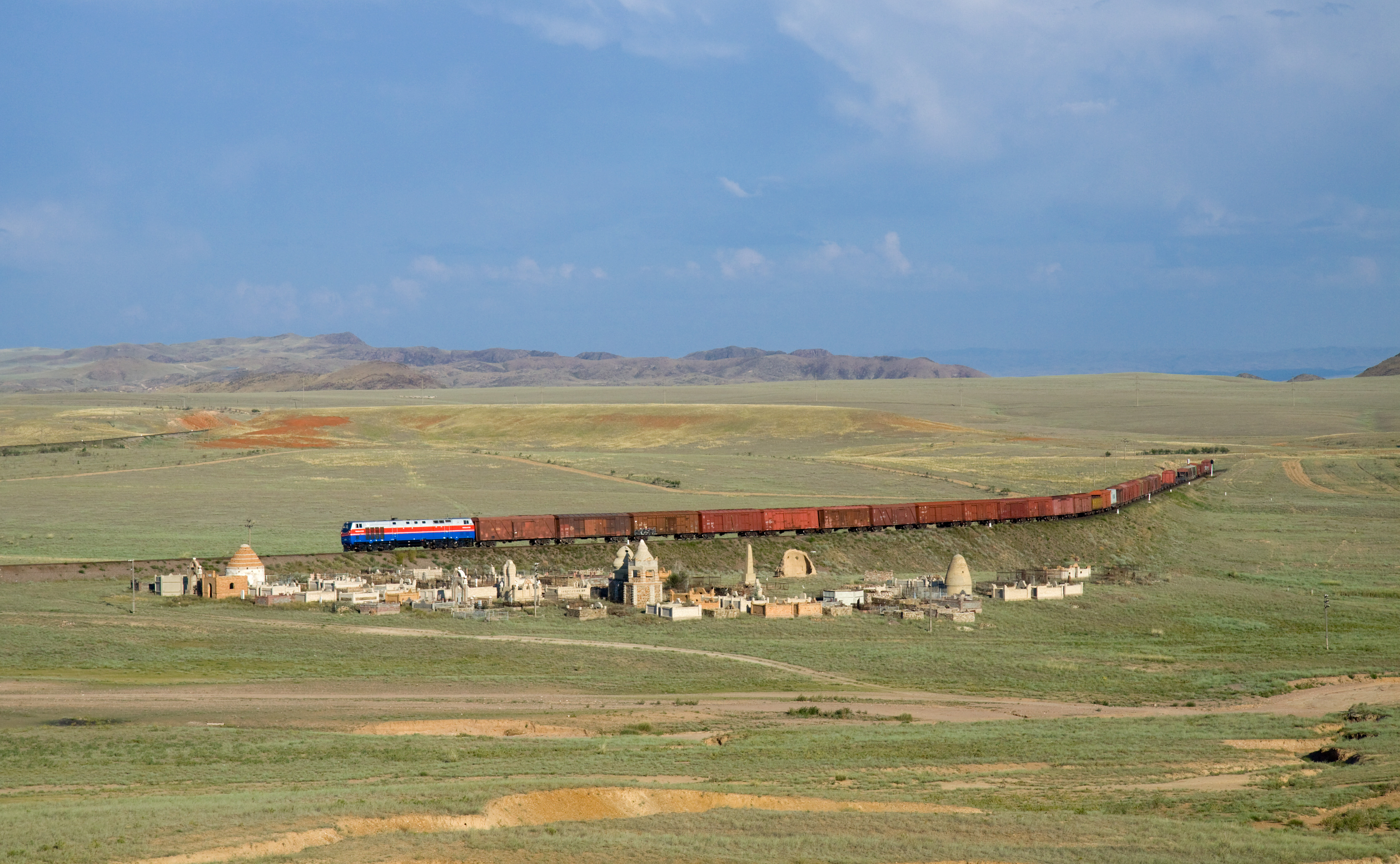

== See also ==
- Alstom KZ8A
