= Lokomotiv Kurastyru Zauyty =

JSC Lokomoti
- Type: Subsidiary
- Industry: Transportation
- Founded: 2009; 17 years ago
- Headquarters: Astana, Kazakhstan
- Products: Evolution Series Locomotive TE33A
- Owner: Wabtec
- Number of employees: 800 (2024)
- Parent: Kazakhstan Temir Zholy

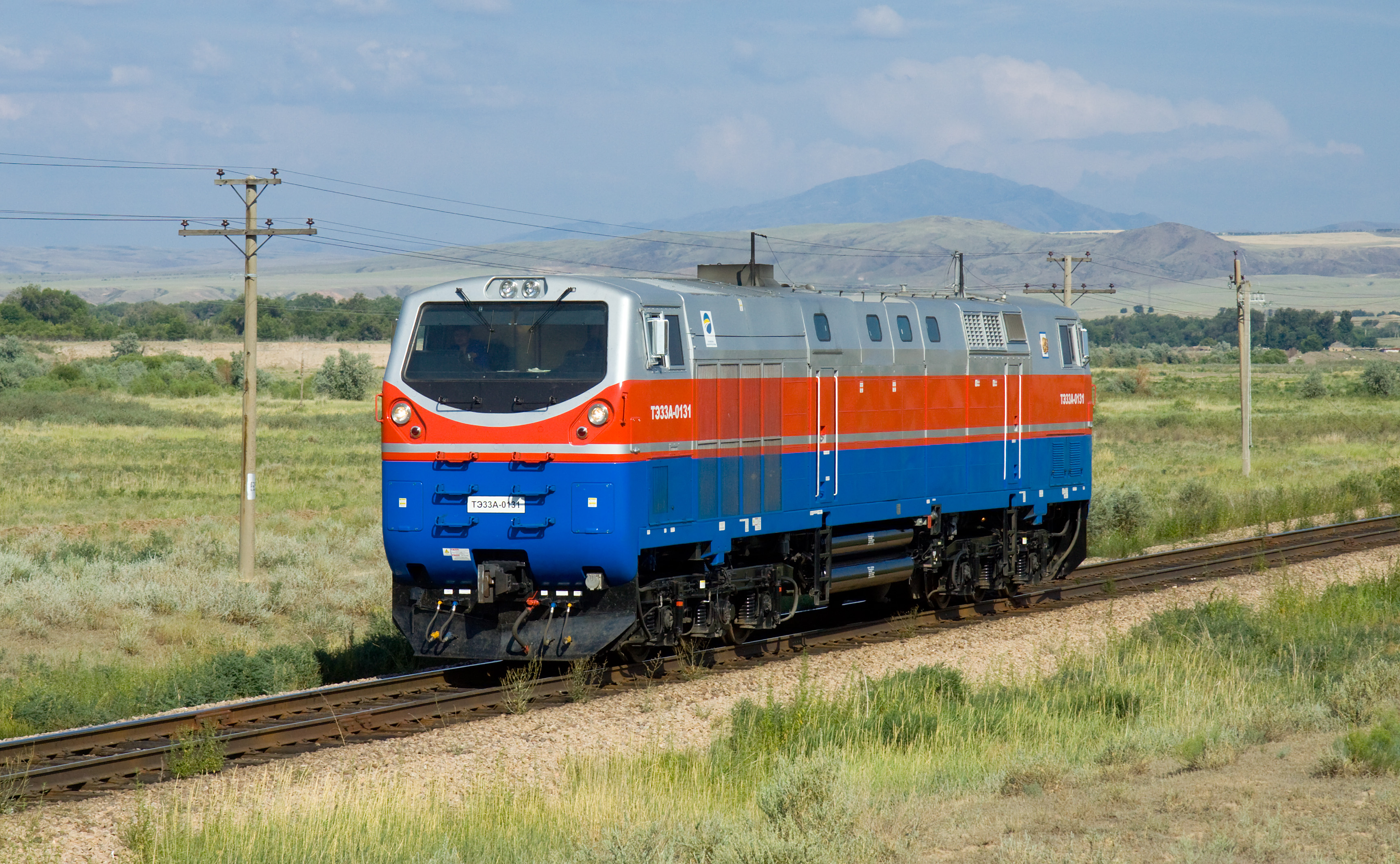

JSC Lokomotiv Kurastyru Zauyty (LKZ, "Locomotive Building Works", Kazakh: АҚ Локомотив құрастыру зауыты, AQ Lokomotıv qurastyrý zaýyty) is a Kazakh rolling stock manufacturer which builds GE Transportation TE33A locomotives at a factory in Astana which was opened by President Nursultan Nazarbayev on 3 July 2009. LKZ has been fully owned by American manufacturer Westinghouse Air Brake Technologies Corporation since 2023.

LKZ produces locomotives for freight, passenger trains, and shunting for Kazakh domestic use as well as for export across multiple countries, including Azerbaijan, Kyrgyzstan, Mongolia, Tajikistan, and Turkmenistan.

== History and ownership ==
Following the dissolution of the Soviet Union, newly-independent Kazakhstan needed to modernise its rolling stock. The Kazakh government's Kazakhstan State Priority Industrial-Innovative Development Programme chose to adopt a domestic-production strategy. In September 2006, KTZ placed a US$10 million order with American-based GE Transportation for 310 GE Evolution-series locomotives. 300 of these locomotives were contracted to be assembled in Kazakhstan, for which a locomotive assembly plant, at the time called TOO Lokomotiv Leasing (Locomotive Leasing LLC) began construction in 2007.

LKZ was founded in 2009 as a 50/50 joint venture between Kazkahstan's national railway company, Kazakhstan Temir Zholy (KTZ), and the Russian Transmashholding rolling stock manufacturer. Its factory in Astana (then known as Nur-Sultan) was opened by President Nursultan Nazarbayev on 3 July 2009, with capacity to produce up to 100 units per year. LKZ signed a US$500 million 15-year contract with GE Transportation to service and overhaul 404 2TE10 locomotives for KTZ. The first TE33A units constructed in Kazakhstan were presented on 7 December 2009, and LKZ had reached its full production capacity of 8 units per month by May 2012.

In 2017, GE Transportation purchased KTZ's shares in LKZ. GE Transportation was subsequently spun off and acquired by Westinghouse Air Brake Technologies Corporation (Wabtec) in 2018; thus, Wabtec and Transmashholding each held a 50% stake in LKZ by the end of that year.

In 2023, Wabtec fully acquired the remaining stake in LKZ for US$91 million, thus becoming the sole owner of the company.

== Products ==
- TE33A — diesel locomotive
- TEM11A — four-axle shunting diesel locomotive

== Orders and exports ==
Between 2009 and 2016, LKZ had built 288 TE33As for Kazkahstan, as well as 24 more locomotives for various operators, including:

- 4 for Tajik Railway
- 1 for Ivano-Frankivsktsement of Ukraine
- 6 for Kyrgyzstan
- 1 for Turkmenistan
- 10 for Azerbaijan
