= D1 multiple unit =

Class of Soviet 4-car diesel multiple units

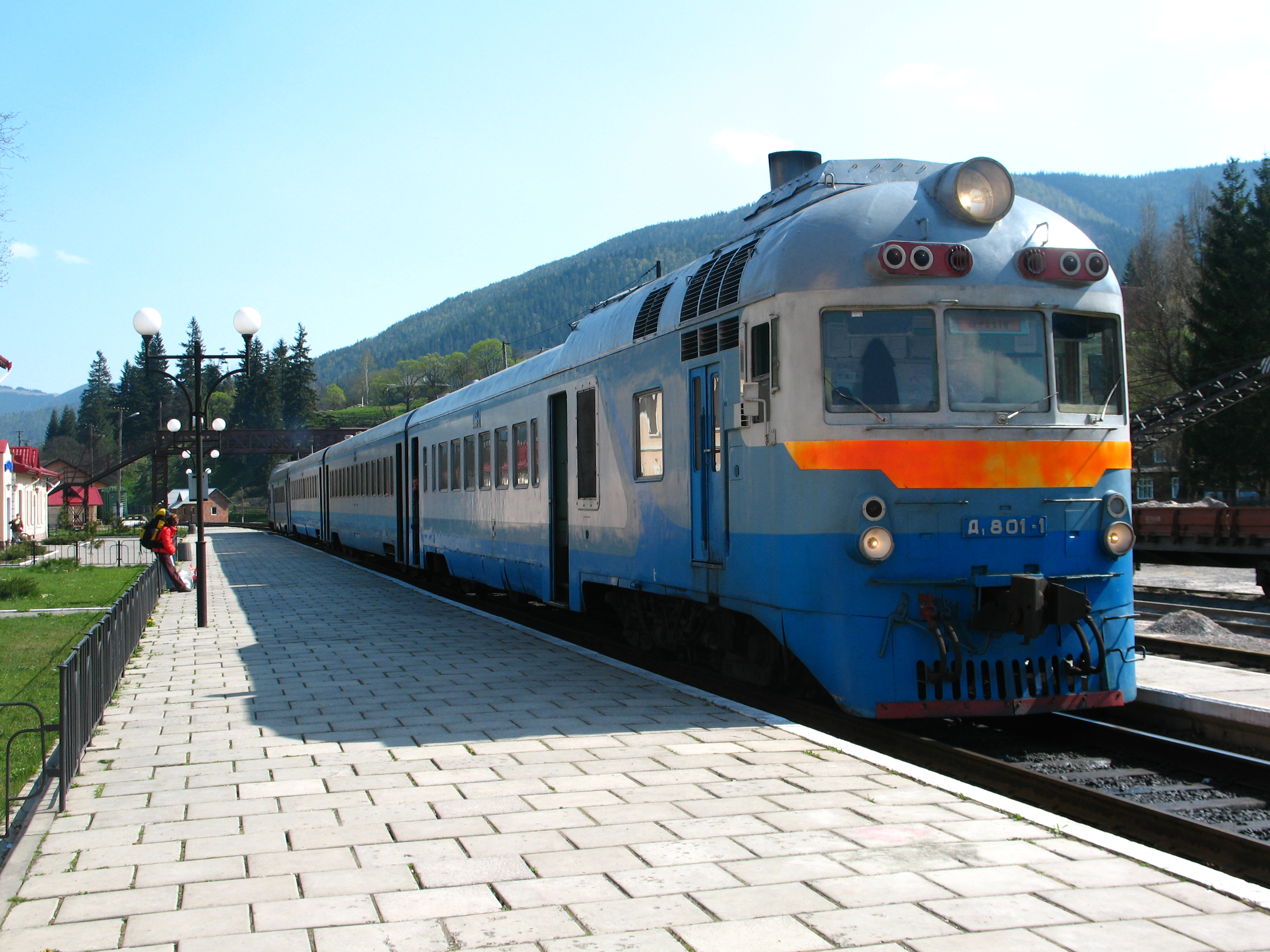
- One of the newest D1s at Vorokhta station, Ukrainian Railways.
- Manufacturer: Ganz-MAVAG
- Constructed: 1960s-1980s

Specifications
- Prime mover: Ganz MAVAG 12V FE 17/24, Volvo Penta I6 TAD1662VE 14.4/16.5 (after rebuilt)
- Coupling system: SA3
- Track gauge: 1,520 mm (4 ft 11 27/32 in) Russian gauge

D1 (Д_{1}) is a 4-car diesel multiple unit train built in 1960s-1980s by Hungarian producer Ganz-MAVAG for Soviet railways.

== D1M ==
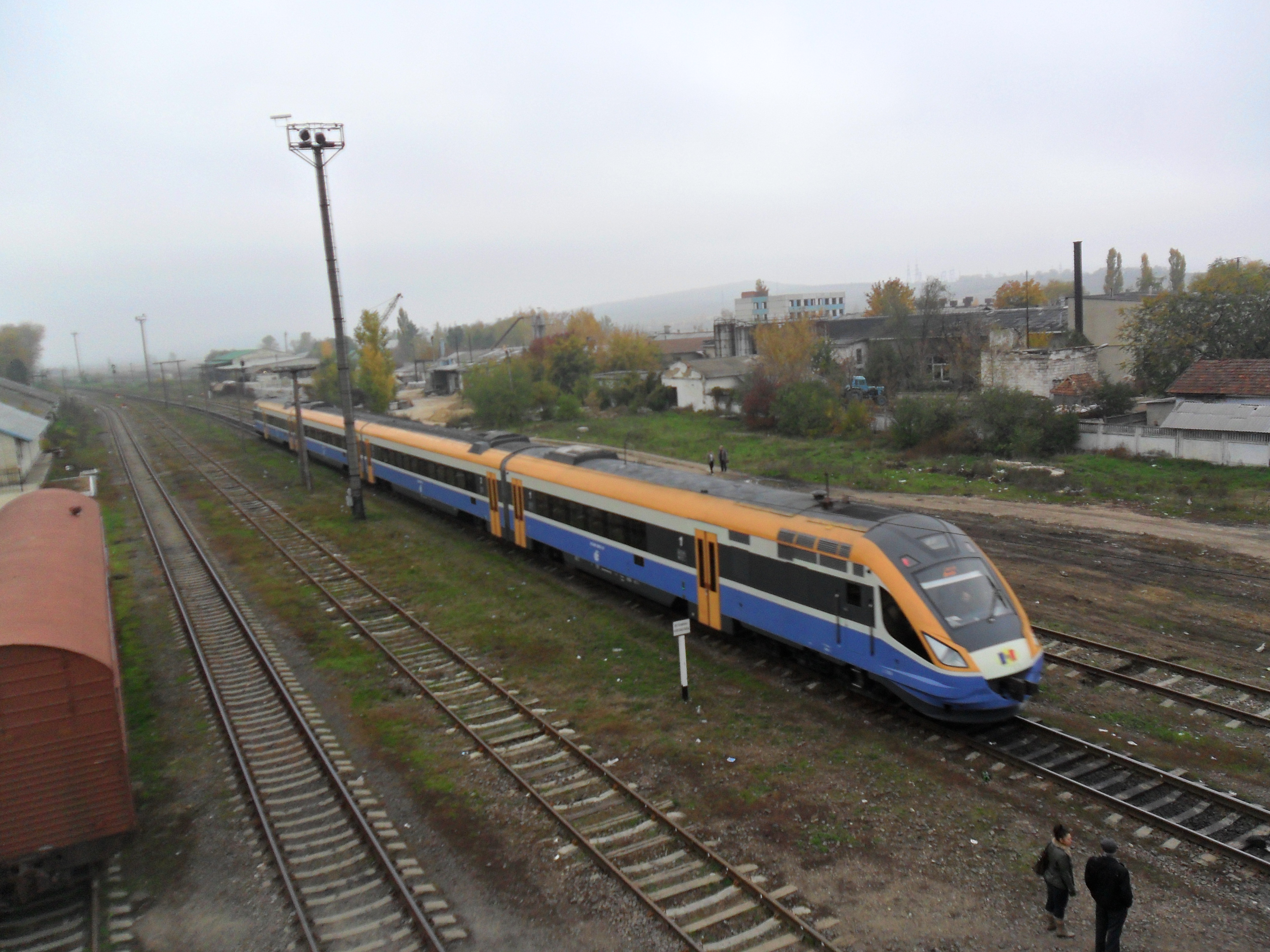
One of the rebuilt D1M DMU at Strășeni train station, Moldova

In 2012, Moldovan Railway and Electroputere VFU company in Romania started a complete modernization program for D1 units (as D1M), with most of the parts changed, including installation of a new engine by Volvo Penta. In addition, the refurbished units were equipped with air conditioning system, wireless internet access points, and disability access ramps.

== Gallery ==
=== Exterior ===
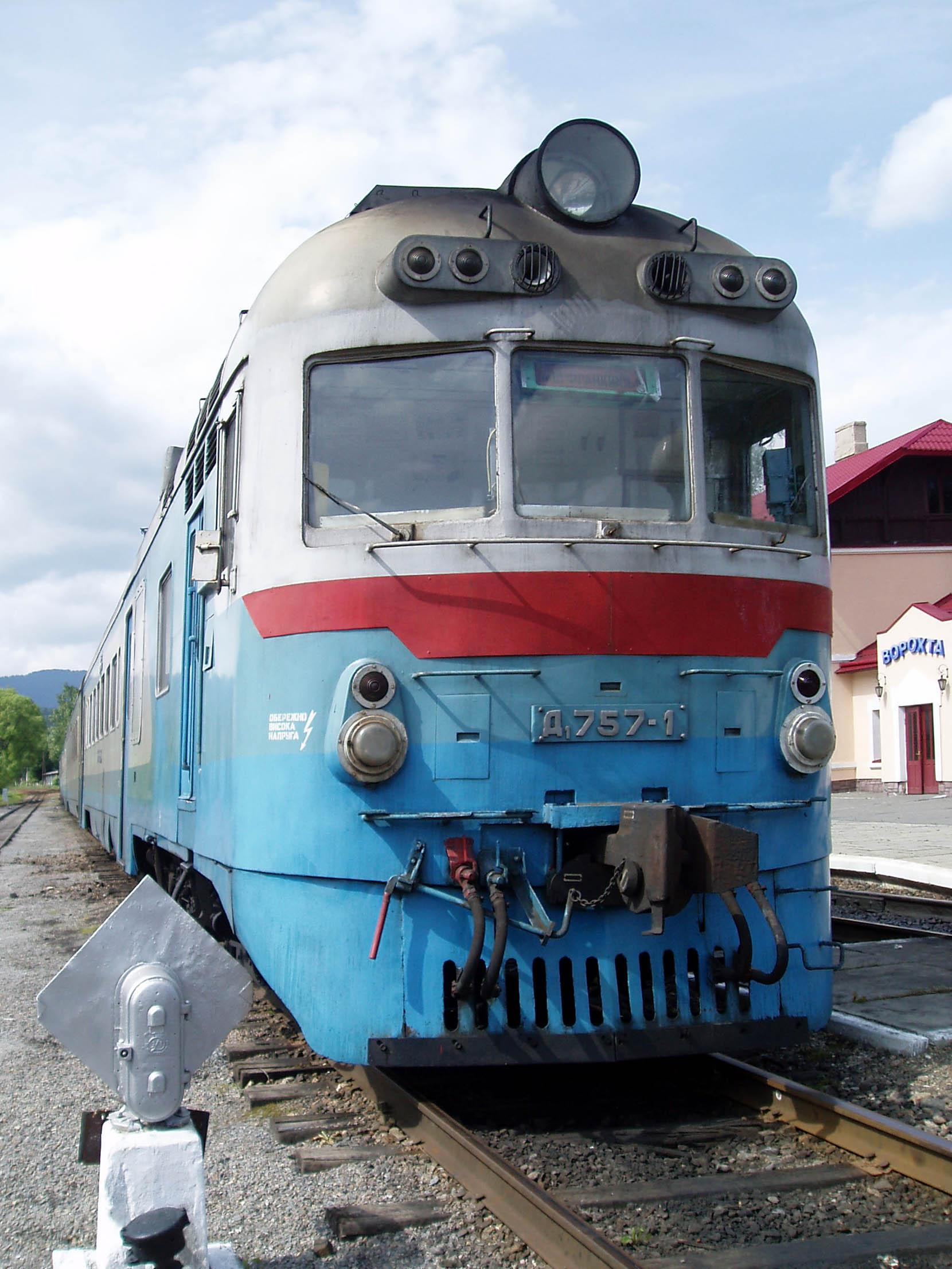
Front of a control car

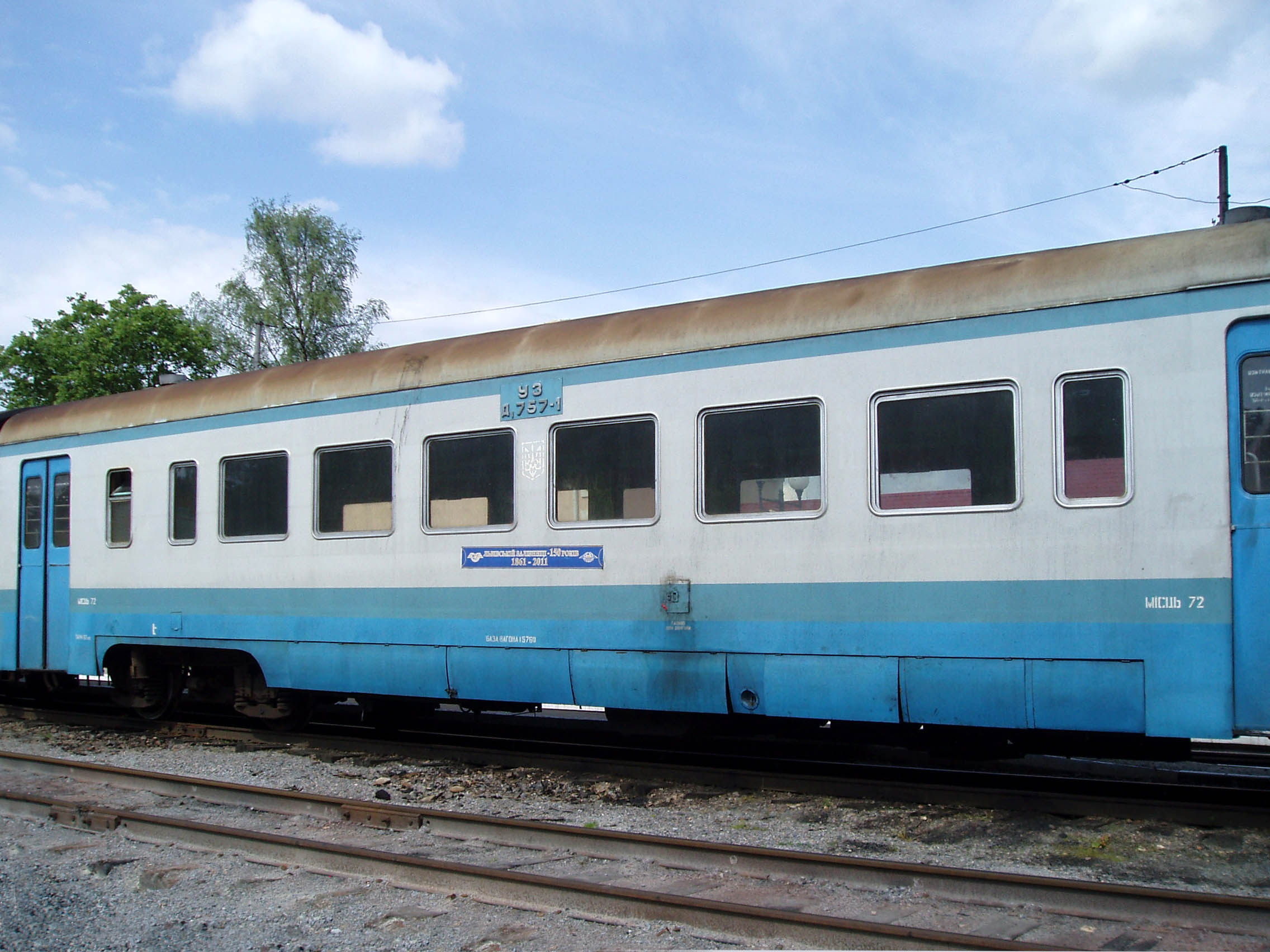
Side of a control car

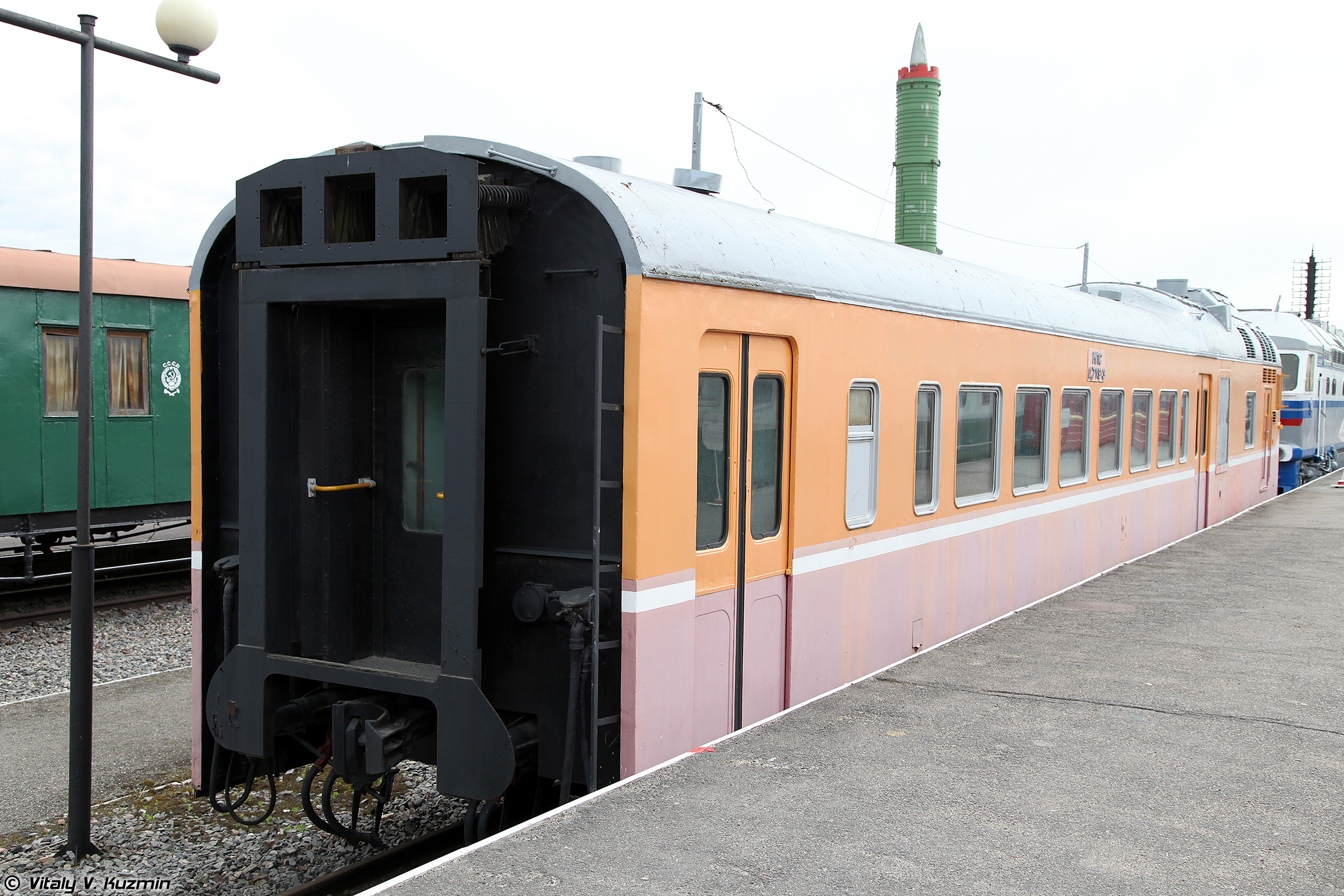
Back of a control car

=== Interior ===
==== Passenger's interior ====
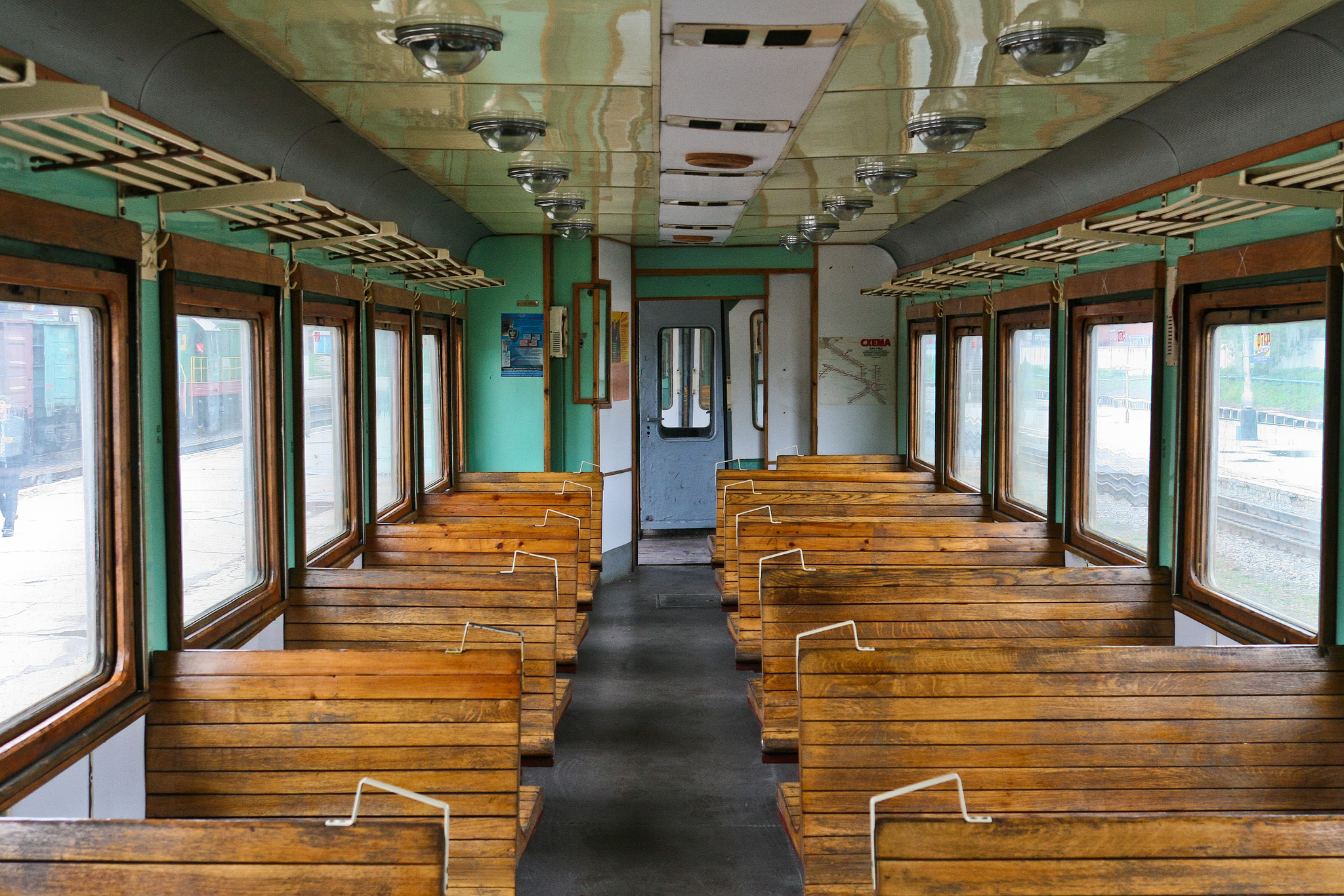
Interior of a control car with wooden seats

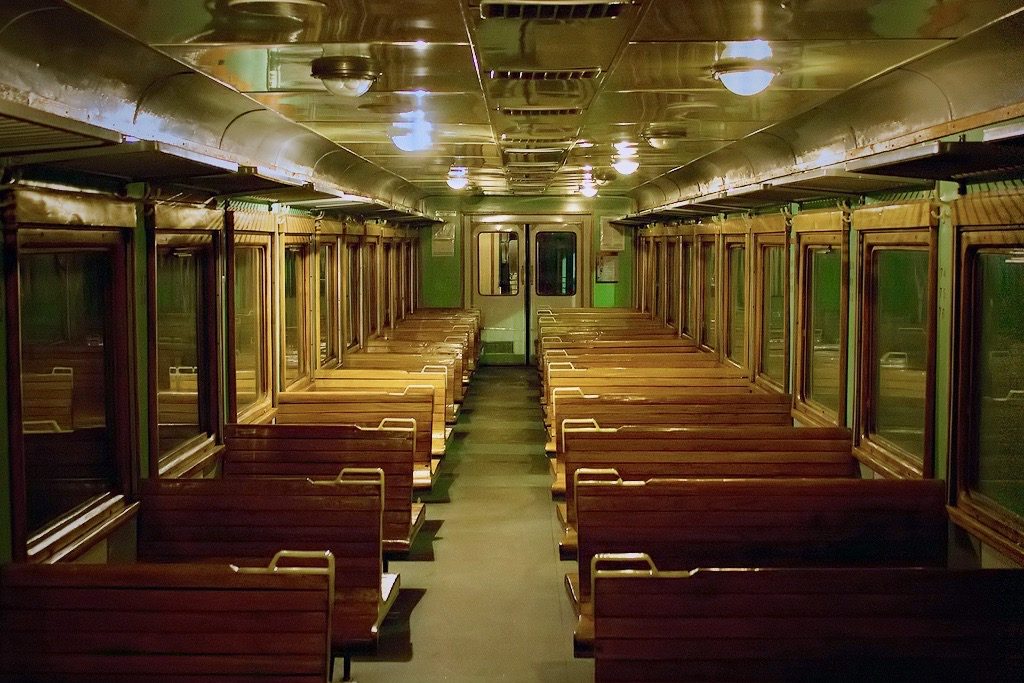
Interior of an intermediate car with wooden seats

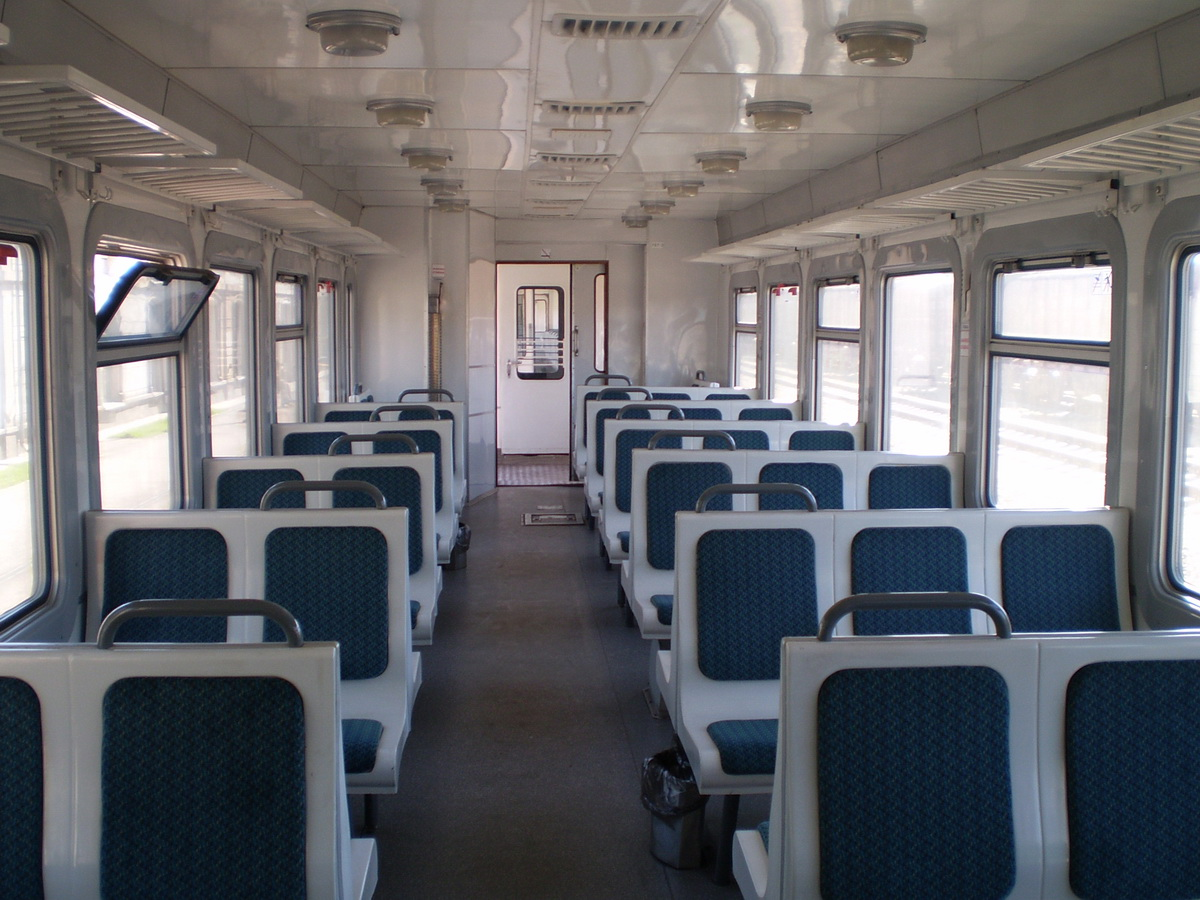
Interior of a control car with plastic seats

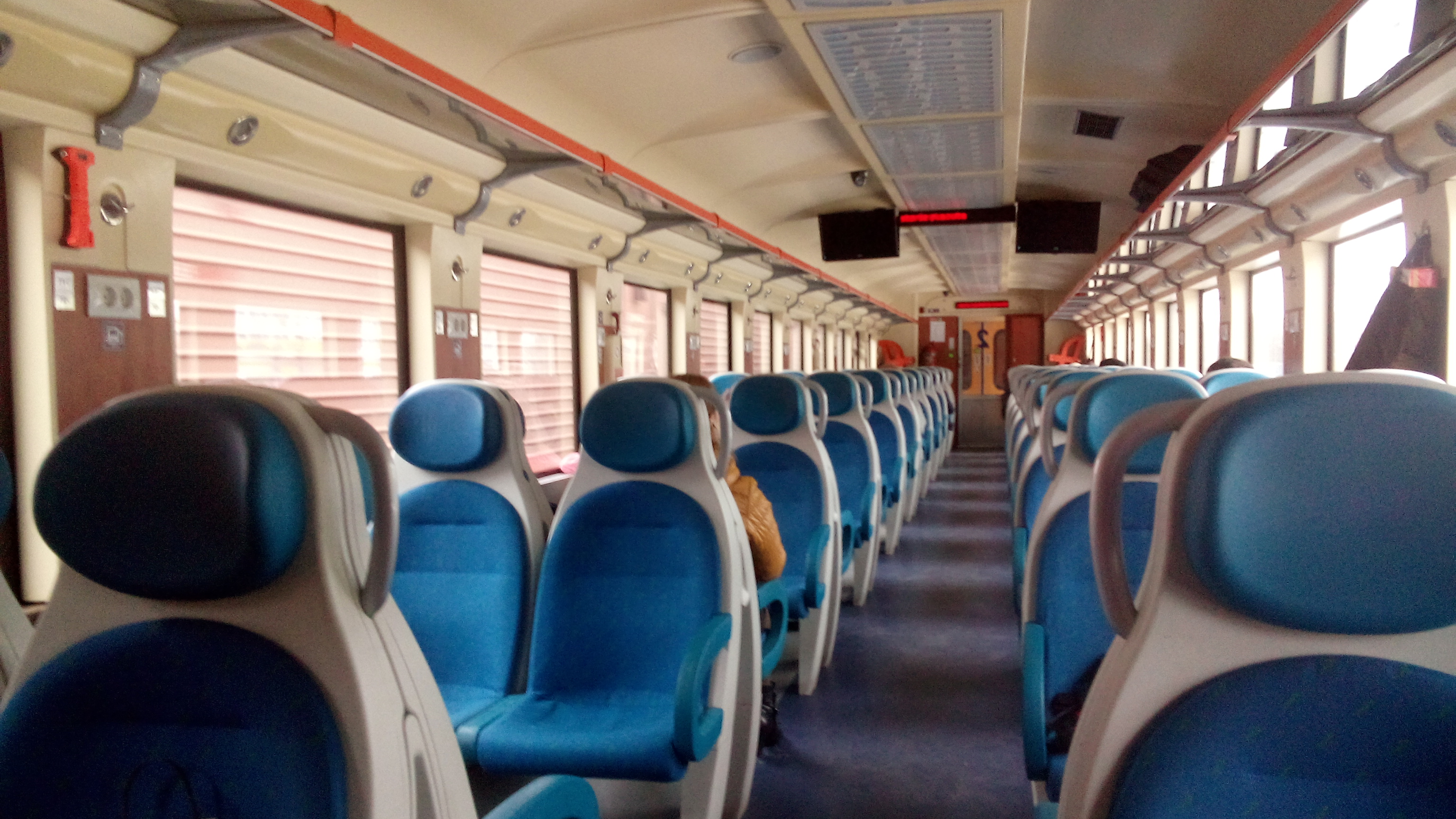
Interior of an intermediate car inside a D1M train

==== Driver's cabin ====
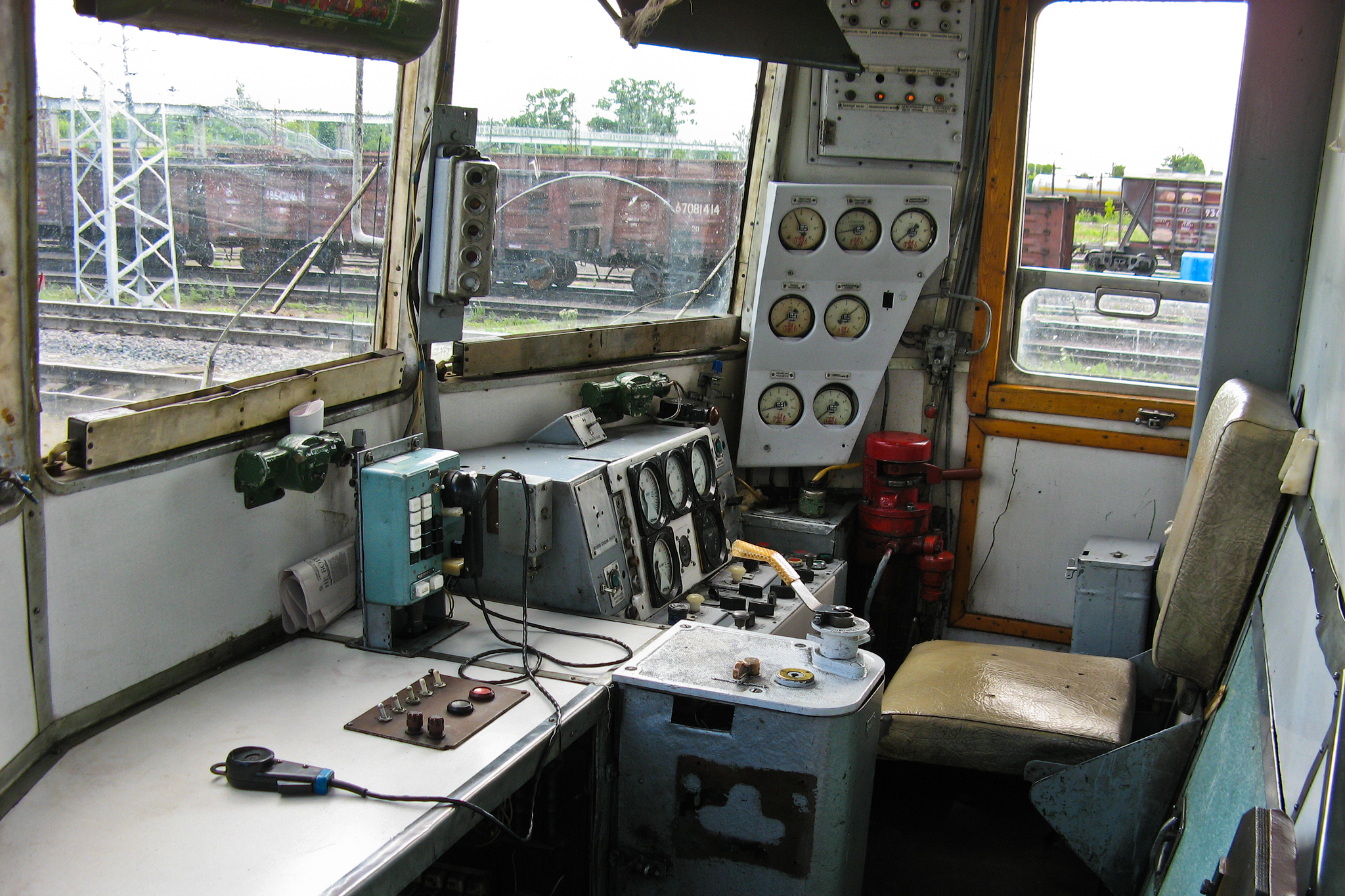
Common view of a driver's cabin

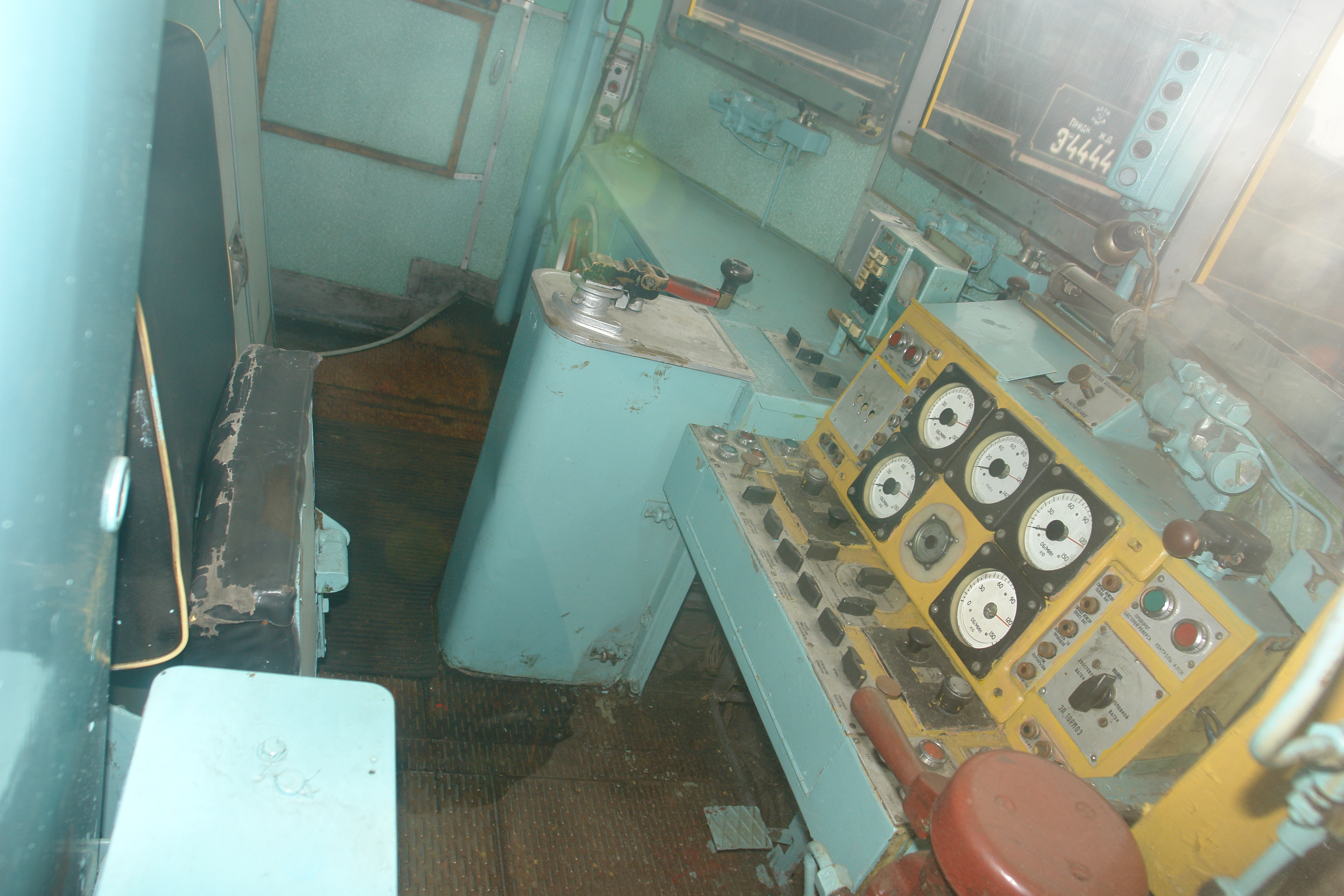
Control panel inside driver's cabin

== See also ==
- History of rail transport in Russia
