= Calea Ferată din Moldova =

Railway company in the Republic of Moldova

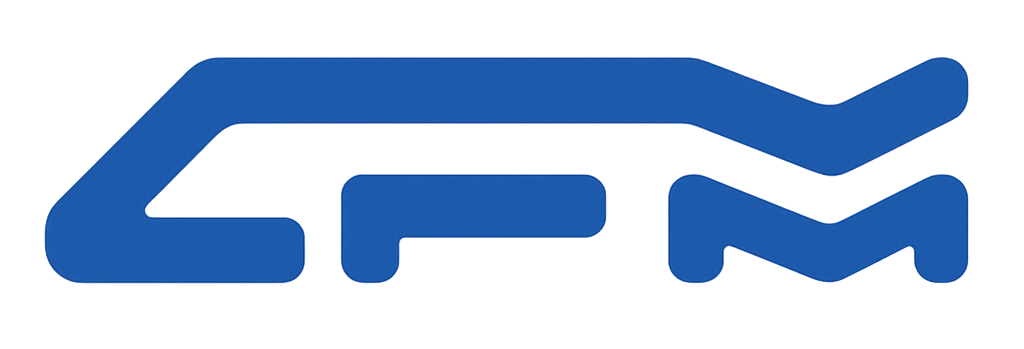

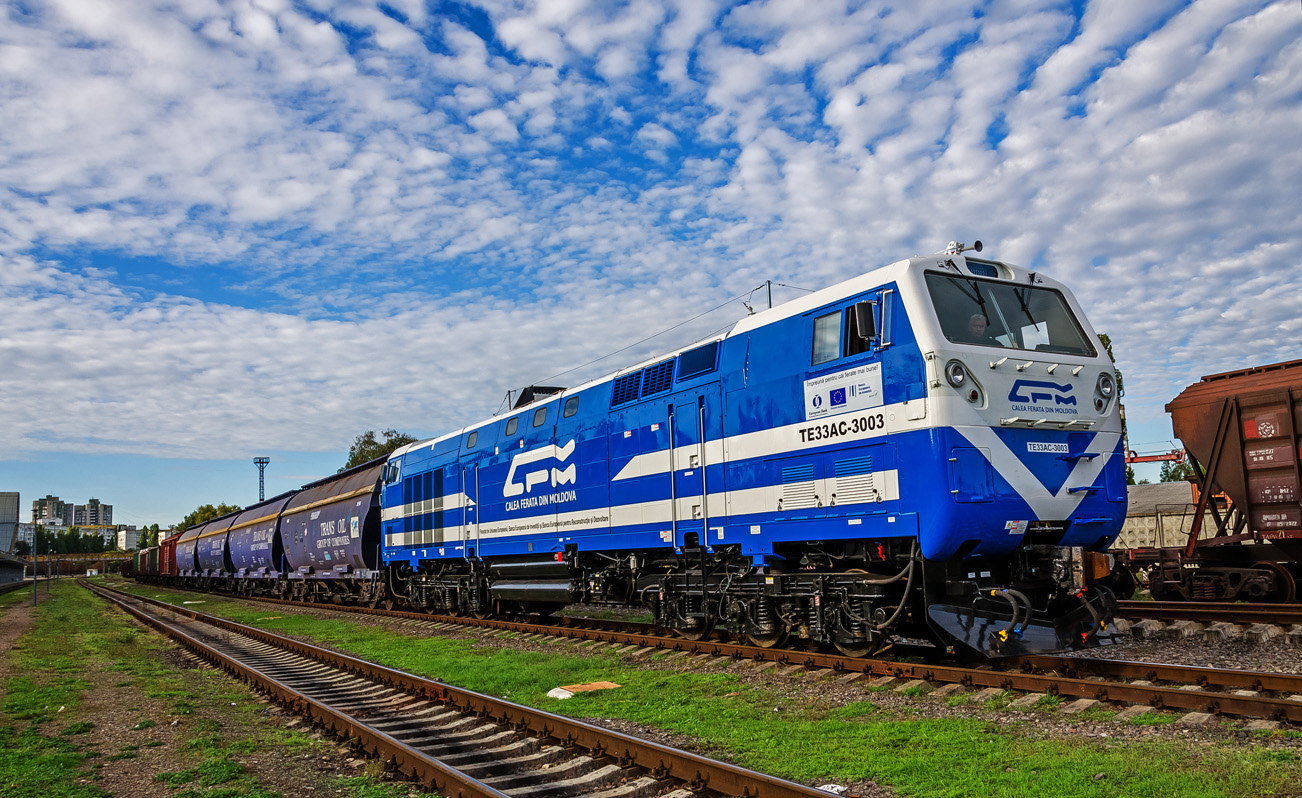
- TE33A diesel locomotive hauling wagons
- Type: State enterprise
- Industry: Rail transport
- Founded: 30 March 1992; 34 years ago
- Headquarters: Chișinău, Moldova
- Key people: Serghei Cotelinic, CEO
- Products: Rail transport, cargo transport, services
- Owner: Moldova (state-owned)
- Website: www.railway.md/ Timetable (in Romanian)

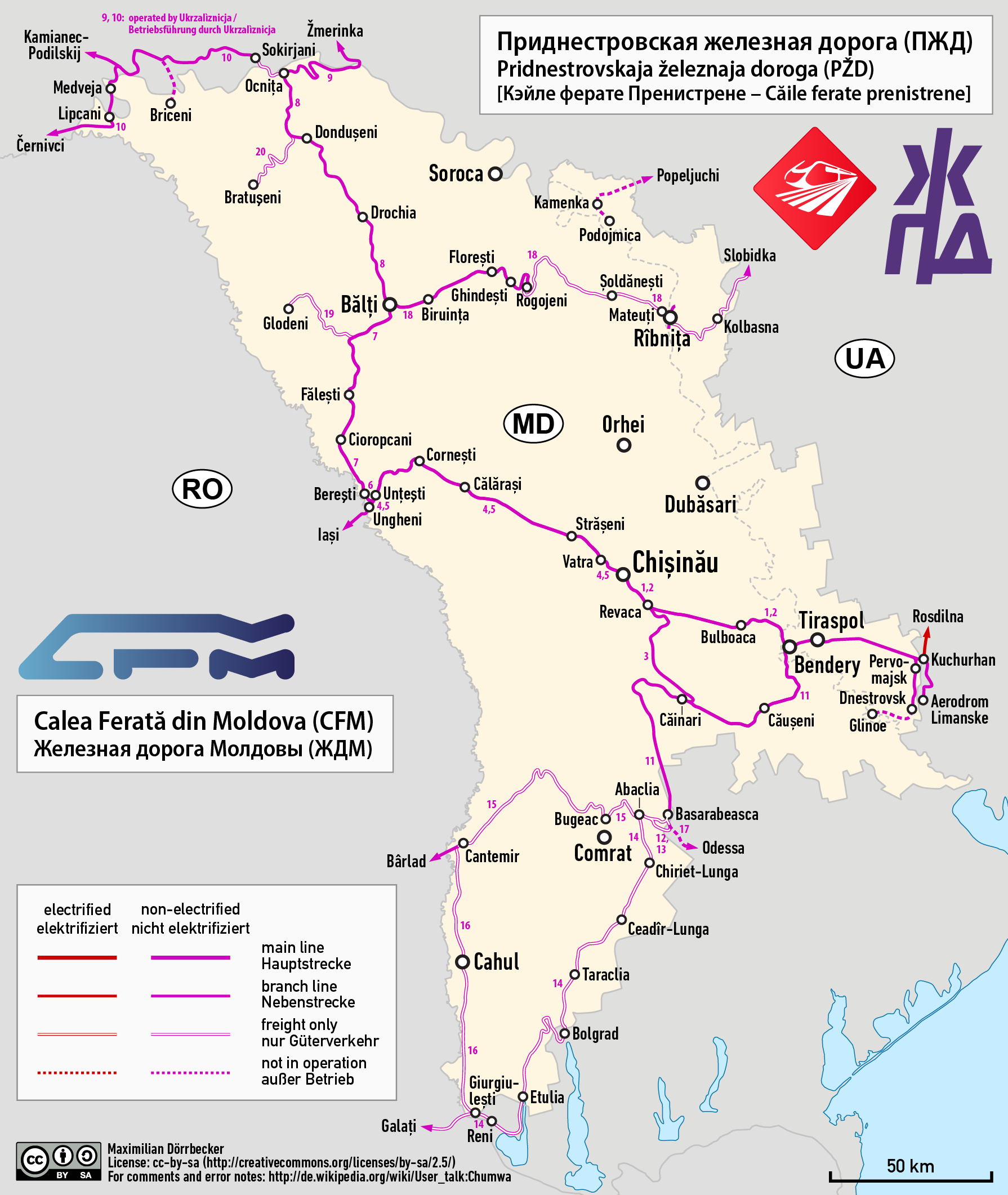
Railway map of Moldova

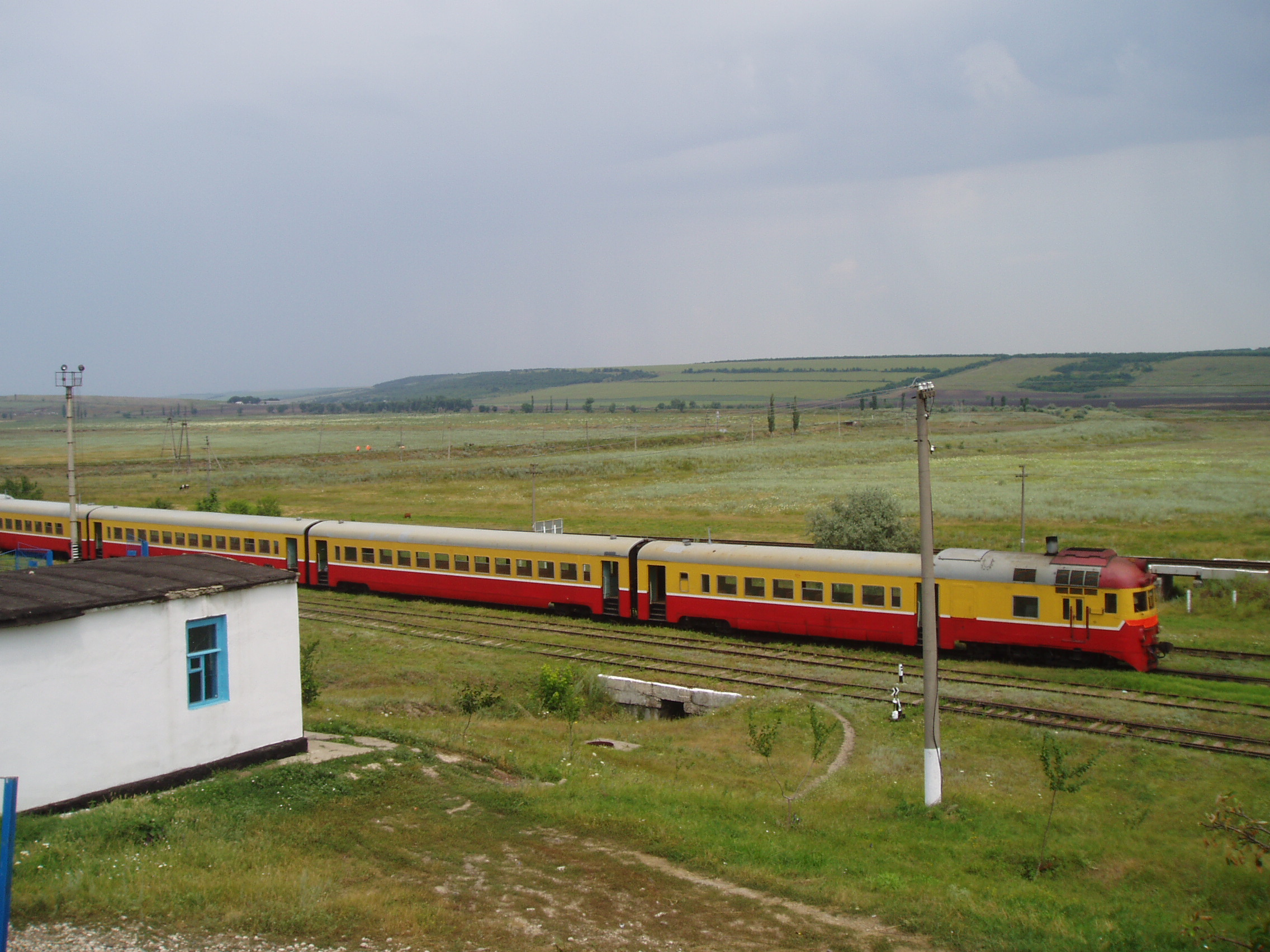
One of the old D1 DMUs on the Chișinău-Comrat line.

Calea Ferată din Moldova (abbreviated as CFM) is the sole railway operator in the Republic of Moldova, responsible for passenger and cargo transportation, as well as railway infrastructure maintenance within the country. The total length of the network managed by CFM (as of 2009) is 1,232 kilometres (766 mi), of which 1,218 kilometres (757 mi) are 1,520 mm (4 ft 11 27/32 in) (broad gauge), and 14 kilometres (8.7 mi) are 1,435 mm (4 ft 8 1/2 in) (standard gauge). The entire network is single track and is not electrified. It borders the Romanian railway network, with a 1,520 mm (4 ft 11 27/32 in)/1,435 mm (4 ft 8 1/2 in) break-of-gauge in the west, and the Ukrainian railway network in the east.

Calea Ferată din Moldova (literally "Railway of Moldova" in Romanian) came into existence in 1991 as the successor to the former MŽD, a subdivision of SŽD, the Railway system of the Soviet Union.

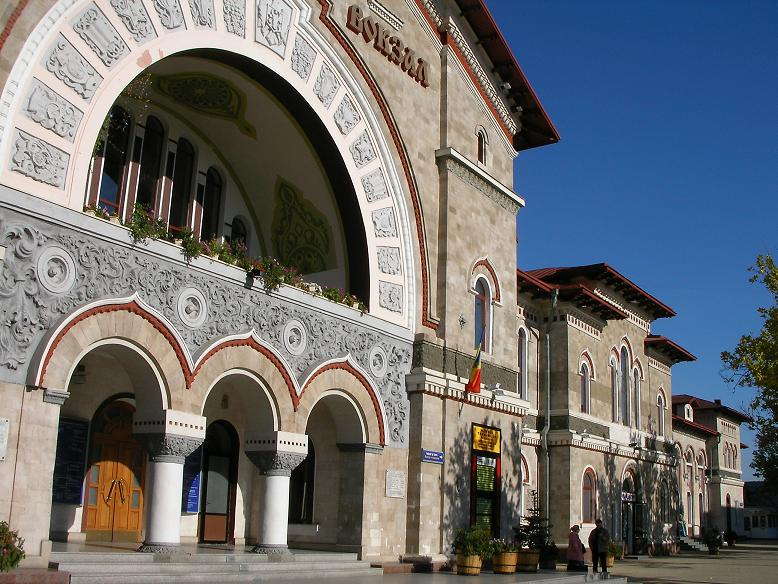
Chișinău Railway Station.

== History ==
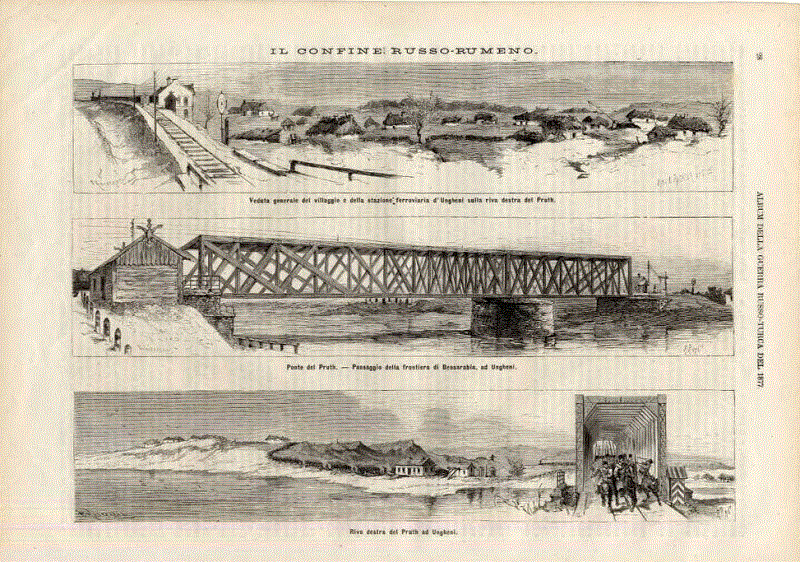
The project of the Eiffel Bridge across the Prut river, built in 1877 to connect the railways of the Russian Empire and Romania.

In 1844, Governor-General of Novorossiya and Bessarabia Count Mikhail Vorontsov has developed a project of a railway, connecting Odesa and Parcani village by the Dniester. Odesa-Kyiv railway company proposed to connect Odesa and Kyiv with a branch to Parcani via Tiraspol. According to the decree of Nikolay I, the construction was sponsored by government funds.

In 1871 a bridge over the Dniester was constructed. On 28 August 1871, the railway linking Tiraspol with Chișinău was officially opened. This date is recognized as the date of establishment of Moldovan Railways. The line, connecting Bessarabia to the Black Sea and the railway network of Ukraine and Russia became the basis for future development.

On 18 May [O.S. 6 May] 1872 a Russian diplomat agent, Ivan Alekseevich Zinov'ev and the Romanian Minister of Foreign Affairs Gheorghe Costaforu signed a rail junction convention, which was ratified on 21 January [O.S. 9 January] 1873. On 1 June 1875, the line Chișinău-Cornești-Ungheni was opened (the Chișinău-Cornești railway was built between 1871 and 1873) and connection to Romania was established. The Eiffel Bridge was opened on 21 April [O.S. 9 April] 1877, just three days before the outbreak of the Russo-Turkish War (1877–1878).

In the first months of the war the Tighina-Basarabeasca-Reni-Giurgiulești line was hastily built; it opened in November 1877. In 1893-1894 the Lipcani-Ocnița-Otaci, Ocnița-Bălți and Bălți-Florești-Rîbnița-Cobasna lines started operation. During World War I, in 1917, the Bălți-Ungheni section was built, which finally connected the Northern and the Southern lines.

In the early 1920s, as Moldova had united with Romania, the tracks were converted to standard gauge. In the interwar years the Basarabeasca-Cantemir and Revaca-Căinari lines appeared.

After World War II Moldova became part of the Soviet Union and the rail network reverted to broad gauge. During the Soviet era the Cantemir-Cahul line was built (1971).

In 2004, all property in Transnistria was taken over by the newly formed Transnistrian Railway (PŽD, Pridnyestrovskaja železnaja doroga).

In 2005, the Revaca-Căinari railway was reconstructed (it was destroyed in 1944) to bypass Transnistrian controlled Bender and reconnect the southern lines with the main network. In 2007-2008 the Cahul-Giurgiulești line was constructed.

== Modernisation of lines ==
On 6 November 2022, a direct passenger rail service between Kyiv and Chișinău was re-established after 20 years of having no immediate train route between the capitals of Ukraine and Moldova.

The first freight train in 25 years travelled on the Basarabeasca-Berezino line from Ukraine in April 2023, the line having been recently renovated by a joint Moldova/Ukrainian team in just over a month. This line reopens a historic connection between Ukraine and Romania and bypasses Transnistria.

An investment of EUR 71 million was agreed in 2023 for the reconstruction of the Balti-Valcinet-Ungheni and Chisinau-Cainari railway sections, part of the funding coming from the European Bank for Reconstruction and Development (EBRD) and the EU, with Moldovan railways putting in EUR 28 million, the aim being to facilitate grain traffic heading to the port of Constanta from Ukraine.

The EU proposed in 2023 that their Trans-European Transport Network (TEN-T) be extended to Moldova and onwards to Ukraine with a standard gauge (1435mm) rail line, to assist in the integration of Moldova with EU rail networks. Starting with the Ungheni, on the border with Romania, to Chisinau, by laying a new line alongside the existing 1520mm track, to avoid disruption to existing traffic.

On 10 October 2025, the foreign ministers of the Odesa Triangle officially opened a new direct railway connection, dubbed the "friendship train" (Prietenia), from Kyiv via Chișinău to Bucharest (with the bogie exchange taking place at the break of gauge at Ungheni). A previous railway between Kyiv and Bucharest via the Vicșani–Vadu Siret route, bypassing Moldova, had been closed for 5 years. But after successful trilateral negotiations for resumption in Darabani in August 2025, and a test run finding no technical problems, train passenger services via the new route through Ungheni and Chișinău began in September 2025.

== Rolling stock ==
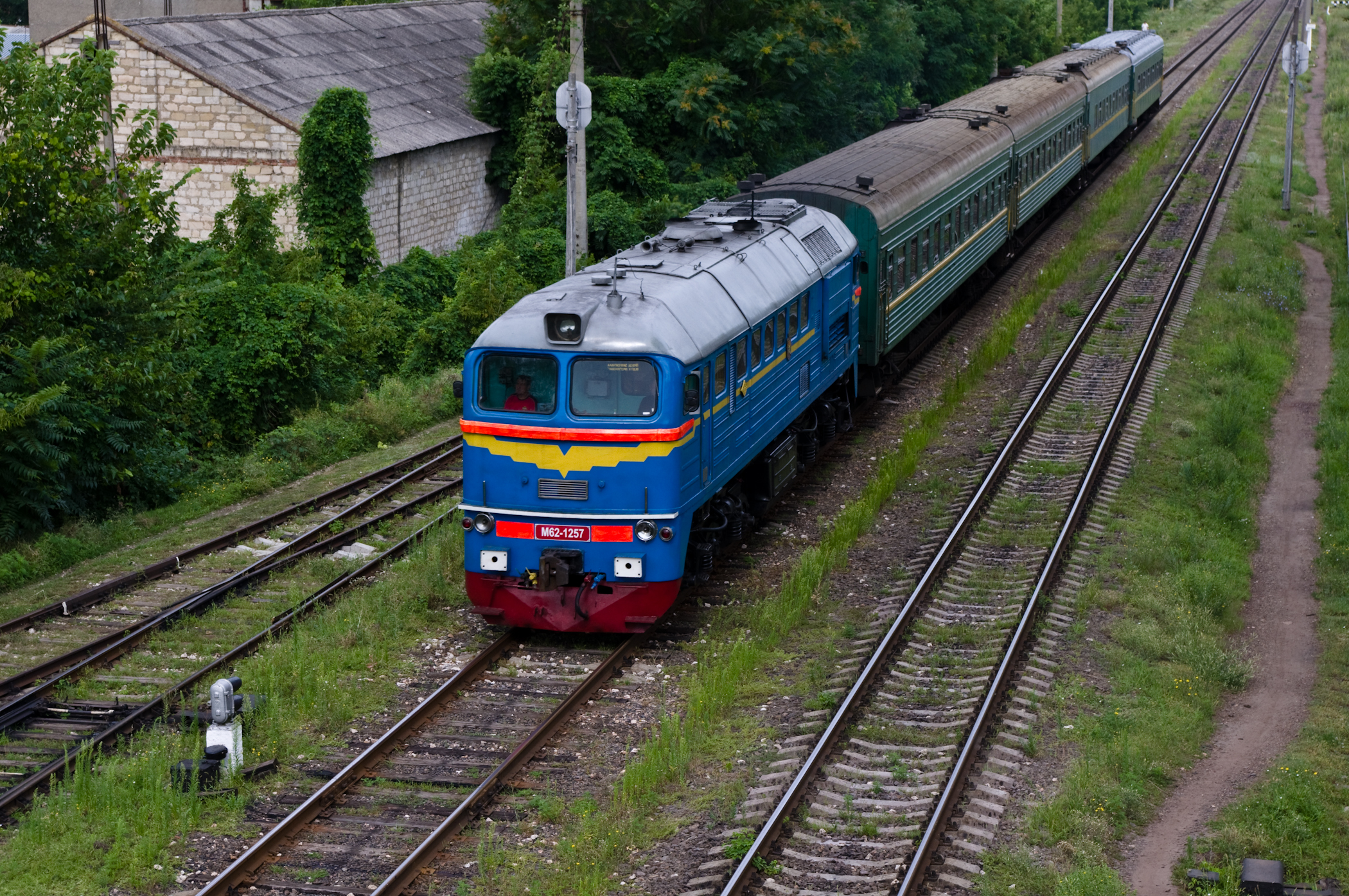
M62 locomotive.

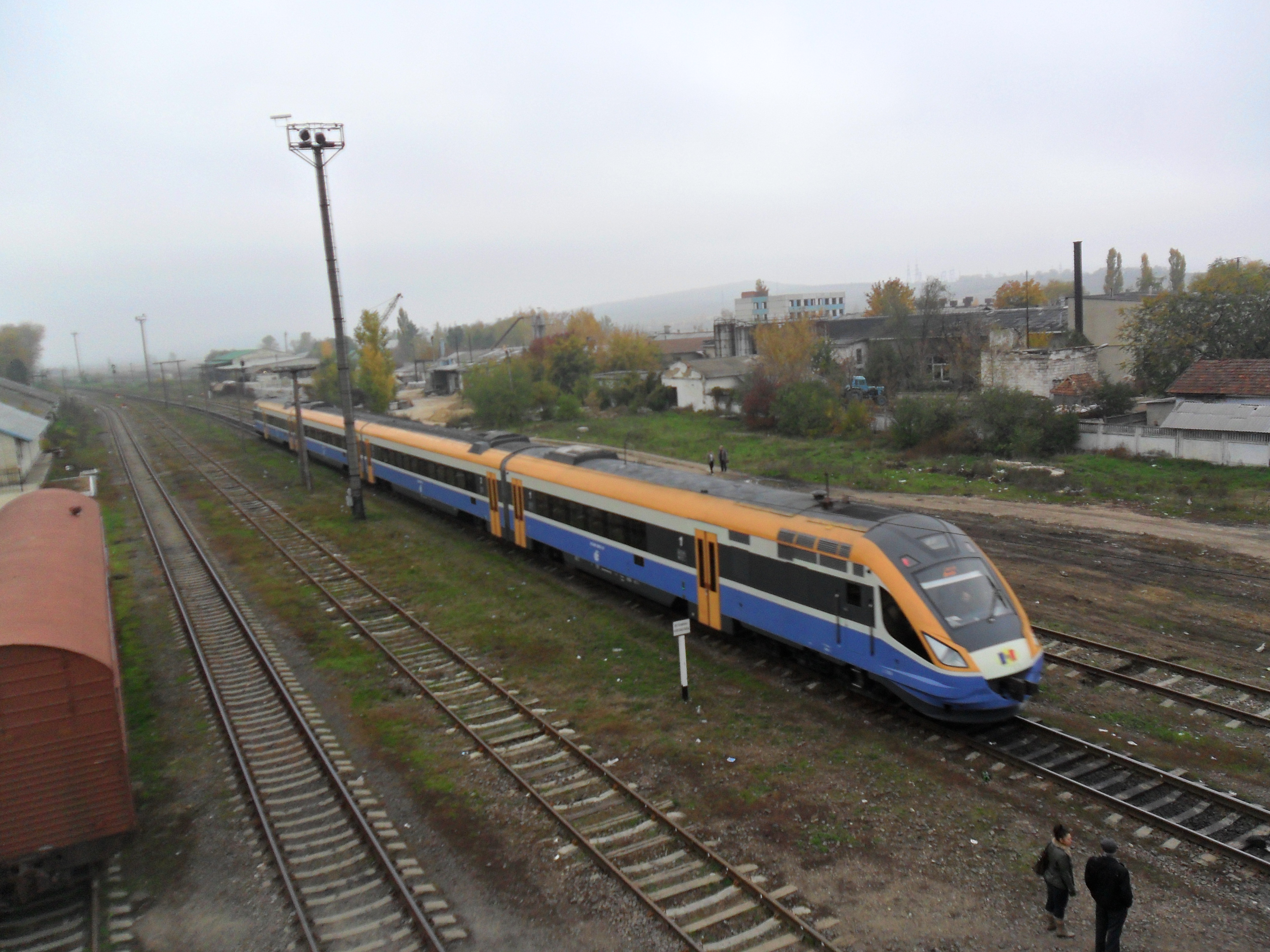
One of the rebuilt D1M DMUs at Strășeni railway station.

Most of the rolling stock used by CFM was manufactured in the USSR and other countries of the Soviet bloc. The most widespread type of traction unit is Soviet-built triple section 3TE10M (sometimes only 1 or 2 sections are used). Their use in Moldova was motivated by steep gradients on some portions of the rail network (especially, in the regions with hilly terrains), where additional power was needed to pull heavy freight trains. Other popular types of locomotives are M62 ("Mashka") and 2TE10L. Sometimes, Czech-built shunters ChME3 are used as traction units for local passenger operations.

The only type of DMU operated by CFM is D1, manufactured by Hungarian Ganz-MAVAG. However, in 2012 it underwent complete modernization (as D1M) at the Electroputere VFU factory in Romania, with most of the parts changed, including the installation of a new engine by Volvo. In addition, the refurbished units were equipped with an air conditioning system, wireless internet access points, and disability access ramps. The cost of the work is 2.2 million euros per unit. Overall, 15 units are expected to be rebuilt at the Remar factory. The first unit became the subject of significant controversy, as it was put into service before the renovation process was completed, in particular, the old gearbox was not changed, which resulted in the malfunctioning of the train. As of May 2013, the rebuilt train, with the optimized gearbox, was operating on the Chișinău-Odesa line.

In November 2018, CFM ordered 12 TE33A locomotives from GE Transportation for delivery in 2020. The locomotives were delivered in July 2020.

== Political involvement ==
CFM personnel largely consist of Russian speakers, Russian being the language used in the process of operation. Notably, CFM chief executive Miron Gagauz, who held the post of the Minister of Transportation, was one of the few members of the Government who did not speak the official language of the country. Historically, CFM has had good relations with the Communist Party of Moldova. In 2009, its employees signed a letter in which they condemned the opposition protests that followed the 2009 parliamentary elections. They described the events as "an attempt to bring chaos into the country and to destroy everything positive that was built by the current government", claimed that "the elections were carried out in conformity with the international norms and national law on elections" and "the victory of the communists is a logical result of their eight-year stay in power", expressed "full support to the elected power", and called for "punishing the responsible". Eventually, after the defeat of the PCRM in the national elections, the management of the enterprise was changed.

== Rail links to adjacent countries ==
Between Moldova and Romania there is a break-of-gauge (Romania employing standard gauge). The most important crossing (including gauge changing equipment) is Ungheni-Iași, another two are Cantemir-Falciu and Giurgiulești-Galați.

International passenger trains run to Bucharest, Iași, Kyiv, and Odesa. International services used to run to Saint Petersburg and Moscow.

== Gallery ==
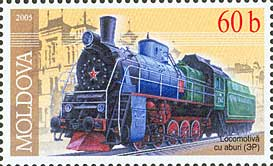
Steam locomotive stamp (ЭR)

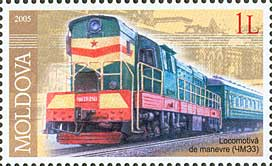
Shunting railway engine stamp (ЧМЭЗ)

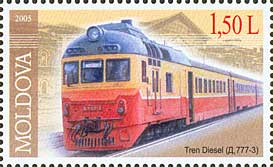
Diesel multiple unit stamp (Dl 777-3)

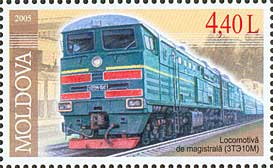
Mainline railway engine stamp(3ТЭ10М)

== See also ==
- Transport in Moldova
