= 2TE25K =

Russian diesel-electric locomotive

2TE25K/3TE25K2M/3TE25K3M
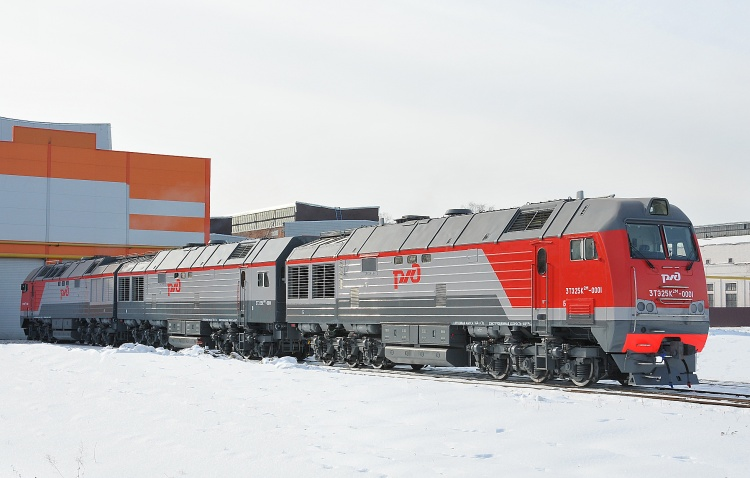
Type and origin
- Power type: Diesel-electric
- Build date: 2005–2022
- Total produced: 938 2ТE25К: 15; 2ТE25К^{М}: 781; 2ТE25К^{2М}: 1; 3ТE25К^{2М}: 139; 2ТE25К^{3М}: 1 3ТE25К^{3М}: 1
Specifications
- Configuration
  - UIC: Co-Co+Co-Co(for 2TE25K2M); Co-Co+Co-Co+Co-Co(for 3TE25K2M and 3TE25K3M)
- Gauge: 1,520 mm (4 ft 11 27/32 in)
- Loco weight: 144 t (142 long tons; 159 short tons) per unit 288 t (283 long tons; 317 short tons) total
- Prime mover: 2TE25K : D49 12CHN26/26 2TE25KM : 5D49 16CHN26/26; 2TE25K2M : GEVO-12; 3TE25K2M : GEVO-12 2/3TE25K3M : 5D49 16CHN26/26
- Engine type: 4-stroke, V12 diesel
Performance figures
- Maximum speed: 110 km/h (68 mph)
- Power output: 2,500 kW (3,353 hp) per unit 5,000 kW (6,705 hp) total 2TE25K2M 3,100 kW (4,157 hp) per unit 9,300 kW (12,472 hp) total 3TE25K2M
Career
- Number in class: 502
- Nicknames: Peresvet

The 2TE25K is a main line two-unit diesel-electric locomotive, rated at 5,000 kW (6,705 hp). It is equipped with AC/DC transmission and is designed to haul freight trains on the Russian Federation lines RZD on the broad gauge.

2TE25K diesel locomotive has been used as the basis of the 2TE25A class main line two-unit diesel freight locomotive of the same power rating and featuring AC/AC transmission and collector traction motors.

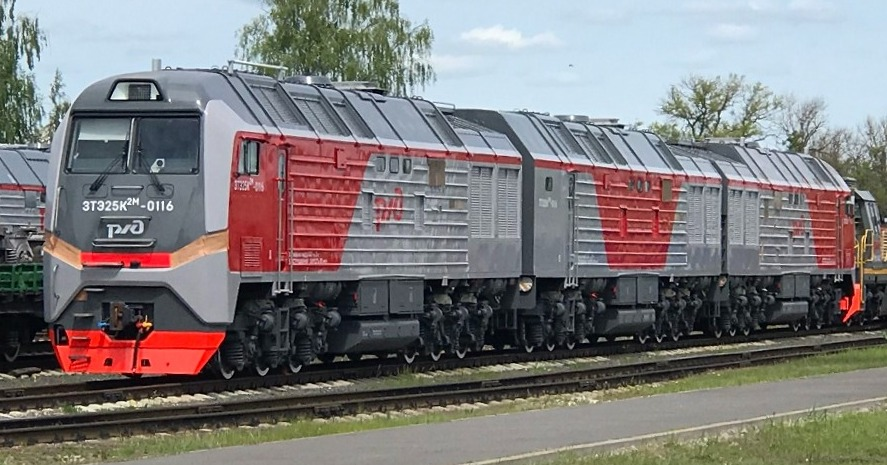
Тепловоз 3ТЭ25К^{2М}-0116

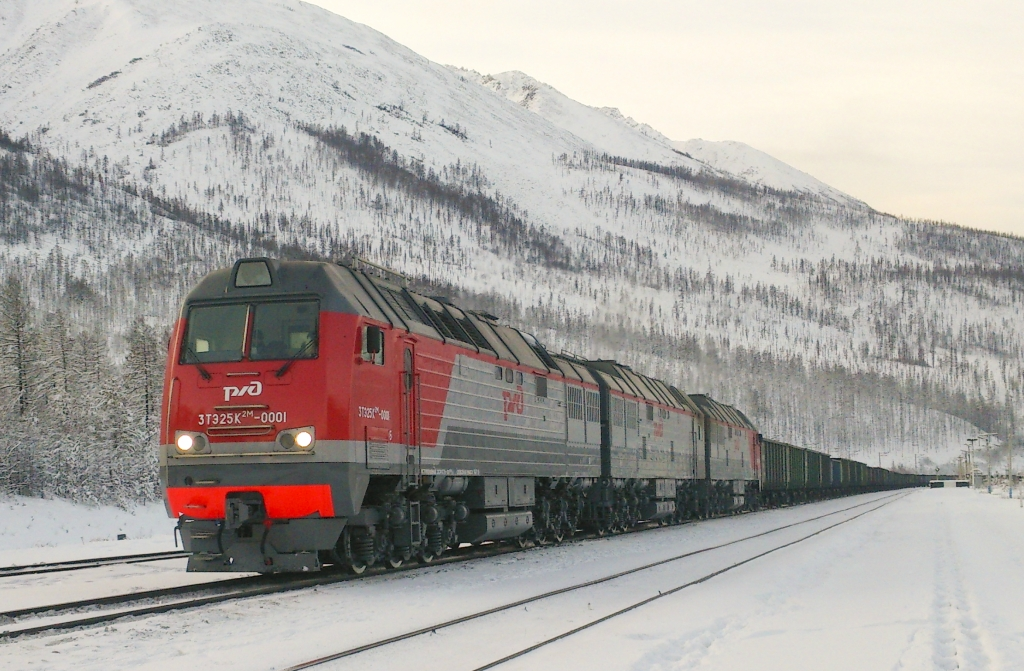
3TE25K2M-0001 hauled coal freight train

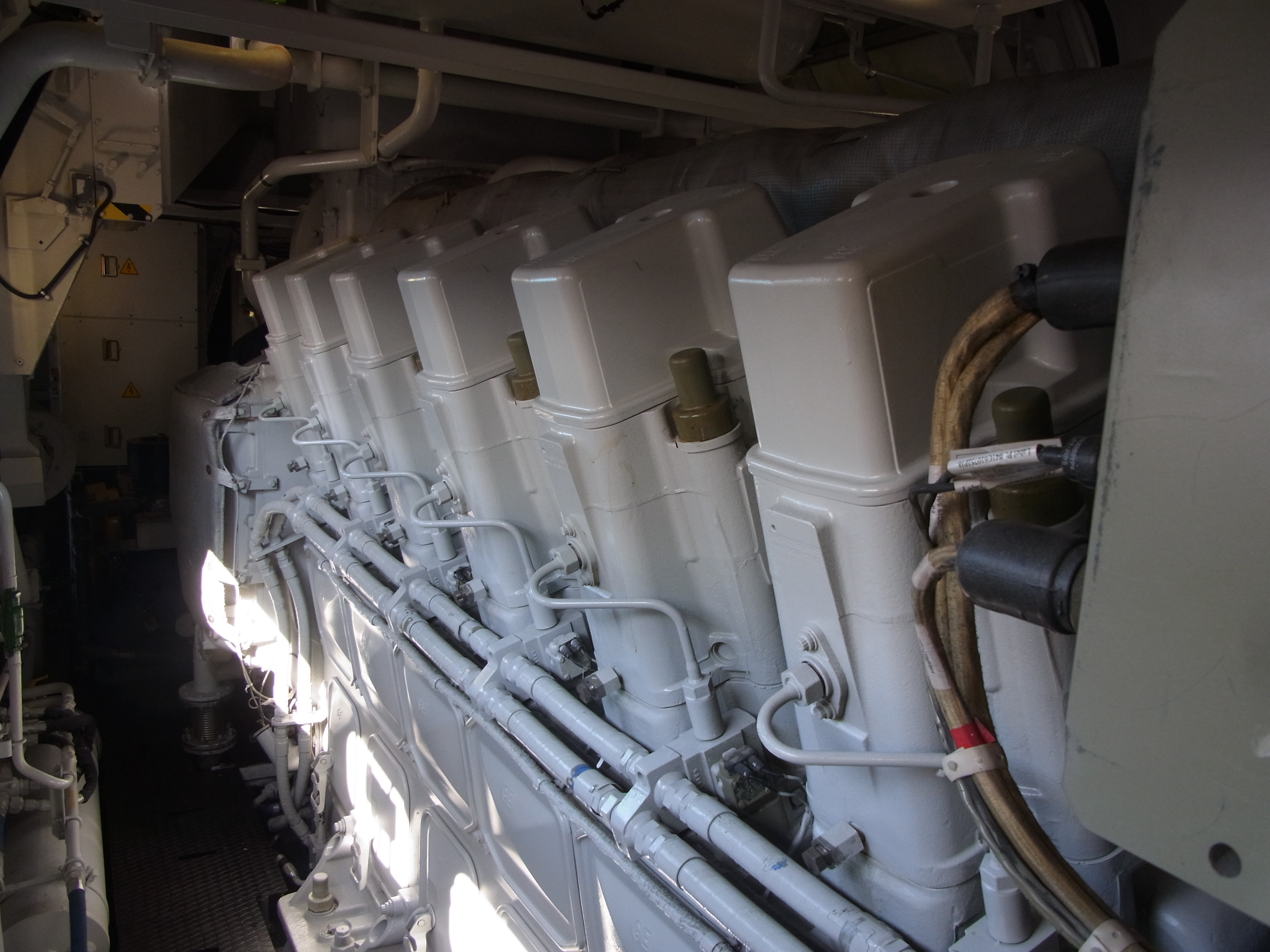
3TE25K2M GEVO-12 Prime Mover

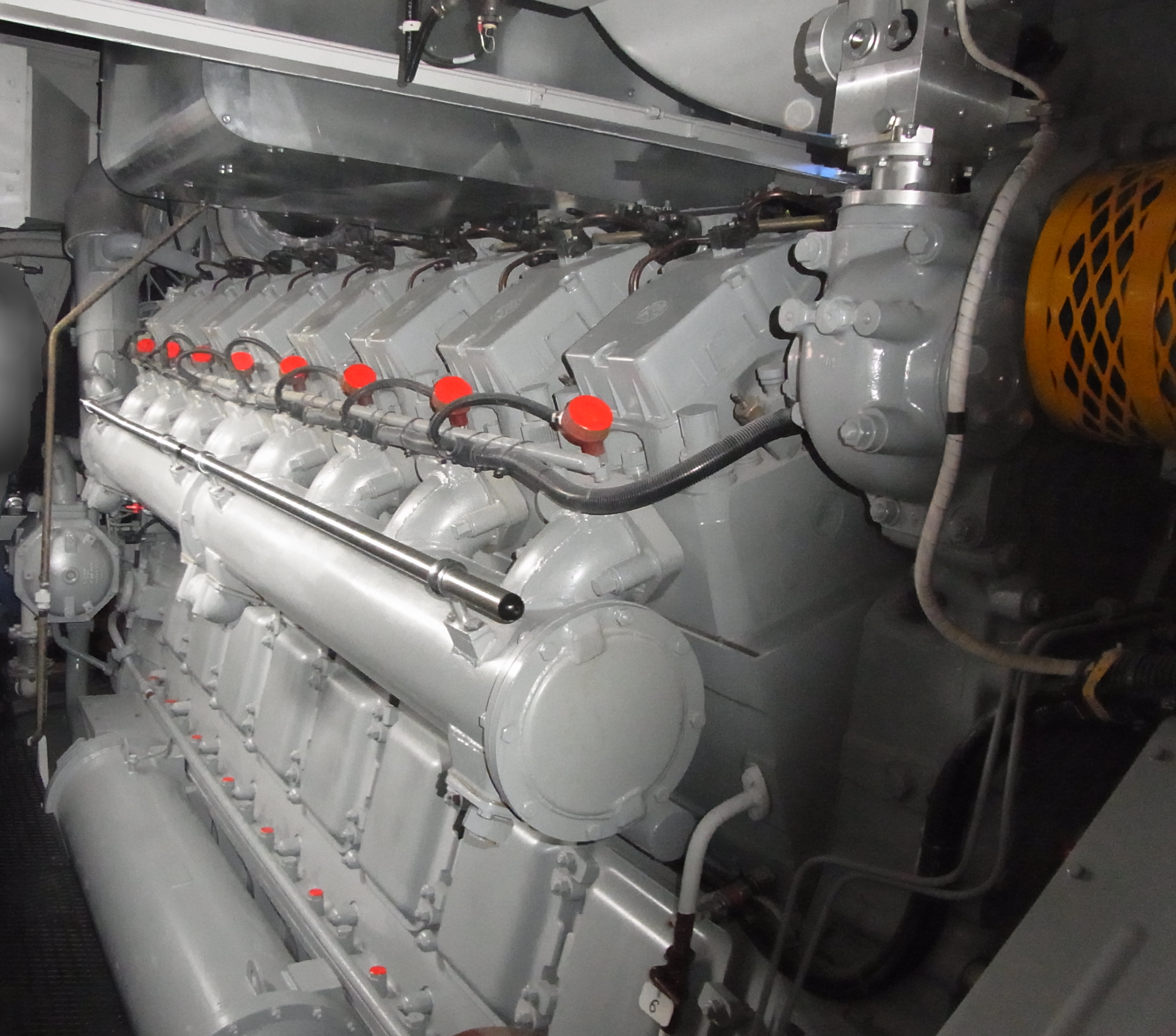
2TE25KM Kolomna 5D49 Prime Mover^{М}

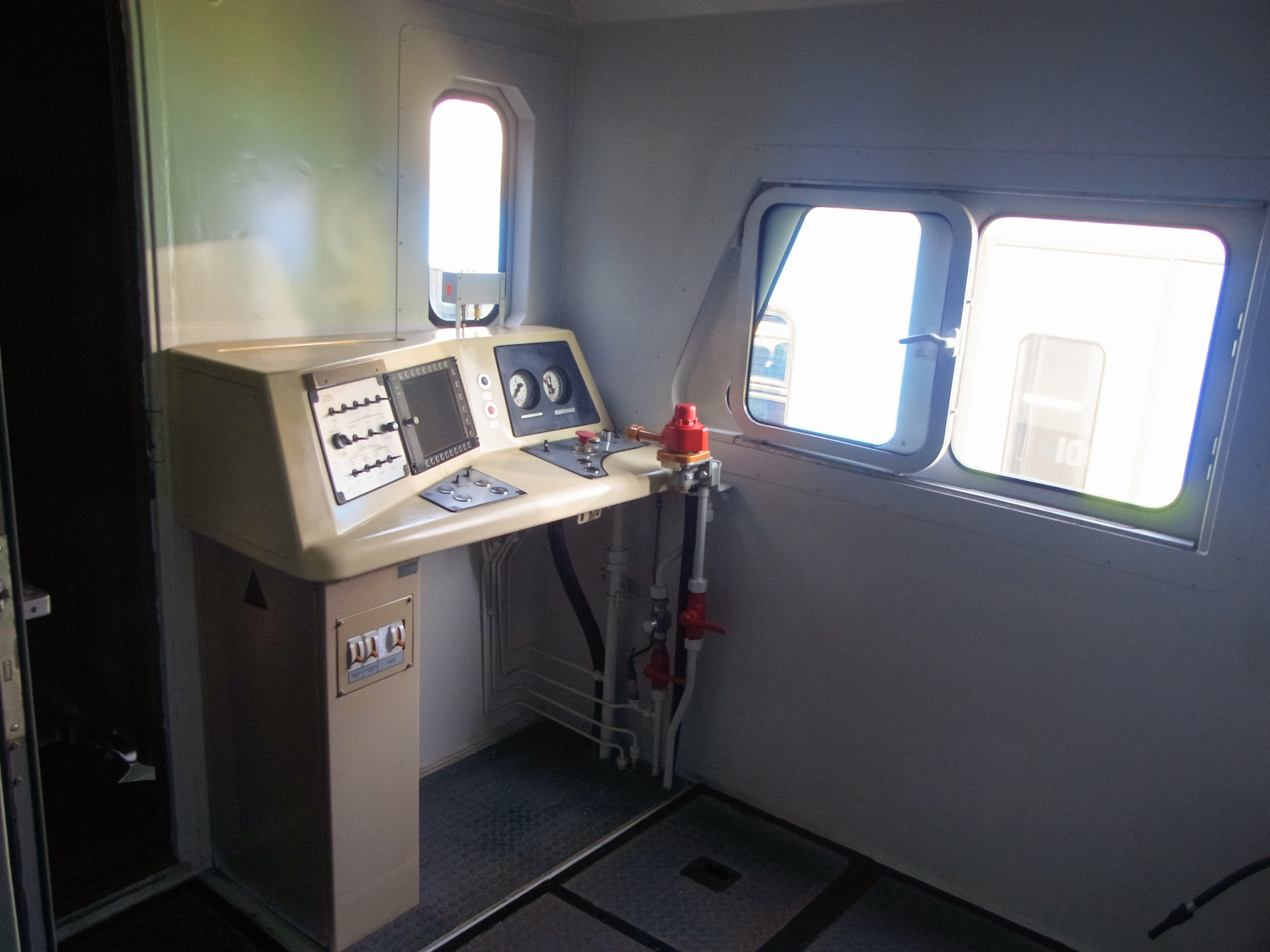
3TE25K2M Booster Cab Interior

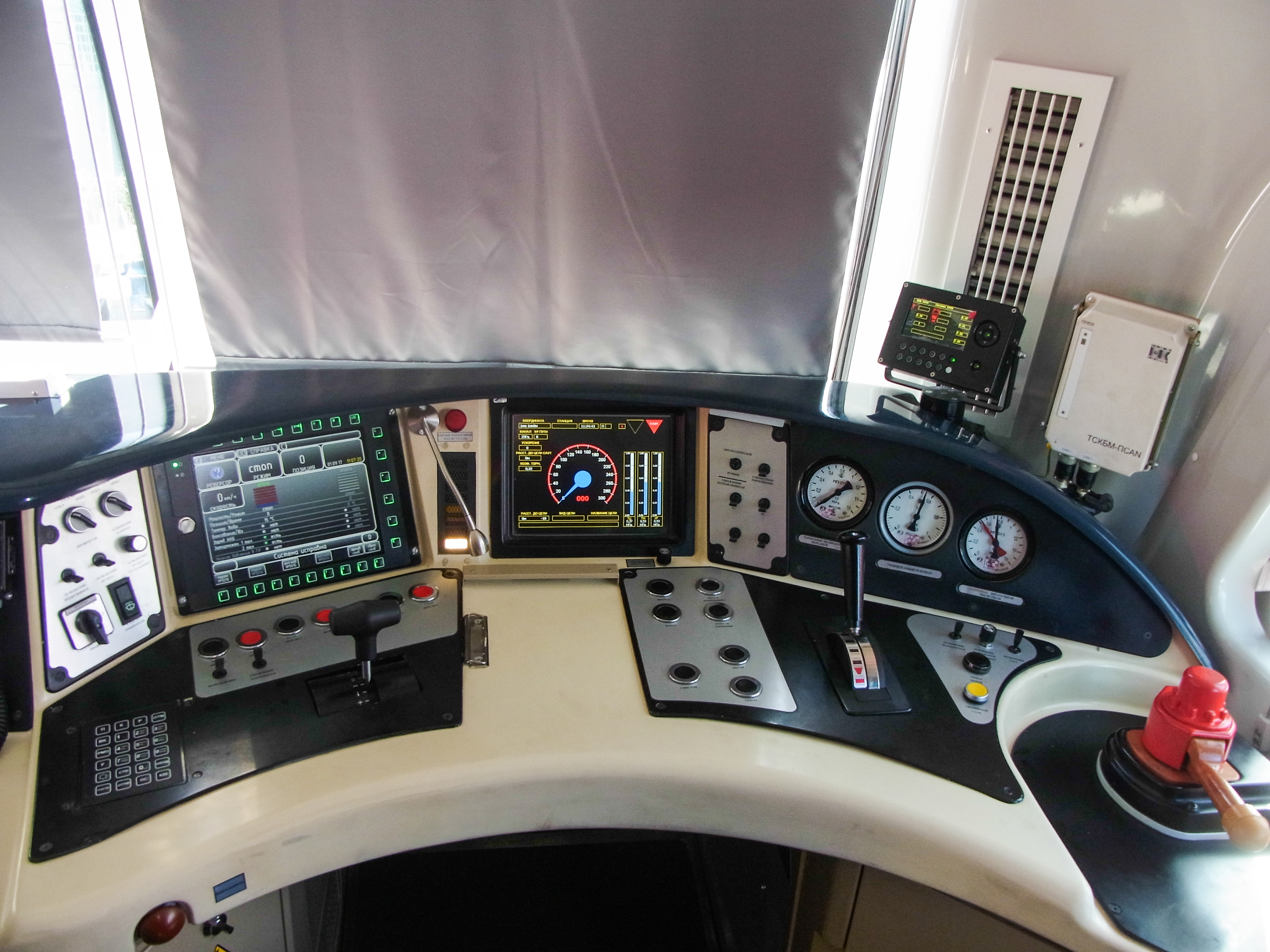
3TE25K2M front cabin control interior

From 2017 to 2020, twelve triple-unit 3TE25K2M locomotives rated at 9,300 kW (12,500 hp) have been supplied. These are now the most powerful diesel locomotives on Russian railways.

In 2022, in response to International sanctions during the Russian invasion of Ukraine resulting from the Russian invasion of Ukraine, Russian Railways announced that it would cease production of 2TE25K locomotives.

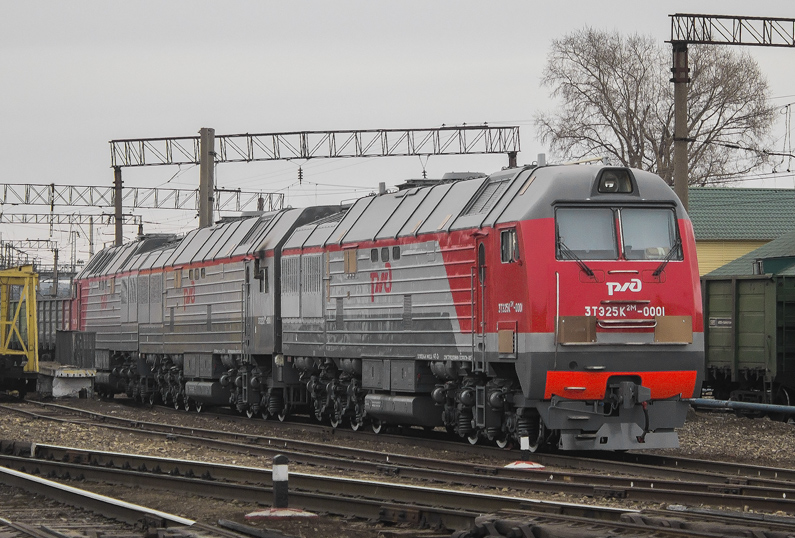
3TE25K2M-0001 at Yudino Station

The new 3TE28 locomotive, which doesn't use the American technology of the 2TE25K, began production in 2023.

== See also ==
- The Museum of the Moscow Railway, at Paveletsky Rail Terminal, Moscow
- Rizhsky Rail Terminal, Home of the Moscow Railway Museum
- Varshavsky Rail Terminal, St.Petersburg, Home of the Central Museum of Railway Transport, Russian Federation
- History of rail transport in Russia
