= Electroputere VFU =

Romanian company

Electroputere VFU S.A.
- Company type: Public: (BVB: RMAR)
- Industry: Rail
- Founded: 1869
- Headquarters: Pașcani, Romania
- Products: Rolling stock repair and construction
- Number of employees: 980
- Parent: Grup Feroviar Român
- Website: www.electroputerevfu.ro

Electroputere VFU (former Remar S.A.) is an industrial engineering and manufacturing company based in Pașcani, Iași County, Romania. The company is a leader in the Romanian spare parts segment.

== History ==
Founded in 1869, as Atelierele C.F.R. (C.F.R. Works) Pașcani, and later renamed Remar - „REparatii MAterial Rulant” (Rolling Stock Repairing), the company specialized in new construction, reconstruction, modernization and repairing of railway vehicles and spare parts manufacturing for rolling stock and related industries.

In 2004, after the privatization process, Remar Pașcani became part of Grup Feroviar Român. In 2013, the name was changed to Electroputere VFU.

== Products ==
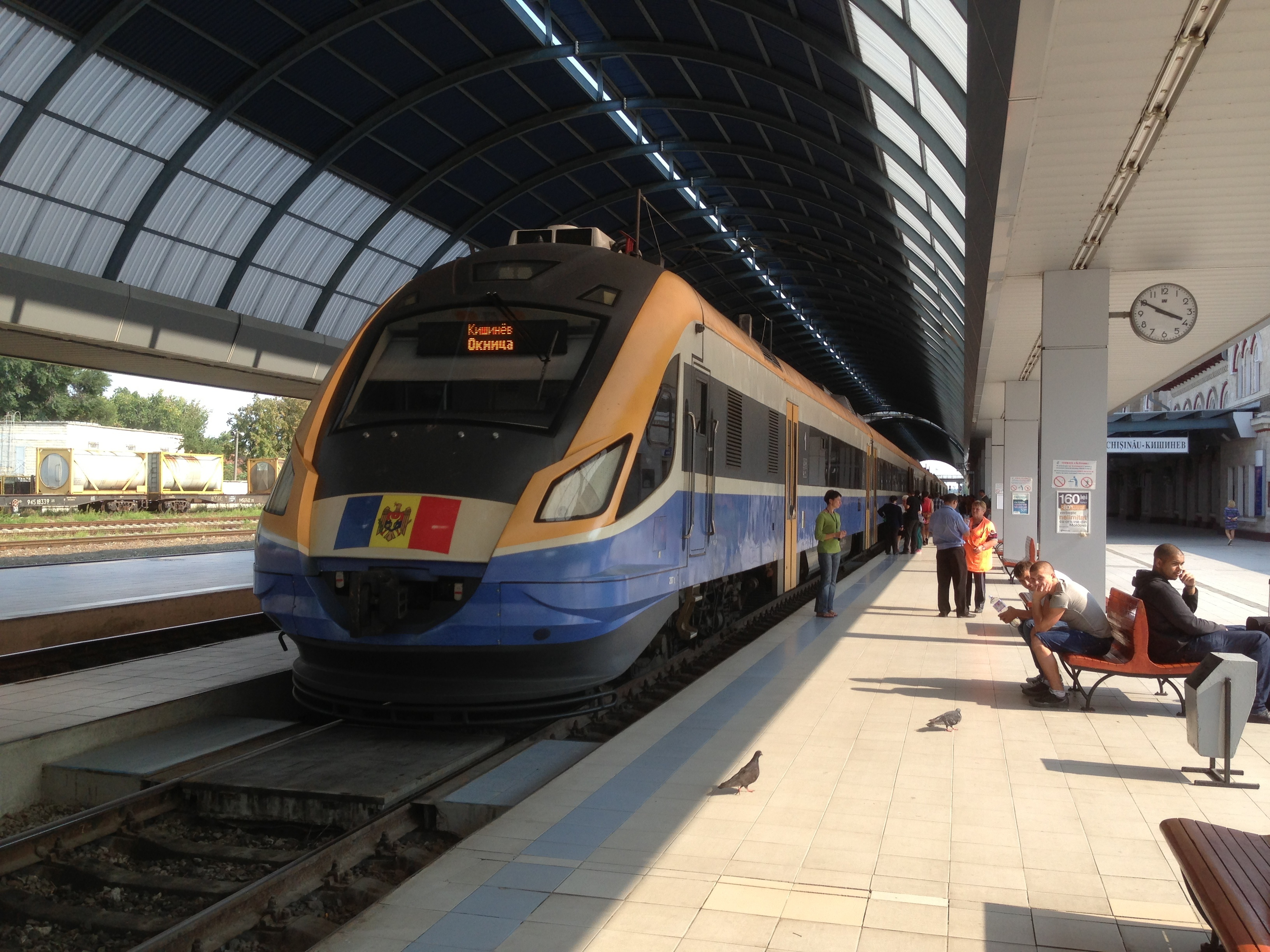
Rebuilt D1M DMU for Moldovan Railways

Electroputere VFU's concept of R&R („Redesign and Reconstruct”) was applied on more than 10 different projects for Diesel Multiple Units, passenger coaches (single or double deck, single unit or multiple units), trams and freight wagons. Recent contracts include:

- R&R on 30 GT4 trams (as GT4MT Armonia) for STP Timișoara (together with Astra Vagoane Arad)
- R8 type repairing on 57 Desiro DMUs for CFR Călători
- Ganz-MÁVAG D1M DMUs modernization and reconstruction program for Moldovan Railways
- Special platform wagon for a road crane transport (Gabon)
- Modernization and reconstruction of 20 passenger coaches for Setrag (Trans-Gabon Railway)
- Modernization of 115 passenger coaches for CFR Călători
