= 2TE25A =

Russian diesel freight locomotive

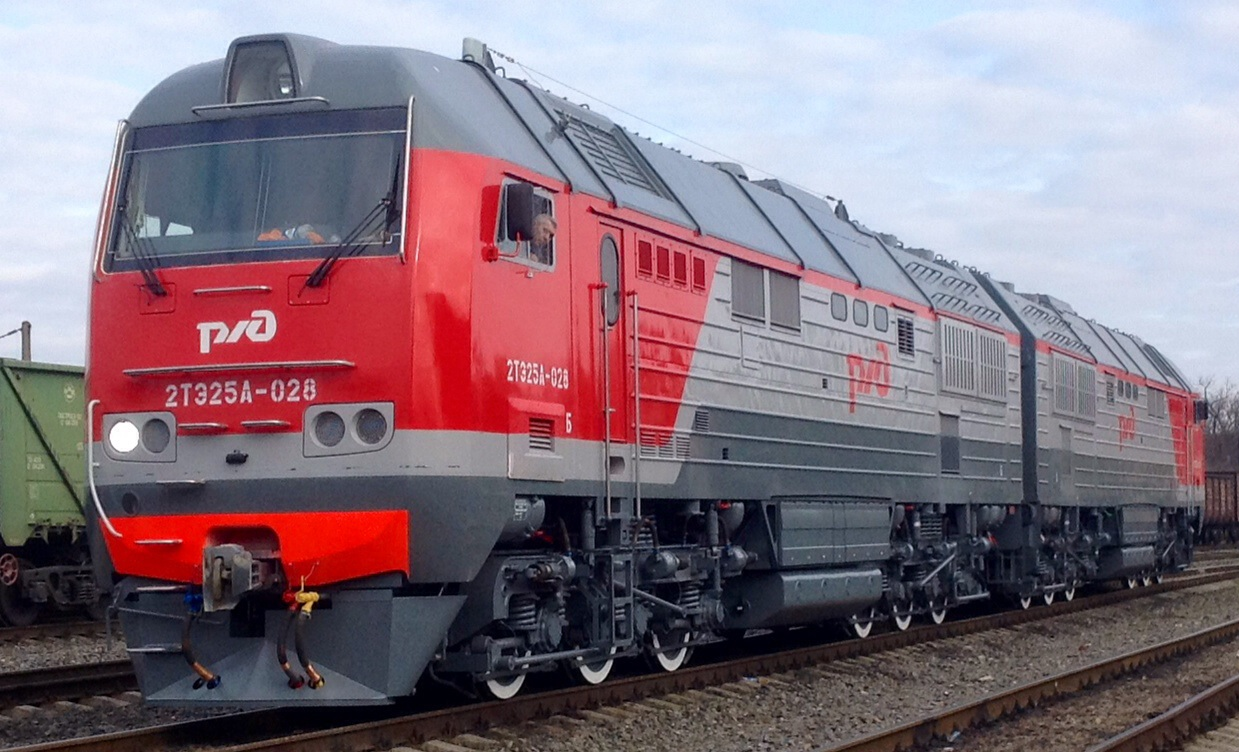
- 2TE25A-028
Type and origin
- Power type: Diesel-electric
- Builder: Bryansk Machine-Building Plant, Transmashholding, Russia
- Build date: from 2006
- Total produced: 52
Specifications
- Configuration
  - UIC: 2×(Co-Co)
- Gauge: 1,520 mm (4 ft 11 27/32 in)
- Loco weight: 144 t (142 long tons; 159 short tons) per unit 288 t (283 long tons; 317 short tons) total
- Prime mover: Kolomna Engineering Works 2D49 type
- Engine type: 4-stroke, V12 EFI equipped diesel
- Traction motors: DAT-470 (asynchronous)
- Safety systems: КЛУБ-У (KLUB-U, Complex locomotive safety system), МСУД (MSUD, Microprocessor control and diagnostics)
Performance figures
- Maximum speed: 120 km/h (75 mph)
- Power output: 2,500 kW (3,353 hp) per unit 5,000 kW (6,705 hp) total
Career
- Operators: RŽD, Türkmendemirýollary
- Nicknames: Vityaz

The 2TE25A Is a main line two-unit diesel freight locomotive, rated at 5,000 kW (6,705 hp), with AC/AC transmission and individual axle traction control, is designed to haul freight trains on the Russian Federation lines RŽD with the broad gauge.

2TE25A diesel locomotive has been configured on the basis of the previously developed 2TE25K class Peresvet main line two-unit diesel freight locomotive of the same power rating and featuring AC/DC transmission and collector traction motors.

- Starting tractive effort — 2×441 kN
- Continuous tractive effort — 2×390 kN

== See also ==
- History of rail transport in Russia
- 2ES10, EP20 - another Russian new generation locomotives in serial production.
