= Kherson railway station =

Main railway station in the Ukrainian city of Kherson

Kherson Херсон
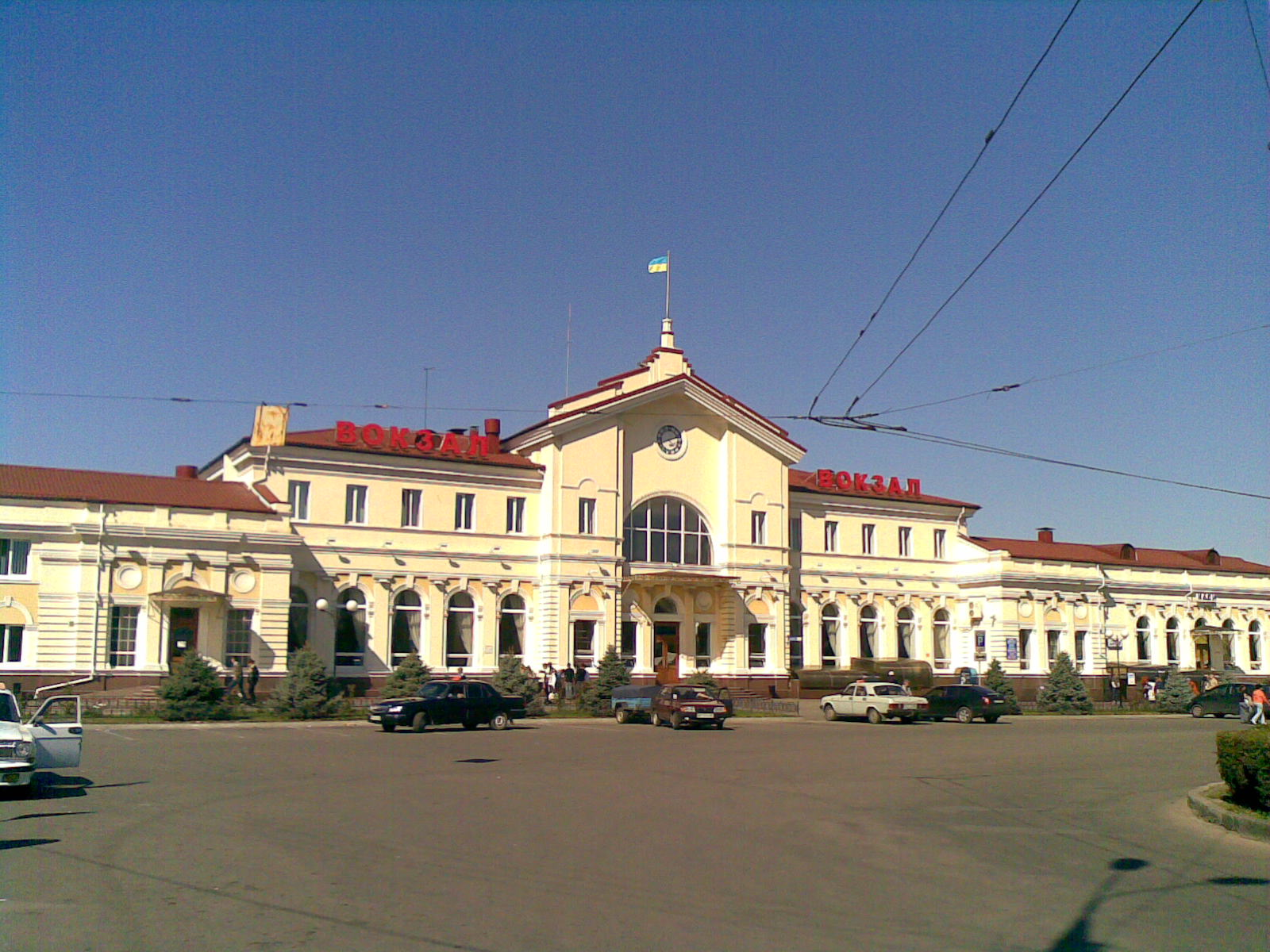
- Front view of the railway station

General information
- Location: 3-A Privolzalna Sq, Kherson, Kherson Raion; Kherson Oblast, Ukraine
- Coordinates: 46°39′22″N 32°36′17″E
- System: Odesa Railways station
- Operator: Odesa Railways
- Distance: 580 kilometres (360 mi) from Kyiv
- Platforms: 3

Other information
- Station code: 417804

History
- Opened: 1907

Services
| Preceding station | Ukrainian Railways | Following station |
|---|---|---|
| Chornobaivka toward Mykolaiv | Mykolaiv–Kherson | Terminus |
| Terminus | Kherson–Snihurivka | Galahanivka toward Snihurivka |
| Terminus | Kherson–Dzhankoi Suspended | Oleshki toward Dzhankoi |
Location

The Kherson railway station (Ukrainian: Станція Херсон) is the main railway station in the Ukrainian city of Kherson. It first opened in 1907, and is currently operated by Odesa Railways.

== History ==
The station was built in 1907 as part of an extension to the Kharkiv-Mykolaiv rail line. This extension opened in October 1907.

On November 11, 1915, Tsar Nicholas II visited the station with his heir Alexis.

=== Russian invasion of Ukraine ===
On February 24, 2022, all train service from the station halted with the Russian invasion of Ukraine.

Following the Liberation of Kherson in November 2022, Ukrainian Railways and United24 launched "Tickets to Victory" in Kherson station to sell charity tickets and help raise funds for the Armed Forces of Ukraine. On November 19, train service in Kherson resumed, with the first train headed for Kyiv.

On May 3, 2023, Russian forces shelled the station, killing one and injuring three others. Two trains leaving for Lviv and Mykolaiv were delayed, but both arrived safely.

On December 26, 2023, Russian troops again shelled Kherson's train station, mainly to target an oncoming train for evacuating civilians. A policeman died and 16 were wounded as a result of this attack.

On May 8, 2024, Russian troops shelled the station and damaged the infrastructure. There were no reports of casualties.

== Gallery ==
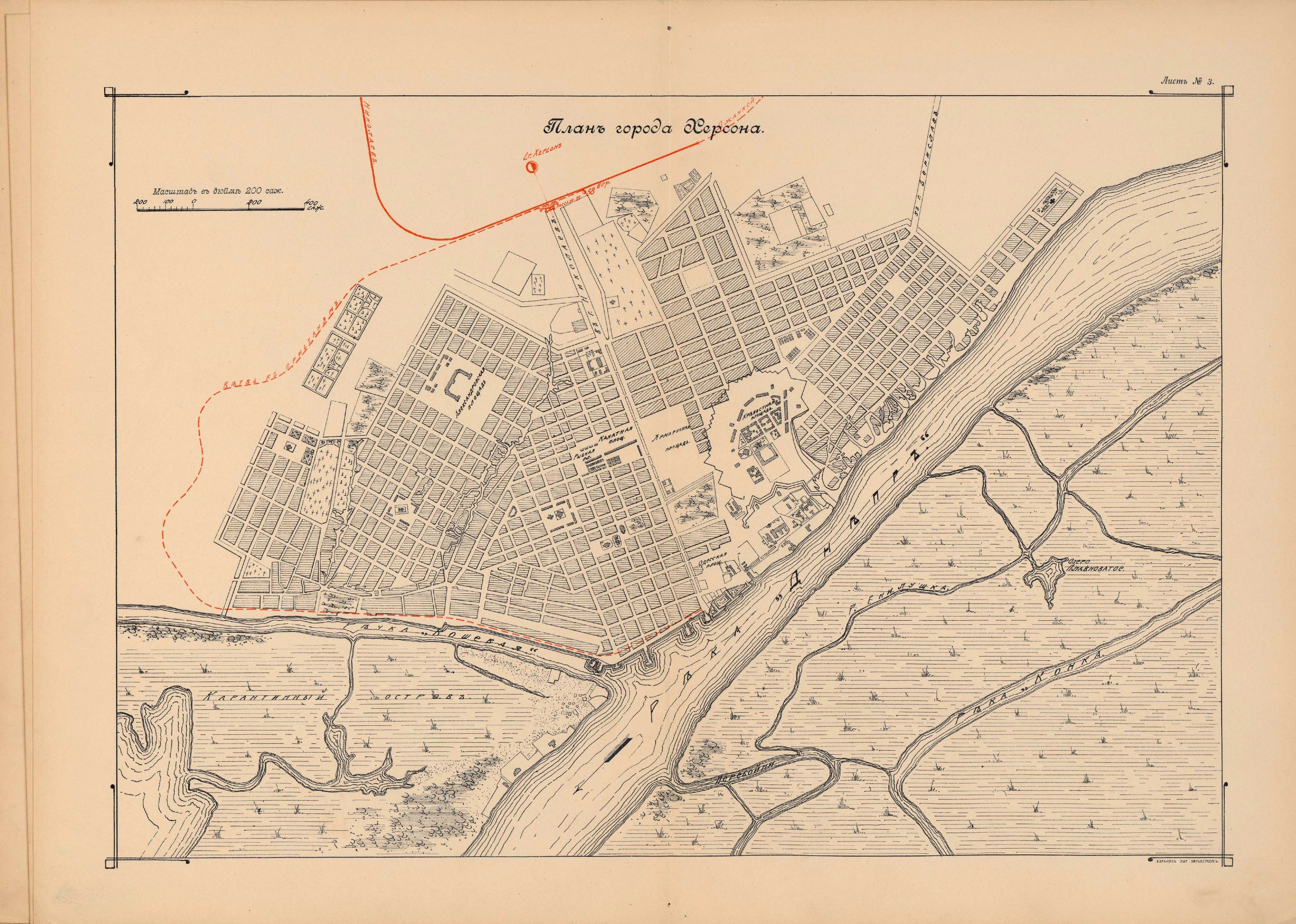

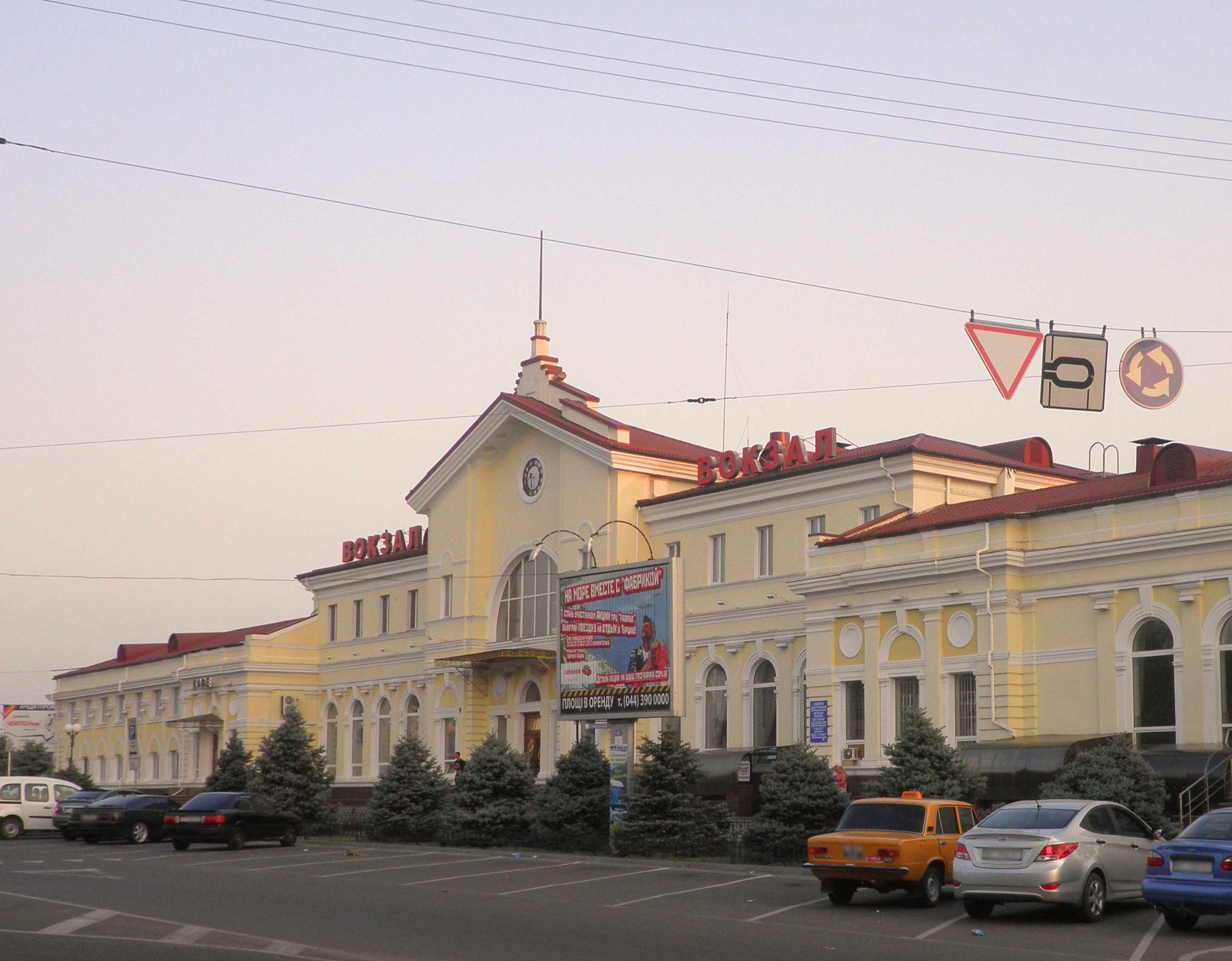

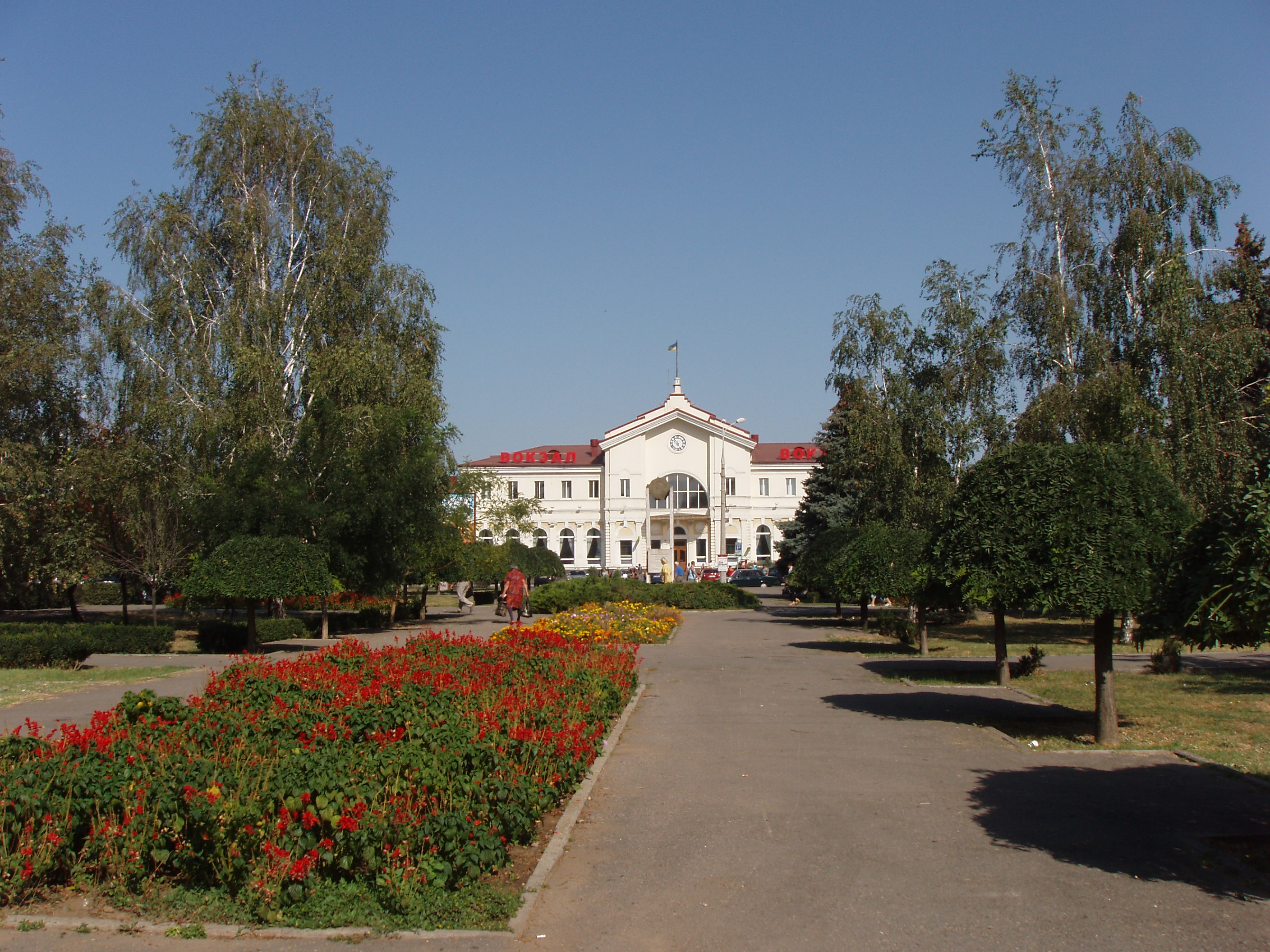

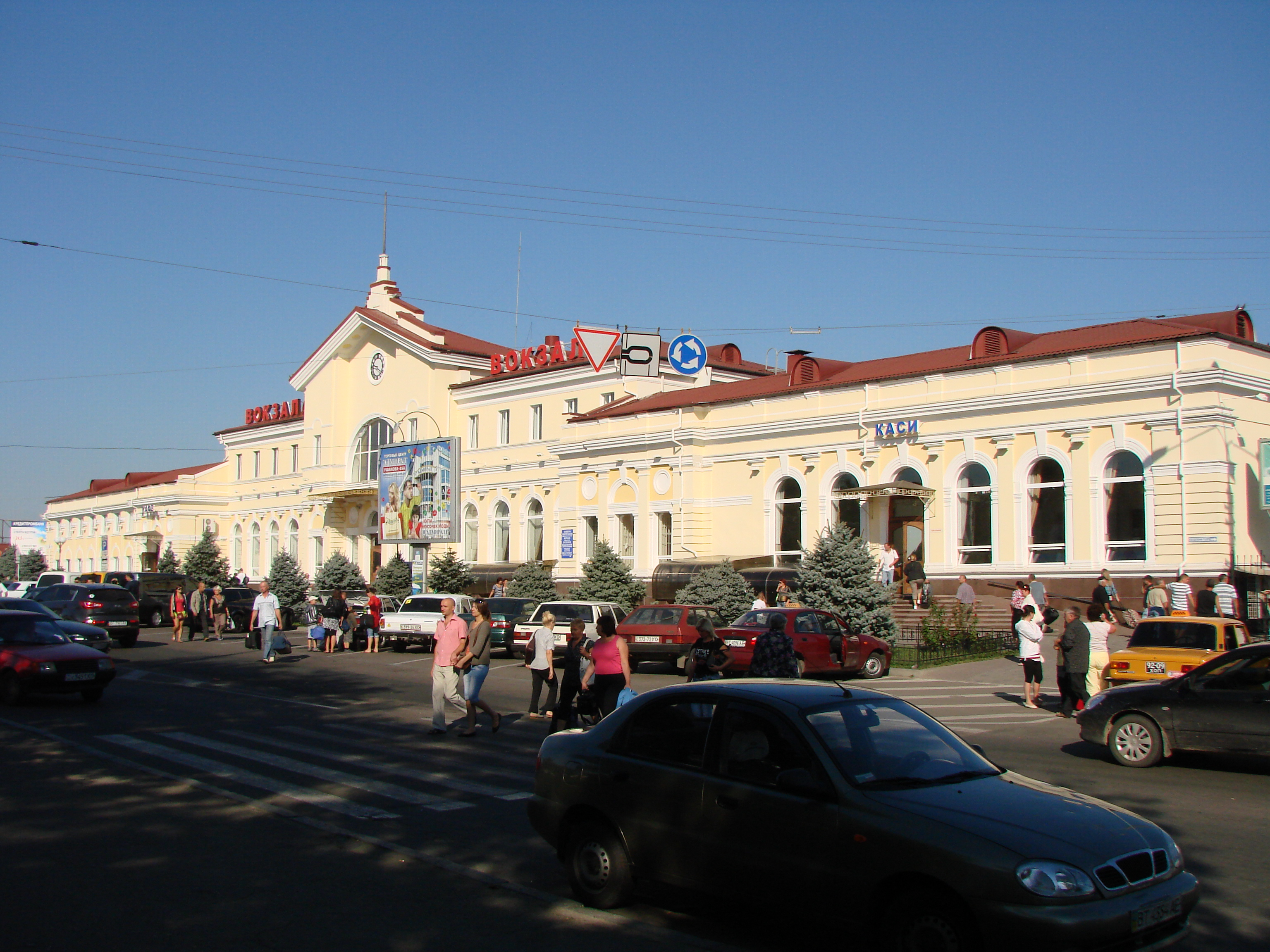

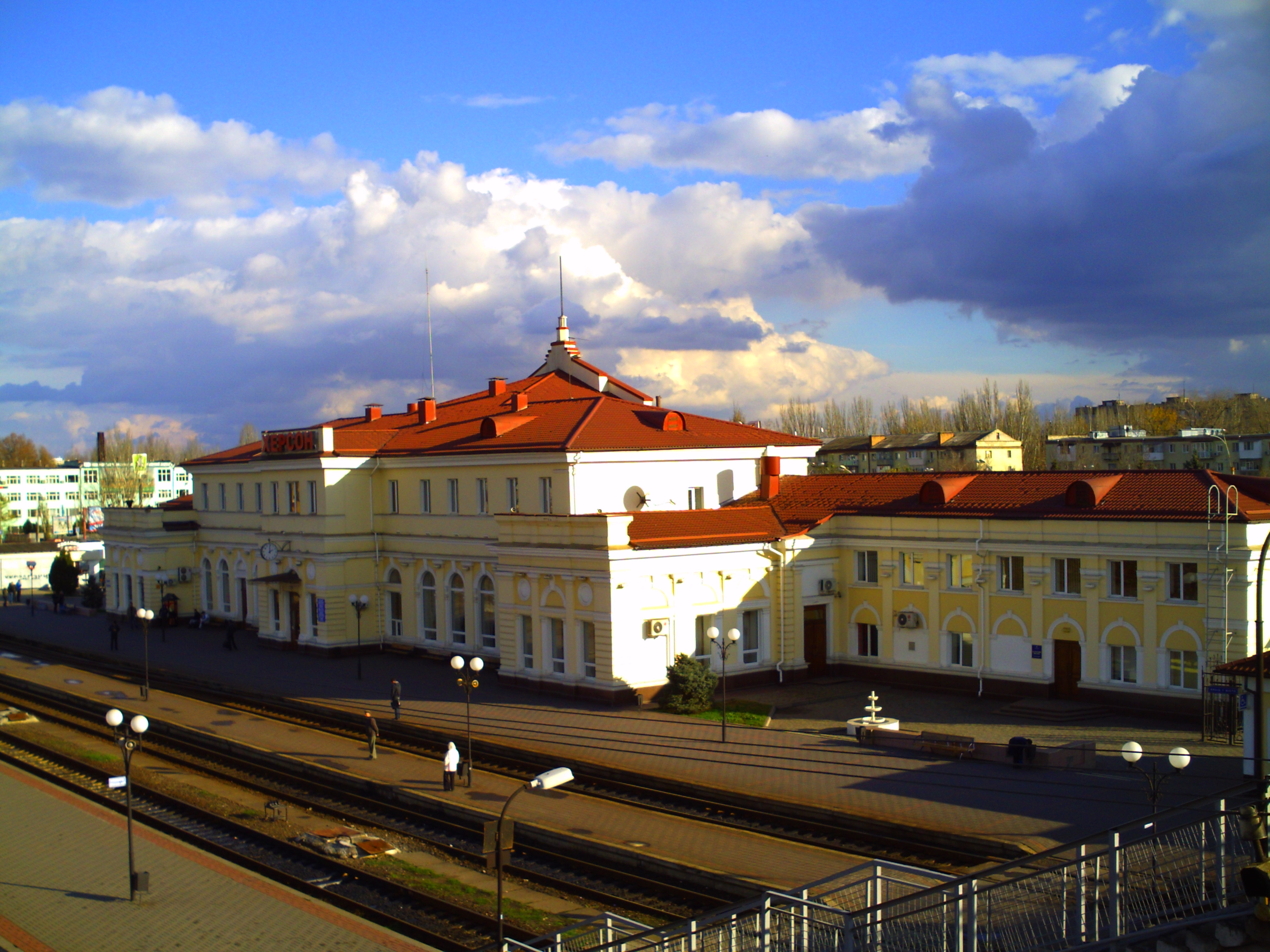

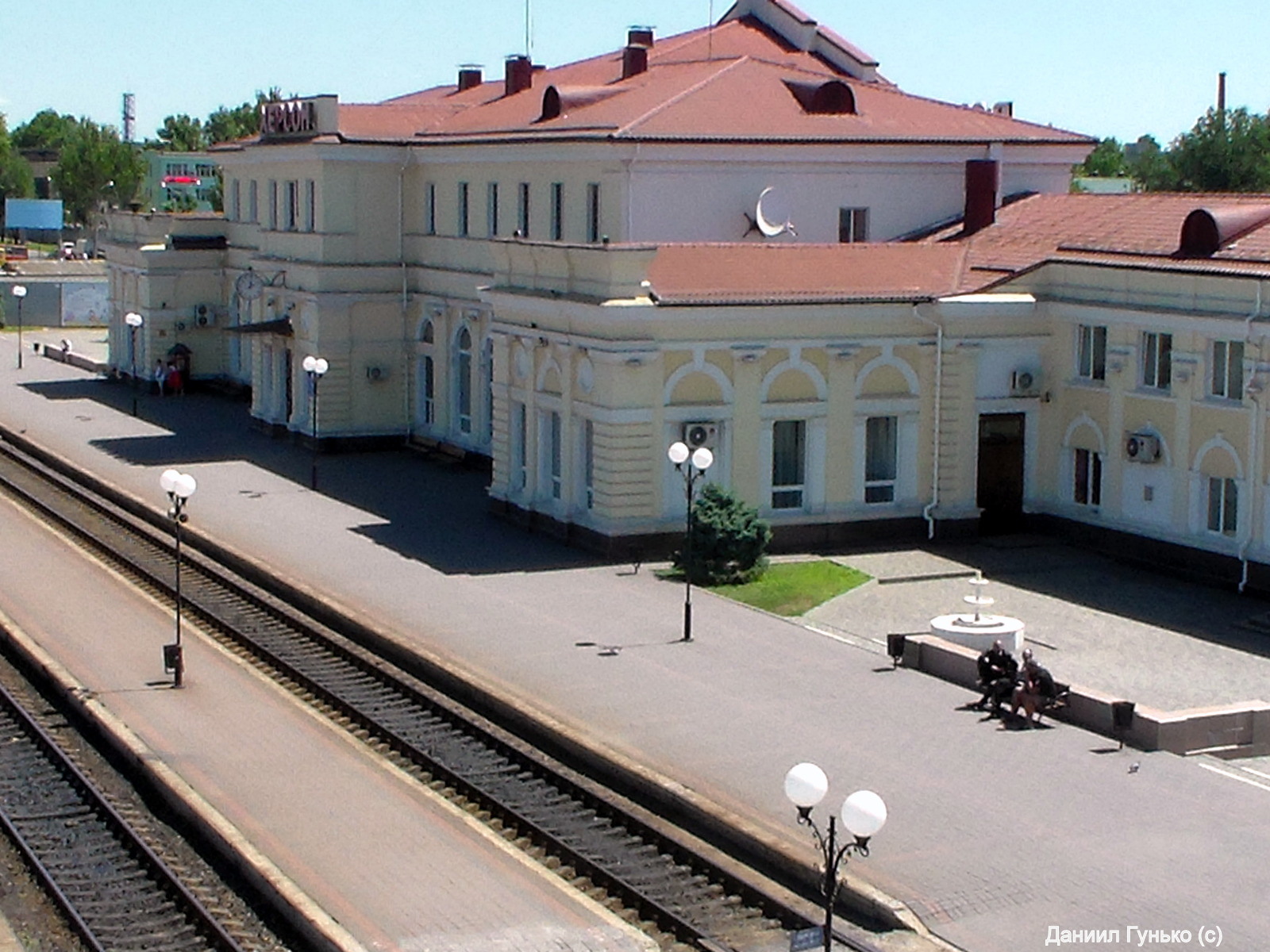

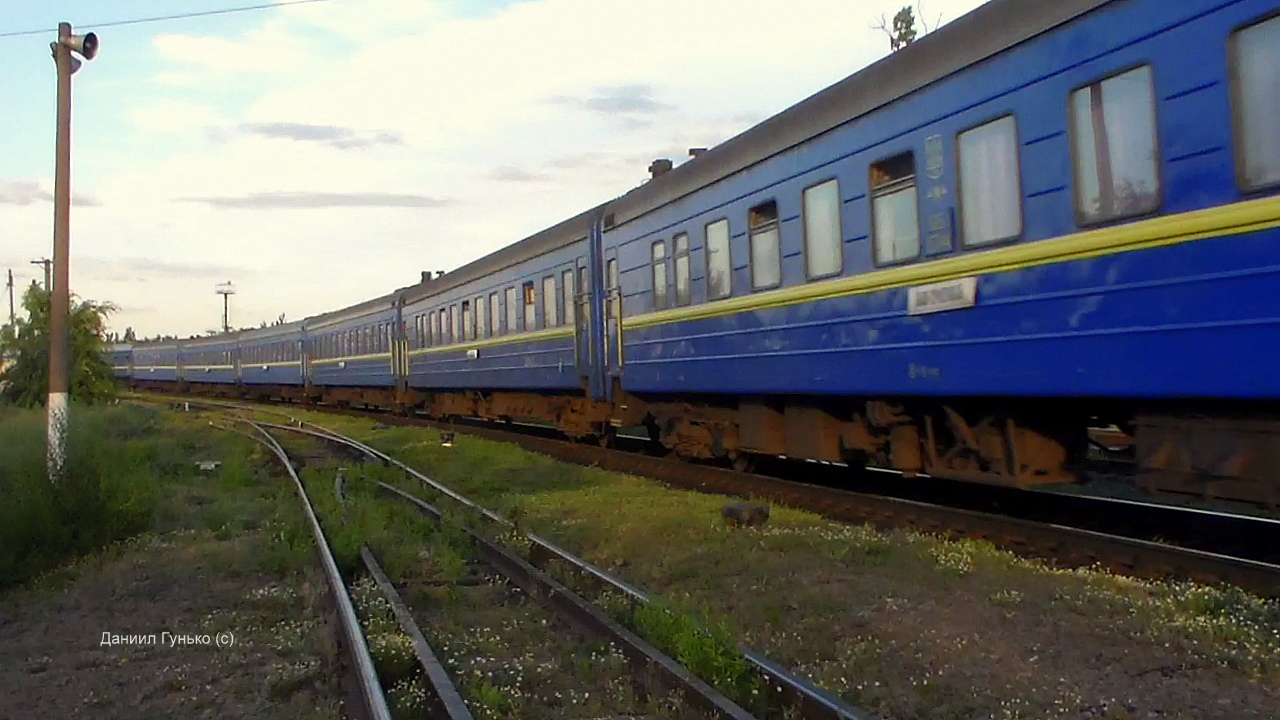

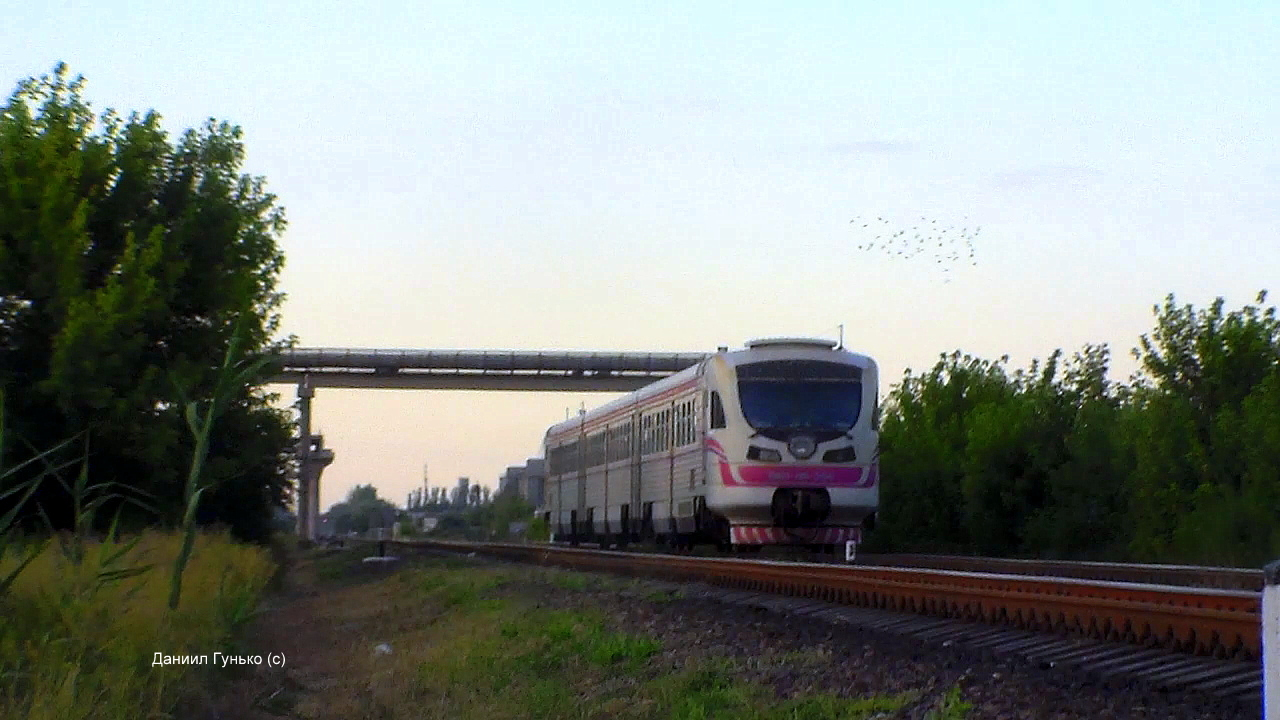

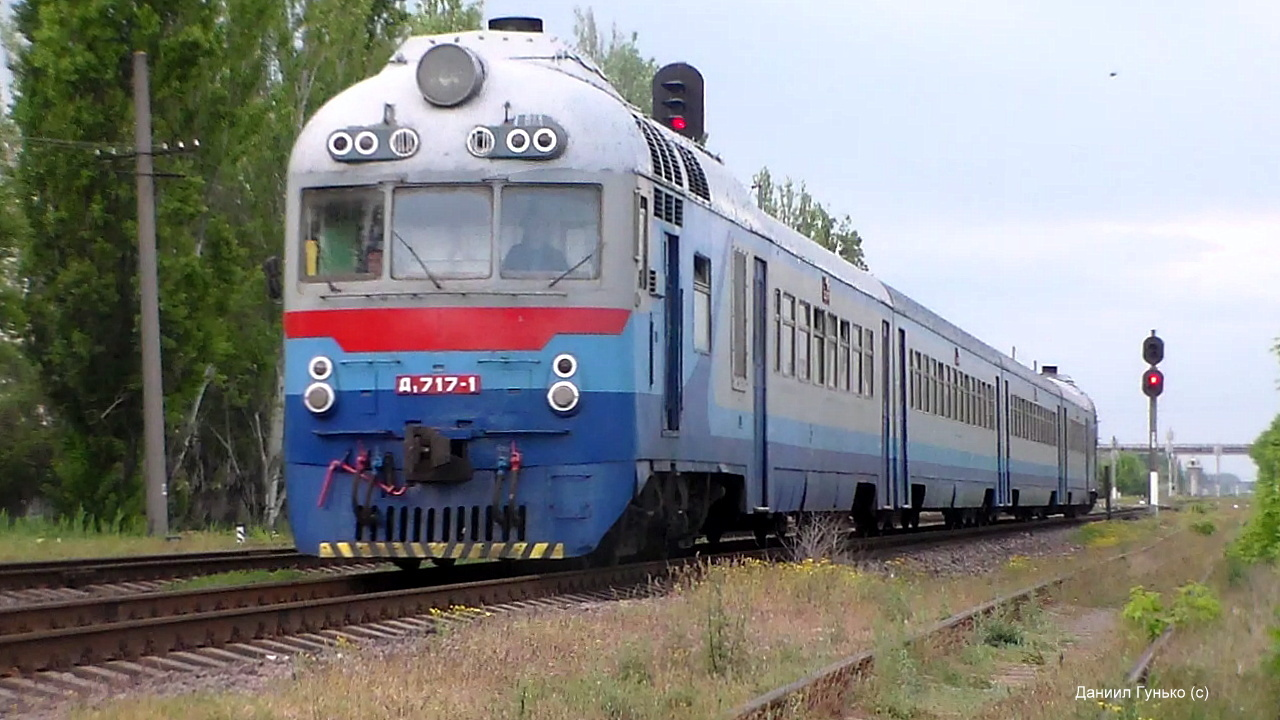

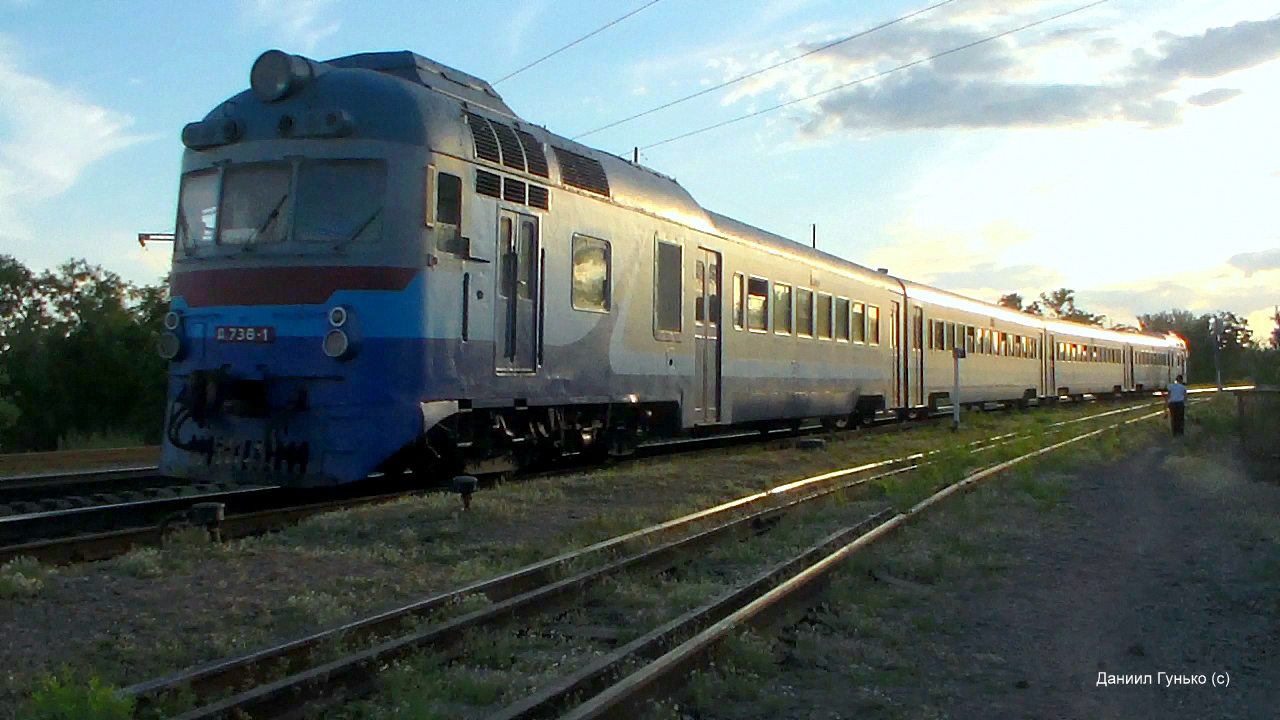

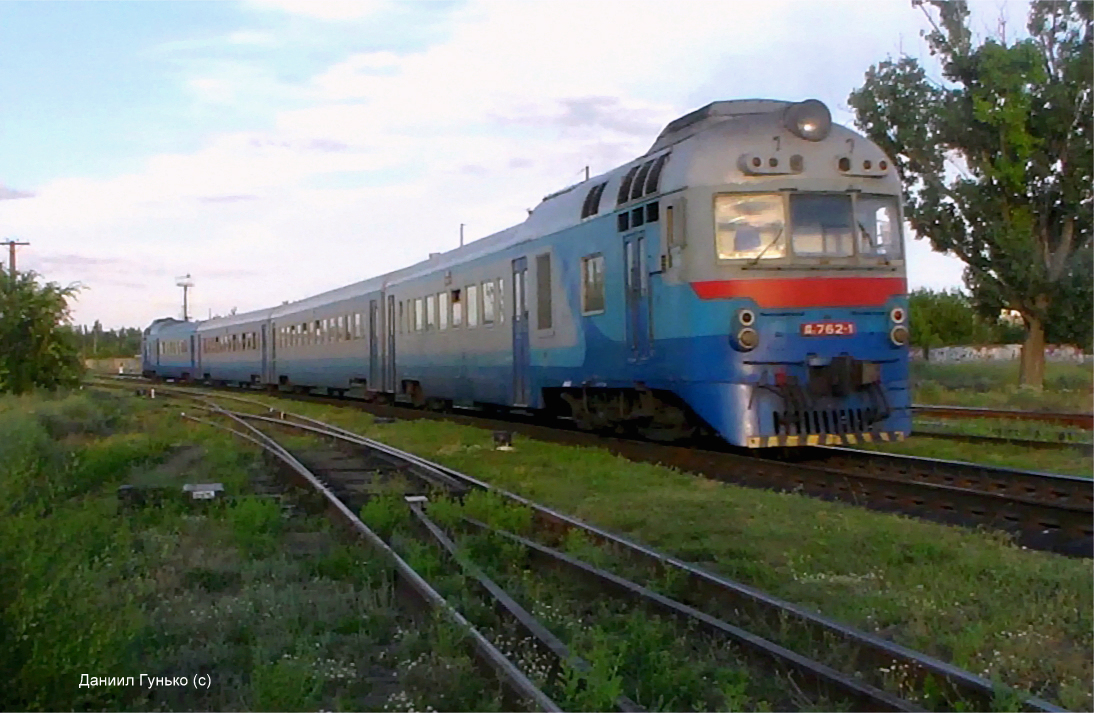

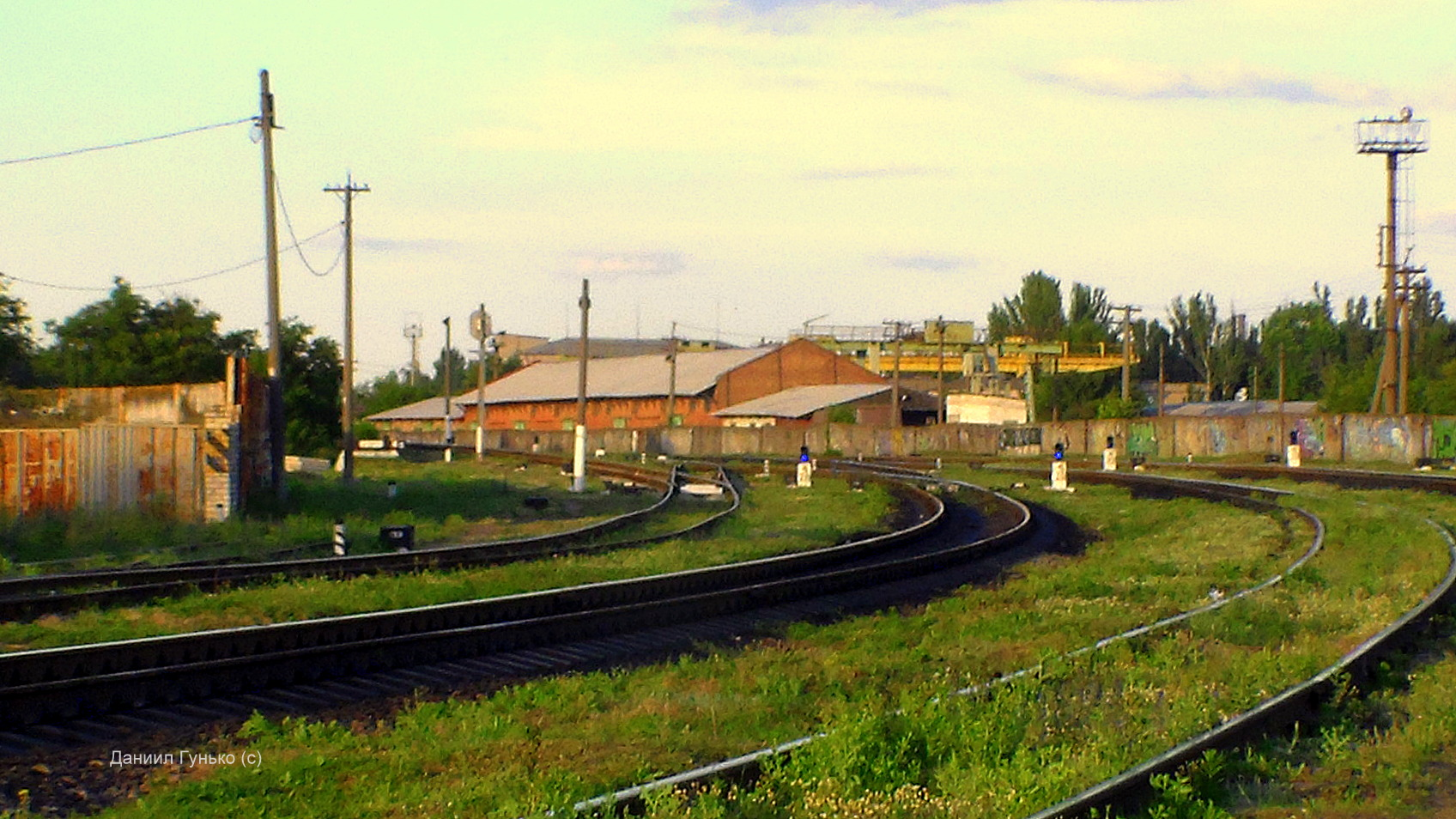

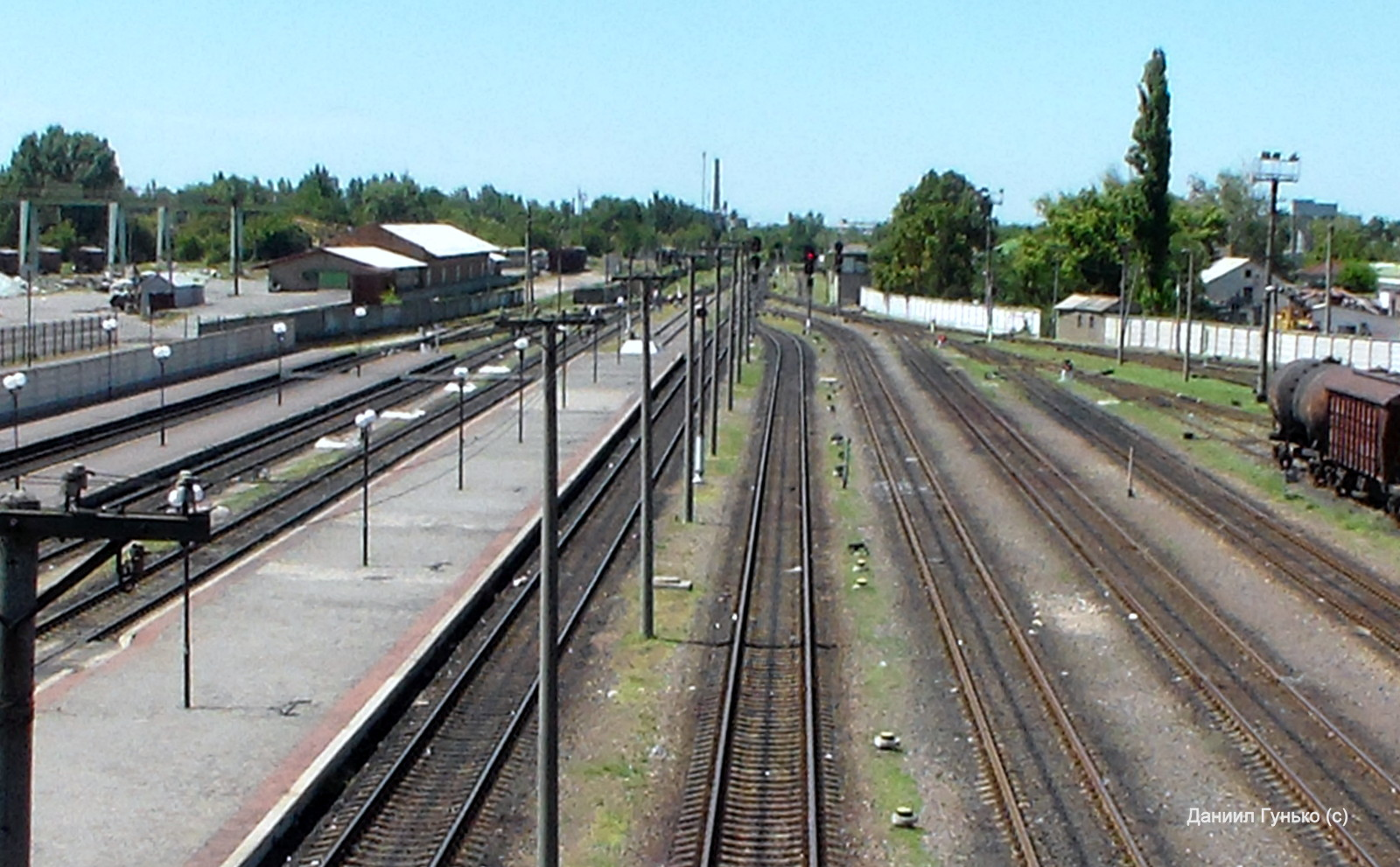

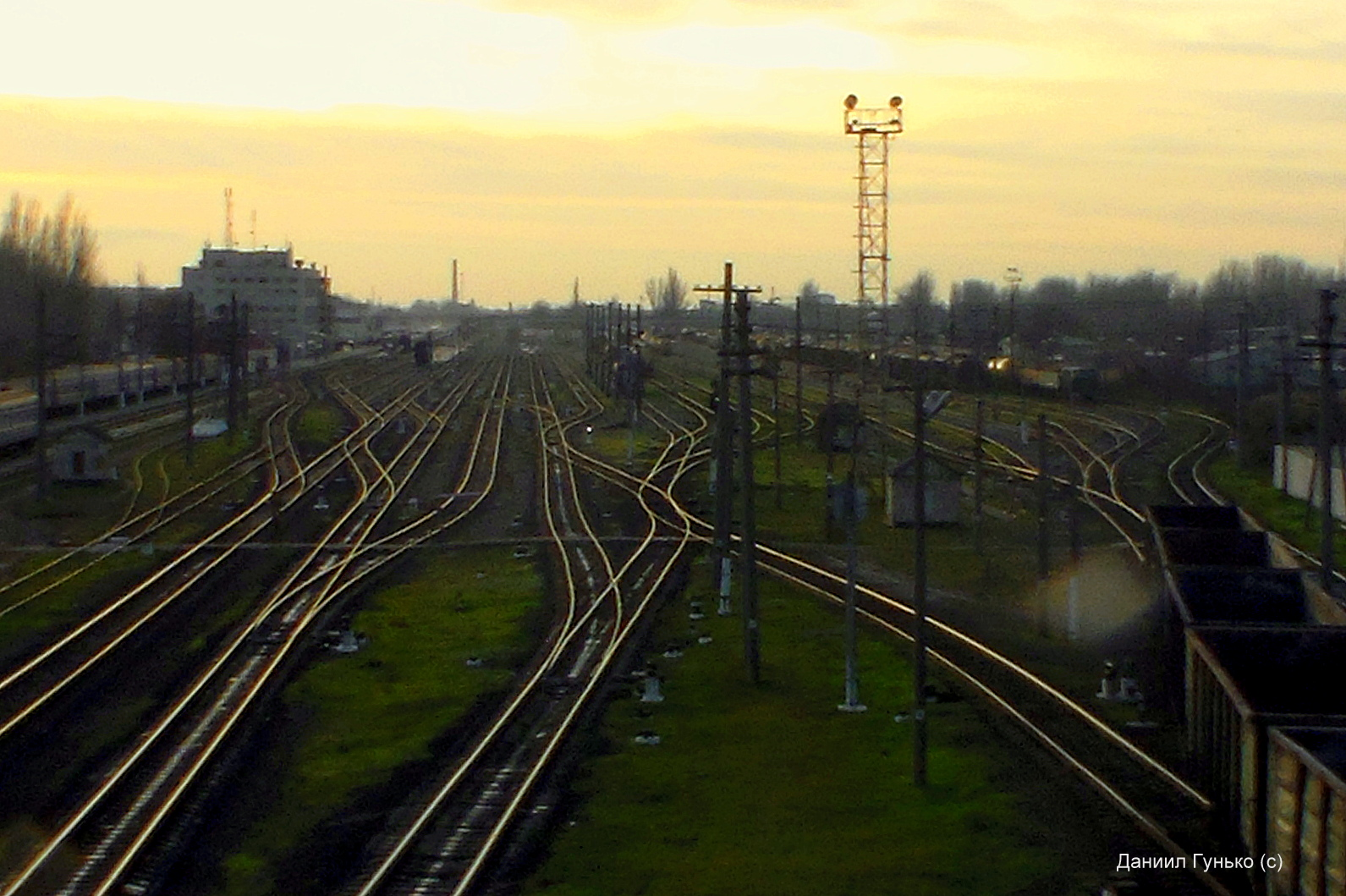

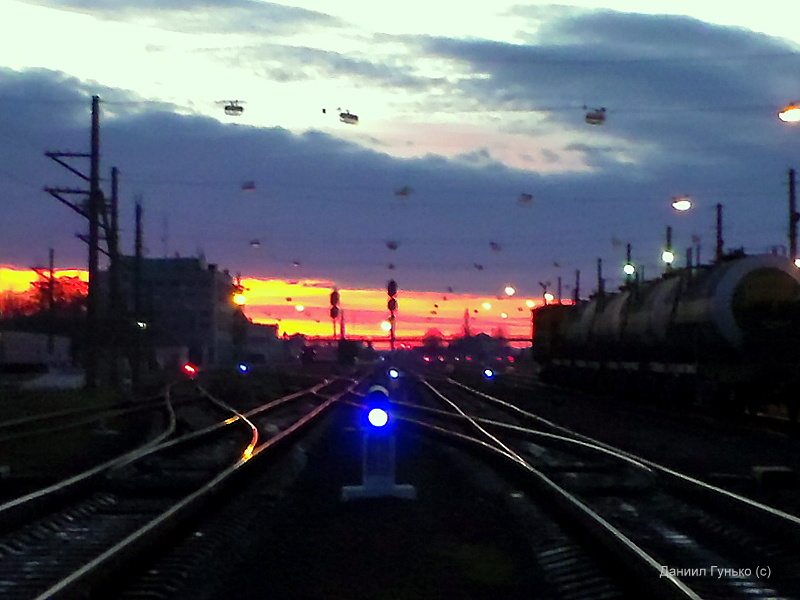
