= Mykolaiv railway station =

Railway station in Mykolaiv, Ukraine

Mykolaiv Миколаїв
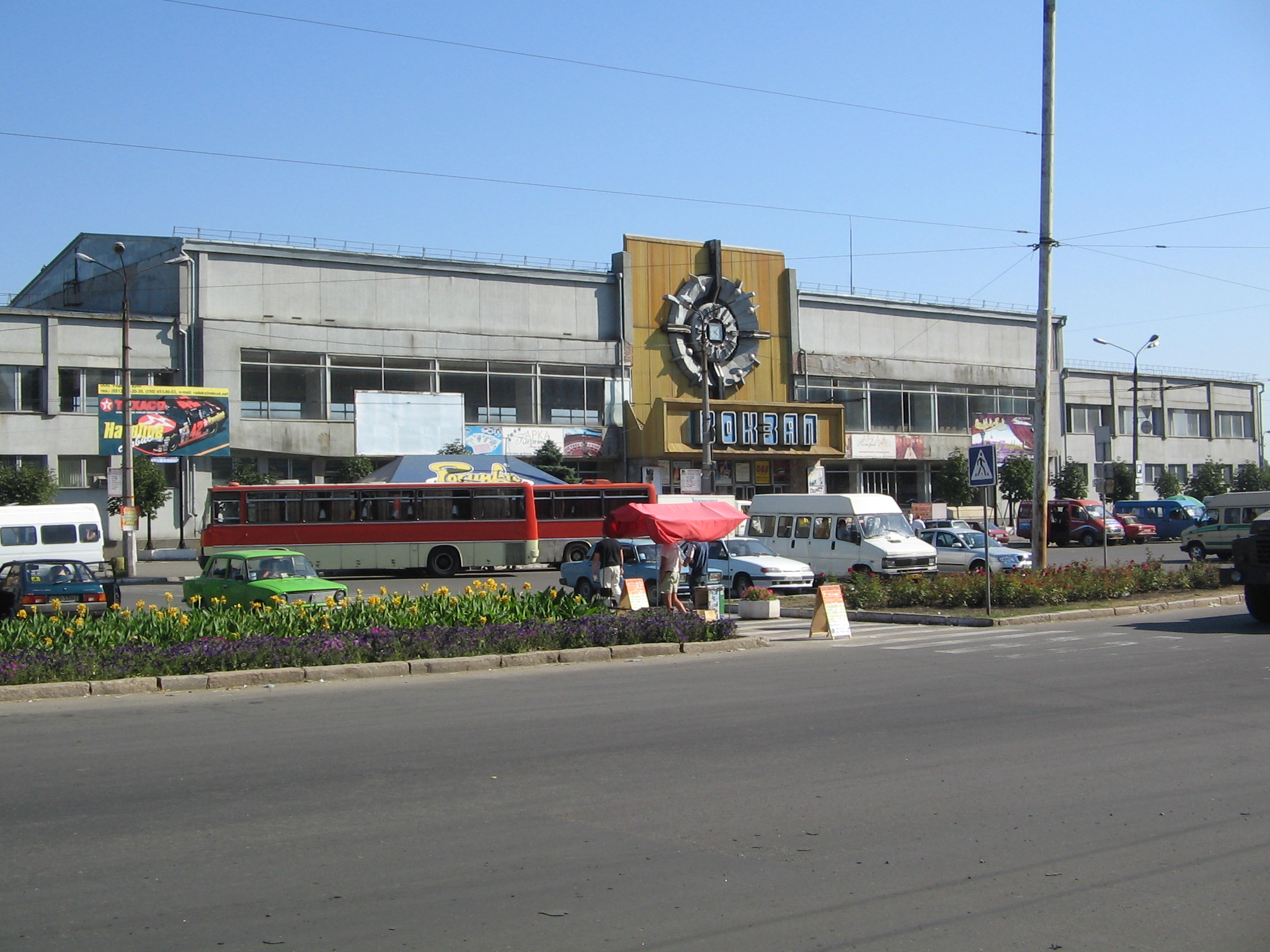
- Front view of the railway station

General information
- Location: Mykolaiv, Mykolaiv Raion; Mykolaiv Oblast, Ukraine
- Coordinates: 46°56′14″N 32°03′43″E
- System: Odesa Railways station
- Operator: Odesa Railways
- Distance: 585 kilometres (364 mi) from Kyiv-Pasazhyrskyi railway station
- Platforms: 3

Other information
- Station code: 415103

History
- Opened: 1908

Services
Preceding station	Ukrainian Railways	Following station
Depo toward Dolynska	Dolynska–Mykolaiv	Terminus
Depot toward Snihurivka	Snihurivka–Mykolaiv	Terminus
Meshkove toward Kolosivka	Kolosivka–Mykolaiv	Terminus
Terminus	Mykolaiv–Kherson	Kulbakin toward Kherson
Location

The Mykolaiv railway station (Ukrainian: Станція Миколаїв) is a railway station in the city of Mykolaiv. The station first opened in 1908, and is a part of Odesa Railways, within the -state-owned Ukrainian Railways. The station is a major passenger train station, and has direct services to most major cities throughout Ukraine, including Kyiv, Odesa, Kharkiv, Dnipro, and Lviv.

According to the "Investment Atlas of Ukraine", Mykolaiv's railway station receives an average of 1.2 million passengers every year.

== Name ==
The railway station was first opened in 1908, and was originally named Vodopyi (Ukrainian: Водопій). The name then changed to Mykolaiv-Sortuvanny in 1966 before renaming in 1987 to just Mykolaiv.

== Destinations ==
Many long-distance trains stop at Mykolaiv station. The largest destinations include: Kyiv, Odesa, Kharkiv, Dnipro, and Lviv, Zaporizhzhia, Kryvyi Rih, Kherson, and Ivano-Frankivsk.

During summer and winter holidays, additional trains to Kyiv and Lviv are scheduled to accommodate for holiday travel.

On July 5, 2016, a new railway track running between Kyiv and Kherson opened, which includes a stop in Mykolaiv. The travel time between Kyiv and Mykolaiv is estimated to be about 6 hours.

On November 14, 2022, the first train left Mykolaiv station since the Russian invasion of Ukraine, and headed for its destination of Kyiv.

There are also trains that serve secondary cities, such as to Mykolaiv (Lviv Oblast), Dolynska, Kakhovka, Tokarivka, and Apostolove.
