= Transnistrian Railway =

Railway in Moldova

Transnistrian Railway Приднестровская железная дорога

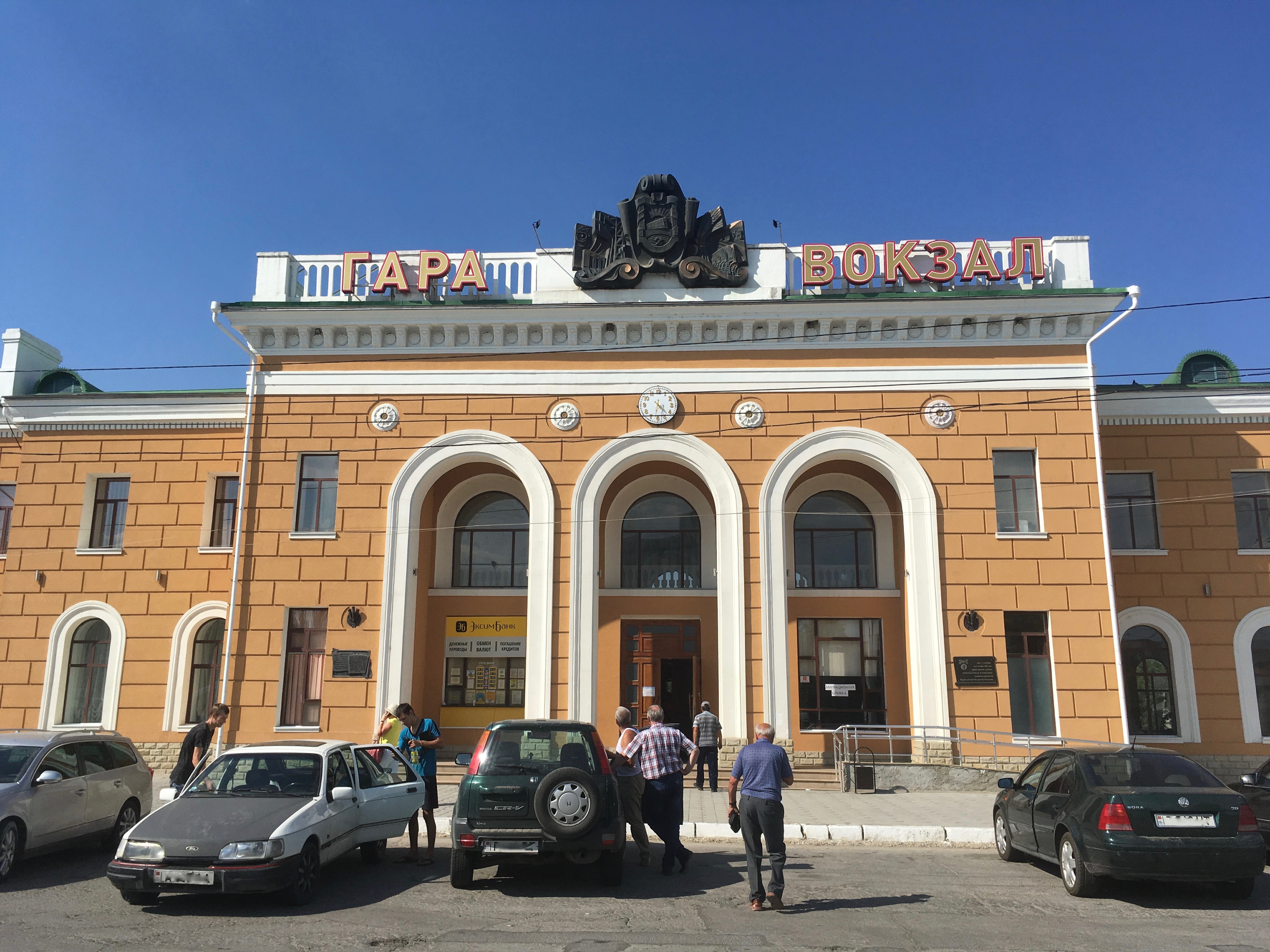
- The Tiraspol railway station, the largest in Transnistria

Overview
- Headquarters: Tiraspol
- Locale: Transnistria, Moldova
- Dates of operation: 2004–
- Predecessor: Moldovan Railways

Technical
- Track gauge: 1,520 mm (4 ft 11 27/32 in)

Other
- Website: pjdpmr.com

Transnistrian Railway (Russian: Приднестровская железная дорога, romanized: Pridnestrovskaya zheleznaya doroga) is the railway operator of Transnistria.

== History ==
The first railway line on the territory of Transnistria was built in 1867, from Kuchurhan station to Tiraspol, and in 1871 to Chișinău.

In early November 1877, the Bender–Galați line, with a length of 305 km (190 mi), was opened for military traffic.

In August 1894, the section from Rîbnița to Bălți with a bridge across the Dniester and a 165-meter tunnel on the Lipceni–Mateuți stretch was put into operation.

In June 1917, the Bender locomotive depot had 253 locomotives and was the largest on the South-Western railway.

In World War II, the railroad provided access to the front line and the entire combat area for the Soviet war effort. Using the railway, industrial facilities were evacuated and troops and ammunition were brought to the front line. Track gauge on the main lines was changed three times: in July 1940 to 1,524 mm (5 ft 0 in), in August 1941 to 1,435 mm (4 ft 8.5 in), between May and the end of 1944 back to 1,524 mm (5 ft 0 in). During the war, over 20% of the network, 30 stations, 50% of the buildings, major bridges on the Dniester and Prut rivers, 90% of the machinery, 30% of the communication lines and more were destroyed and 100 km (62 mi) of tracks were dismantled and removed.

From 1939 to 1997, the narrow-gauge Camenca–Popelyukhi railway operated. In 1999, it was dismantled.

In the 1946–50 period, 3 billion rubles from the Union budget were spent on the restoration and modernization of the Moldavian railway. More than 600 structures were built, more than 1 million m³ of earthworks were performed, 1.7 million m³ of construction materials were used, over 650 thousand sleepers were laid, the operational length reached 1,020 km (630 mi) and in 1948 the Union-level train speed was reached.

From 1953 to 1979 the Moldavian railway was merged with the Odesa Railways and was called the Odesa–Chișinău railroad.

In 1991, electrification of the Razdelnaya (Ukraine)–Kuchurhan (Ukraine)–Tiraspol–Bender section began, but was interrupted due to the Transnistrian War. Currently, only the Ukrainian part of the contact network (up to Kuchurhan) is working. However, in Tiraspol there are unwired supports.

In August 2004, due to the aggravation of relations between Moldova and Transnistria, the unitary enterprise "Transnistrian Railway" (centered around Tiraspol, Bender and Rîbnița stations) was created, separating the network from the Moldovan Railways.

== Gallery ==
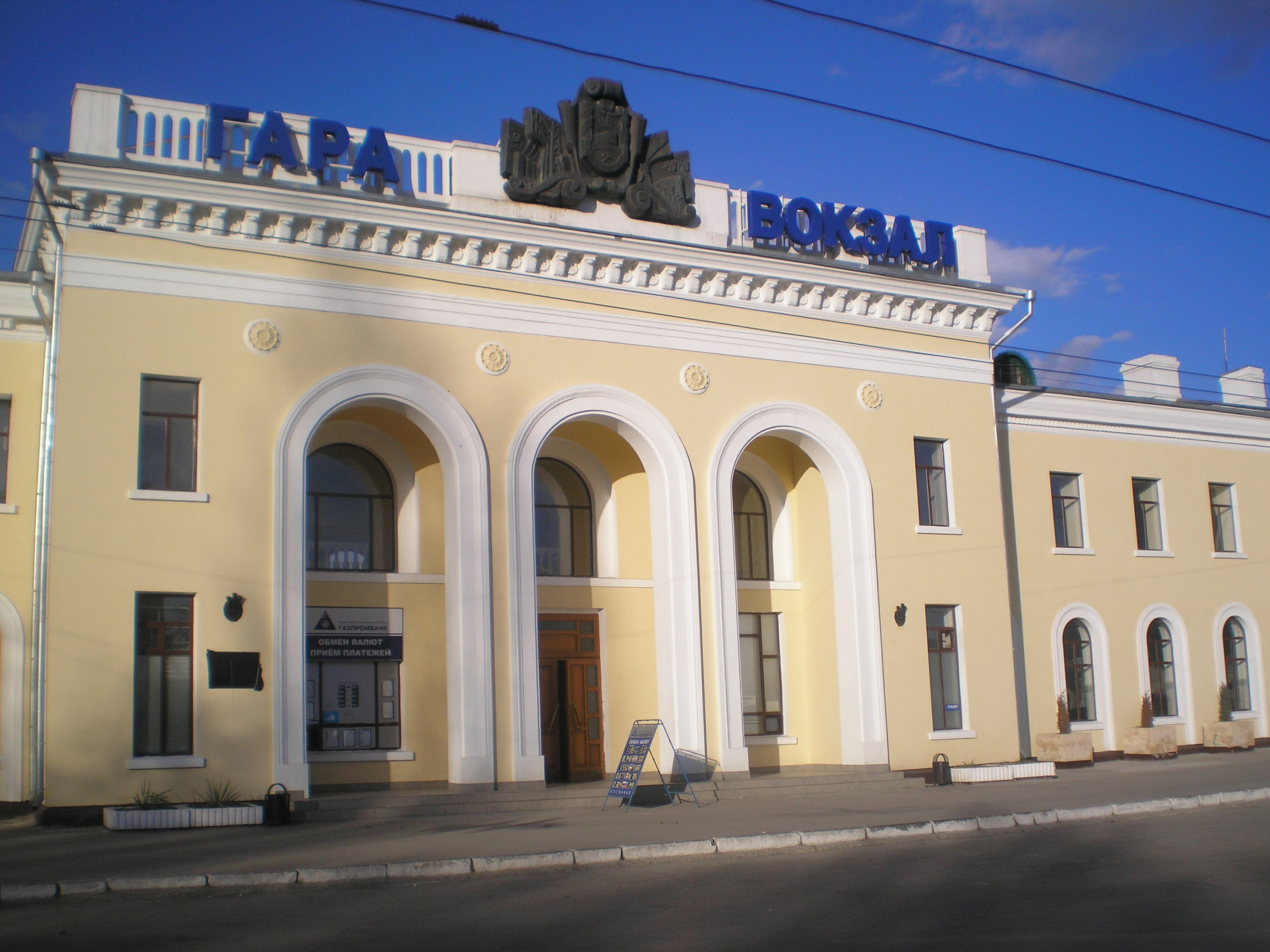
Tiraspol Railway station

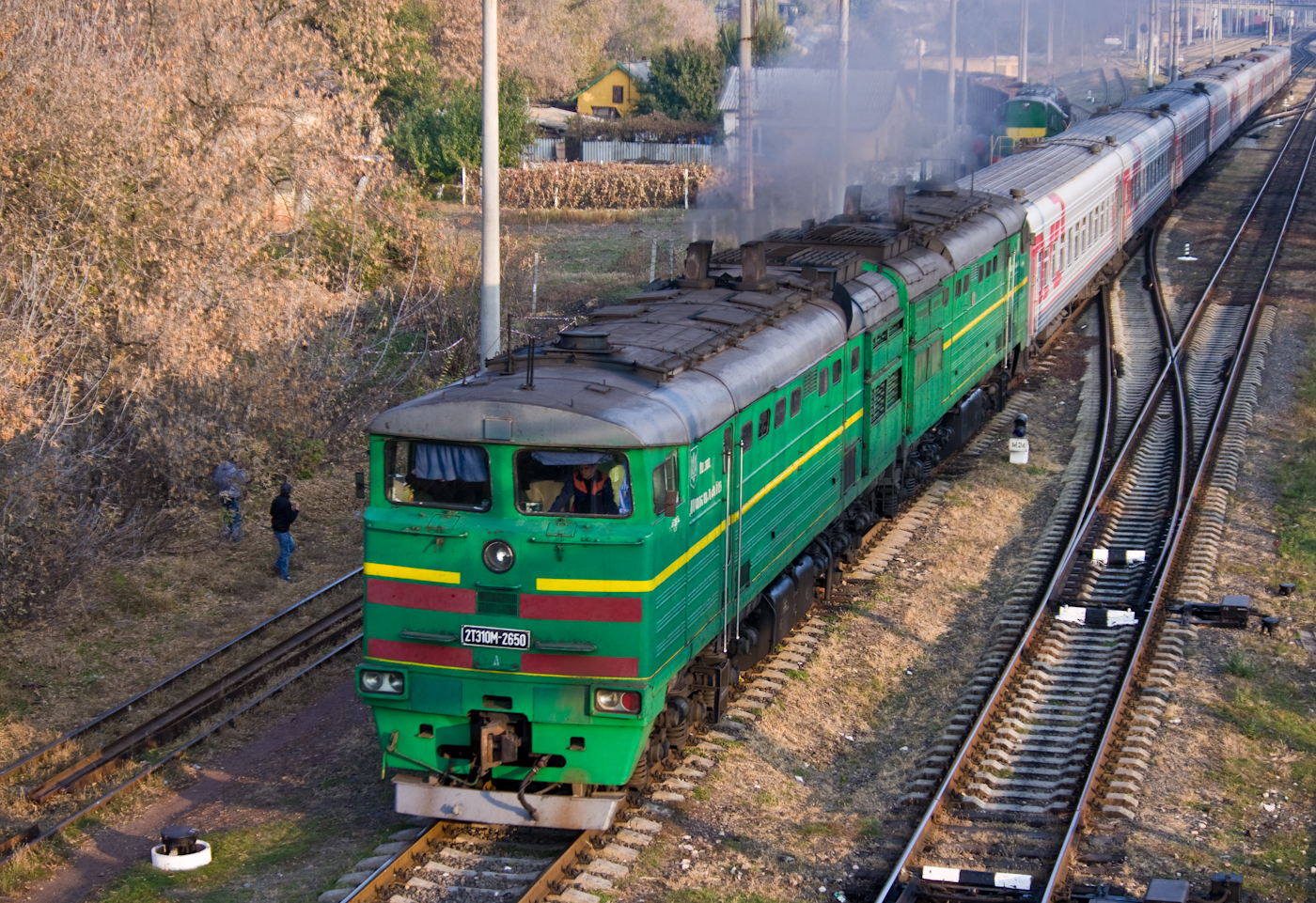
Moscow–Chișinău Train

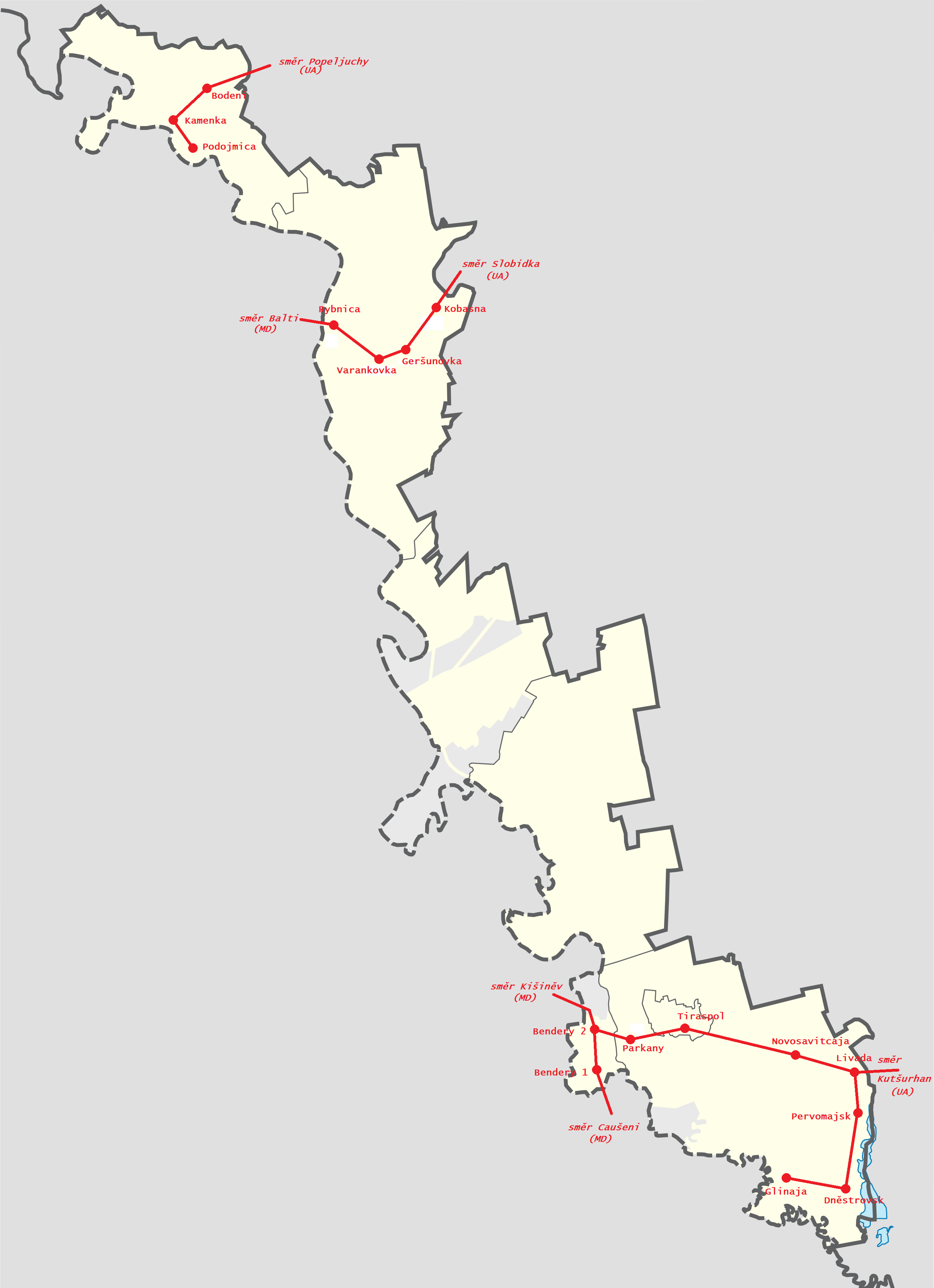
Map

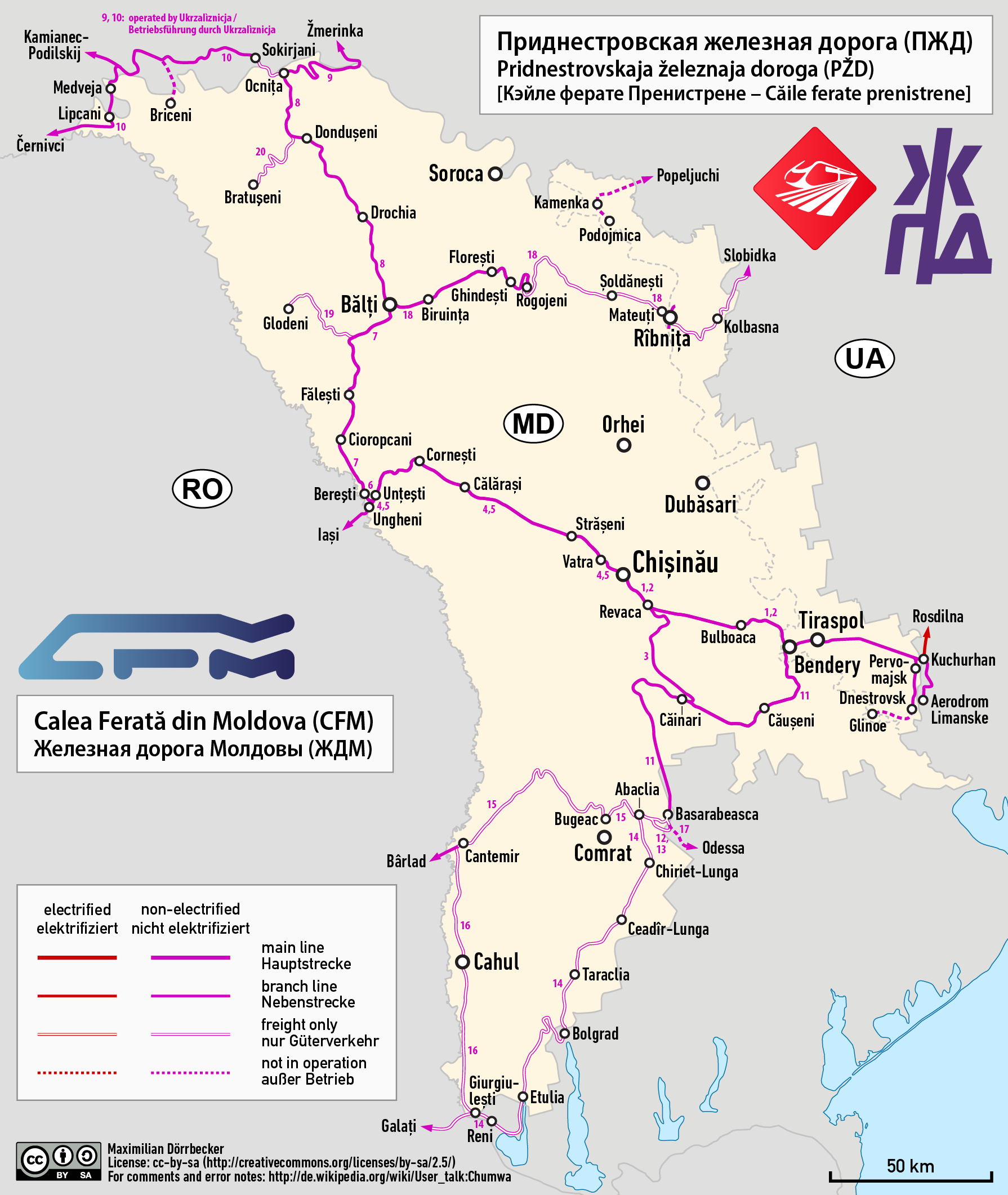
Map

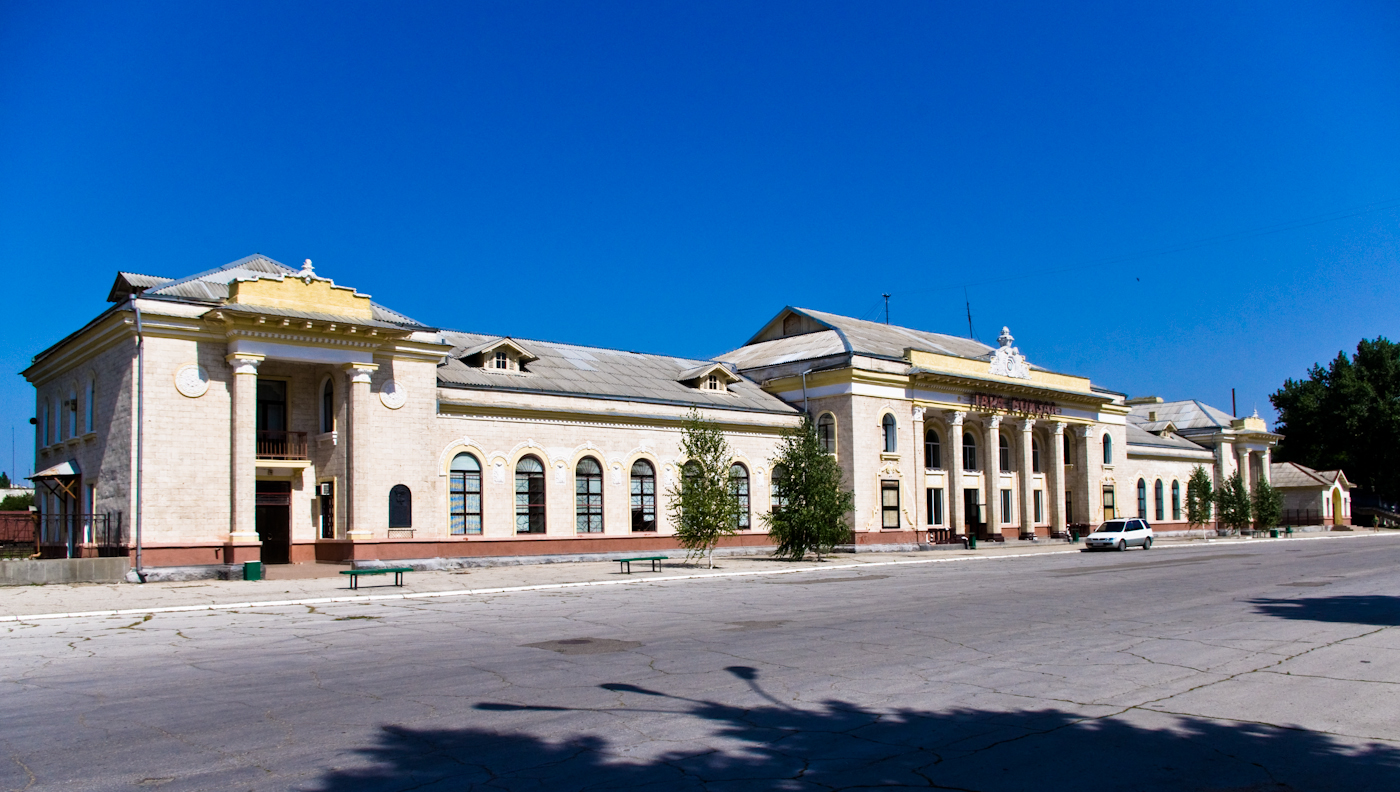
Bender-1

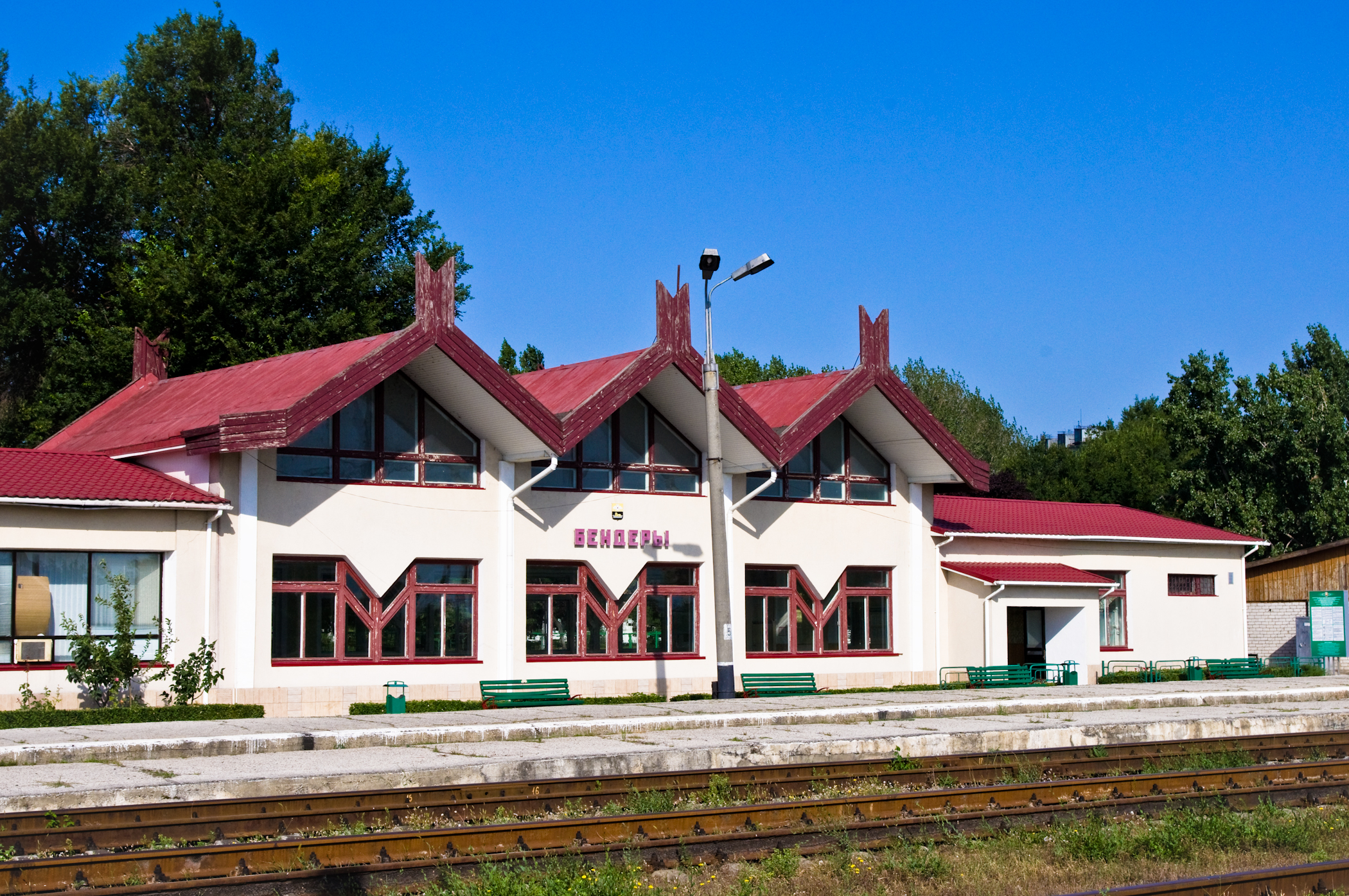
Bender-2
