= Tokarivka, Voznesensk Raion, Mykolaiv Oblast =

Rural locality in Mykolaiv Oblast, Ukraine

Tokarivka Токарівка
- Rural settlement
- Location within Ukraine Location within Mykolaiv Oblast
- Coordinates: 47°18′11″N 31°0′45″E
- Country: Ukraine
- Oblast: Mykolaiv Oblast
- Raion: Voznesensk Raion

Population (2022)
  - Total: 1,989
- Time zone: UTC+2 (EET)
  - Summer (DST): UTC+3 (EEST)

Tokarivka (Ukrainian: Токарівка, Russian: Токаревка, romanized: Tokarevka) is a rural settlement in Voznesensk Raion, Mykolaiv Oblast, Ukraine. It belongs to Veselynove settlement hromada, one of the hromadas of Ukraine. The population was 1,989 (2022 estimate).

== History ==
Tokarivka was founded as Kolosivka, since originally it was the estate of Princess Kolosova. In 1920, it was renamed Kudriavtsivka to commemorate certain bolshevik Kudriavtsev who was responsible for the local land redistribution after the 1917 October Revolution. In 1976, Kudriavtsivka was granted urban-type settlement status.

On 19 May 2016, Verkhovna Rada adopted decision to rename Kudriavtsivka to Tokarivka and conform to the law prohibiting names of Communist origin. Tokarivka was named in honor of Vitaliy Tokar, who died near Marinka during his service in the Anti-Terrorist Operation Zone in eastern Ukraine.

Until 18 July 2020, Tokarivka belonged to Veselynove Raion. In July 2020, as part of the administrative reform of Ukraine, which reduced the number of raions of Mykolaiv Oblast to four, Veselynove Raion was merged into Voznesensk Raion. On 26 January 2024, a new law entered into force which abolished the status of urban-type settlement status, and Tokarivka became a rural settlement.

== Economy ==
=== Transportation ===
Kolosivka railway station, located in Tokarivka, is a junction of three lines, which connect it to Mykolaiv, Pomichna (via Voznesensk), and Odesa.

Preceding station	Ukrainian Railways	Following station
I.S. Shevernyaev toward Odesa-Holovna	Odesa–Kolosivka	Terminus
Terminus	Kolosivka–Pomichna	Mykolaieve toward Pomichna
Terminus	Kolosivka–Mykolaiv	Mishkove toward Mykolaiv
