= Tiraspol railway station =

Railway station in Moldova

Coordinates: 46.8476°N 29.6294°E

Tiraspol
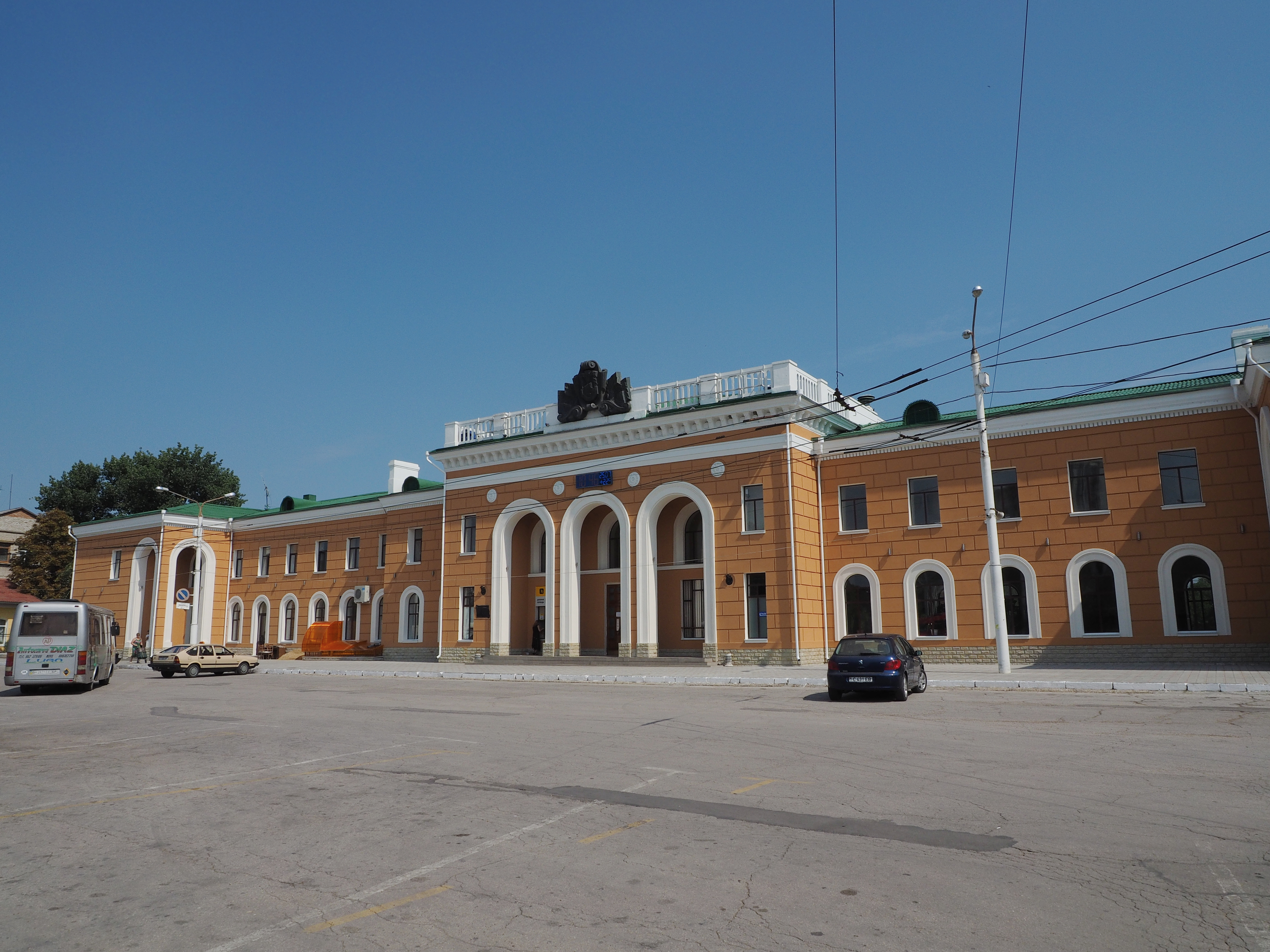
- View of the station from Privokzalnaya Square.

General information
- Location: Transnistria, Tiraspol
- System: Transnistrian Railway station
- Owner: Transnistrian Railway
- Platforms: 2
- Tracks: 12

Construction
- Parking: Yes

Other information
- Station code: 45100

History
- Opened: 1867; 159 years ago

Services
Preceding station	Transnistrian Railway	Following station
Location

Tiraspol railway station is a railway station in the city of Tiraspol, capital of the de facto state of Transnistria, recognised internationally as part of Moldova. It has both passenger and freight facilities, including a capacity for border control by the Transnistrian authorities.

It operated as part of the rail network of the Moldavian Soviet Socialist Republic, which became the Republic of Moldova in 1991 on the collapse of the Soviet Union. Following the local conflict of the following year, there is an unresolved political situation in the region. As a result, ownership of the railway station is claimed by the Republic of Moldova, whose trains operate through the station, whilst the unrecognised Transnistrian government also claims ownership and actually operates the station facilities.

== History ==
In 1846 a Belgian engineer named Zuber began developing the initial draft of the railway between Odesa and Tiraspol. The construction of the railway to Tiraspol began in the second half of the 1860s. In 1867 the railway line was opened from Rozdilna to Tiraspol, and by the end of 1867 Tiraspol railway station had been completed.

At the beginning of the 20th century passenger traffic occupied an increasingly important position in rail transport in the region. The line between Odesa and Chișinău via Tiraspol operated passenger and freight trains, including the carriage of mail.

In April 1944 the station was burned down by the German-Romanian troops.

Until 1992 more than 30 trains passed through the station daily. Subsequently the service has declined, with around two or three passengers trains on a current typical working day.

In 2014 there was a restoration of the station building by the railway authority, with considerable structural and cosmetic work to the facade and the interior, and the installation of a new station clock. There are further plans to develop and enhance the large square outside the station, including the installation of a fountain, and development of the interchange facilities with local Trolleybuses and taxis.

== Trains ==
There are currently no passenger trains which routinely call at Tiraspol station. Previously, there were international trains

- Moscow – Chișinău (terminated in 2020 because of COVID-19 pandemic)
- Saratov – Varna (terminated in 2020 because of COVID-19 pandemic)
- Odesa – Chișinău (terminated in 2022 after Russian invasion of Ukraine)

== Gallery ==
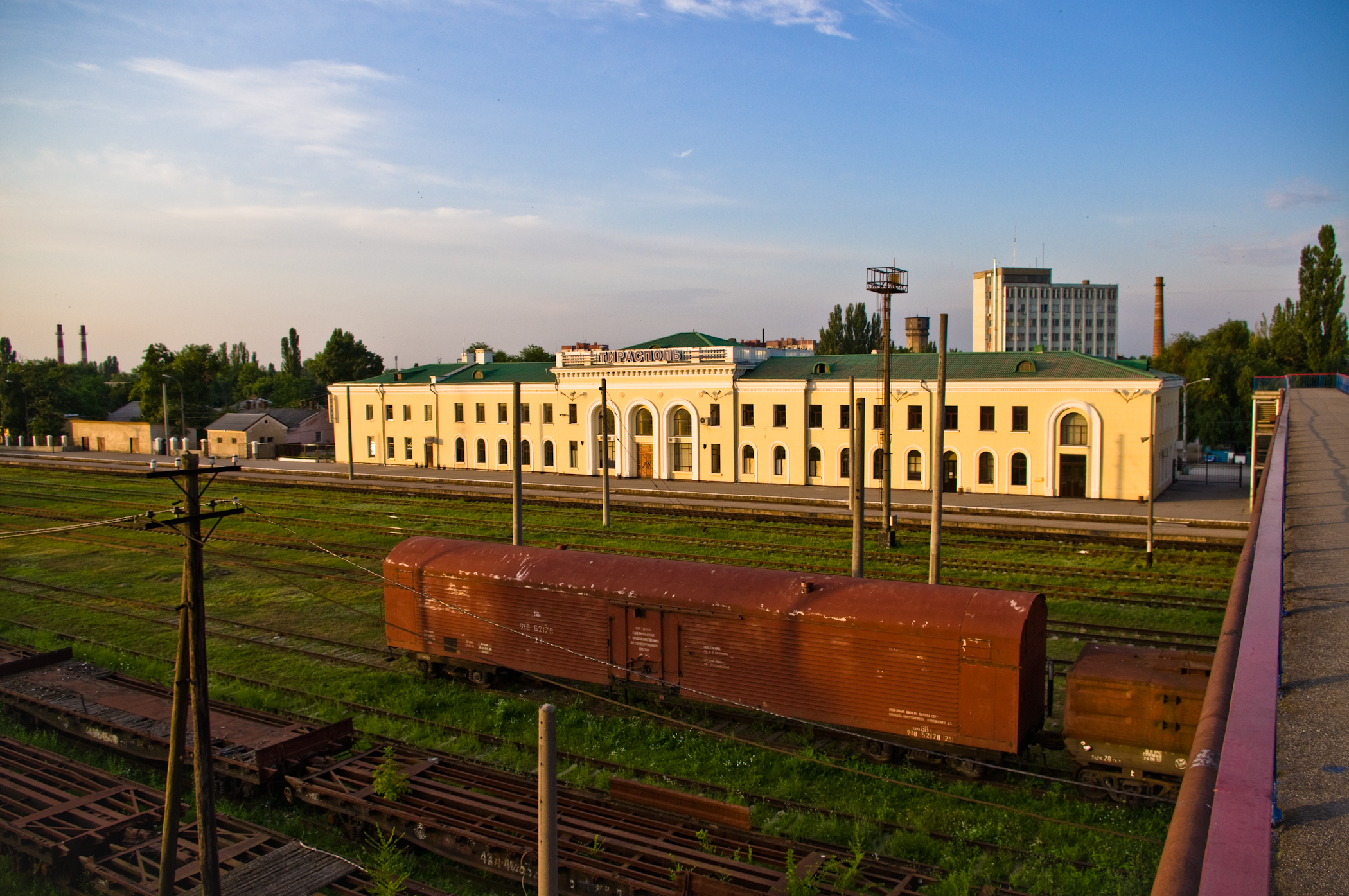
The station building from the public footbridge.

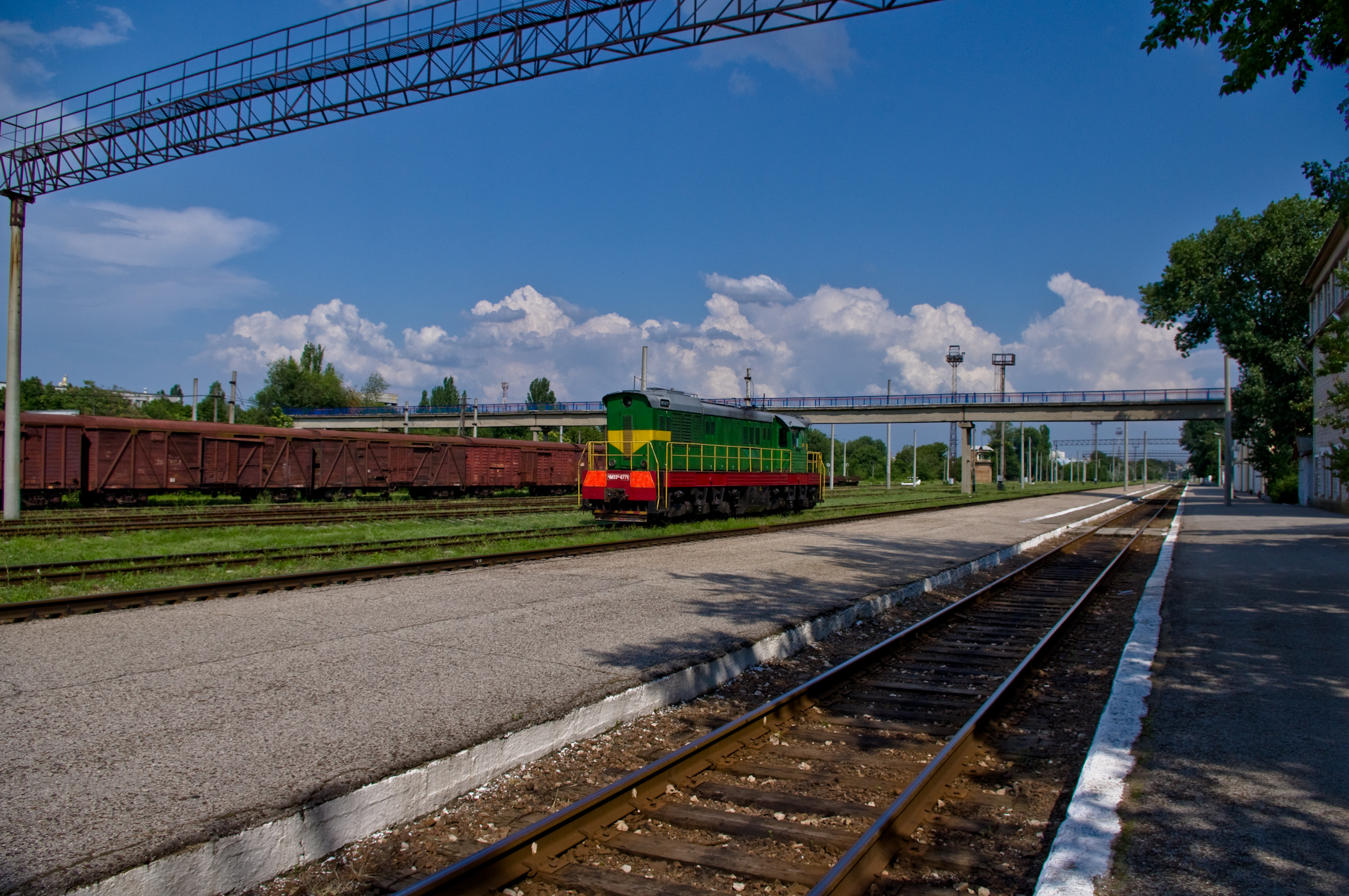
The platforms, with a ChME3 locomotive in the freight sidings.

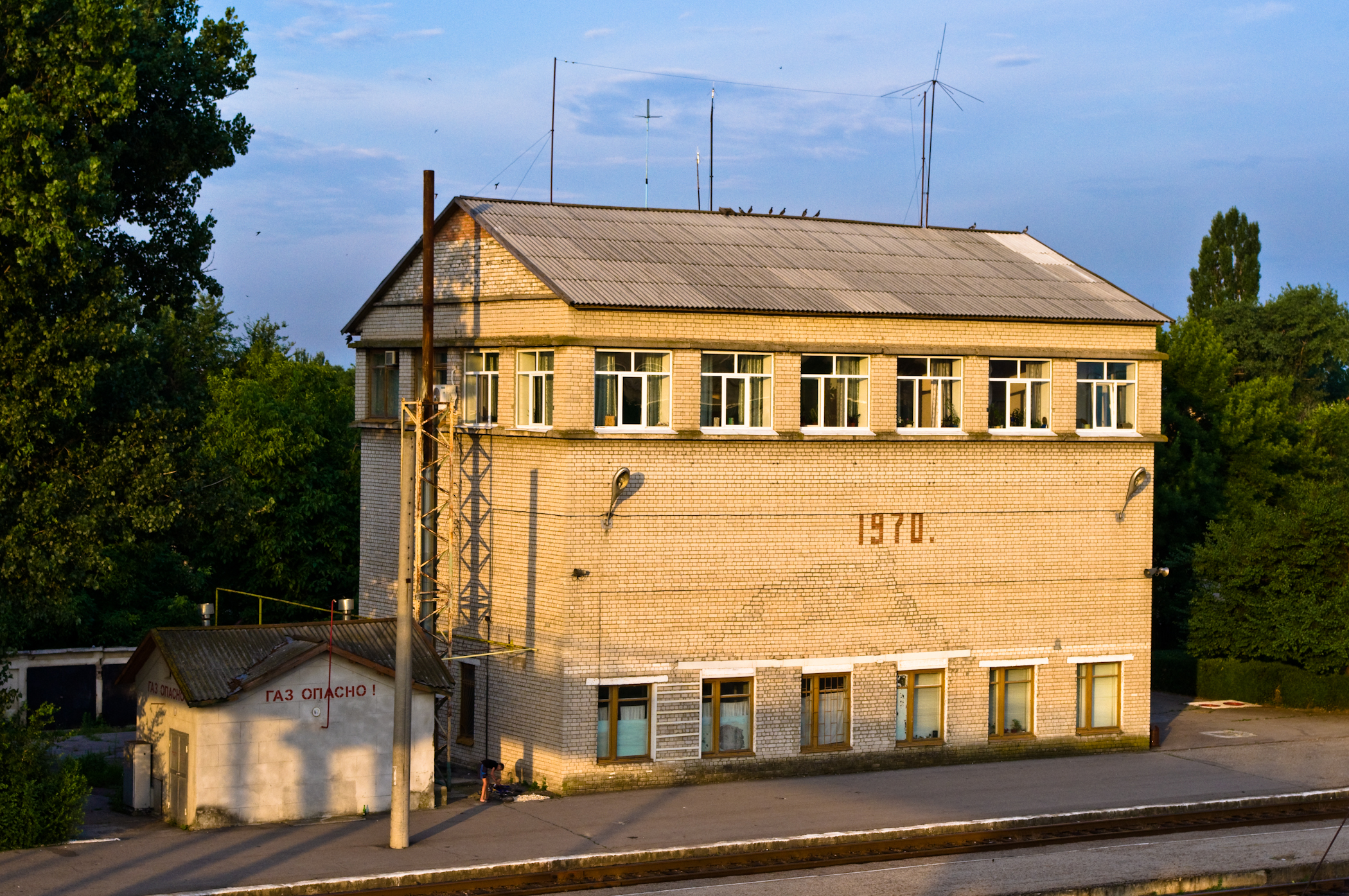
An operational building on the station site.

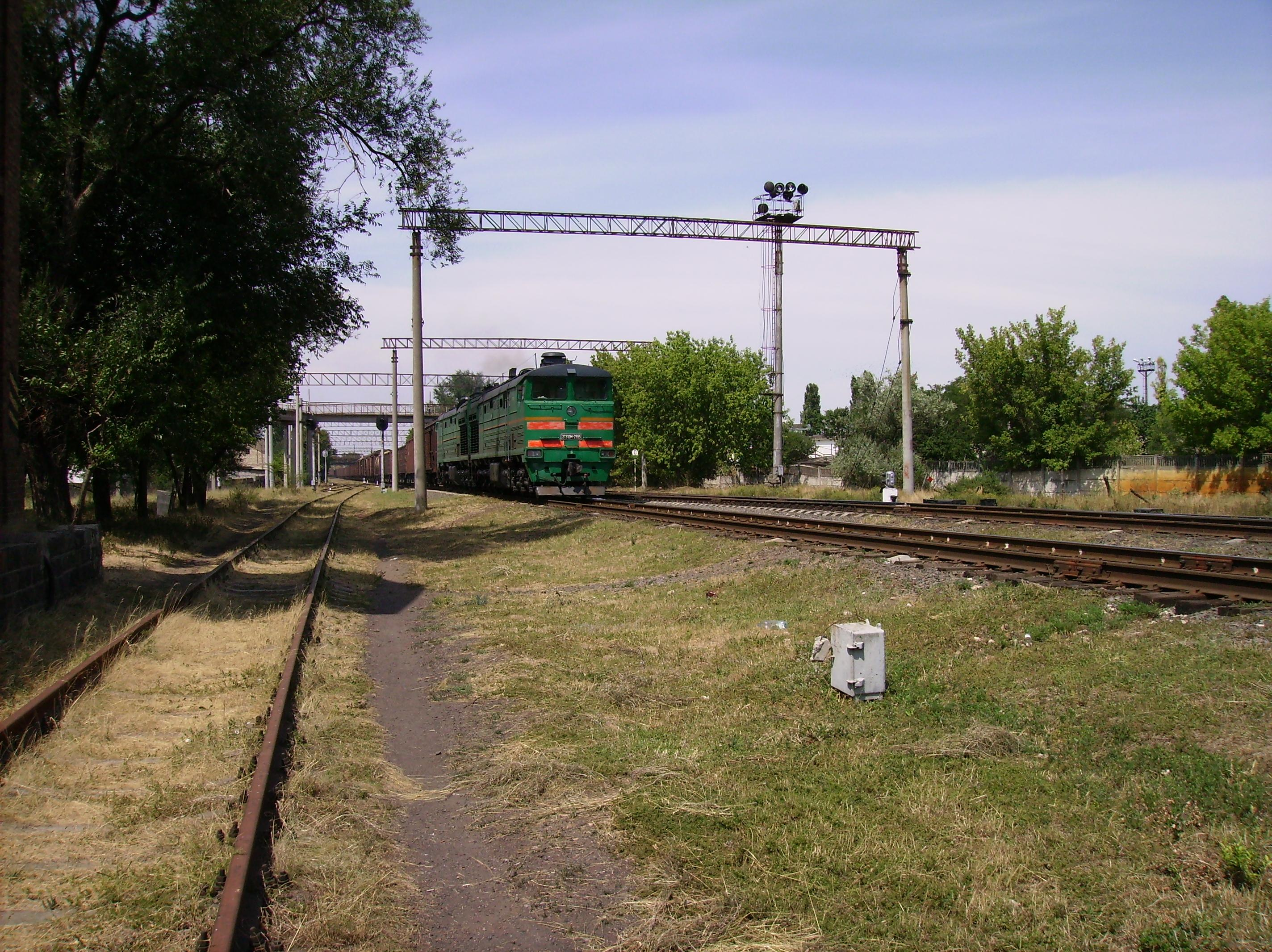
A freight train near Tiraspol, hauled by a soviet TE10 locomotive.

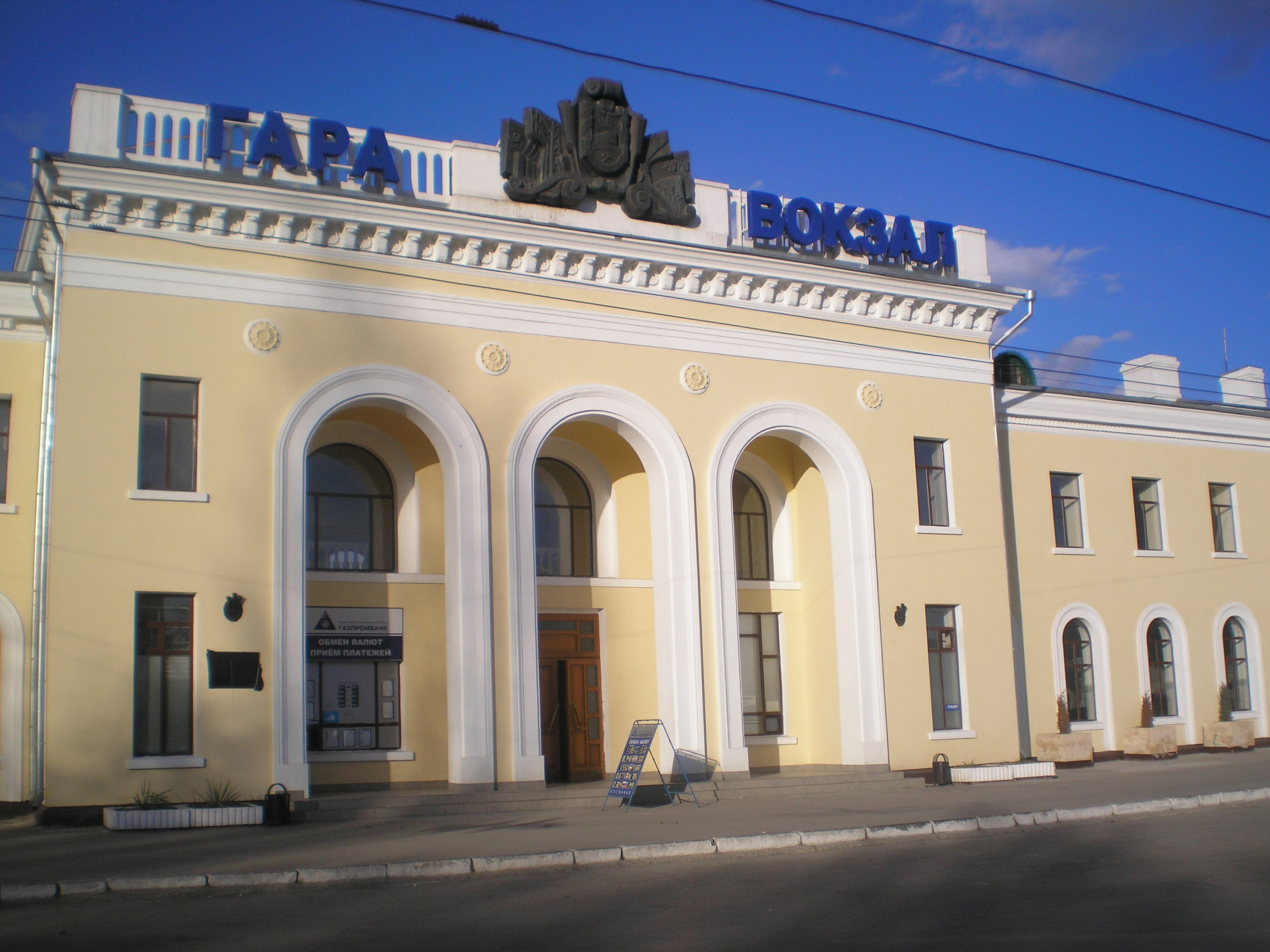
Main station entrance.

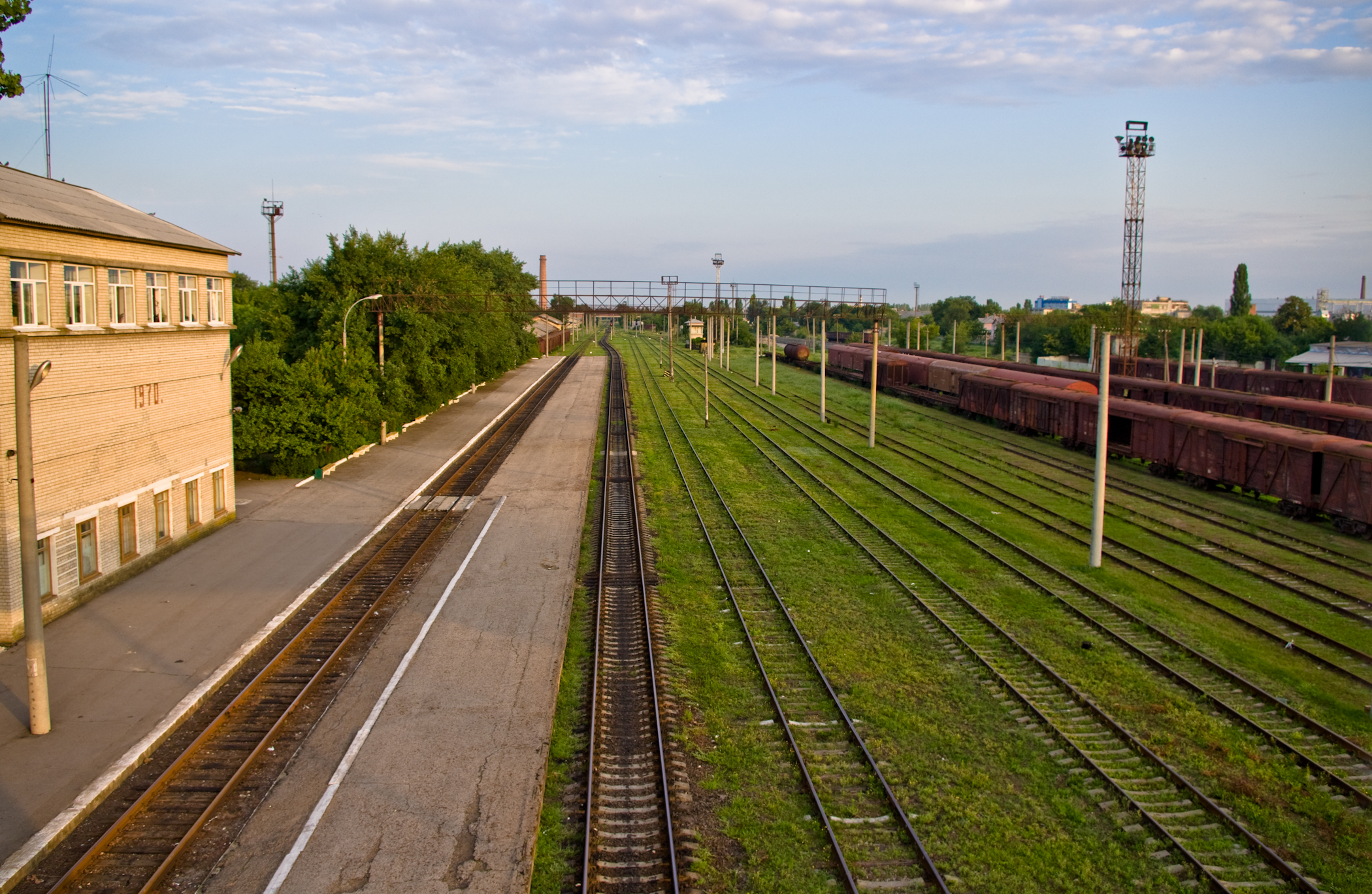
A view of the platforms and freight sidings.
