= Odesa Railways =

State-owned railway company in Ukraine

Odesa Railways Одеська залізниця

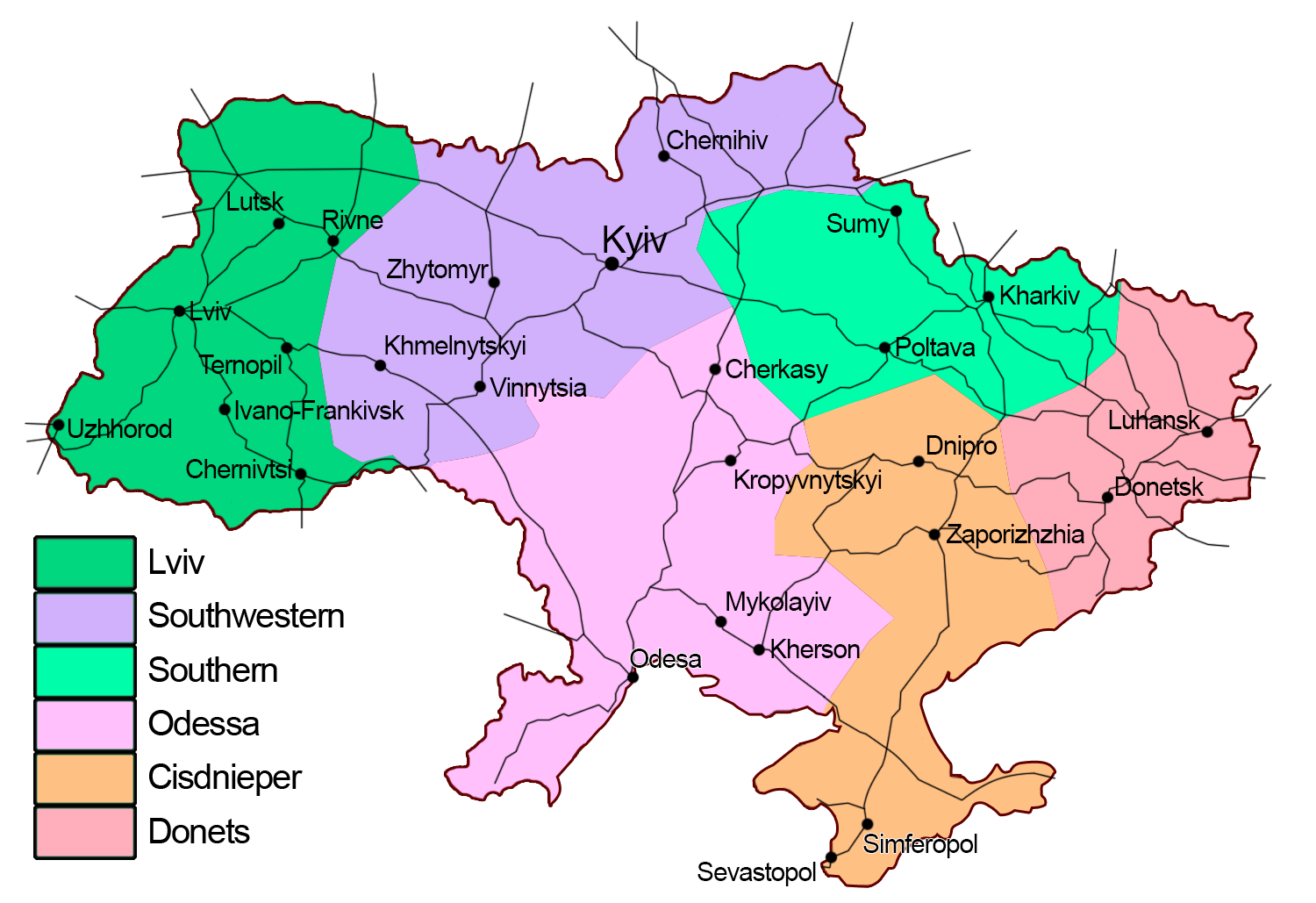
- Subdivisions of Ukrainian Railways

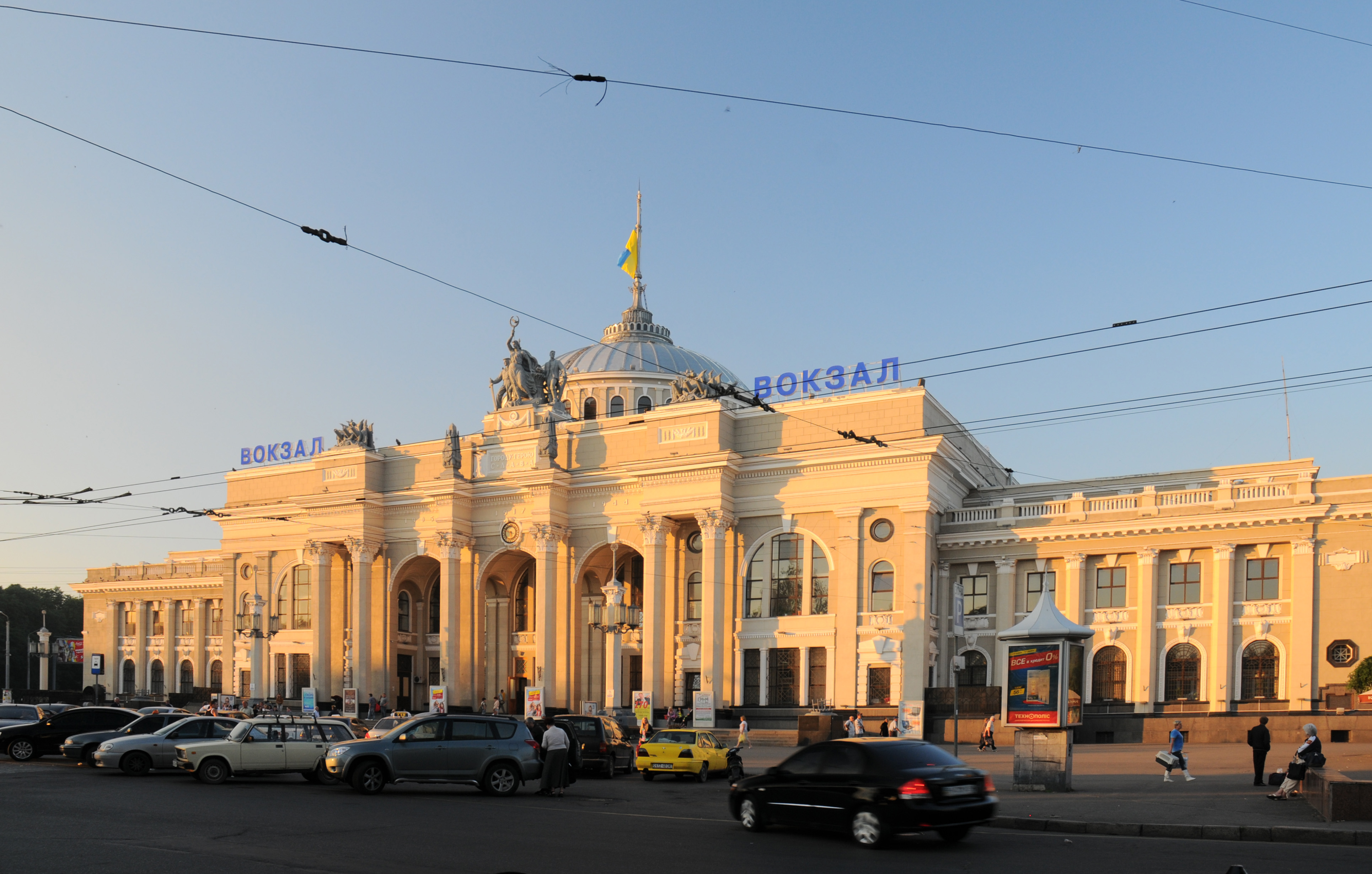
- Odesa railway station, the biggest on Odesa Railways

Overview
- Headquarters: Odesa
- Locale: Ukraine (Southern Ukraine)
- Dates of operation: 1865–present

Technical
- Track gauge: 1,520 mm (4 ft 11 27/32 in)

Other
- Website: odz.gov.ua

Odesa Railways is a rail operator in Ukraine. It is a territorial branch company of Ukrainian Railways.

== Main information ==
It lies on the territory of six Oblasts of Ukraine: Odesa, Mykolaiv, Kherson, Cherkasy, Kirovohrad and Vinnytsia.

Odesa railways account for about 20% of freight and more than 16% of passenger traffic of Railways of Ukraine. In the region of Odesa Railways there are large sea and river ports, which ensure high traffic load.

== History ==
=== Russian Empire to the Soviet Union ===
The first section of the Odesa railways (length 222,52 miles) from Odesa to Balta with a branch from Rozdilna to Kuchurhan and with a branch to the quarantine wharf entered into force on 3 December 1865. For the next 13 years, the Odesa railways existed as an independent mechanism, and then became part of the joint stock company Southwestern Railways. First Odesa railway station was near the Alexis area. Sergei Witte and Odesa entrepreneurs have shown interest in the organization of freight traffic between major enterprises of the city, also put forward the idea of building branches in important to the city's defense of the military unit. Was built by the Slobodka-Romanovka branch in the port of Odesa, and later in the most important industrial area of the city — Peresyp, which further marked the beginning of kolosovskogo direction. With the growth of passenger traffic, it was decided to build trains, local traffic Rozdilna railway station, and using existing wrap station only long-distance trains. Dead-end station was built in 1884 in the region of the Italian Boulevard and the adjacent part of which was rebuilt in station square, and was named "Small station", and the existing one was called "the Big station". Also the route was built to service the military units located on the coast between the Middle Fountain and Lustgarten, later demolished in the 1930s. Constructed branch pomichna — podgorodnoe to pair with a vast hive of narrow gauge Railways of Vinnytsia. Then begins the construction of a branch line to service the Balts. Due to the difficult terrain the railroad was constructed a few kilometers South of the city, and around the station Balta rose village belino. Building a direct road connection between the city and the station required a large volume of earthworks. It was conducted a few years and for Oceania investment travel on the road for several more years after construction was paid.

=== Independent Ukraine ===
In 1992, Odesa railway became part of the national company Ukrzaliznytsia. Further electrified the plot Kotovsk — Rozdilna, allowing you to increase the circulation of the electric rolling stock and reorganize the traffic on DWS. Also electrified branch line Odesa-Peresyp — Odesa-Port. Commissioned plots pomichna — Podilsk — Lobed, Vapniarka — Podilsk — Lobed, Kuchurhan — Rozdilna, pour — Odesa-Port. The length of electrified lines becomes 1708 km (which is 39.9% of the total length of the railway). Stops passenger traffic on the branch Baraboi — Ovidiopol. After the completion of the electrification of the Odesa site begins mass write locomotives M62.
