= Russian State University of Physical Education, Sport, Youth and Tourism =

University in Moscow, Russia

Russian State University of Physical Education, Sport, Youth and Tourism (SCOLIPE)
- Российский государственный университет физической культуры, спорта, молодёжи и туризма (ГЦОЛИФК)
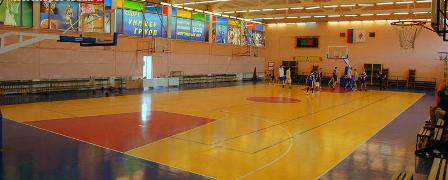
- Established: 1918
- Rector: Professor Tamara Victorovna Mikhaylova
- Location: Moscow, Russia; 55.8016°N 37.7627°E
- Website: www.sportedu.ru/en

Russian State University of Physical Education, Sport, Youth and Tourism (SCOLIPE) (Russian: Российский государственный университет физической культуры, спорта, молодёжи и туризма (ГЦОЛИФК)) is a university in Moscow, founded in 1918.

== History ==
The idea of creating an educational institution came from the wife of Vladimir Bonch-Bruyevich, Vera Velichkina (1868-1918), who after the October Revolution, from December 20, 1917, organized and headed the school-sanitary department of the People's Commissariat of Education [3]. Her proposal was supported by the first People's Commissar of Education, Anatoly Lunacharsky. He recommended locating the institute in the palace of Count Razumovsky on Gorokhovskaya Street (now Kazakova Street), expropriated by the Soviet government.

On May 29, 1918, the Moscow Institute of Physical Culture was opened. In June 1918, six-month courses for training physical culture instructors opened. On August 24, 1918, an announcement was published in the Izvestia newspaper about the first recruitment of students to the one-year Institute of Physical Culture. The admissions committee of the institute received 317 applications, including 117 from men and 200 from women. 32 people were admitted to the first year, mainly teachers and doctors from various provinces. The first classes at the institute began on October 1, 1918.

By the summer of 1918, the school sanitary department of the People's Commissariat of Education and the institute came under the jurisdiction of the People's Commissariat of Health. On August 29, 1919, the board of the People's Commissariat of Health adopted a regulation on the Institute of Physical Culture. Its first rector was a specialist in school hygiene and physical education, Doctor of Sciences (1903), Professor (1918) Varnava Efimovich Ignatyev. At the institute, he headed the department of school hygiene.

On December 1, 1920, by decree of the Council of People's Commissars of the RSFSR, signed by V. I. Lenin, it was established as a higher "educational institution of the People's Commissariat of Health". The Moscow Institute of Physical Culture received the status of the Central Institute (GCIFK).

The first curriculum included the study of dynamic anatomy, physiology, physiological chemistry, hygiene, psychology, gymnastics, labor processes, sequential exercises, Swedish gymnastics, Lesgaft exercises, plasticity, rhythm, fencing, choral singing, musical culture, expressive speech, carpentry and bookbinding. In the first decade of the institute's work, the proportion of medical and biological subjects in the curriculum was higher than that of specialized sports disciplines.

Since 1921, on the initiative of the institute's teachers, a sports club of the institute was organized. The institute's athletes participated in Moscow and USSR championships, made long-distance skiing and cycling trips, and were involved in mountaineering and parachuting.

From the 1925/26 academic year, the institute switched to a four-year term of study. The curriculum focused on training physical education instructors, specialists in medical supervision and therapeutic physical education.

In 1930, the institute was transferred from the People's Commissariat of Health system to the All-Union Council of Physical Culture (VSFC), and from 1936 to the All-Union Committee for Physical Culture and Sports under the Council of People's Commissars of the USSR.

By the beginning of the 1941/42 academic year, only 240 students (mostly girls) and 50 teachers remained at the institute. During the Great Patriotic War, the work of the institute received a new content and was subordinated to the tasks of wartime - to provide all possible assistance to the Red Army in achieving victory over the enemy. Faculties were liquidated, and the curriculum and programs for all disciplines were given a military-applied character, such subjects as military field gymnastics, military ski training, hand-to-hand combat, overcoming obstacles, swimming and swimming, grenade throwing were introduced, the volume of teaching the methods of therapeutic physical education and therapeutic massage was increased. Along with the basic sciences, much attention was paid to the military-physical training of students, as well as the training of reserve nurses and therapeutic physical education methodologists. The institute trained 113 thousand ski fighters and 5 thousand ski instructors, tens of thousands of fighters were trained in hand-to-hand combat, overcoming obstacles, swimming and grenade throwing. In total, about 340 thousand people underwent military physical training. More than 100 students and teachers worked in hospitals. They provided medical care to wounded soldiers and officers. The institute trained over 160 qualified specialists in therapeutic physical training and therapeutic massage. Many students were donors and donated their blood for the needs of the army.

In October 1941, the institute was evacuated to Sverdlovsk, where only 140 people began their studies. An additional recruitment was announced, and 61 students were enrolled in the first year, and in the following academic year, 200 people were admitted to the institute. In the 1943/44 academic year, the largest enrollment in the pre-war history of the institute was made - 700 people, and in the last year of the war the institute was fully staffed with students.

In February 1943, the institute returned to Moscow. On August 30, 1943, the Lenin Military Faculty of the Stalin State Institute of Physical Culture was awarded the Order of the Red Banner for outstanding achievements in training commanders-specialists in physical training of the Red Army and direct participation in the battles for the Motherland.

Since 1945, the school of coaches with departments of track and field, skiing, sports games, gymnastics, swimming, motor sports and mountaineering has resumed its work at the institute. The school of coaches accepted people with an education of at least 10 grades and a sports category of at least the second, and special and evening departments were also opened within the school. The school itself was equated to teacher training institutes. At the end of 1947, the first admission of coaches to the school in the football department was carried out.

Since 1946, the pedagogical and sports departments were again organized at the institute. In the following years, the following were created at the institute: the correspondence department and the department for advanced training of physical education personnel with higher physical education (1947), the School of Higher Sports Mastery (1949) and the evening education department (1959). The institute was granted the right to accept and defend dissertations for the degree of candidate of science.

In the post-war period, the research work of the institute fully complied with the instructions on the development of problems of physical education, mass sports work and sports mastery. Particular attention was paid to the study of the theory, methodology and technique of sports. In connection with the participation of Soviet athletes in the Olympic Games, world championships, European and other international competitions, the scale of scientific research on these problems significantly expanded. Based on the results of the research conducted, the institute's scientists created and published works of great importance for the theory and practice of physical education and sports, as well as many textbooks and teaching aids for physical education institutes and technical schools.

In 1961, the institute's museum was opened with an extensive and diverse exhibition, which reflects the history of the institute from the day of its foundation.

In 1967, a faculty for the improvement of coaching and teaching staff was opened at the State Central Institute of Physical Culture and Sport. In 1968, the institute switched to a new form of training specialists. In accordance with the practical needs of the physical education movement, instead of the sports and pedagogical faculties, the following faculties were created: mass sports, combat sports, winter and technical sports, sports games. The institute began to graduate teachers and coaches, highly qualified specialists in sports.

In the 1960s, a stadium in Izmailovo, founded in the early 1930s as the Central Stadium of the USSR named after I.V. Stalin, was completed for training classes according to the project of the architect B.M. Iofan. From 1968 to 1970, GTsOLIFK moved to a new building on Sirenevy Boulevard.

== Names ==
- 1918 – Moscow State University of Physical Education
- 1920 – State Central Institute of Physical Education (SCIPE)
- 1934 – State Central Order of Lenin Institute of Physical Education (SCOLIPE)
- 1937 – State Central Order of Lenin Institute of Physical Education "Marshal Joseph Stalin"
- 1961 – State Central Order of Lenin Institute of Physical Education (SCOLIPE)
- 1993 – Russian State Academy of Physical Education (RSAPE)
- 2001 – Russian State University of Physical Education, Sport, Youth and Tourism (RSUPESY&T)

== Notable alumni ==
Many graduates are European, World, Olympic and Paralympic champions:

=== Concentration ===
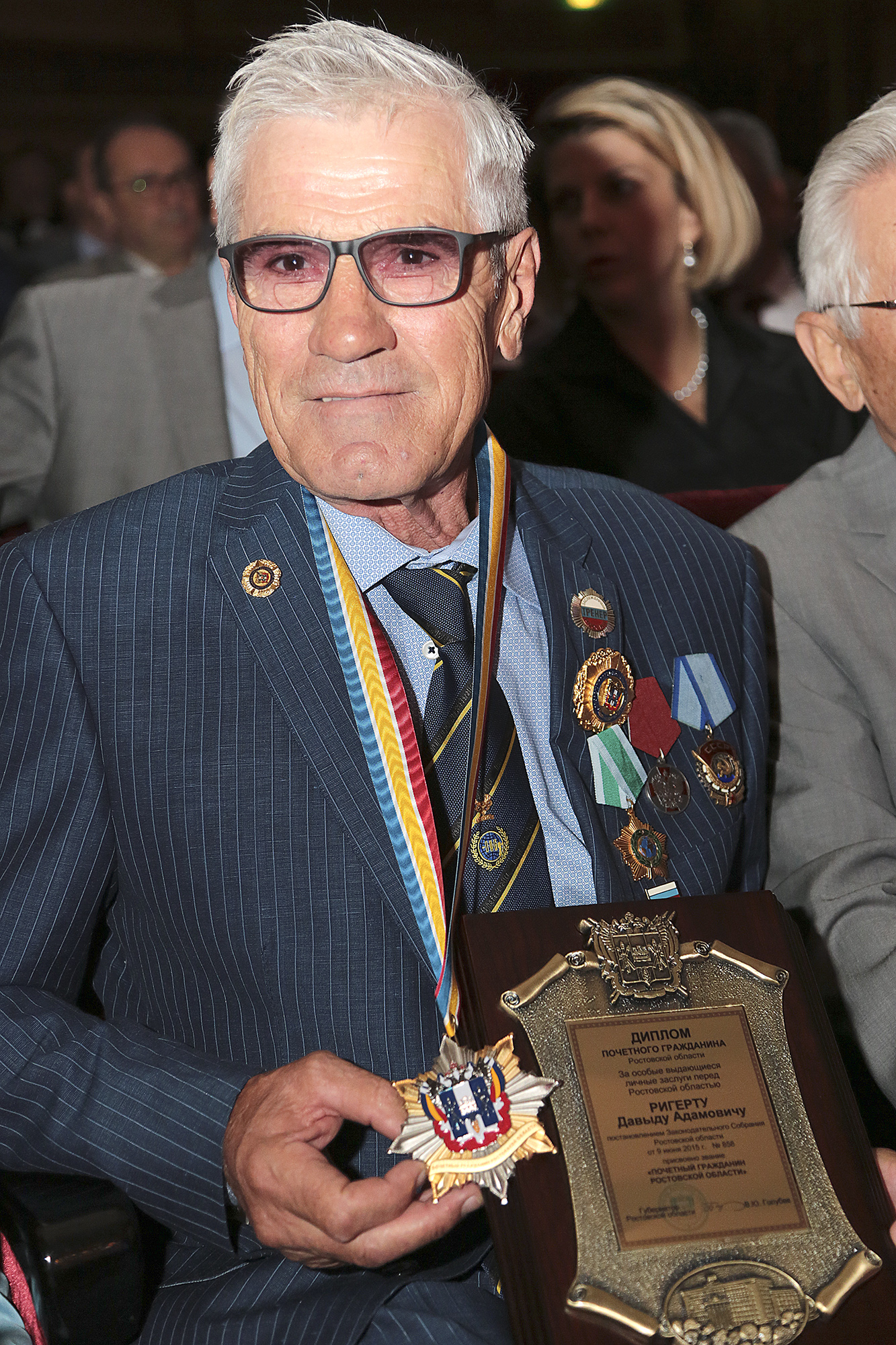
David Rigert

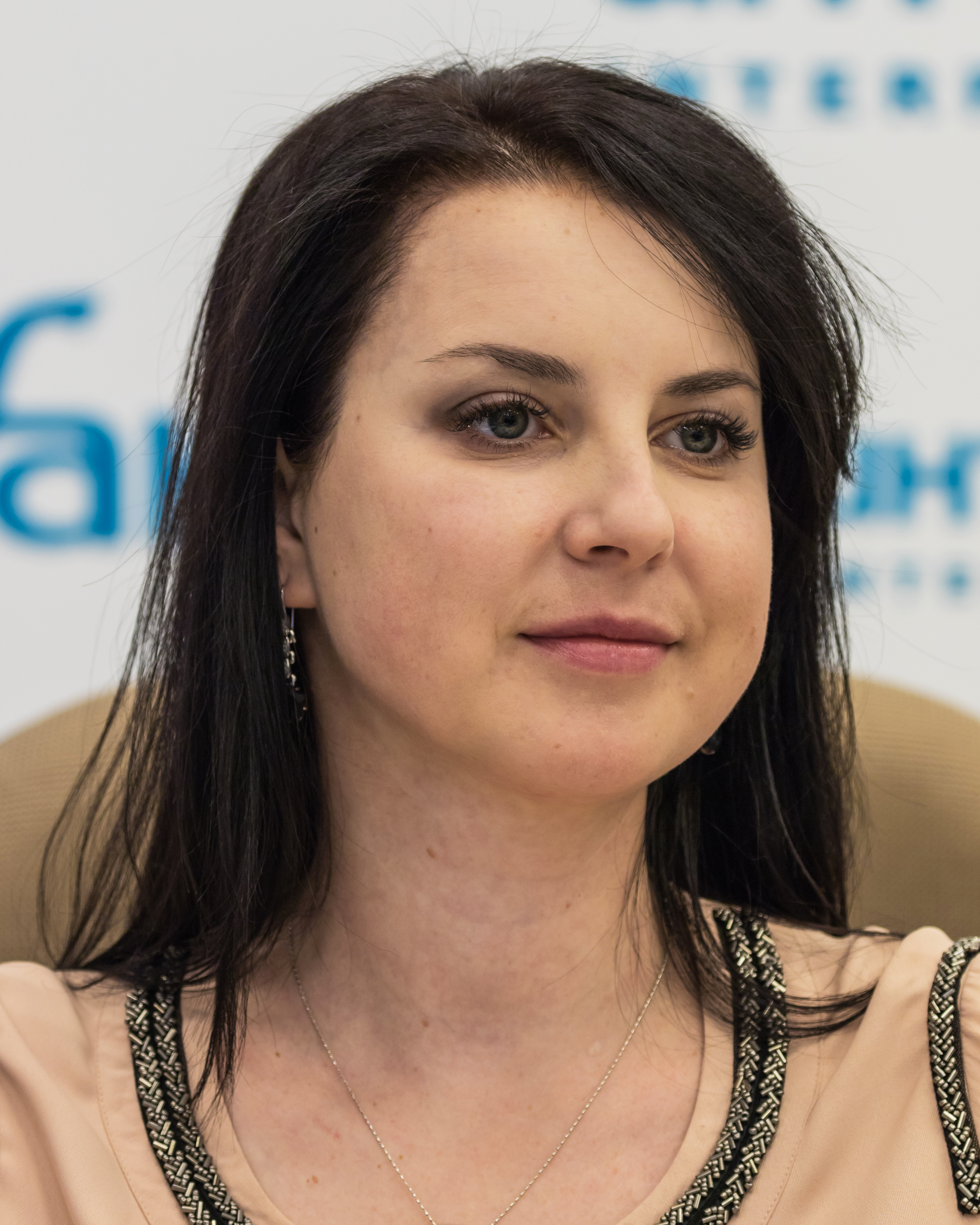
Irina Slutskaya

- Athletics: Valery Brumel, Svetlana Kriveleva, Natalia Lisovskaya, Pyotr Bolotnikov
- Biathlon: Olga Zaitseva, Anfisa Reztsova
- Bobsleigh: Alexey Negodaylo
- Chess: Yuri Balashov, Viktor Bologan, Miron Sher
- Cycling: Yuri Kashirin
- Diving: Elena Vaytsekhovskaya
- Fencing: Sergey Bida, Aleksey Frosin, Valentina Rastvorova, Sergey Sharikov, David Tyshler
- Figure skating:Irina Rodnina, Andrey Bukin, Natalia Bestemianova, Anna Semenovich, Irina Slutskaya, Ekaterina Gordeeva, Sergei Grinkov, Maria Butyrskaya, Gennady Karponosov, Irina Moiseeva, Alexandra Trusova.
- Football: Lev Yashin, Dmitri Sychev, Devidas Shemberas
- Judo: Dmitriy Nosov
- Hockey: Aleksey Morozov, Alexander Ovechkin, Ilya Kovalchuk, Pavel Bure, Valery Kharlamov,
- Rowing: Alexander Timoshinin
- Skiing: Olga Zavyalova
- Speed skating: Oleg Goncharenko, Svetlana Zhurova
- Synchronized swimming: Olga Brusnikina
- Wrestling: Boris Gurevich, Nikolai Balboshin
- Weightlifting: David Adamovich Rigert

=== Other ===
- Andrey Guryev, billionaire, former CEO of PhosAgro

== Notable faculty ==
- David Tyshler (1927–2014), Ukrainian/Soviet Olympic bronze medalist fencer

== Selected departments and specializations ==
=== Chess ===
Grigory Goldberg (1908–1976), in 1966, was the founding head of the postbaccalaureate program in chess which initially was organized as an academic specialization of the institution. In 1974, the specialization program was upgraded to the Chess Department that offered a Master of Sport in Chess. The chess program is chronicled as the first in the history of higher education.

The Master of Sports in Chess should not be confused with the title and rank, Master of Sports of the USSR in Chess, which was established for men in 1934 and for women in 1950. From 1934 through 1987, the USSR conferred 1,061 Master of Sport in Chess titles – 904 to men and 157 to women. The Master of Sport of the USSR was a nationally distinguished rank and title for many major sports of the former Soviet Union.

Heads of the chess program
Years	Name
1966–1975	Grigory Abramovich Goldberg (1908–1976).
1977–1982	GM Yakov Estrin (1923–1987).
1982–1983	GM Nikolai Krogius (Russian: Николай Владимирович Крогиус) (born 1930) earned a PhD in psychology in 1969 from Leningrad State University and established himself as a scholar in cognition during conflicts. Krogius is recognized as a pioneer in research on the psychology of the chess game. He has published about 20 of his books and 150 articles on the topic. In Russian psychology, Krogius's notable works include "Personality in Conflict" and Psychology of Chess Creativity. In 1998, Krogius emigrated with his family to the United States.
1990–2010	Evgeny Pavlovich Linovitsky (Russian: Евгений Павлович Линовицкий) (born 1935), a rocket engineer, military pilot, and former major general in the Soviet Strategic Missile Forces. He was a 1968 graduate of the Military Engineering Academy named after F. Dzerzhinsky. He was a recipient of the Soviet Order of the Red Banner of Labor for unique combat training missile launches.

== Notes and references ==
=== References ===
- Dvoretsky, Mark Izrailovich (2012). "Институт Физкультуры: Тренер-Почасовик" [Institute of Physical Culture: Hourly Trainer]. In Барский, Владимир Леонидович [in Russian] (ed.). Книга Для Друзей И Коллег [A Book for Friends and Colleagues]. Moscow: Андрей Ельков. p. 51. ISBN 9785990235250. OCLC 808348716 – via 64ab.ru (Saint Petersburg). Note: the author states that the Chess Department founded in 1966 by Grigory Goldberg at the State Central Institute of Physical Culture of the Order of Lenin was (inferring from a translation) the first comprehensive academic chess program in higher education in the world. (publisher link – Андрей Ельков)
- Krogius, Nikolay Vladimirovich (1981). Психология Шахматного Творчества [Psychology of Chess Creativity] (in Russian). Moscow: State Central Order of Lenin Institute of Physical Education. OCLC 8316583. (Total Pages: 181).
- Linovitsky, Evgeny Pavlovich (1993). "КАФЕДРЕ ШАХМАТ – ДЕСЯТЬ ЛЕТ" [Chess Chair – Ten Years]. Труды Ученых ГЦОЛИФКа – 75 Лет: Ежегодник [Works of Scientist of the Russian State University of Physical Education, Sport, Youth and Tourism – 75th Anniversary: Yearbook] (digital online) (in Russian). Moscow. pp. 309–316.
- Riordan, James (1977). Sport in Soviet Society: Development of Sport and Physical Education in Russia and the USSR. Cambridge University Press. ISBN 978052128023-5.
- Soltis, Andrew (2014) [2000]. "Tough Examiners: Beyond Maestro". Soviet Chess 1917–1991. McFarland & Company. ISBN 9781476611235. OCLC 41940198. (Total Pages: 450).
