= Guryev =

Guryev (Russian: Гурьев) is a Russian-language surname. The feminine form is Guryeva (Russian: Гурьева). It may refer to:

== Guryev ==
- Andrey Guryev (b. 1960), Russian businessman
- Andrey Guryev Jr., Russian businessman
- Dmitry Guryev (1758–1825), Russian statesman and Minister of Finance
- Stepan Guryev (1902–1945), Soviet general, Hero of the Soviet Union
- Viktor Gurjev (1914–1985), Estonian opera singer and pedagogue

== Guryeva ==
- Anjela Gourieva (born 1980), Russian female volleyball player
- Anastasiia Gureva (born 2005), Russian tennis player
- Lyudmila Guryeva (born 1977), Kazakhstani biathlete
- Maria Nesselrode, née Guryeva (1786–1849), Russian courtier and lady-in-waiting
- Polina Guryeva (born 1999), Turkmen weightlifter
- Yelena Guryeva (born 1958), Russian field hockey player
