= Alfa Nero =

Super yacht formerly owned by a Russian oligarch

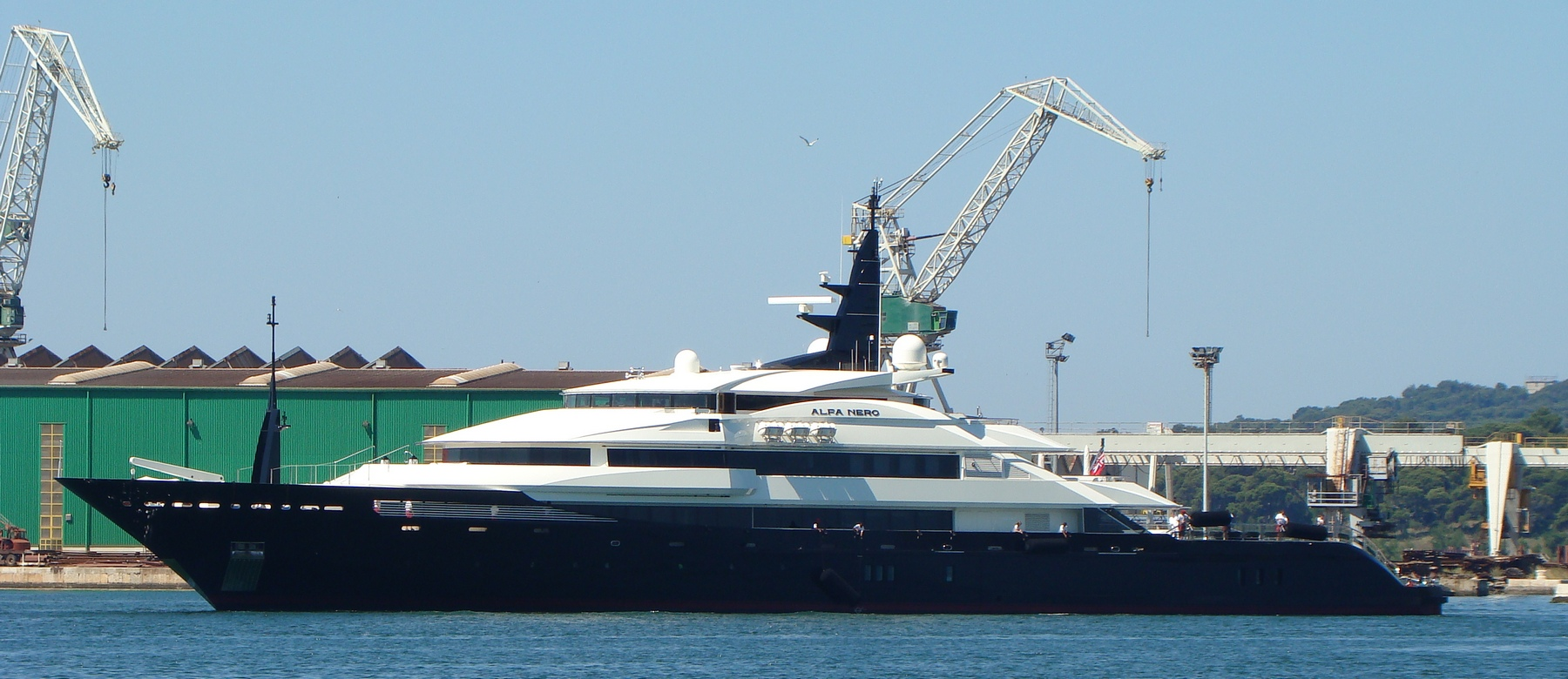
- Alfa Nero in 2008

History

Cayman Islands
- Name: Alfa Nero
- Namesake: Nero
- Owner: M&M Yachting Inc
- Port of registry: Cayman Islands
- Builder: Oceanco Yachts
- Yard number: Y702
- Launched: 2007
- Identification: IMO number: 1009376; MMSI number: 319957000; International callsign: ZCTL4
- Status: offered for sale in Turkey

General characteristics
- Type: Megayacht
- Tonnage: 2,500 GT; 482 LT DWT
- Length: 82 m (269 ft)
- Beam: 14.2 m (47 ft)
- Draught: 3.9 m (13 ft)
- Installed power: 2 × 4,680 shaft horsepower (3,490 kW)
- Propulsion: 2 × MTU 595 TE 70
- Speed: 21 knots (39 km/h; 24 mph)
- Range: 6,630 miles (10,670 km; 5,760 nmi)
- Crew: 26 crew; 12 guests

Alfa Nero is a super yacht built in 2007.

In 2022, Forbes reported that the ship was owned by Andrey Guryev. In June 2023 Alfa Nero was sold to former Google CEO Eric Schmidt for $67.6 million during an auction by the government of Antigua and Barbuda, after it had been abandoned there following the imposition of economic sanctions as a result of the Russian invasion of Ukraine. Schmidt pulled out of the purchase due to lawsuits over title to the yacht.

Since the planned sale, Guryev's daughter, Yulia Guryeva-Motlokhov, has filed a suit claiming that she is the vessel's true owner, that it was never abandoned, and that the yacht's seizure and sale violated procedure.

== History and design ==
Alfa Nero was designed by Nuvolari & Lenard and built by Oceanco in 2007. The interior of Alfa Nero was designed by Alberto Pinto.

Alfa Nero can accommodate 12 guests and up to 26 crew, and has over 4,000 square feet (370 m^{2}) of living space. The yacht features a 12-by-38-foot (3.7 m × 11.6 m) pool on the aft deck that can, through a hydraulic system, transform into a dance floor or a helipad. Alfa Nero has a range of 6,630 miles (10,670 km; 5,760 nmi) at 15 knots (28 km/h; 17 mph), and can reach speeds of up to 21 knots (39 km/h; 24 mph). Alfa Nero was refitted in 2013.

The master suite occupies the entire forward aspect of the upper deck, which is private and self-contained. Inside the suite, colours are pale and the space has opulent design. Other suites have coordinated colours. Designers Nuvolari and Lenard planned the saloons, including dining saloons. The full beam upper saloon has palatial design, while the main deck saloon is contemporary. On the top deck, with views through 180 degree windows, is a diversion gym, while on the lower deck there is a health and beauty spa.

== Ownership ==
In September 2009, it was reported that Alfa Nero was being listed for sale for $190,000,000.

According to the United States Department of Justice Alfa Nero was bought by Russian oligarch Andrey Guryev in 2014, who later denied ownership. After sanctions hit in 2022 the ship was stuck in Falmouth Harbour in the Caribbean. It was declared abandoned in March 2023 by the Antigua and Barbuda government, after several of the crew had left over unpaid wages. Repeated international notices to find the owner were not answered the government seized the vessel. Left with monthly upkeep cost of up to $ 100,000 Antigua and Barbuda decided to put Alfa Nero up for auction.

The ship was auctioned off in June 2023. Former Google CEO Eric Schmidt placed the winning bid for $ 67.6 million. He withdrew this bid in September 2023. Attempts by Yulia Guryeva-Matlakhov, the daughter of Andrey Guryev, to claim ownership and void the auction failed. In July 2024 the government sold the ship with a private treaty to an unnamed individual for an alleged sum of $ 40 million.

The buyer was later identified as Turkish businessman Ali Riza Yildirim, who had the ship transferred to Samsun. Yulia Guryeva-Matlakhov filed another set of lawsuits in Russia and Antigua and Barbuda, this time aiming to be compensated for the loss of the vessel with assets the Yildirim group held in Russia. The ship was again listed for sale in 2025 for $ 103 million.

== See also ==
- List of yachts built by Oceanco
