= LFP =

LFP may refer to:

== Places ==
- Lake Forest Park, Washington, USA; a city
- Little Five Points, a district of Atlanta, Georgia, USA

== Groups, organizations, companies ==
- Labor–Farm Party of Wisconsin, former political party
- Larry Flynt Publications, American adult entertainment company and magazine publisher
- Library Freedom Project, a North American anti-surveillance advocacy group
- Liga Nacional de Fútbol Profesional, governing body of principal football leagues in Spain
- Ligue de Football Professionnel, governing body of principal football leagues in France
- Local Food Plus, a Canadian nonprofit organization
- The London Free Press, a daily newspaper in London, Ontario
- Lycée Français de Prague, a French international school in Prague, Czech Republic

== In mathematics, science, technology ==
- Least fixed point, in mathematics
- Light-field picture, a photograph taken by a light-field camera
  - The file format used by Lytro light-field cameras.
- Lisp and Functional Programming, a conference in computer science that merged into the International Conference on Functional Programming in 1996
- Lithium iron phosphate
  - Lithium iron phosphate battery
- Local field potential, in neuroscience and biochemistry, a measurement of cortical activity
- Large format printer, a digital printer usually up to 100" wide. Also known as wide-format printer

== See also ==
- IFP (disambiguation)
- FP (disambiguation)
