= Lytvynenko =

Lytvynenko (Ukrainian: Литвиненко) is a surname of Ukrainian origin. It is sometimes transliterated as Litvinenko. It may refer to:

- Bohdan Lytvynenko (born 2003), Ukrainian footballer
- Dmytro Lytvynenko (born 1987), Ukrainian futsal player
- Ivan Lytvynenko (born 2001), Ukrainian footballer
- Leonid Lytvynenko (born 1949), Ukrainian decathlete
- Oleksandr Lytvynenko (born 1990), Ukrainian para-athlete
- Oleksandr Lytvynenko (1977–2008), Ukrainian sprint canoeist
- Oleksandr Lytvynenko, Ukrainian politician
- Vasyl Lytvynenko (born 1991), Ukrainian footballer
- Vitaliy Lytvynenko (born 1970), Ukrainian ice hockey player
- Yulia Lytvynenko (born 1976), Ukrainian politician

== See also ==
- 18120 Lytvynenko, minor planet
