= VL15 =

Soviet locomotive

VL15 ВЛ15
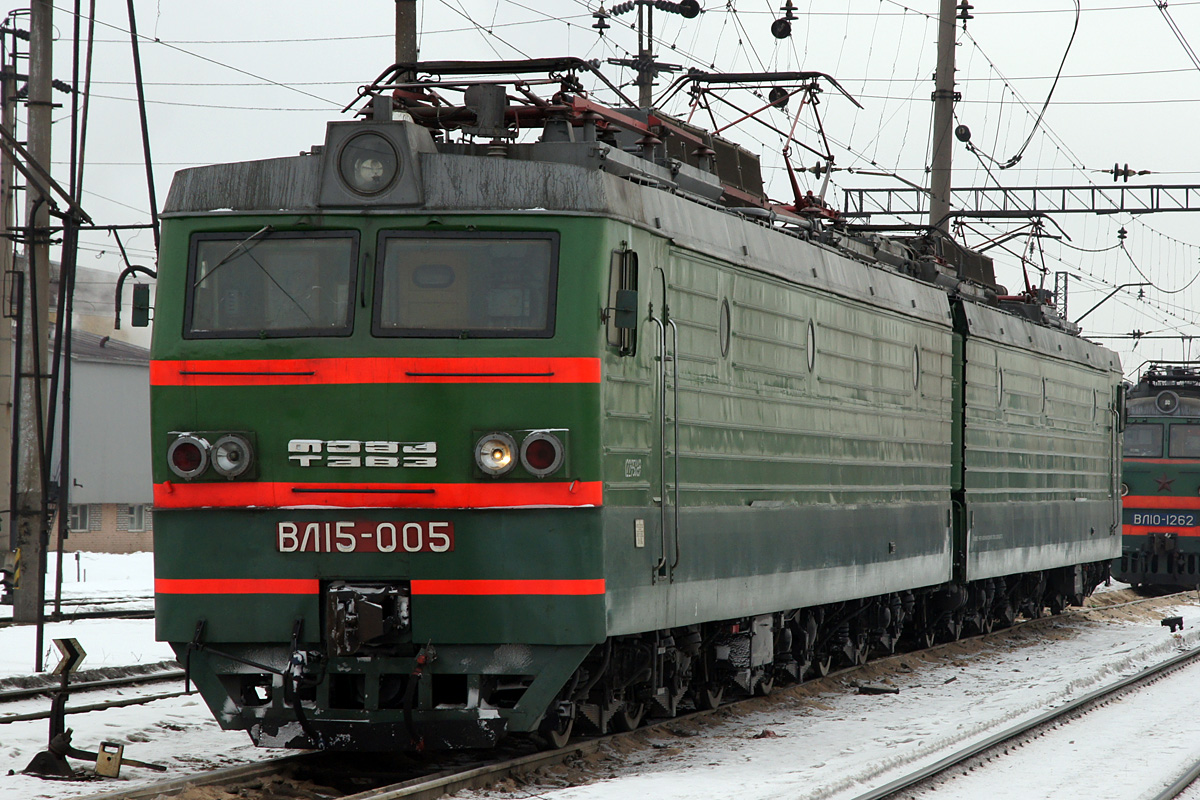
- VL15-005
Type and origin
- Builder: (Soviet Union) Tbilisi Electric Locomotive Works (Main equipment) (Soviet Union) Novocherkassk Electric Locomotive Plant (Mechanical part)
- Build date: 1984 - 1991
- Total produced: 50
Specifications
- Configuration
  - UIC: Bo'Bo'Bo'+Bo'Bo'Bo'
- Gauge: 1,524 mm (5 ft); 1,520 mm (4 ft 11 27/32 in) Russian gauge
- Wheel diameter: 1,250 mm (4 ft 1 in)
- Length: 45.00 m (147 ft 8 in)
- Width: 3.180 m (10 ft 5.2 in)
- Loco weight: 300 t (300 long tons; 330 short tons)
- Electric system/s: 3 kV DC Catenary
- Current pickup(s): Pantograph
- Traction motors: 12×ТЛ-3 (en: TL-3)
- Loco brake: Regenerative (Except VL15A)
Performance figures
- Maximum speed: 100 km/h (62 mph)
- Power output: 8,400 kW (11,300 hp) (Continuous); 9,000 kW (12,000 hp) (Short Term)
Career
- Operators: РЖД (RZhD); Apatit
- Locale: Russia; Soviet Union

The VL15 (Russian: ВЛ15) is a Soviet built electric mainline freight locomotive manufactured at the Tbilisi Electric Locomotive Works. The power supply was 3 kV Direct Current, and the axle arrangement Bo-Bo-Bo+Bo-Bo-Bo.

All VL15 and VL15S locomotives currently in operation are assigned to the Volkhov Locomotive Depot, October Railway. 5 of 6 VL15A locomotives (VL15A-001 decommissioned) are in operation at the Apatit.

== Gallery ==
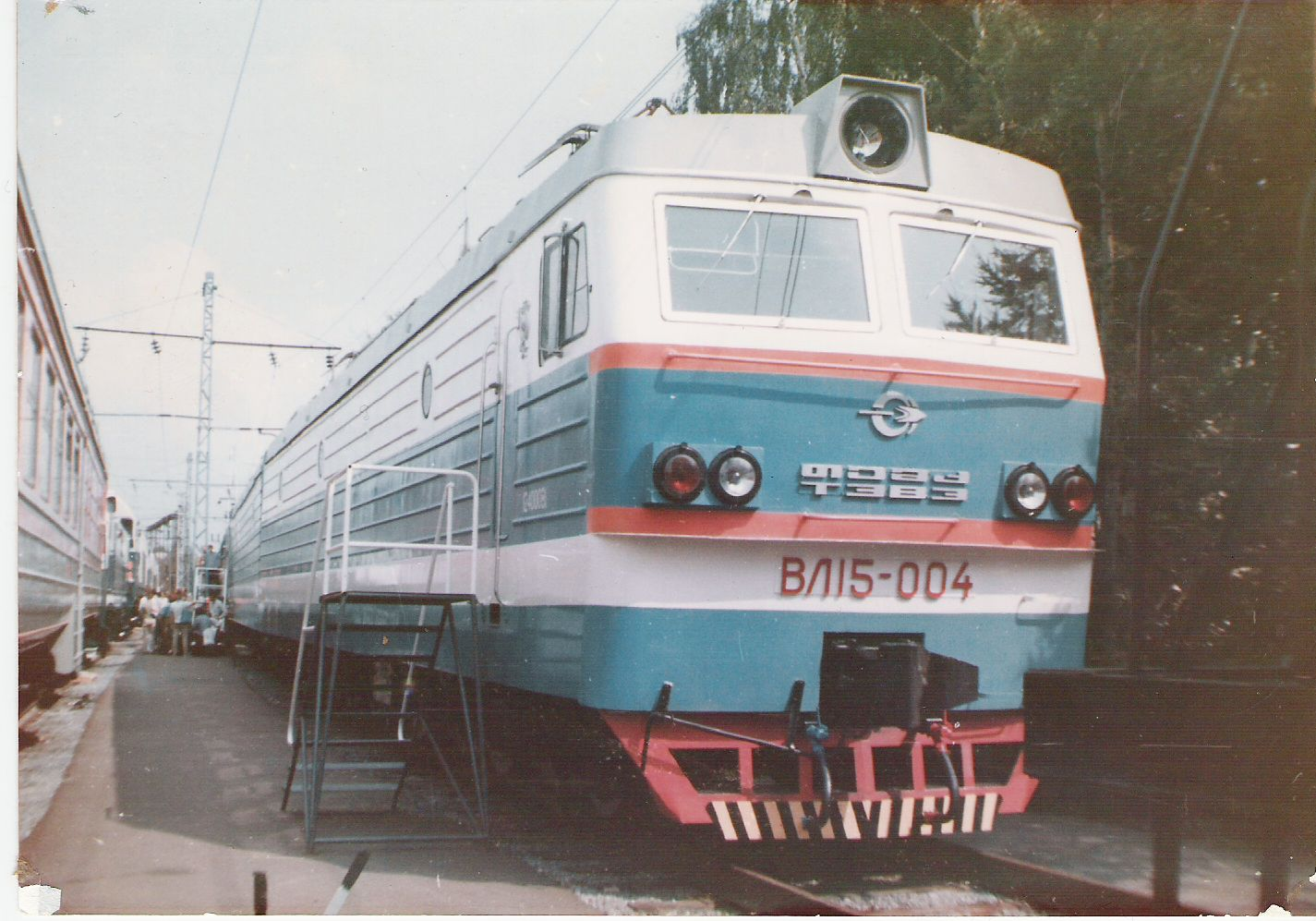
VL15-004 in Scherbinka

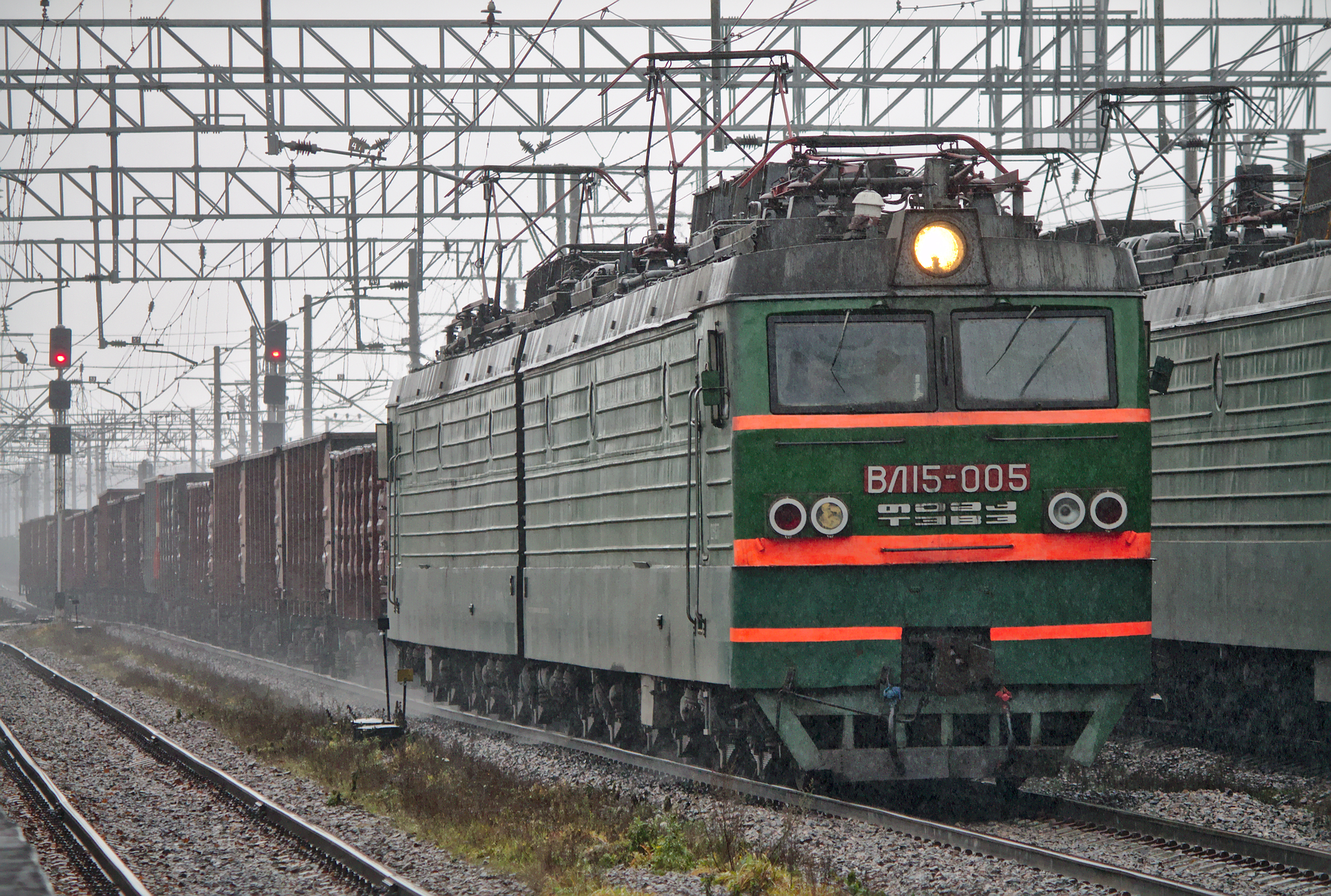
VL15-005

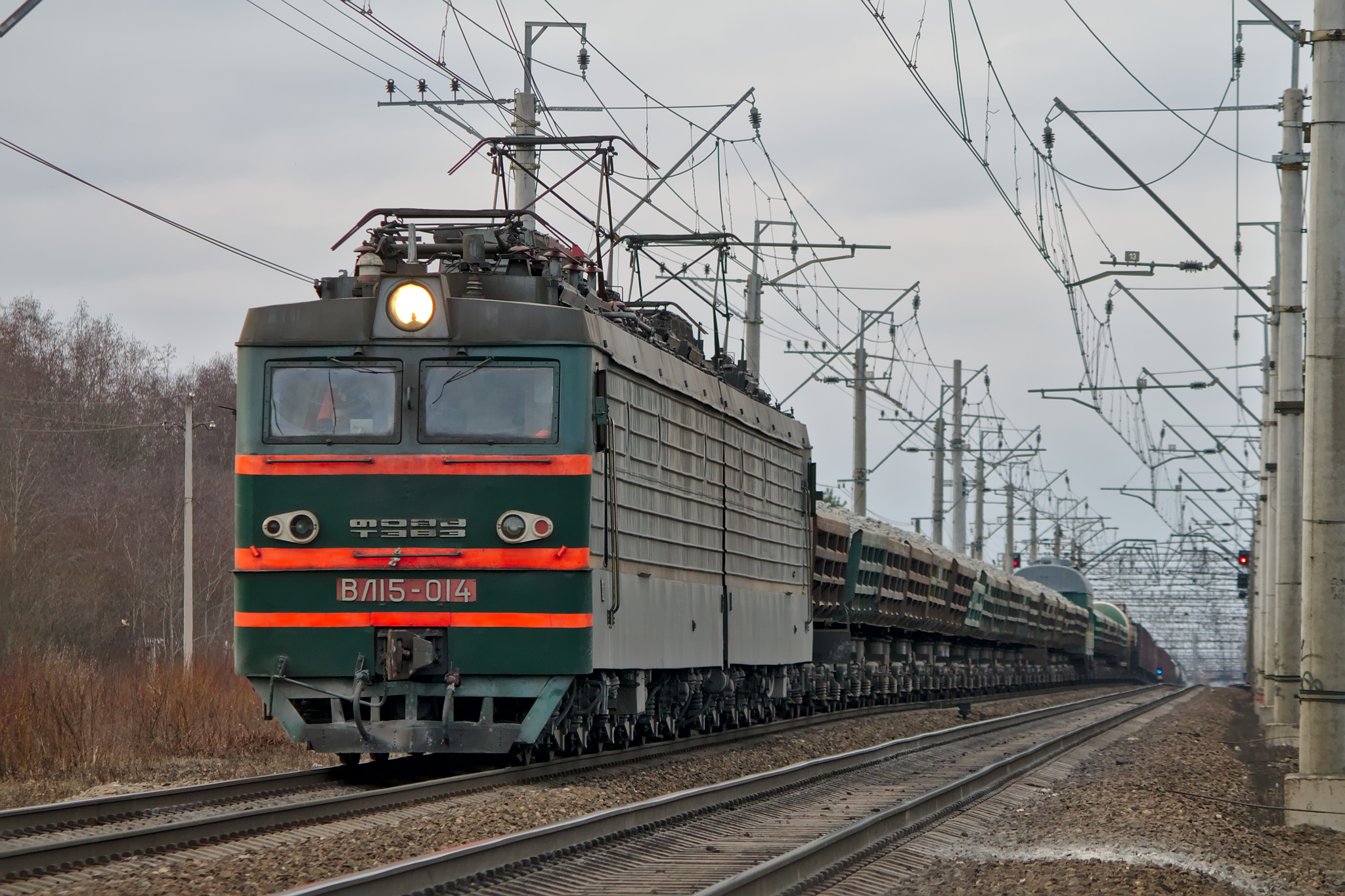
VL15-014

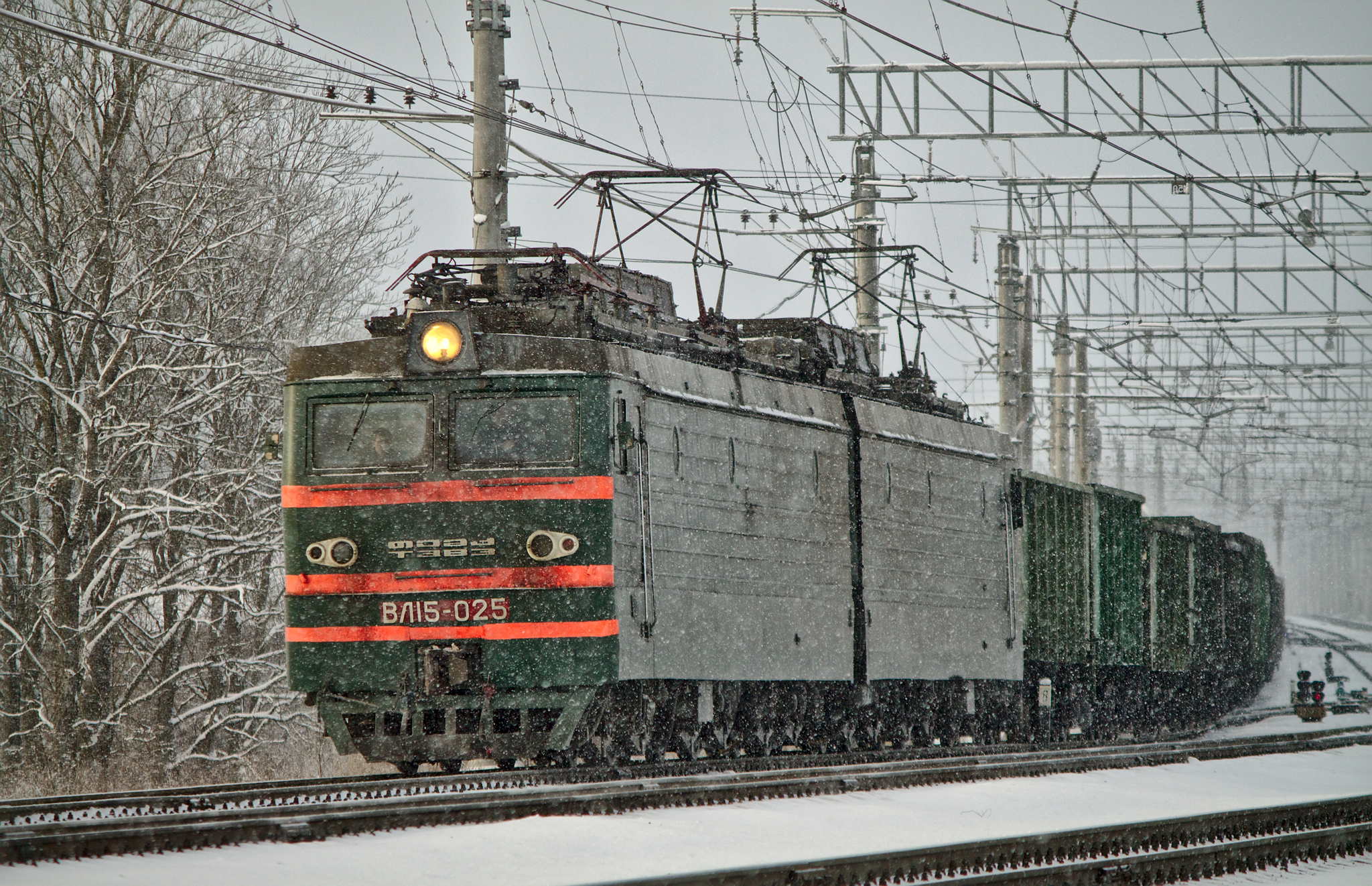
VL15-025

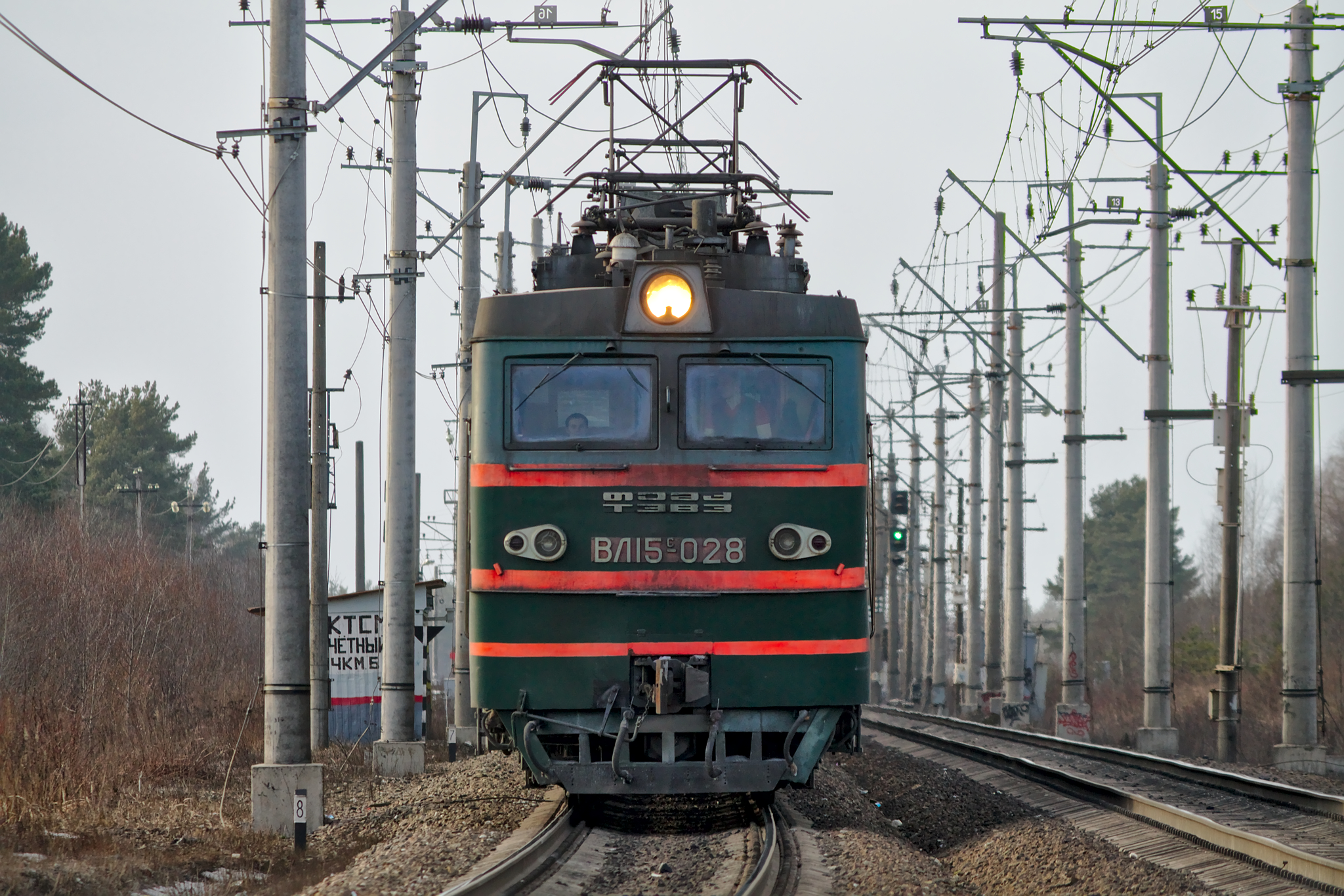
VL15S-028

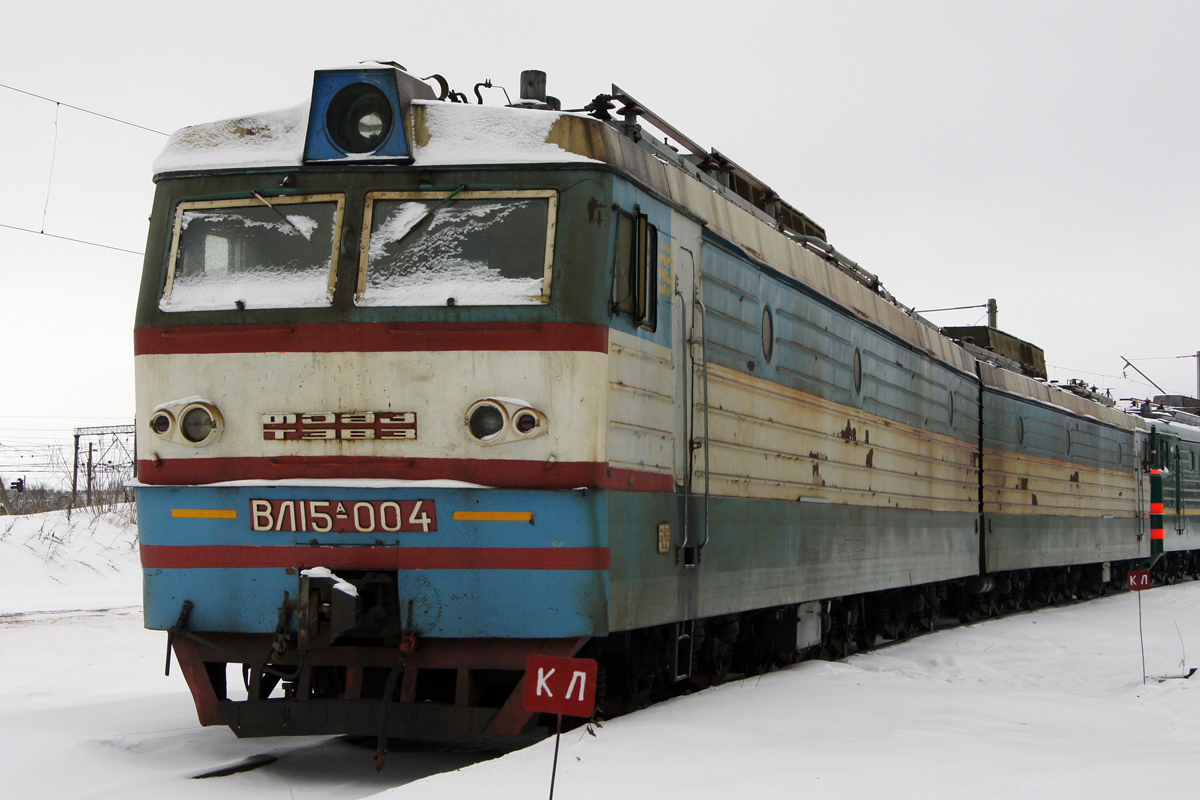
VL15A-004

== Main users ==
VL15s have been used by two users:

- Russian Railways
  - October Railway
- Apatit

== See also ==
- VL10
- VL11
- VL85

== Literatures ==
- М. Ф, Кужим; Н. В, Савичев (2002). Электровоз ВЛ15. Справочник для локомотивных бригад (in Russian).
