= Litvinenko =

Litvinenko (Russian: Литвиненко) is a gender-neutral surname of Ukrainian origin. It may refer to

- Alexander Litvinenko (1962–2006), former Russian secret service agent, defector and recruited to MI6, poisoned in the United Kingdom.
  - Litvinenko (TV series), TV series based on the poisoning of the above
- Alexei Litvinenko (born 1980), Kazakhstani ice hockey defenceman
- Alina Litvinenko (born 1995), Kyrgyzstani football striker
- Irina Ektova (née Litvinenko in 1987), Kazakhstani triple jumper
- Oleg Litvinenko (1973–2007), Kazakhstani association football player
- Olga Litvinenko (born 1983), Russian politician, daughter of Vladimir
- Vladimir Litvinenko (born 1955), Russian academic and businessman, father of Olga
- Vladimir Litvinenko (sledge hockey) (born 1989), Russian sledge hockey player
