= IFP =

IFP may refer to:

== Film ==
- Ian Fleming Publications, a film production company formerly known as both Glidrose Productions Limited and Glidrose Publications Limited
- Independent Filmmaker Project, a series of membership-based, not-for-profit organizations that produce programs that assist independent filmmakers
- India Film Project, Asia's largest content festival based out of India

== Political parties ==
- Independence Freedom Party, a short-lived minor party in Botswana; see Botswana Independence Party
- Inkatha Freedom Party, a right-wing South African political party, founded 1975
- Irish Freedom Party, a far-right party in Ireland

== Research and education ==
- Institute for Progress, an American think tank
- Institut français de presse, the French Press Institute, a public institution of research and higher education, founded in 1937, and part of Panthéon-Assas University since 1970
- Institut français de Pondichéry, the French Institute of Pondicherry
- Institut français du pétrole, the French Institute of Petroleum, a public petroleum and oil research organisation in France, now IFP Energies Nouvelles (IFPEN)
  - IFP School (Institute of French Petroleum School), a graduate engineering school near Paris, France, part of the IFP
- Inventaire fédéral des paysages, sites et monuments naturels d'importance nationale, the Federal Inventory of Landscapes and Natural Monuments, in Switzerland
- Feed phosphates, a chemical that aids optimal growth, fertility, and bone development

== Sports ==
- International Pickleball Federation, previously the International Federation of Pickleball
- International Federation of Poker, a non-profit governing body for poker

== Other ==
- IFP, IATA airport code for Laughlin/Bullhead International Airport, Arizona, US
- IFP-1, intermediate filament protein, a non-essential protein in Caenorhabditis elegans
- Imphal Free Press, an English-language newspaper published in Manipur, India
- In forma pauperis, a designation for indigent parties in court
