= Apatit =

Russian mining company

- Type: joint-stock company
- Founded: 1929
- Headquarters: Kirovsk, Murmansk Oblast
- Products: apatite and nepheline concentrate
- Revenue: 179,900,000 United States dollar (1994)
- Net income: 4.630 billion RUB
- Number of employees: 13,000
- Parent: PhosAgro
- Website: https://www.phosagro.ru/about/holding_kirovsk?sphrase_id=30294

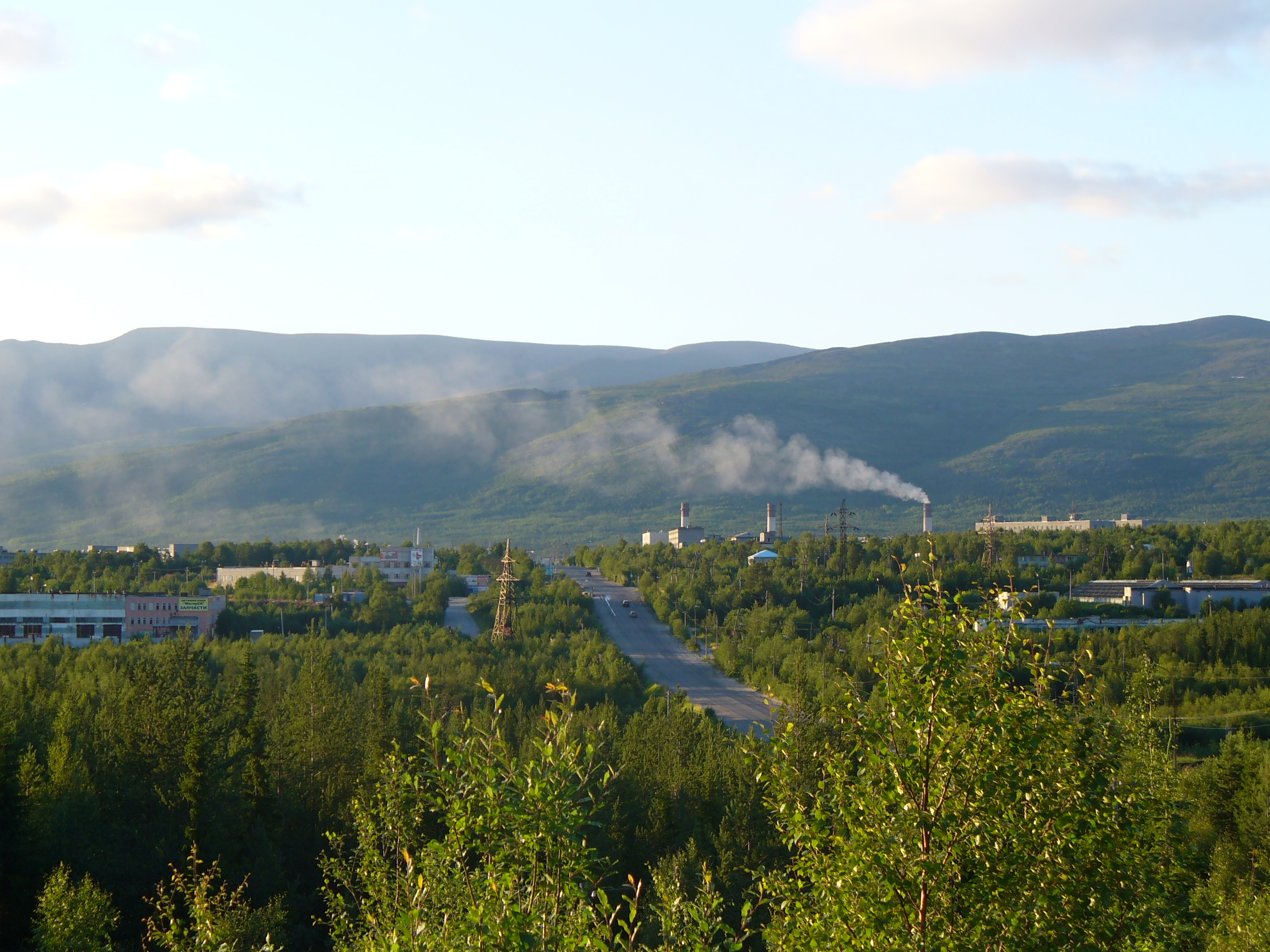
Apatity with the Khibiny Mountains in the background.

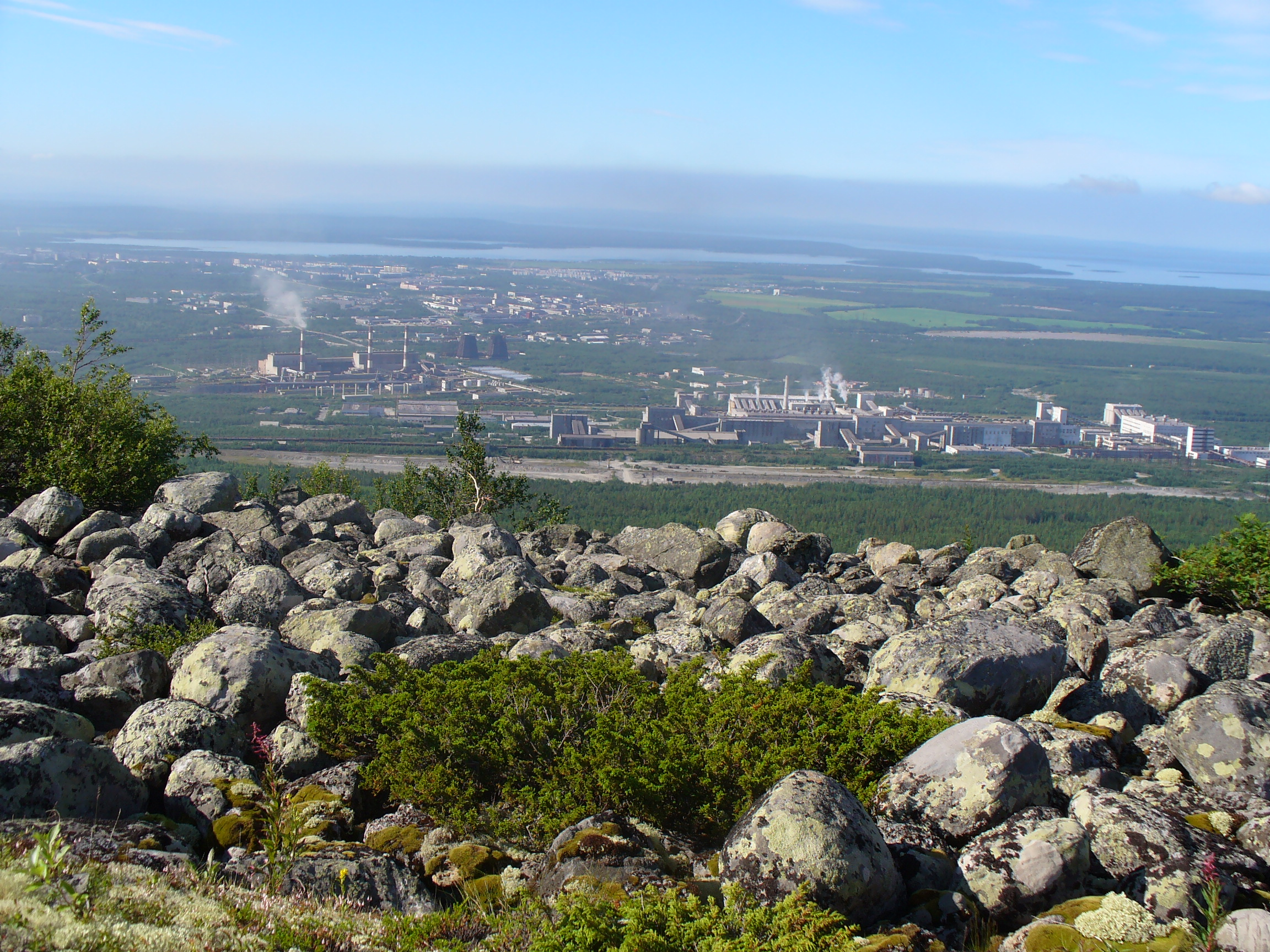
View from the Khibiny Mountains down onto the town of Apatity.

Apatit JSC (Russian: АО «Апатит») is a Russian mining and processing enterprise engaged in the extraction of mineral raw materials for manufacture of chemicals and fertilizers.

Main operations are the mining and processing of mines and processes apatite-nepheline ore from the Khibiny deposit. Products are marketed locally and in Finland, Poland, Norway, Belgium and the Netherlands.

== History ==
"Apatit" was established in 1929. The company is based in Kirovsk, Murmansk Oblast. Its main plants are located in Kirovsk and in Apatity, a town located at a distance of about 23 km from Kirovsk, near the eastern shore of Lake Imandra. Both towns are situated at the foot of the Khibiny Mountains.

=== Developments ===
In the early 1990s, the rapid decline in demand for apatite concentrate led to a significant reduction in production volumes resulting in a struggle of survival for the company. In 1994, only 6 million tonnes of apatite concentrate were produced, compared to 20 million tons in 1988. This deep crisis led to privatization of the company, starting in 1994.

Apatit was owned by Mikhail Khodorkovsky's financial holding company Menatep Group in the late 1990s. Khodorkovsky and business partner Platon Lebedev purchased Apatit in 1994.

Andrei Guriev who ran a department of Rosprom at that time, became chairman of its subsidiary Apatit in 2001. Following the arrest of Khodorkovsky in 2003, Guriev led a management buyout of Apatit and acquired control.

Apatit assets were seized by the state during Khodorkovsky's trial. Andrei Guryev led the sale of PhosAgro and 50% of Apatit to management. PhosAgro later increased its holdings to 57.57% of Apatit. The arrest and subsequent 11-month trial of Khodorkovsky revealed that the focus was not on the alleged 'loans-for-shares' scheme, but rather on claims that the privatization of Apatit in 1994 was itself fraudulent.

At present, JSC "Apatit" is a large Mining and Chemical Complex consisting of four mines, three concentrating mills and various support units. Core production activity is the production of apatite concentrate from apatite-nepheline ore. In the early 2000s, the company employed up to 13,000 people. In 2013, PhosAgro completed the consolidation of 100% of Apatit. Phosagro is controlled by Andrey Guriev together with two other prominent businessmen. A 7% stake in PhosAgro is owned by Igor Antoshin, who also serves as the deputy chair of the holding company. A further 10% is owned by Vladimir Litvinenko.

== See also ==
- Kola Alkaline Province
- PhosAgro — parent company
- Avisma
- Platon Lebedev
- Norra Kärr
