= Vera Velichkina =

Russian physician, writer and revolutionary (1868–1918)

- Вера Величкина
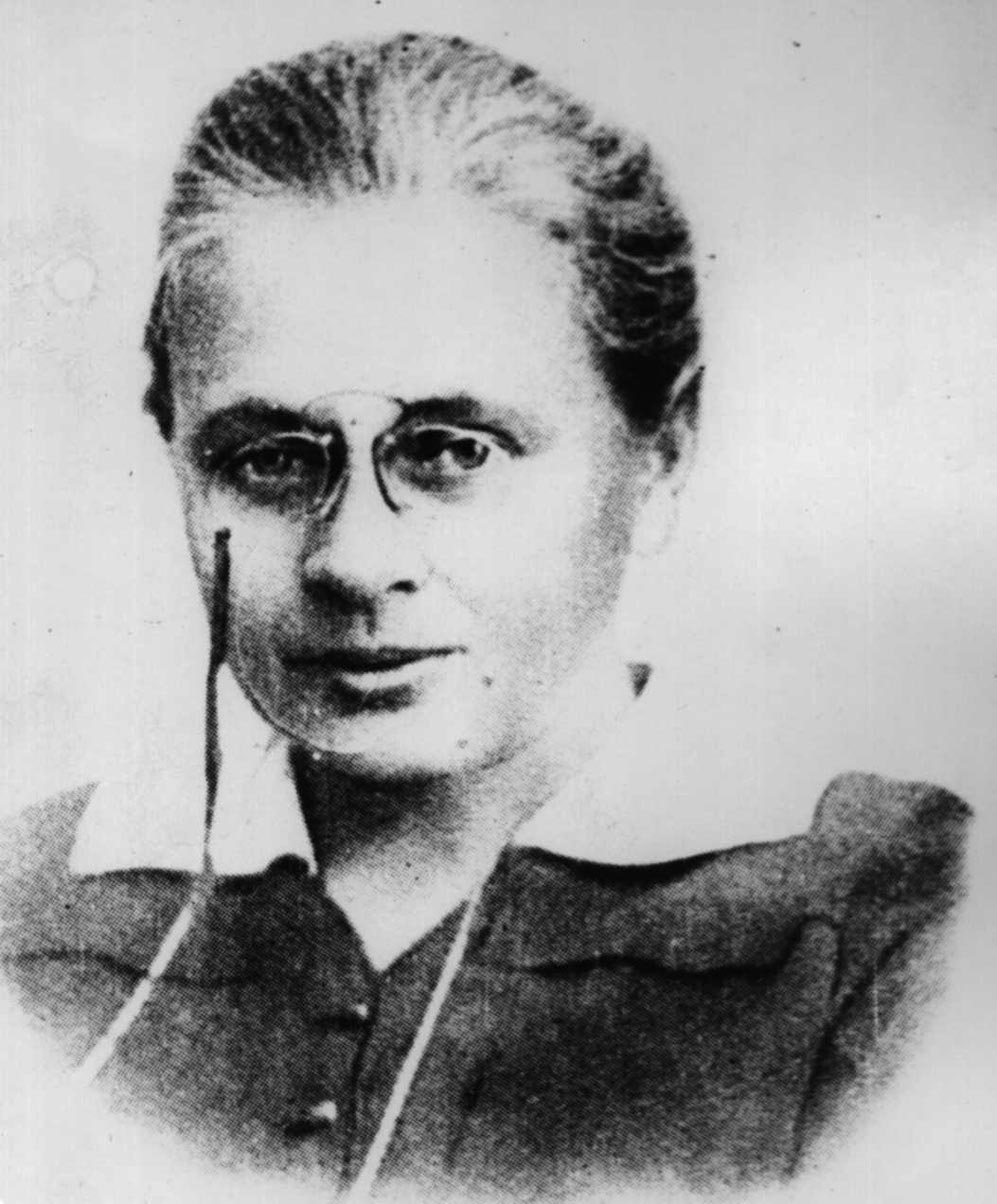
- Born: Vera Mikhailovna Velichkina; 20 September 1868; Moscow, Moscow Governorate, Russian Empire
- Died: 30 September 1918 (aged 50); Moscow, Moscow Governorate, Russian SFSR
- Other name: Vera Bonch-Bruyevich
- Spouse: Vladimir Bonch-Bruyevich

Vera Mikhailovna Velichkina (Russian: Вера Михайловна Величкина; 20 September [O.S. 8 September] 1868 – 30 September 1918) was a Russian politician, physician, writer and revolutionary who was involved with the Bolshevik movement from the 1890s. After the October Revolution, Velichkina was tasked to organise Soviet health services. Velichkina was a personal physician to Vladimir Lenin and was the first wife of politician Vladimir Bonch-Bruyevich.

== Early life and education ==
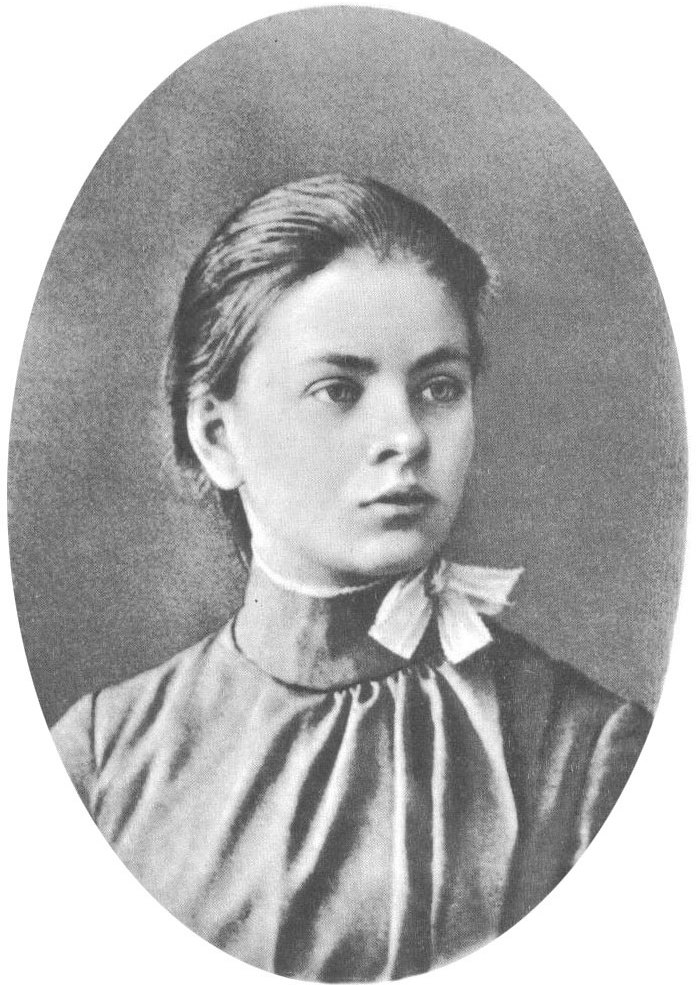
Vera Velichkina c. 1900

Vera Velichkina was born on 20 September [O.S. 8 September] 1868 in Moscow. She was the daughter of a priest and was one of thirteen children. Velichkina completed her secondary education at the 1st Girls' High School in Moscow in 1885, and that same year she began attending pedagogy courses.

Her social activism began during the Russian famine of 1891–1892, where she helped at a famine relief centre in the Ryazan province organised by writer Leo Tolstoy. She met Tolstoy at the centre and began a correspondence with him, becoming strongly influenced by his ideas.

She moved to Switzerland in 1892, to attend medical schools in Bern and Zurich. Whilst there she also became involved with various Russian political immigrants. The Russian secret police noted her connections to revolutionary causes, and she was placed under surveillance during a trip to Moscow in the summer of 1894. She was arrested on 3 October while attempting to leave the city. A search of her family home on the night of 4 October uncovered illegal European literature, and her brother Nikolai and sister Klavdiya were arrested. Vera Velichkina was held in prison until 12 December 1894, when she was released under an amnesty to celebrate Nicholas II's ascension to the Russian throne. However, the case against her was not officially closed until the following year, and she remained under police surveillance for two years.

After her release from prison, she lived in the Voronezh province from autumn 1895 to spring 1896, where she worked as a medical assistant and educator to the local populace. During her time there, she met Vladimir Bonch-Bruyevich, whom she married. She returned to Switzerland with him, where from 1896 to 1898 she completed her medical studies at the University of Bern and obtained her medical degree. She then worked at a children's clinic. Whilst working there, she defended her dissertation about artificial milk for children. Despite receiving offers to stay and work in Switzerland, Velichkina refused them, stating her goal was to return to Russia. However, she left for Canada with her husband in 1899 to provide medical assistance on a Doukhobor emigrant ship. The ship, the Lake Huron was chartered following a campaign by Leo Tolstoy. Velichkina stayed with the emigrants for thirteen months, aiding with administration in addition to medical care.

== Editorial career and activism ==
In 1901, Velichkina quickly returned to Russia due to her mother's illness but she was arrested on the border while attempting to enter at Vezhbolovo on 2 October for organising a demonstration against the repression of student movements outside the Russian consulate in Geneva. She was sent to Kresty Prison in Saint Petersburg. Velichkina was released from prison in January 1902 and she returned to Switzerland in May.

Velichkina returned to Russia in 1905 and worked at the Yevgenyevskaya Red Cross children's hospitals in Saint Petersburg. However, during the First Russian Revolution, but she was again arrested in Saint Petersburg along with members of the Soviet of Workers' Deputies. After her she was kept in solitary confinement without charge. An order for her release was issued by the prosecutor's court, but she remained in prison due to an order from the head of the Saint Petersburg police. As a result, Velichkina went on hunger strike. She was eventually released on 6 March 1906. After her release, she set up a self-education club in 1907 in Saint Petersburg. That same year, together with her husband, she began editing the Marxist publishing house Life and Knowledge.

During World War I, Velichkina spent a year and half as a doctor on the front line and then in a prison camp. She was awarded a 4th class Ribbon of Saint George and a silver medal of the Order of Saint Vladimir for diligence.

== Revolution and administrative career ==
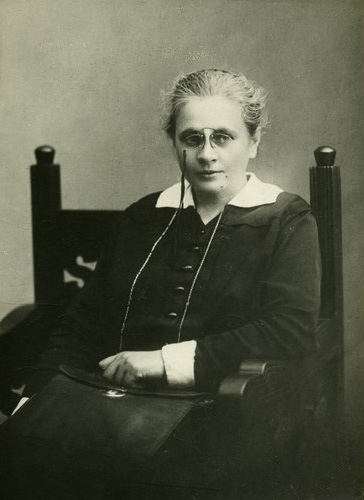

After the February Revolution, Velichkina was named the editorial secretary for the Izvestiia petrogradskogo soveta newspaper. She also became a member of the RSDLP (Bolshevik) committee.

During the October Revolution, at Vladimir Lenin's request, she organised care for wounded Red Guards. She then worked in the medical and health department of the Petrograd Soviet Revolutionary Military Committee. Velichkina then focused her attention on children's healthcare, becaming responsible for school health and hygiene and created a specialised department within the People's Commissariat for Education. She was also one of Lenin's personal physicians.

== Death ==
Vera Velichkina died on 30 September 1918 in Moscow from the Spanish flu, at the age of 50.
