= Andrey Guryev Jr. =

Russian businessman (born 1982)

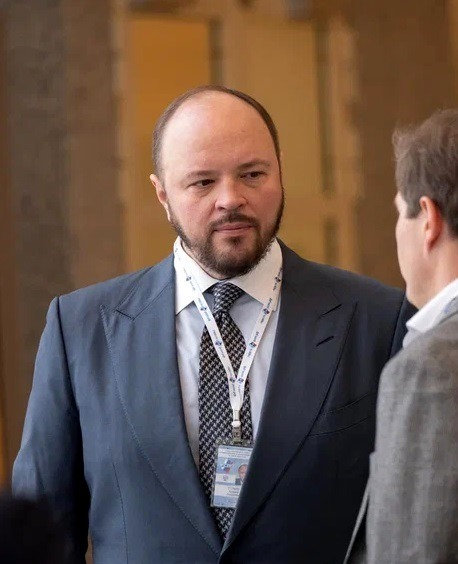
- Born: 7 March 1982 (age 44)
- Occupations: CEO, PhosAgro
- Parent(s): Andrey Guryev and Evgenia
- Relatives: Alexei Motlokhov (brother-in-law)

Andrey Andreevich Guryev Jr. is a Russian businessman. He is the son of Andrey Guryev, a Russian oligarch. Guryev Jr. took over PhosAgro, his father's company. The Guryev family owns nearly 50% of the company.

His father built the company up in during the 1990s following the collapse of the Soviet Union. It is one of the four largest producers of phosphate-based fertilizers in the world.

== Biography ==
He is the son of Andrey Guryev and Evgenia. In May 2015, Forbes estimated his father's net worth at US$3.8 billion.

In 2011, the Guryev family owned 71% of PhosAgro, with 10% owned by Vladimir Litvinenko. The family owned nearly 50% in 2017.

=== Sanctions ===
He was sanctioned by the UK government in 2022 in relation to the Russo-Ukrainian War.

Guryev Jr. was added to the European Sanctions list as of 9 March 2022 for providing a substantial source of revenue to the government of the Russian Federation.

== Personal life ==
He is married to Valeria, who was educated at the London College of Fashion.
