= Alexei Motlokhov =

Russian hedge fund manager (b. 1981/82)

- Born: 1981 or 1982 (age 44–45)
- Occupation: Hedge fund manager
- Spouse: Yulia Guryeva-Motlokhov
- Children: 2
- Relatives: Andrey Guryev (father-in-law); Andrey Guryev Jr. (brother-in-law)

Alexei Motlokhov (Russian: Алексей Мотлохов) (born 1981/82) is a London-based Russian hedge fund manager, and the son-in-law of Russian oligarch Andrey Guryev.

== Early life ==
Alexei Motlokhov is the son of Vladimir Motlokhov, who works for the Russian fertilizer giant, PhosAgro (controlled by Andrey Guryev), and was vice-governor of the Murmansk region from 2000 to 2008, where PhosAgro mines its phosphate. Motlokhov received a PhD in economics in 2006.

== Career ==
Motlokhov runs the hedge fund Kola Capital with Mike Hollings and Ken Ginsburg, and they operate the Cayman Islands-domiciled Kola Global Opportunities Fund, amongst others.

== Personal life ==
Motlokhov is married to Yulia Guryeva-Motlokhov, the daughter of Russian billionaire Andrey Guryev. They have twin sons and live next door to Guryev, who owns Witanhurst in Highgate, London's second largest house after Buckingham Palace.

Motlokhov owns several properties in the U.K. Several local residents wrote to Camden Council about a 57-metre long adventure playground that they were planning to build in their back garden, complaining that "The plans are on a commercial scale and it looks like this will be more like a theme park than a playground."
