= Olga Litvinenko =

Russian politician

Olga Vladimirovna Litvinenko (Russian: Ольга Владимировна Литвиненко; born 1983) is a Russian ex-politician and the daughter of Vladimir Litvinenko, a close friend of Vladimir Putin's and in the words of Olga, "the richest rector in Russia" and an "oligarch". Olga has accused her father of kidnapping her daughter.

== Career ==
Olga was a member of the Legislative Assembly of Saint Petersburg from 2007 to 2011.

== Family and legal dispute ==
Her father Vladimir is the rector of the Saint Petersburg Mining Institute and owns a 5% share in Phosagro, which owns a phosphate mine in the Arctic. The mine had been at one time partly owned by Mikhail Khodorkovsky. Vladimir claims that he did some consulting for the company in 2004 for which he received the shares. The stock is now worth about $260,000,000 after Phosagro was floated on the London Stock Exchange in July 2011. Vladimir Putin went to the Saint Petersburg Mining Institute where he received a degree in 1996, under Vladimir Litvinenko's guidance. Putin has been accused of plagiarising large sections of his dissertation.

In May 2010, Vladimir and his wife Tatyana were looking after Olga's daughter Ester-Maria Litvinenko (born 2009), and refused to give her back to Olga. Olga has described this as a kidnapping and has instigated legal proceedings to get her daughter back. Olga describes her father as "the richest rector in Russia" and an "oligarch" ("самый богатый ректор России, олигарх"). In summer 2011, Vladimir reported to the police that Olga and her other child, Michael Stefan, had been kidnapped and Olga's assets were subsequently frozen. Olga and her other children, Sarah, Dina and Michael Stefan, are living in London. Olga is still fighting to get her daughter Ester-Maria back.
