= Vezhbolovo =

Vezhbolovo Вежболово
- Village
- Location within Vladimir Oblast Location within Russia
- Coordinates: 56°08′N 39°53′E
- Country: Russia
- Region: Vladimir Oblast
- District: Sobinsky District
- Time zone: UTC+3:00

Vezhbolovo (Russian: Вежболово) is a rural locality (or village) in Kurilovskoye Rural Settlement, Sobinsky District, Vladimir Oblast, Russia. The population was 5 as of 2010.

== Geography ==
Vezhbolovo is located on the Vezhbolovka River, 23 km north of Sobinka (the district's administrative centre) by road. Bogatishchevo is the nearest rural locality.
