= Feed phosphates =

Inorganic feed phosphates (IFP) are inorganic salts of phosphoric acid. Inorganic feed phosphates are used to meet the phosphorus requirements for animal production: to ensure optimal growth, fertility and bone development.

== Importance ==
The importance of phosphate (PO^{3−}_{4}) is reflected in the number of metabolic processes in which phosphorus takes part. By far the greatest amount of phosphorus is used to maintain and support the skeleton. About 80% of an animal's phosphorus is located here, co-precipitated with calcium (Ca) in the form of hydroxyapatite complex (Ca_{10}(PO_{4})·6(OH)_{2}), where it acts not only as a support system but also as a reservoir of phosphorus. In the soft tissues, phosphorus is a major component of the cells, membranes and body fluids. It also plays an important role in the energy supply. In addition phosphorus acts as a buffer, is involved in phospholipids and fatty acids transfer and in the formation of amino acids as well as DNA and RNA. Therefore, phosphorus is indispensable for animals.

== Production of IFPs ==
Phosphates occur widely in nature mostly as phosphate rock or fluorapatite. There are large deposits in Russia, USA, North Africa, and China, where they are obtained mostly by open cast mining. Over 85% is used in fertiliser production, and only less than 7% in feed phosphate production. Two types of deposits exist: of volcanic and of sedimentary origin.

These crude phosphates cannot be used by animals directly, but must be converted into a form which can be digested by the animal. In addition, the undesired impurities must be removed or lowered to an acceptable level. The starting point of industrial feed phosphate production is technically pure (ortho-) phosphoric acid (H_{3PO}4), which is obtained from the apatite in a wet chemical process.

Example of phosphoric acid production

Wet-process phosphoric acid is prepared by adding sulfuric acid (H_{2}SO_{4}) to apatite or tricalcium phosphate rock resulting in the following reaction:

3 H_{2}SO_{4} + Ca_{3}(PO_{4})_{2} + 6 H_{2}O ⇌ 2 H_{3}PO_{4} + 3 CaSO_{4}·2H_{2}O

Wet-process acid has to be purified by removing fluorine and other undesirable elements to produce feed-grade phosphoric acid.

=== Different types of inorganic feed phosphates ===
Depending on the process and on other mineral sources used, different types of inorganic feed phosphates can be produced. The majority of the inorganic feed phosphates used in the EU and worldwide are calcium phosphates in different forms (mono-, di- and monodi-calcium phosphates) but also magnesium phosphates, sodium phosphates and even ammonium phosphates are used in animal nutrition. The end-product quality depends on the treatment and production process. Due to different chemical compositions of the different feed phosphate sources, large differences do exist in their phosphorus availability for the different animal species. However phosphate from the same source, produced by the same process, using the same raw materials, shows consistent phosphorus availability, which can be measured in biological assays.

Example of a calcium feed phosphate production

Phosphoric acid is neutralized by means of calcium oxide or calcium carbonate, or a mixture of them.

Dicalcium phosphate: H_{3}PO_{4} + CaO + H_{2}O ⇌ CaHPO_{4} + 2 H_{2}O

Monocalcium phosphate: 2H_{3}PO_{4} + CaO + H_{2}O ⇌ Ca(H_{2}PO_{4})_{2}.H_{2}O + H_{2}O

Or, based on dicalcium phosphate

Monocalcium phosphate: H_{3}PO_{4} + CaHPO_{4} +2H_{2}O ⇌ Ca(H_{2}PO_{4})_{2}.H_{2}O + H_{2}O

Depending on the used qualities the resulting products are more or less pure di- or monocalcium phosphates.

=== Quality ===
Consistent phosphorus availability relies on strict quality control during the process, to avoid degradation of orthophosphate into other unavailable phosphate forms. Impurities which are naturally occurring in the used raw materials must also be considered. But also feed hygiene and good manufacturing practices should be complied with at all stages.

== Phosphorus requirements ==
All animals require phosphorus and for most production animals these requirements are well established. Normally a number of variable factors such as performance level and breed differences are taken into account. On top of this, a safety margin is added to this to deal with variations within one flock or herd. Dietary allowances at the end take into account the availability of phosphorus within the diet and meet the requirements through supplementation with inorganic feed phosphates.

In addition calcium and vitamin D levels must be optimized because phosphorus metabolism is closely linked to these and symptoms of deficiency can be intensified if appropriate quantities are not used.

=== Preventing deficiencies ===
Because of possible phosphorus deficiencies in farmed animals, phosphorus is supplied in the form of inorganic feed phosphates. Consequences of deficiencies are known and well documented. The initial effect is a fall in blood plasma levels, followed by withdrawal of calcium and phosphorus from the skeleton. Loss of appetite and reduced productivity are common in all animal species. A poor feed conversion efficiency and a lowered live weight gain are well-known production related indicators. Other deficiencies include reduced fertility in cattle, but also reduced milk yield (milk contains on average 1 g of P per kg), stiffness and in extreme cases even enlarged joints or deformed bones and lameness. Other well known symptoms are reduced egg yield in laying birds, and, in case of chicks, reduced hatchability, together with cage layer fatigue syndrome. Also for all species osteomalacia and reduced fertility are possible. All these symptoms are more or less irreversible, resulting in economic losses for the farmer.

=== Phosphorus metabolism ===
The mechanisms of phosphorus digestion and metabolism differ substantially between ruminant and non-ruminant (monogastric) species. In pigs, most phosphorus is absorbed from the small intestine (jejunum and duodenum) in the form of orthophosphate, whose solubility is greatest. The phosphorus is then transported across the gut wall. The kidney plays the major regulatory role in controlling phosphorus levels: any excess is excreted primarily via the urine. In poultry available phosphorus solubilises in the gizzard, where it becomes available for absorption also in the duodenum and jejunum.

In the digestive system of ruminants, micro-organisms in the rumen produce enzymes which break down and thereby make available phosphorus from plant material. Phosphorus from plant sources is therefore better suited to ruminants, but is still used to a lesser extent than phosphorus provided by inorganic sources. The ruminant's phosphorus requirements are dictated by the needs of the microbial population in the rumen, with the phosphorus being necessary for cellulose digestion and protein synthesis. The main source is phosphorus recycled by the saliva, a peculiarity of ruminants. Phosphorus is mainly absorbed in the small intestine, and homeostasis is achieved by excretion of phosphorus with the faeces.

=== Phosphorus from other sources ===
The majority of the phosphorus in animal feeds originates from the vegetal feed materials to compose these feeds. However, up to 80% of the phosphorus present in vegetal feed materials is in the form of phytate. Unfortunately, and in contrast to ruminants, poultry and pigs lack the enzyme necessary to break down this phytate-phosphorus. Therefore, phosphorus digestibility of plant phosphorus varies between 6% and 50%, and it is assumed that at least two-thirds of the organic phosphorus in the diet is unavailable for pigs and poultry. That is why diets of high-producing farm animals must be supplemented with high quality inorganic feed phosphates.

== Accurate nutrition ==
These phosphate issues in animal feeding require appropriate diets. These can be provided by, amongst other things, the use of highly digestible feed materials including high quality inorganic feed phosphates.
