= Andrey Guryev =

Russian billionaire businessman

- Андрей Гурьев
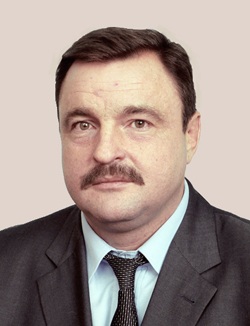
- Born: 24 March 1960 (age 66); Lobnya, Moscow Oblast, Russian SFSR, Soviet Union
- Education: Russian State University of Physical Education, Sport, Youth and Tourism
- Occupation: Businessman
- Title: Founder & CEO, PhosAgro
- Spouse: Evgenia
- Children: 2, including Andrey Guryev, Jr.
- Relatives: Alexei Motlokhov (son-in-law)

Andrey Grigoryevich Guryev (Russian: Андрей Григорьевич Гурьев; born 24 March 1960) is a Russian billionaire businessman. He is the former head of PhosAgro, one of the world's four largest producers of phosphate-based fertilizers. As of March 2022, his net worth is estimated at US$4.8 billion.

He acquired his wealth in the 1990s after the collapse of the Soviet Union, obtaining previously state-owned assets at undervalued prices. In 2004, he obtained Mikhail Khodorkovsky's half of PhosAgro at an extremely low price, as Khodorkovsky was arrested by the Vladimir Putin regime.

== Early life ==
Guryev was born in Lobnya, a town 27 kilometers (17 mi) north of Moscow. He graduated in 1983 from the Russian State University of Physical Education, Sport, Youth and Tourism, with a degree in physical education and sport. He graduated from University of Greenwich with a bachelor's degree in economics in 2003, as well as at the Russian Government Academy of National Economy, graduating in 2004, and at St. Petersburg National Mineral Resources University, where he graduated with a post-graduate certificate in Economics in 2010.

Guryev is a Judo master and from 1978 to 1987, was an instructor and committee secretary for the Mosgorsovet's Dinamo Komsomol organization.

== Career ==
In 1990, Guryev started his career working for Mikhail Khodorkovsky at the Menatep Group. He rose through the ranks and was appointed chairman of Apatit, a subsidiary of the Menatep in 2000.

In 1995, he was appointed as Head of the Mining and Chemical Products Department, First the Deputy CEO of ROSPROM and subsequently head of the Y. V. Samoilov Research Institute for Fertilizers and Insectofungicides (NIUIF).

In 2011, Guryev owned 71% of PhosAgro, with 10% owned by Vladimir Litvinenko.

In 2012, PhosAgro purchased 20% of Apatit. Guryev led a management buyout to acquire control of Apatit and PhosAgro, and now owns 100% of the company.

Between 2011 and 2013, Guryev served as a Member of the Federation Council from the executive branch of the Murmansk oblast government.

In 2013, Guryev was appointed Deputy Chairman of PhosAgro's Board of Directors. This came after he made the decision to step down as Senator, citing the new laws regarding foreign bank accounts owned by Russian entrepreneurs as his reason for stepping down after 11 years as a politician.

In 2014, Guryev sold an increased stake in PhosAgro to Vladimir Litvineko, bringing the latter's total ownership to 9.73%, up from 4.92% in 2011.

In early 2015, current CEO Andrei Guryev Jr, Andrey Guryev's son, was reported as saying, “PhosAgro is the most profitable phosphate fertilizer company in the world.”

PhosAgro is structured so that Guryev and his family are recipients of a trust, rather than outright ownership in their names, though Evgenia Guryev, Guryev's wife, owns 4.82% of PhosAgro in her own name.

In July 2016, Forbes estimated his net worth at US$4.3 billion.

He is vice president of the Russian Union of Chemists.

=== Sanctions ===
He was sanctioned by the United Kingdom and New Zealand in 2022, as well as Japan in 2023, in relation to the Russo-Ukrainian War.

Two of Guryev's superyachts have been seized due to these sanctions:

- Alfa Nero, owned through an offshore company and intended to be auctioned in Antigua and Barbuda.
- His yacht, Luminosity, was seized by Montenegro due to these sanctions.

== Personal life ==
Guryev is married to Evgenia and they have two children, Andrey Guryev, Jr. and Yulia Guryeva-Motlokhov. Andrey Guryev, Jr, is CEO of PhosAgro. Yulia Guryeva-Motlokhov is married to hedge fund manager Alexei Motlokhov, they have twin sons, and live next door in Highgate.

The Guryevs own Witanhurst in Highgate, London's second largest house after Buckingham Palace, through an offshore company registered in the British Virgin Islands. He owns the five-storey penthouse of St George Wharf Tower in London. Guryev has never given an interview to the press.
