= Vladimir Litvinenko =

Russian academic and businessman linked to Putin

- Владимир Литвиненко
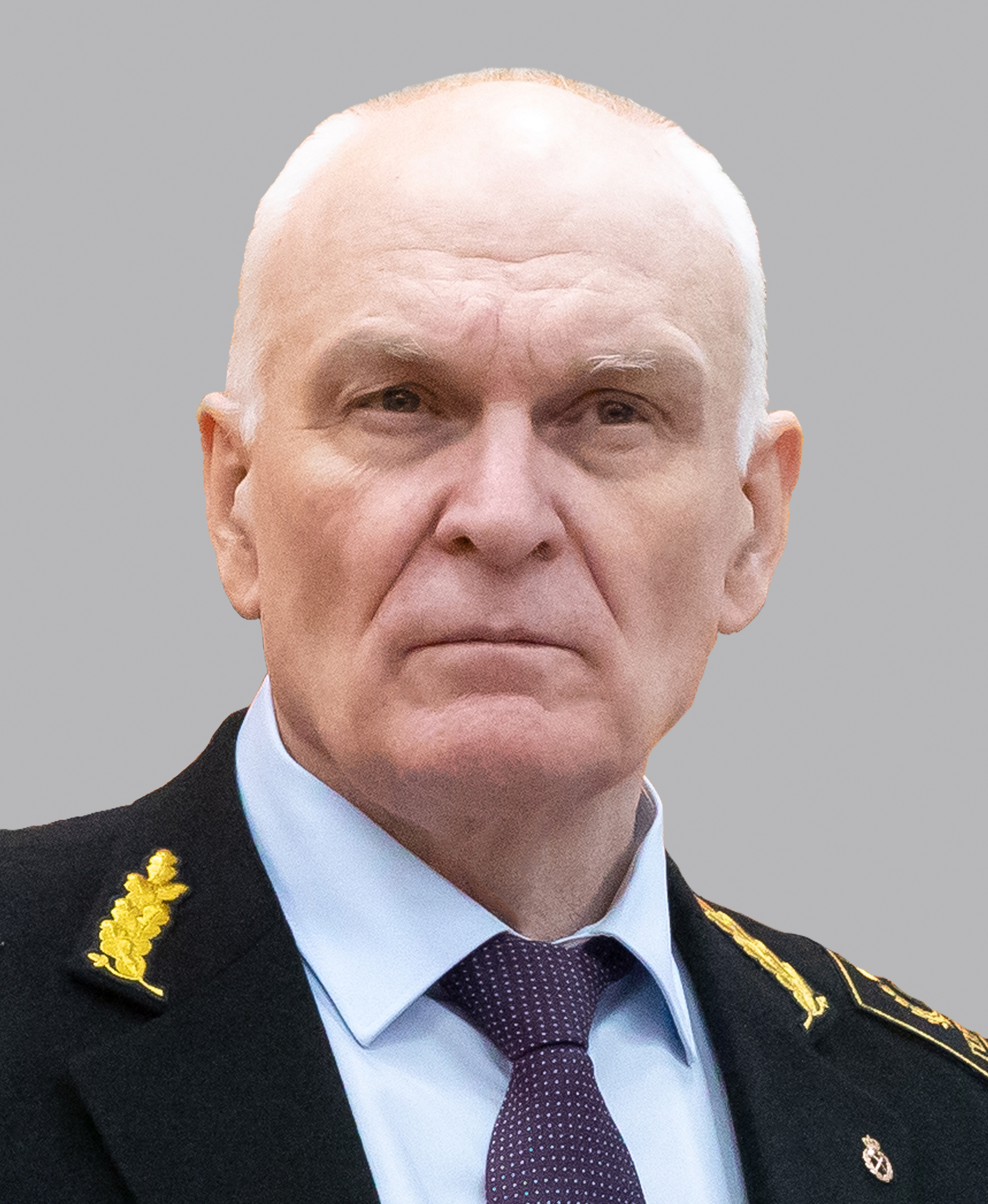
- Litvinenko in 2022
- Born: 14 August 1955 (age 71); Novoleninsky, Timashyovsky District, Krasnodar Krai, Russian SFSR, Soviet Union
- Education: Leningrad Mining Institute
- Occupation: Rector
- Children: Olga Litvinenko

Vladimir Stefanovich Litvinenko (Russian: Владимир Стефанович Литвиненко, born 14 August 1955) is a Russian academic, businessman and Vladimir Putin's campaign manager. He is also rector of Saint Petersburg Mining University in St. Petersburg.

== Career ==
Litvinenko has been the rector of Saint Petersburg Mining University since the 1990s.

He oversaw Vladimir Putin's dissertation work in 1996, which is alleged to include significant amounts of plagiarism and is speculated perhaps to have not even been written by Putin. Litvinenko has been criticised for either not spotting the alleged plagiarism or blatantly ignoring it. According to his daughter Olga, Vladimir Litvinenko himself wrote the dissertation.

Litvinenko was Putin's political campaign manager in 2000 and 2004.

On June 11, 2014, he was given an honorary doctorate by the Freiberg University of Mining and Technology, Saxony, Germany.

In 2022, he signed the Address of the Russian Union of Rectors, which called to support Putin in his invasion of Ukraine.

== Business career ==
Litvinenko owns nearly 15% of PhosAgro, a phosphate mining company in the Arctic. The mine had been at one time partly owned by Mikhail Khodorkovsky. He claims that he was paid in shares for some consulting that he did in 2004 and that this "did not contradict any laws".

Phosagro was floated on the London Stock Exchange in July 2011 and Litvinenko was listed among its new owners, as chairman. When Litvinenko owned 5%, the stock was worth about $260 million. In April 2014, he acquired a further 4.9% from Andrey Guryev, who controls the company, for $269 million.

== Personal life ==
Litvinenko is married to Tatyana Petrovna Klovanich. Litvinenko has a daughter, Olga, born in 1983, who used to be a member of the Legislative Assembly of Saint Petersburg. In May 2010 Vladimir and his wife Tatyana were looking after Olga's daughter Ester-Maria Litvinenko (born in 2009), and refused to give her back to Olga. Olga has described this as a kidnapping and has instigated legal proceedings to get her daughter back. Olga describes her father as "the richest rector in Russia" and an "oligarch" ("самый богатый ректор России, олигарх"). When Olga fled the country in summer 2011, Vladimir reported to the police that Olga and her other son, Michael Stefan, had been kidnapped and his daughter's assets were frozen. According to Olga, all lawyers defending her were arrested and sentenced.
