= PhosAgro =

Russian chemical company

JSC PhosAgro
- Native name: ОАО «ФосАгро»
- Company type: Public (OAO)
- Traded as: MCX: PHOR; LSE: PHOR
- Industry: Chemical
- Founded: 2003
- Headquarters: Moscow, Russia
- Key people: Xavier R. Rolet KBE,(Chairman); Andrey A. Guryev, (CEO)
- Products: Fertilizer
- Revenue: $5.71 billion (2021)
- Operating income: $2.23 billion (2021)
- Net income: $1.76 billion (2021)
- Total assets: $5.51 billion (2021)
- Total equity: $2.24 billion (2021)
- Number of employees: 5,001
- Website: www.phosagro.com

PhosAgro is a Russian chemical holding company producing fertilizer, phosphates and feed phosphates. The company is based in Moscow, Russia, and its subsidiaries include Apatit, a company based in the Murmansk Region and engaged in the extraction of apatite rock. The company is Europe's largest producer of phosphate-based fertilisers.

== Ownership history ==
The original owner of PhosAgro's assets (most notably Apatit, a Soviet-era mining company) was exiled Russian billionaire Mikhail Khodorkovsky via his company, Menatep. In 2003, Khodorkovsky was arrested for tax evasion and fraud; the charges against him were ostensibly connected to Menatep's purchase of shares in Apatit. However, some have seen the charges as punishment for publicly clashing with Vladimir Putin.

During Khordorkovsky's trial, the state seized Menatep's stake in Apatit. In 2004, Andrey Guryev, who at the time ran Apatit on behalf of Khodorkovsky's Menatep and was also a Russian senator, wrote a message to Khodorkovsky in prison to convince him to sell his remaining 50% stake in PhosAgro to Guryev. Khodorkovsky sold his shares to Guryev for a low price.

In July 2011, PhosAgro raised $538 million in a London IPO.

In 2012, PhosAgro paid $344 million at a state tender to buy back a 26.7% share in Apatit, bringing the company's ownership to 76%.

As of 2012, Andrey Guryev and his family owned 5.47% of PhosAgro via various trusts.

PhosAgro is 19.35% owned by Vladimir Litvinenko, who oversaw Vladimir Putin's plagiarized doctoral thesis in 1996.

In 2022, the company's revenue amounted to 164 billion rubles.

== Subsidiaries ==
- Apatit
- Ammophos
- Cherepovetsky Azot
- BMU (Balakovskyie Mineralnyie Udobrenia)
- PhosAgro-Trans it is planned to rename all these companies to the names of the owners

== United Kingdom controversy ==
In June 2017, Igor Sychev, a former head of PhosAgro's tax department, presented a claim against PhosAgro to the High Court of Justice in London. In his claim, he demanded 1% of the company's shares or their value in cash (approximately $55 million, and also $8 million in cash to serve as his remuneration for having previously defended PhosAgro interests in court.

According to Sychev's statement, the conflict started after he didn't receive the agreed remuneration for defending PhosAgro's interests in court.

The defendants in the London court case are Andrey Guryev, PhosAgro's Vice President of the Board of Directors, and another board member, Igor Antoshin, along with several offshore companies based in the Seychelles and Belize. A London judge has permitted the opening of proceedings against the defendants.

In October 2019, another lawsuit was launched against PhosAgro in the London High Court. Alexander Gorbachev, a Russian businessman and former senior executive at PhosAgro, is suing the company for what he alleges is his rightful share of the business—a stake worth £1 billion at today's market value. The full trial was expected to be heard in the High Court in 2020 or 2021.
