= Chernihiv–Ovruch railway =

Railway line in Ukraine and Belarus

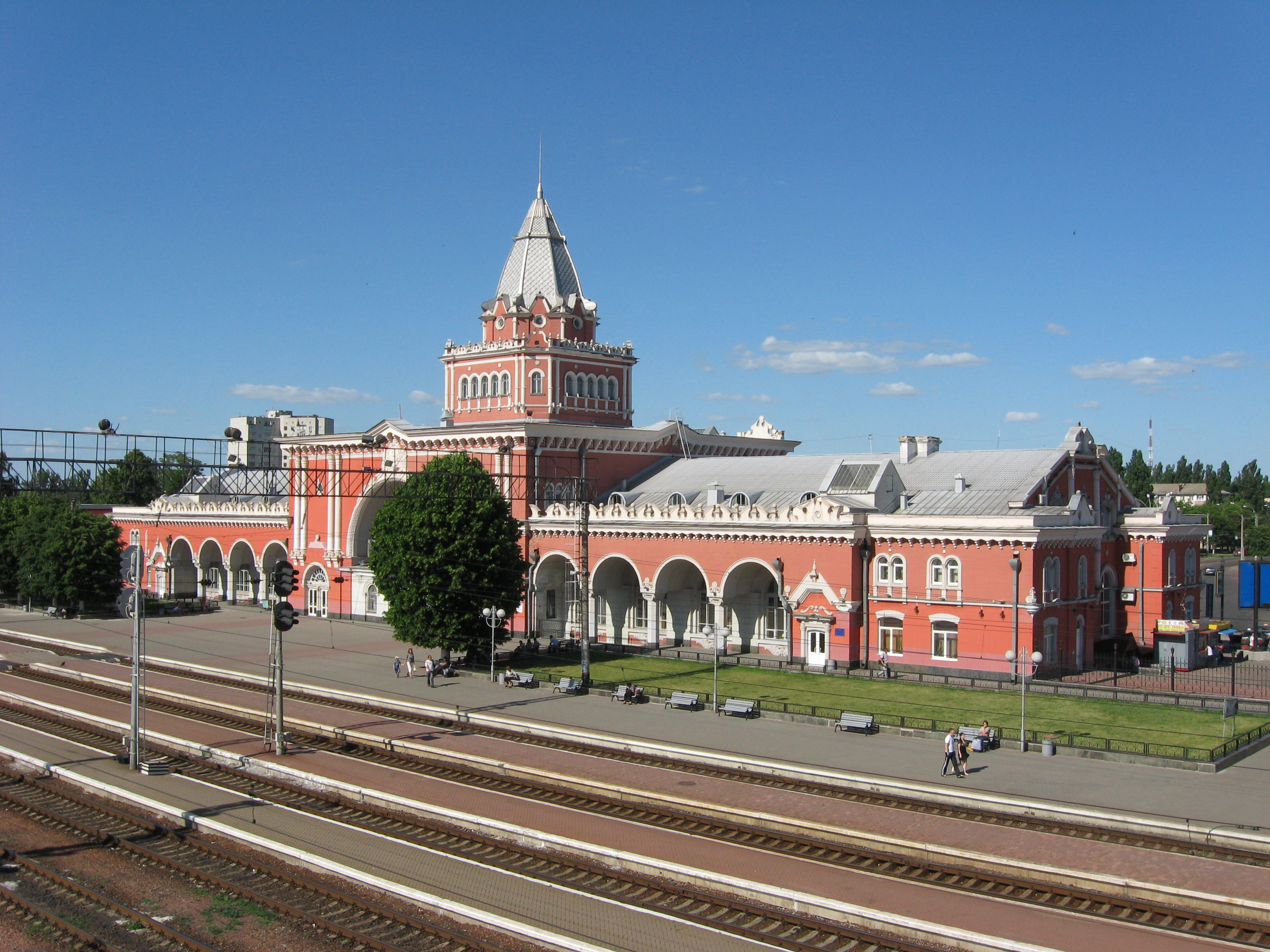
- Chernihiv station building and platforms

Overview
- Native name: Ukrainian: Дільниця Чернігів–Овруч; Russian: Участок Чернигов–Овруч; Belarusian: Ўчастак Чарнігаў–Оўруч
- Status: Partially active (84.4 km)
- Owner: Ukrainian Railways (UZ)
- Locale: Ukraine, Belarus
- Termini: Chernihiv, Ukraine; Ovruch, Ukraine

Service
- Type: Commuter rail
- Operator(s): Southwestern Railways (PZZ)

History
- Opened: 1930

Technical
- Line length: 177.5 km (110.3 mi)
- Track gauge: 1,520 mm (4 ft 11 27/32 in) (Russian)
- Electrification: 25 kV 50 Hz AC (84,4 km)

The Chernihiv–Ovruch railway is a partially electrified and partially operational single track railway line that stretches between the town of Ovruch and the city of Chernihiv, in northern Ukraine, passing through southern Belarus and the Chernobyl Exclusion Zone. The line is owned by Ukrzaliznytsia alone, with railway stations located in Belarus being leased from the government of Belarus. A portion of the line between railway stations Vilcha and Semykhody has not been in service since the Chernobyl disaster, on 26 April 1986.

== History ==
The line's construction started in 1928, as part of a modernization and development program of Southwestern Railways (Ukrainian: Південно-Західна залізниця). It was opened for passenger traffic in 1930. Partially abandoned after the Chernobyl disaster of 1986, it works in its eastern section, between Chernihiv and Semikhody, a terminus station near Pripyat serving the Chernobyl Nuclear Power Plant. This line section was electrified in 1988.

== Route ==
=== Chernihiv-Slavutych-Pripyat ===
The line begins at the central station of Chernihiv, capital of the Chernihiv Oblast, located on the Minsk-Gomel-Kyiv line. After two minor stops within the city, it passes through a few small villages in Chernihiv Raion. At Zhukotky station began a now closed branch to Karkhivka and Zhydinychi. 36 km (22 mi) after Chernihiv the line reaches Slavutych, a city built in 1986 for the refugees fleeing the Chernobyl disaster. Its station replaced the pre-existing "Nerafa", demolished to build a larger station for the new city.

After the stops in Lisnyi (in Slavutych) and Nedanchychi (in Chernihiv Raion) the line enters Belarus' Oblast of Gomel, passing over the Dnieper river. The station of Iolcha is the only functioning stop working on the Belarusian part of the line. It serves the villages of Staraya Iolcha, Novaya Iolcha, Krasnoe, and the near town of Kamaryn, all in Brahin Raion. After Iolcha, the line enters in the Polesie State Radioecological Reserve, created to enclose the territory of Belarus most affected by radioactive fallout from the Chernobyl accident, through three abandoned stations. The first one, Kaporenka, was the interchange point (in Russian: Пересадочная, "Peresadochnaya") of an abandoned siding to a decontamination park.

The line then reenters Ukraine, joining Vyshhorod Raion, in Kyiv Oblast, and the Exclusion Zone. After Zymovyshche it passes over the Pripyat River and past a branch to the new Semikhody terminal station. Built in 1988, the Semikhody station is a terminus that substitutes Semykhody stop, on the main line, and is the endpoint of the electrification and passenger service. Located in front of the nuclear plant, close to the New Safe Confinement, the terminus serves workers and is the only working station in Pripyat.

Continuing on the main line, it passes the first industrial siding for the Chernobyl Plant and, after the so-called Bridge of Death, a second siding, just before Yaniv, the main station of Pripyat. The industrial line, which runs a loop around the nuclear plant passing between the 4 reactors and next to the cooling pond, is partially active because it allows goods and materials to be moved around the plant.

=== Pripyat-Vilcha-Ovruch ===
Yaniv station, located between Yaniv village and the southern suburb of Pripyat, was an important passenger hub before the nuclear accident. It is the nearest station to Chernobyl town, 18 km (11 mi) south, and nowadays is a railroad graveyard, with a high number of abandoned trains, making it one of the tourist sights in Pripyat. The station, refurbished in the 2010s, is used by workers of the society "Chornobylservis" (Ukrainian: Чорнобильсервіс) for fixing heavy machinery.

After leaving Pripyat, the line continues through a forested area, highly contaminated at several points. It is rarely used by freight trains serving the nuclear plant and passes several villages, such as Buriakivka, known for its large vehicle graveyard full of abandoned radioactive machinery. After Tovstyi Lis the line runs along the border between the "10-km" and "30-km" zones and enters Vyshhorod Raion. It passes through the ghost town of Vilcha, 17 km (11 mi) north of Poliske, today one of the checkpoints to the Exclusion Zone. This section of the line is the most decrepit, with the track invaded by vegetation and the station buildings mostly in ruins.

Leaving Vilcha, the line enters Narodychi Raion of the Zhytomyr Oblast and after Radcha, the line reaches Ovruch Raion. It crosses several villages and ends at Ovruch station, on the line linking Mazyr to Korosten. The Vilcha-Ovruch section, de jure operating but de facto abandoned, has had no passenger services since 1986. Vilcha station was open until 2013.

== Train services ==
Until 1986, the entire line was served by regional and long-distance trains such as the Moscow-Khmelnytskyi express service. Current passenger services include the following trains:

Category	Route (RT)	Notes
Regional	Chernihiv-Slavutych-Iolcha	With not all stations served, the Nedanchychi-Iolcha service, passing the Belarusian border, is limited.
Regional	Slavutych-Semikhody	Non-stop train, for Chernobyl Plant workers

== In popular culture ==
Ovruch station was mentioned in the 1963 book The Truce (Italian: La tregua), by the Italian writer Primo Levi. It was a stop on his roundabout 1945 trip from the Auschwitz concentration camp to his home in Turin.

Yaniv station appears as an accessible location in the 2009 video game S.T.A.L.K.E.R.: Call of Pripyat.

== Gallery ==
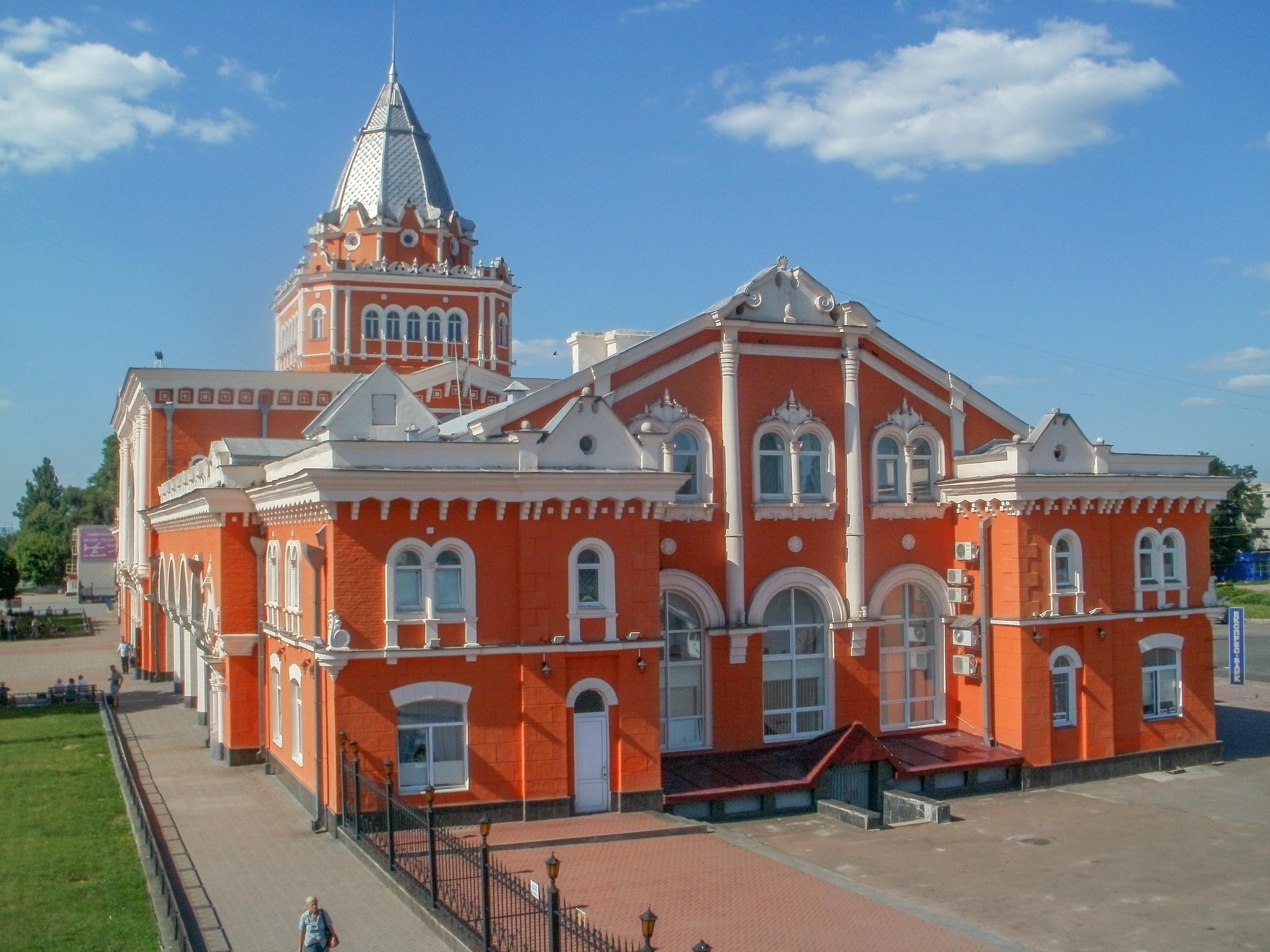
Chernihiv station building

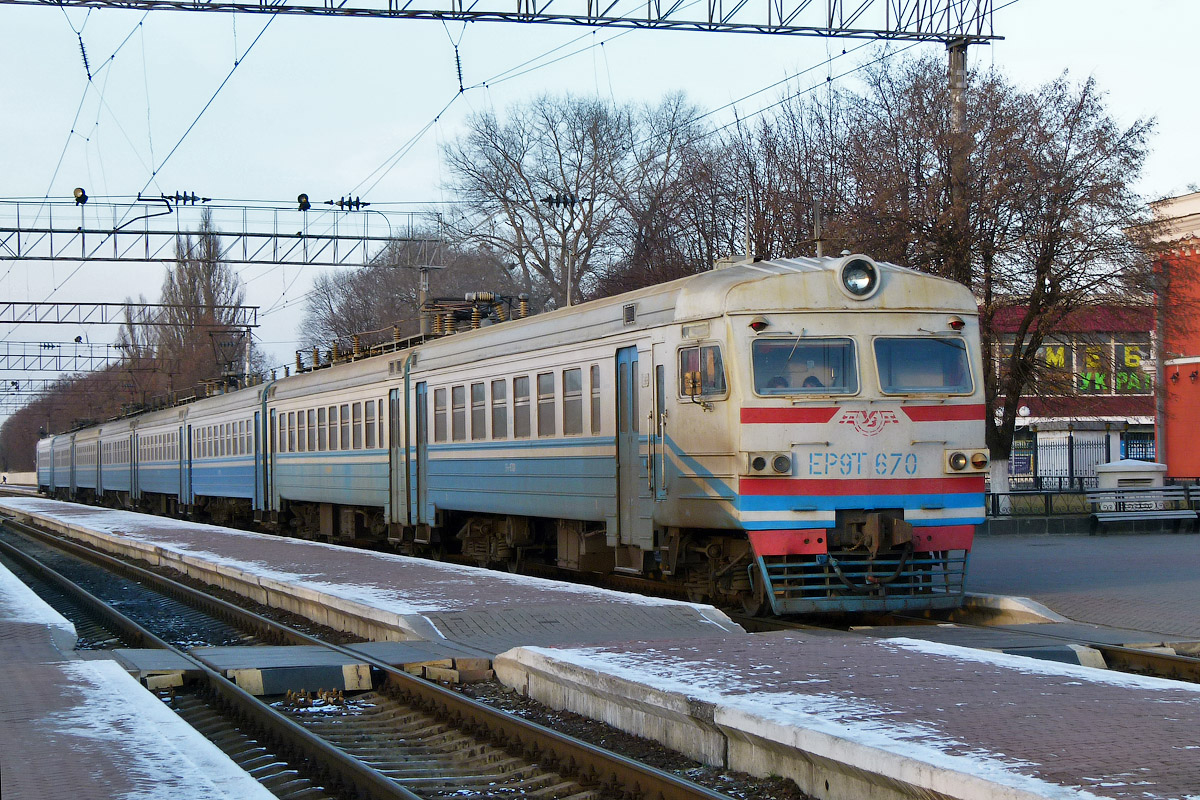
An ER9T, used on the line, at Chernihiv

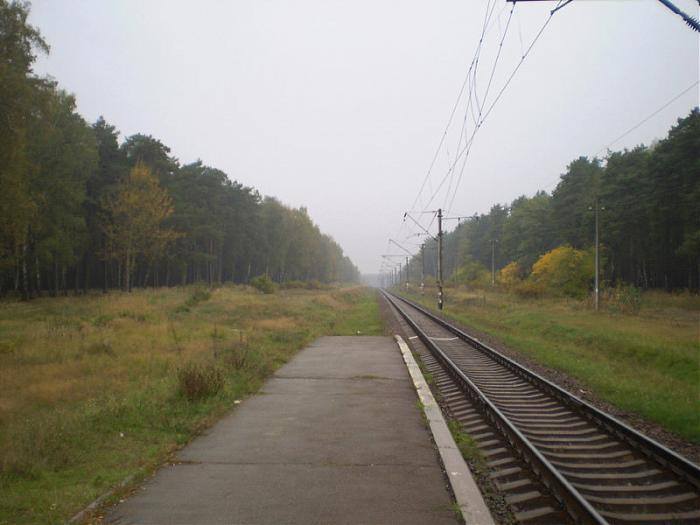
Chernihiv Pidusivka station
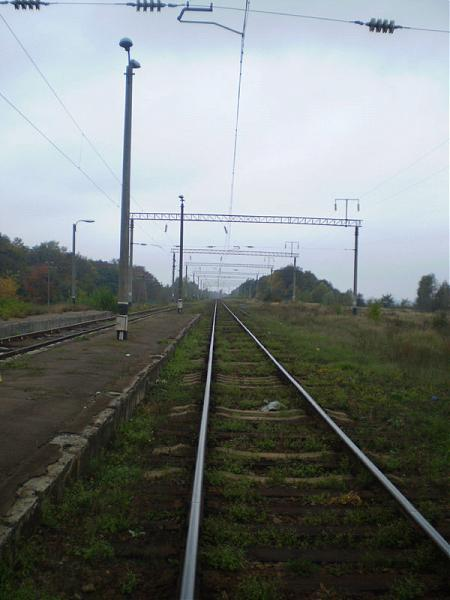
Maliyky station

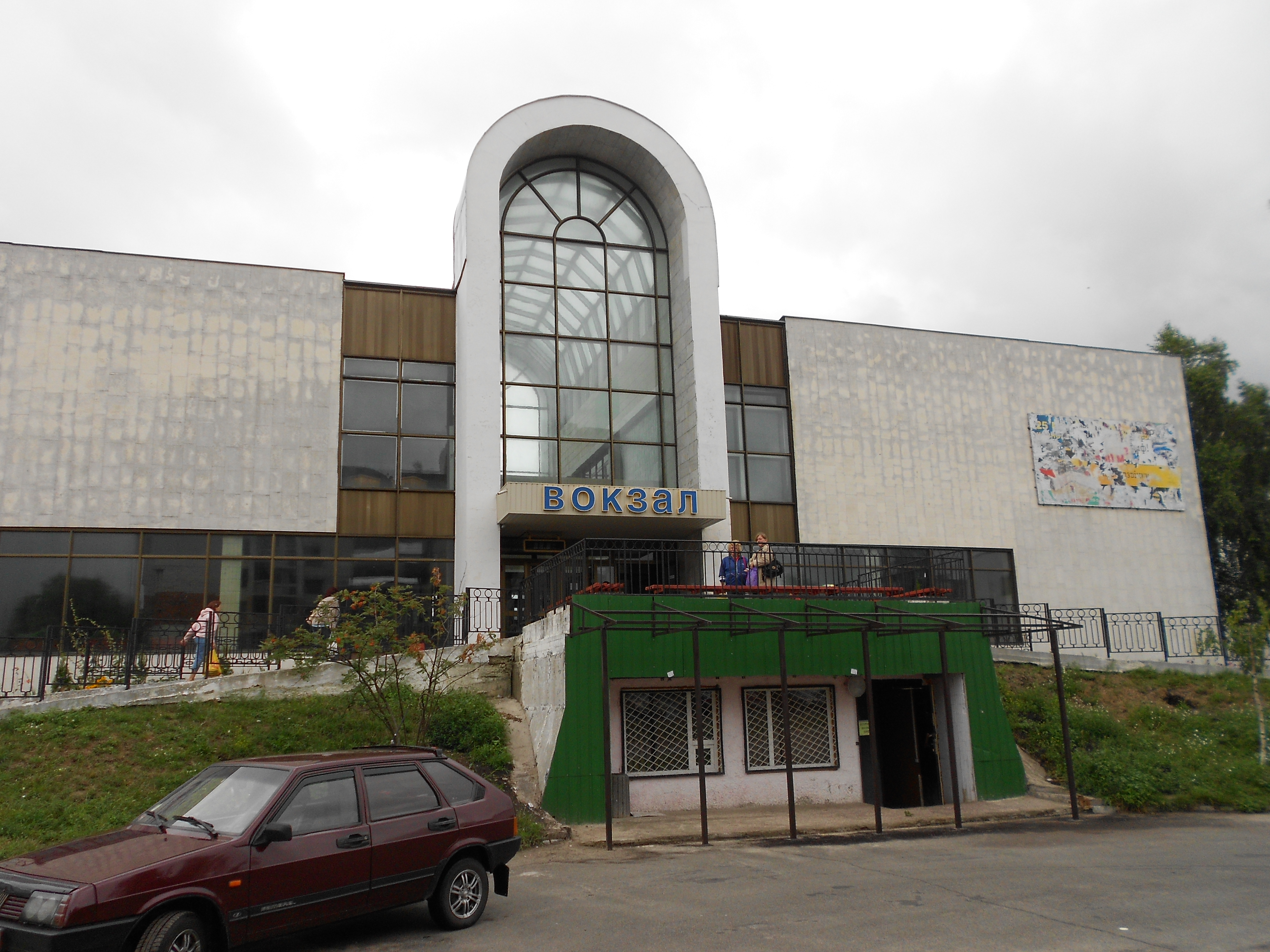
Slavutych station building

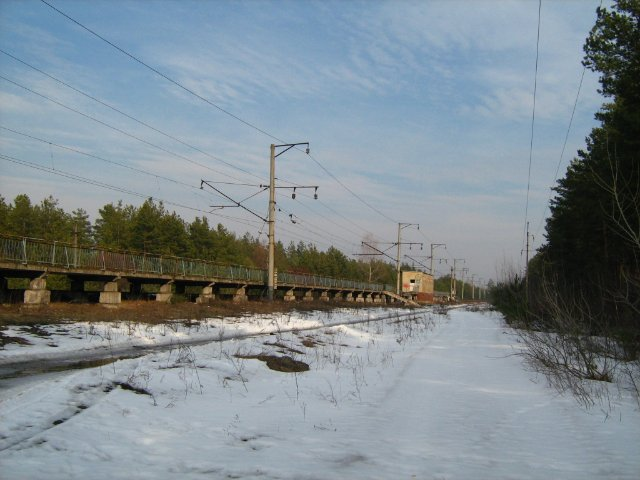
Poselok Lesnoi station, near Slavutych
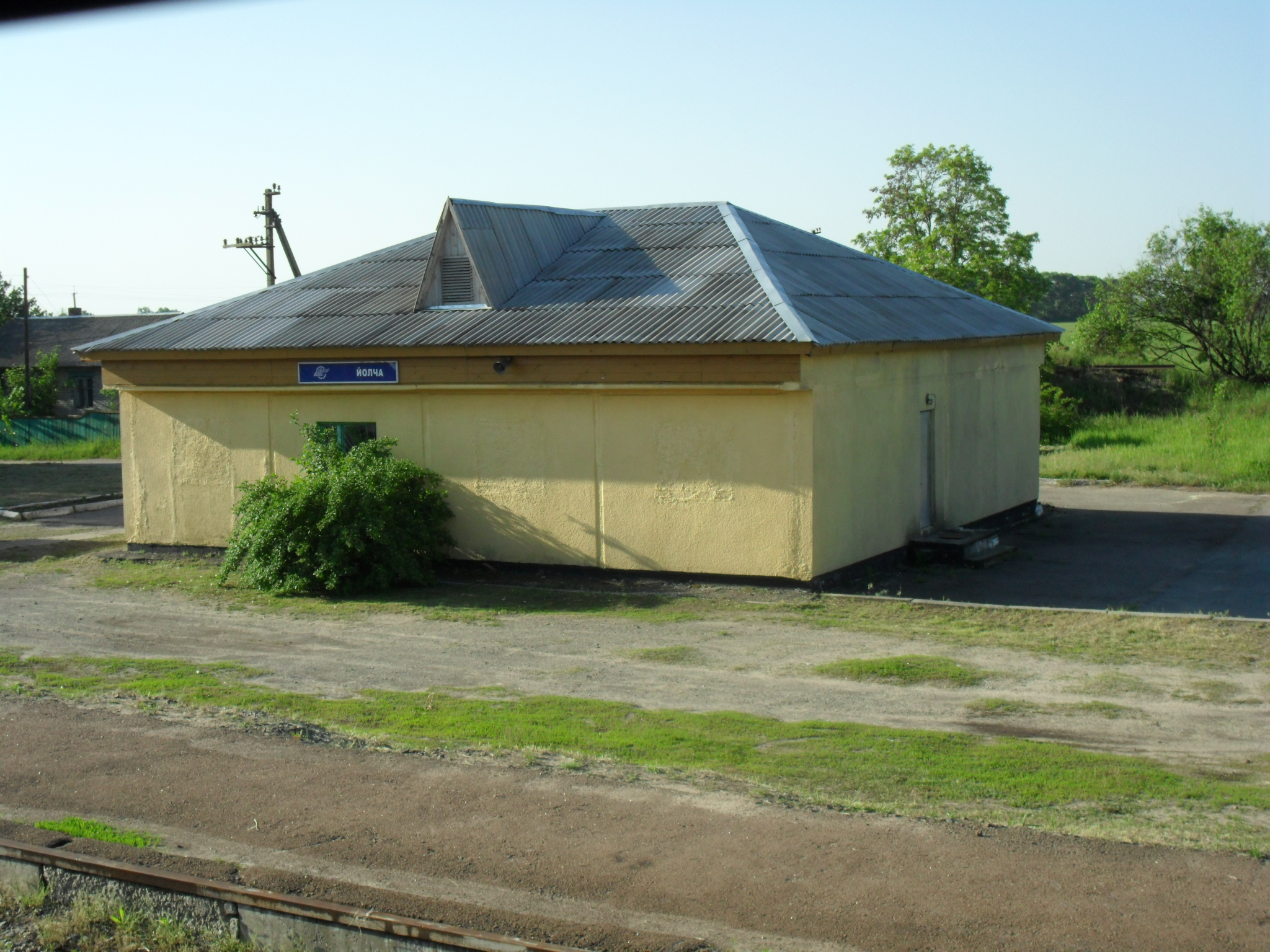
Iolcha station building

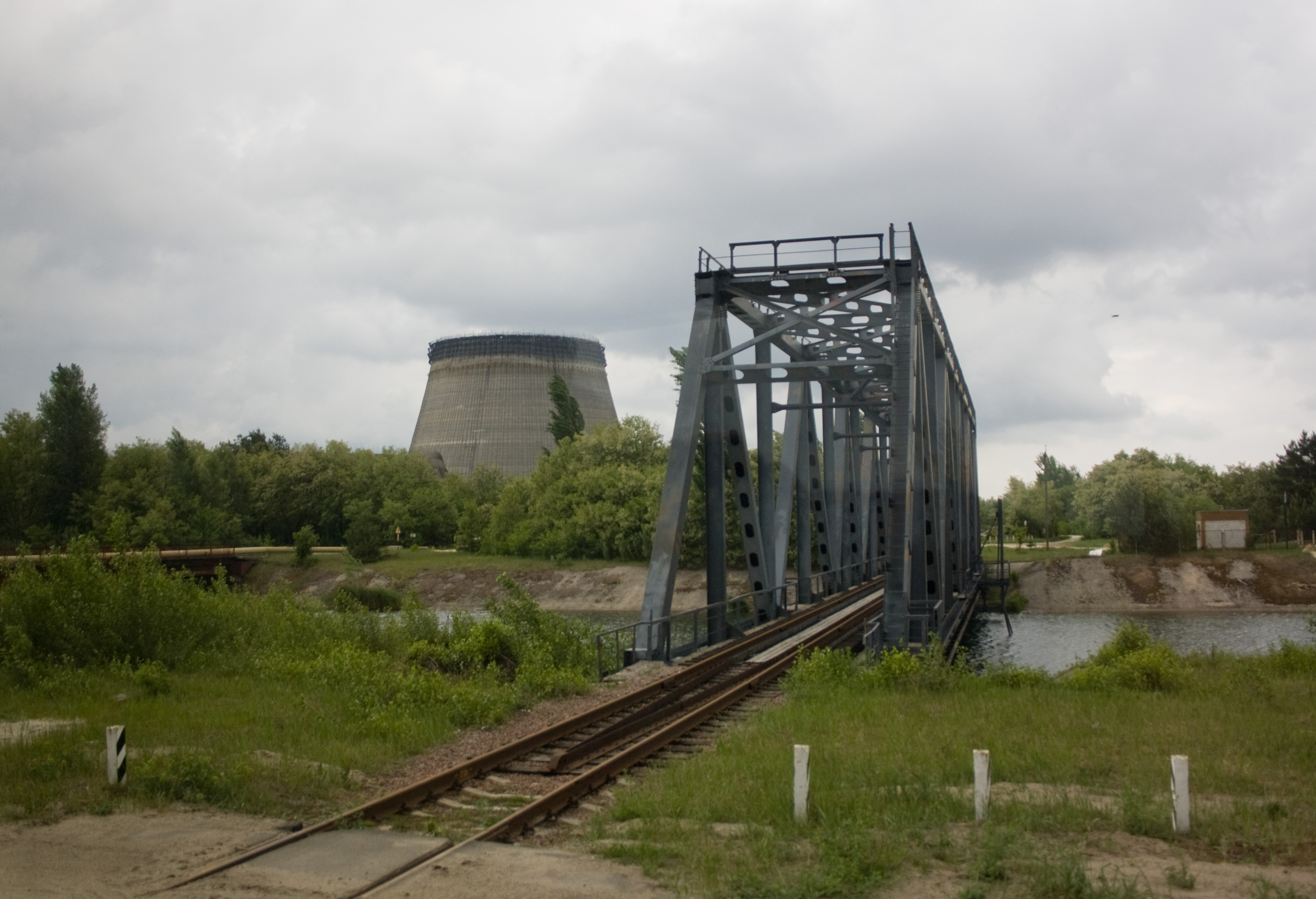
Rail bridge in Chernobyl Plant, part of the industrial branch from Yaniv station

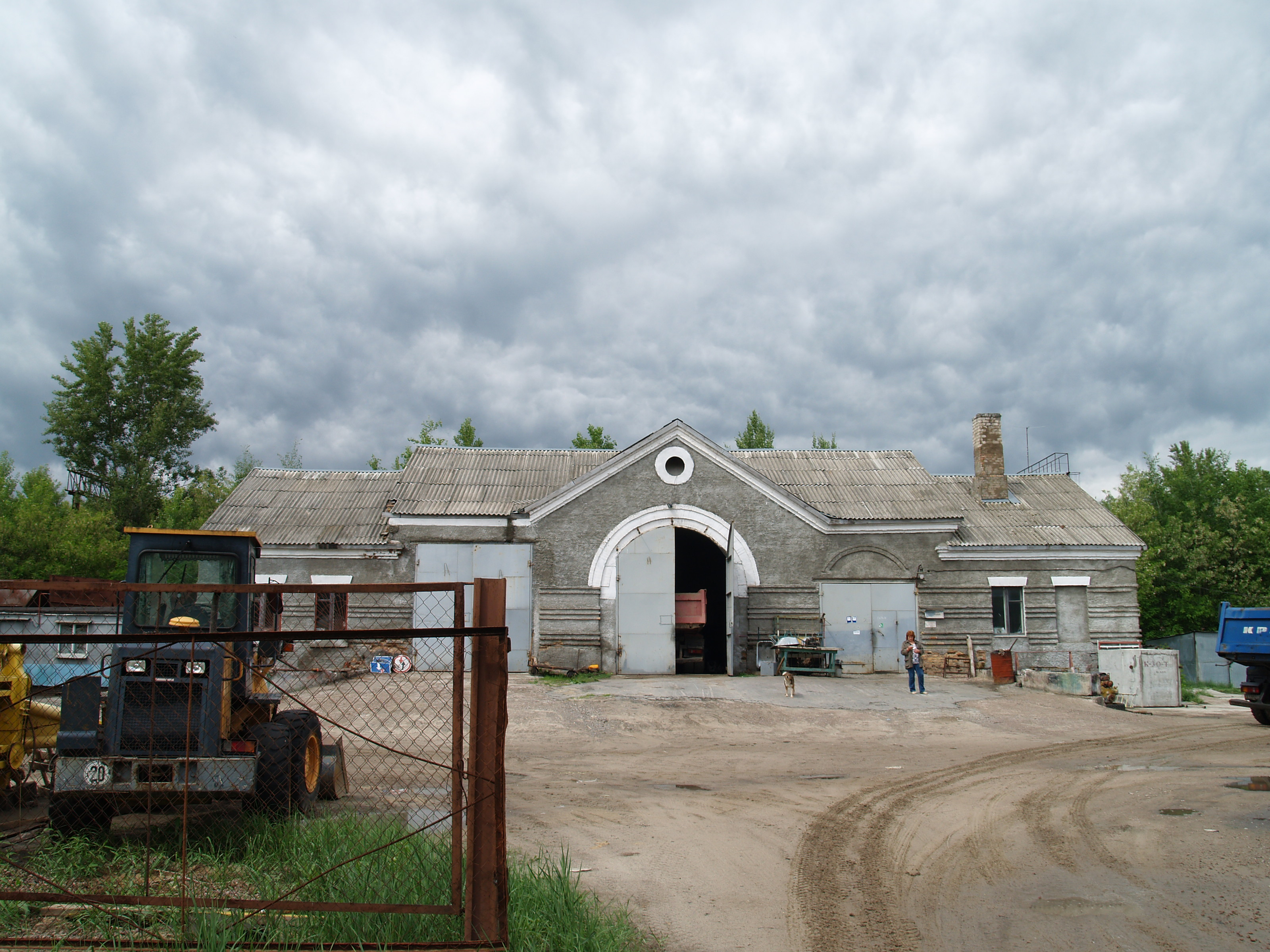
Yaniv station building at Pripyat
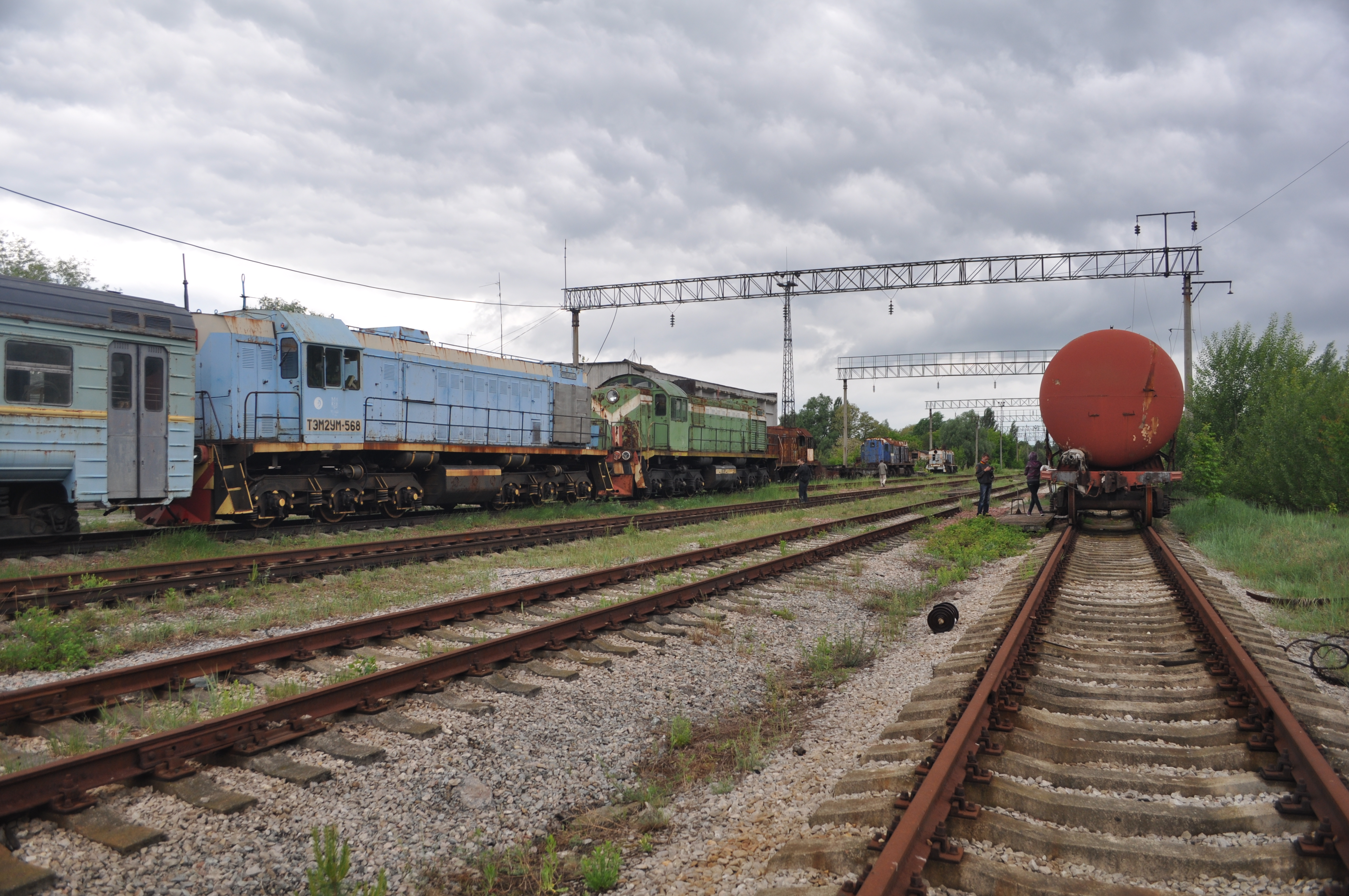
Abandoned trains at Yaniv station

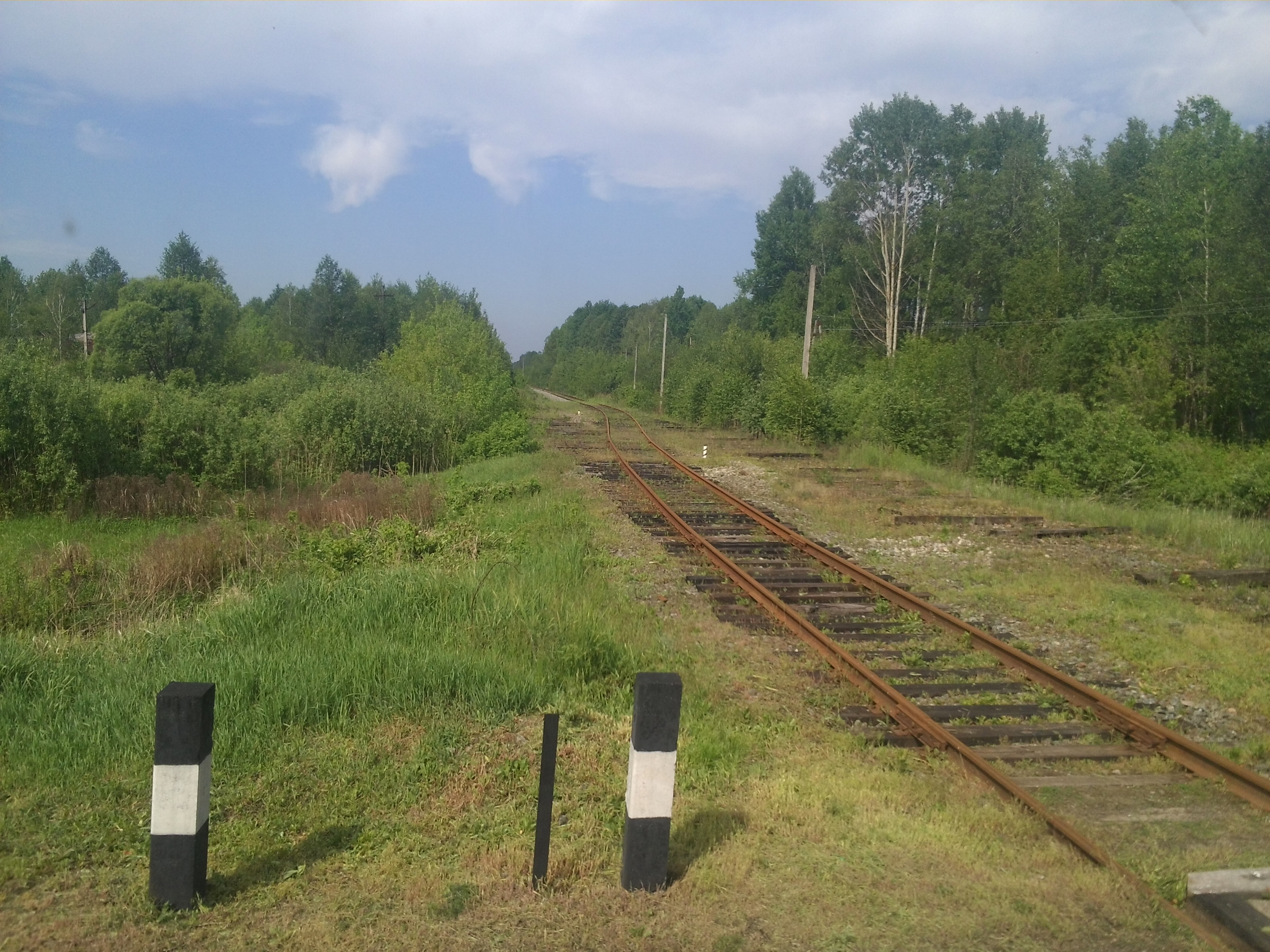
A rail track nearby Vilcha station

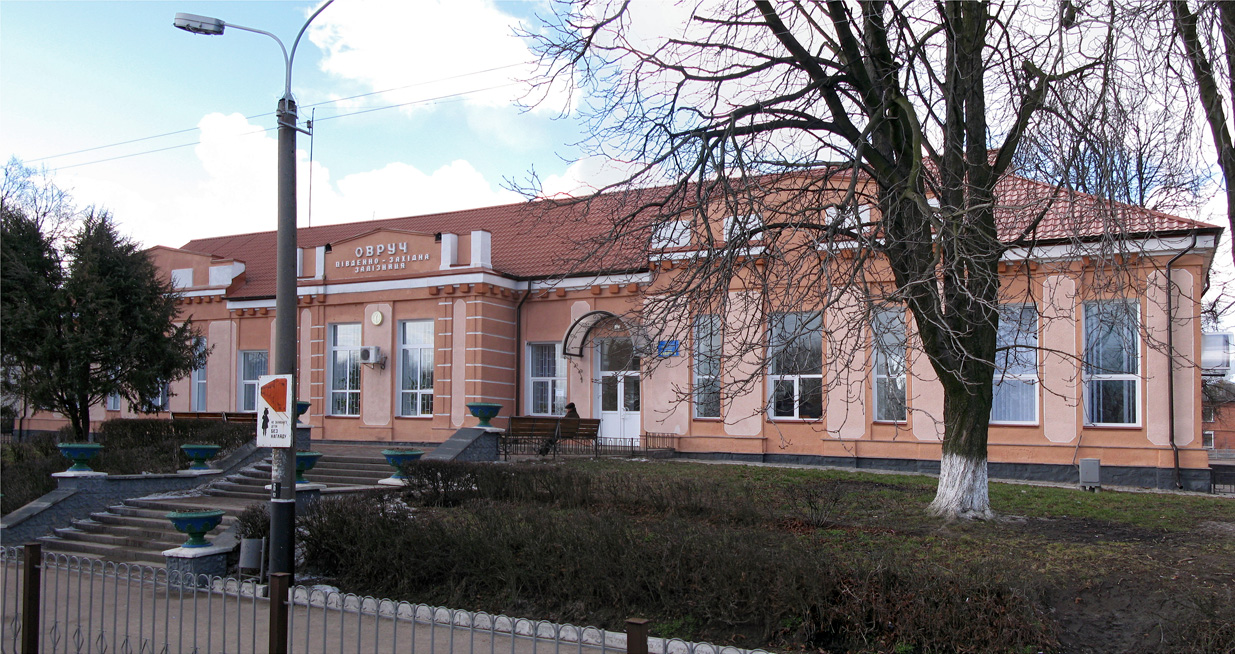
Ovruch station building

== See also ==
- Yaniv railway station
- Rail transport in Ukraine
