= Vilcha railway station =

Railway station in Vilcha, Ukraine

Vilcha Ukrainian: Вільча, Russian: Вильча
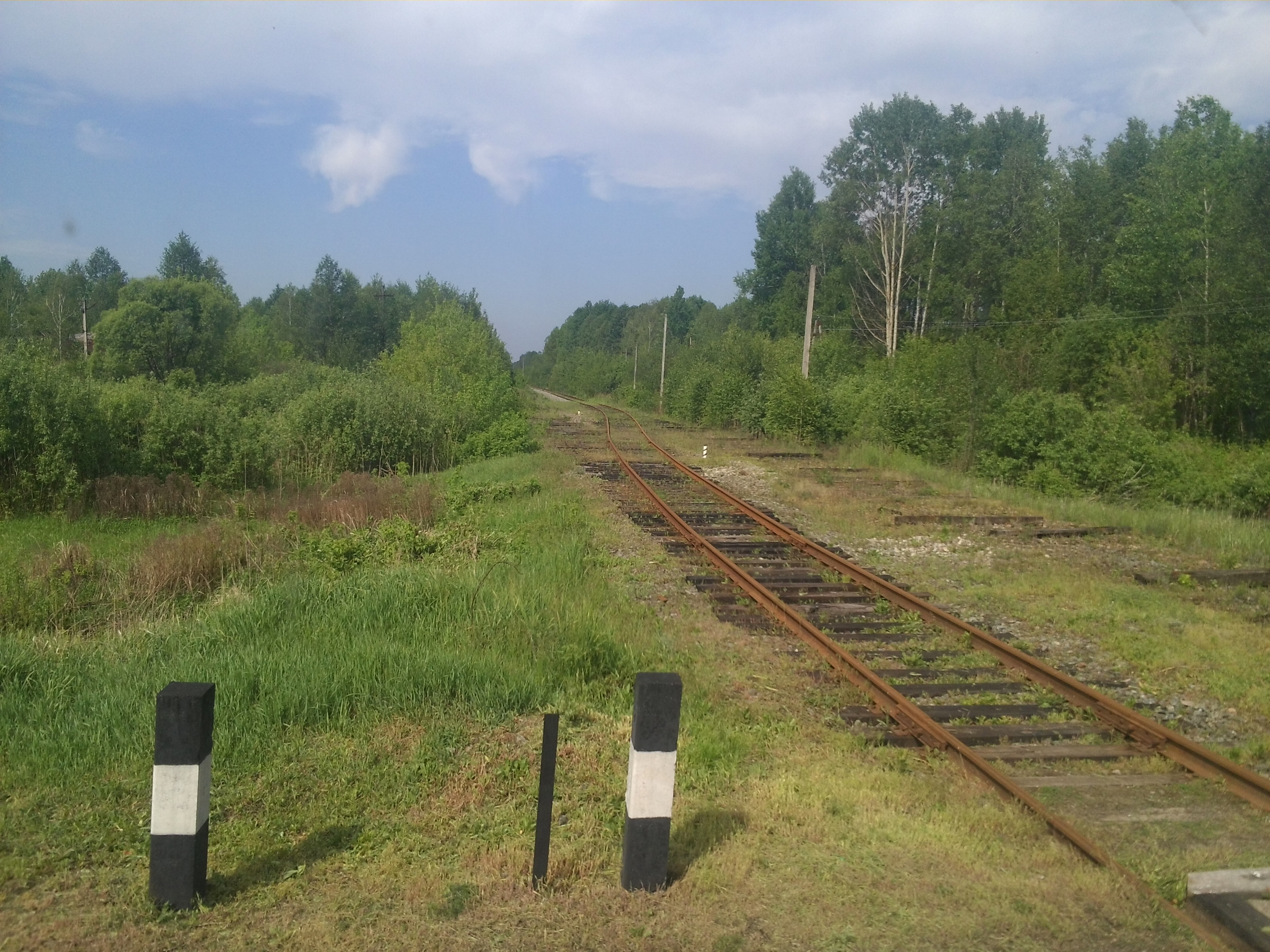
- A railway track near the station.

General information
- Location: Vilcha; Ukraine
- Coordinates: 51.361551°N 29.438043°E
- Line: Chernihiv–Ovruch
- Platforms: 1
- Tracks: 2

Other information
- Station code: 347005

History
- Opened: 1928
- Closed: 27 April 1986 (emergency)
- Rebuilt: 2021
Location

Vilcha railway station (Ukrainian: Вільча, Russian: Вильча), previously Oleksiivka, is a station in Vilcha, Kyiv Oblast, not too far from Pripyat. It is part of the Chernihiv–Ovruch railway, and is included in the transport sector state-owned enterprise Chernobylservis. As of 2022, it is officially active, but there is no passenger service.

== History ==
The station was commissioned in 1928 as part of the Chernihiv-Ovruch railway, with the name Oleksiivka.

In 2017, the Ukrainian government decided to extend the Vilcha-Semykhody section of the Chernihiv-Ovruch railway from the previously dismantled Semykhody railway station to Vilcha for easier access to the Chornobyl New Safe Confinement of the Chornobyl Nuclear Power Plant. The job was given to Energoatom. One of the rail tracks passing through Yaniv was reconstructed, and construction began with two teams beginning at Vilcha and Yaniv station. On July 9, 2021, the two teams met and placed the "golden spike".

== Structure ==
There is one platform in the middle of the station and two tracks. The station building is currently inactive but still exists.
