= Jupiter (factory) =

Abandoned factory in the Chernobyl Exclusion Zone, Ukraine

Coordinates: 51.402822°N 30.043381°E

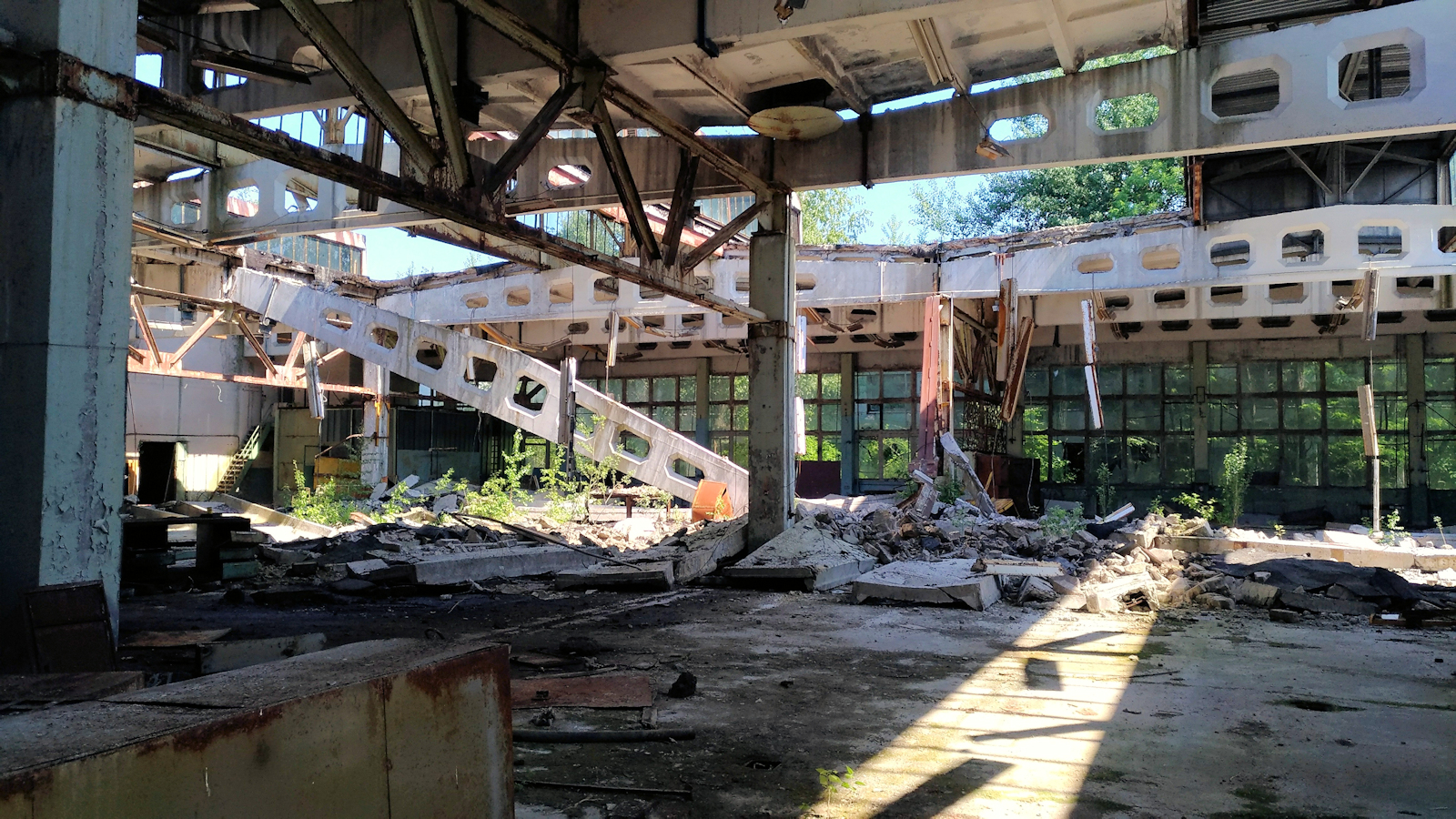
- The factory interior in June 2019
- Industry: Military
- Founded: 1980
- Defunct: 1996
- Headquarters: Pripyat, Kyiv Oblast, Ukraine

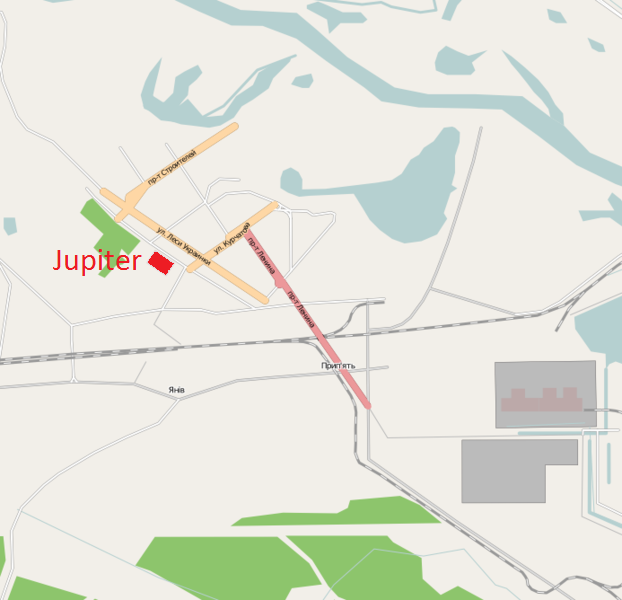
OSM locator map of the Jupiter Factory within the city of Pripyat

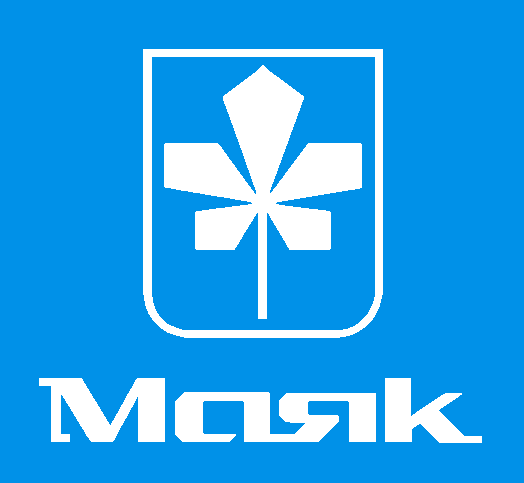
The Kyiv's "Mayak" logo

The Jupiter Factory (Ukrainian: завод Юпітер; Russian: завод Юпитер, zavod Yupiter) is an abandoned factory located on the outskirts of Pripyat, in the Chernobyl Exclusion Zone in northern Ukraine. Officially a manufacturer of cassette recorders and components for home appliances, the factory secretly produced semiconductor components for the military, and had test workshops for robotic systems.

== History ==
As many university-educated people lived in Pripyat, the Soviet Union decided to build a factory in the outskirts to employ some of those people. This factory became the second employer in the area after the Chernobyl Nuclear Power Plant. The factory opened in 1980 and employed around 3,500 people. Officially, Jupiter was built as a branch of the Kyiv factory, Mayak (Lighthouse), where they made cassette recorders and electronic components for home appliances.

But the reality was somewhat different. Production of tape and components for appliances was a smokescreen for Jupiter's secret production of semiconductor components for the military industry. New materials were tested in laboratories and workshops and the robotics department developed various robotic systems.

Some time after the Chernobyl disaster in 1986 caused the abandonment of Pripyat, some employees returned to Jupiter and the factory became a radiological laboratory for testing of various decontamination techniques and developing dosimetric instruments. The factory continued operations until 1996; today it is abandoned. The level of radioactive contamination in some places remains several times higher than the safe level, especially in the basement.

== Cultural references ==
- The Jupiter Factory appears prominently in S.T.A.L.K.E.R.: Call of Pripyat as the location of one of the Mi-24 crash sites the protagonist, SBU Major Alexander Degtyarev, is sent in to locate and investigate in the aftermath of a failed military operation.
- The Jupiter Factory appears in the music video of the song "Marooned" by Pink Floyd.

== Gallery ==
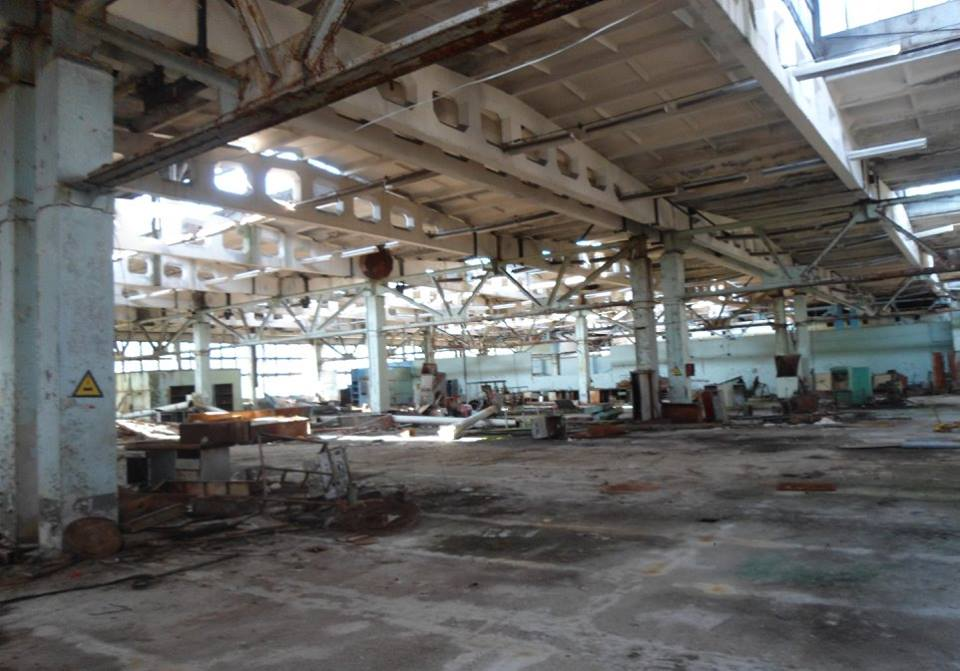
August 2016

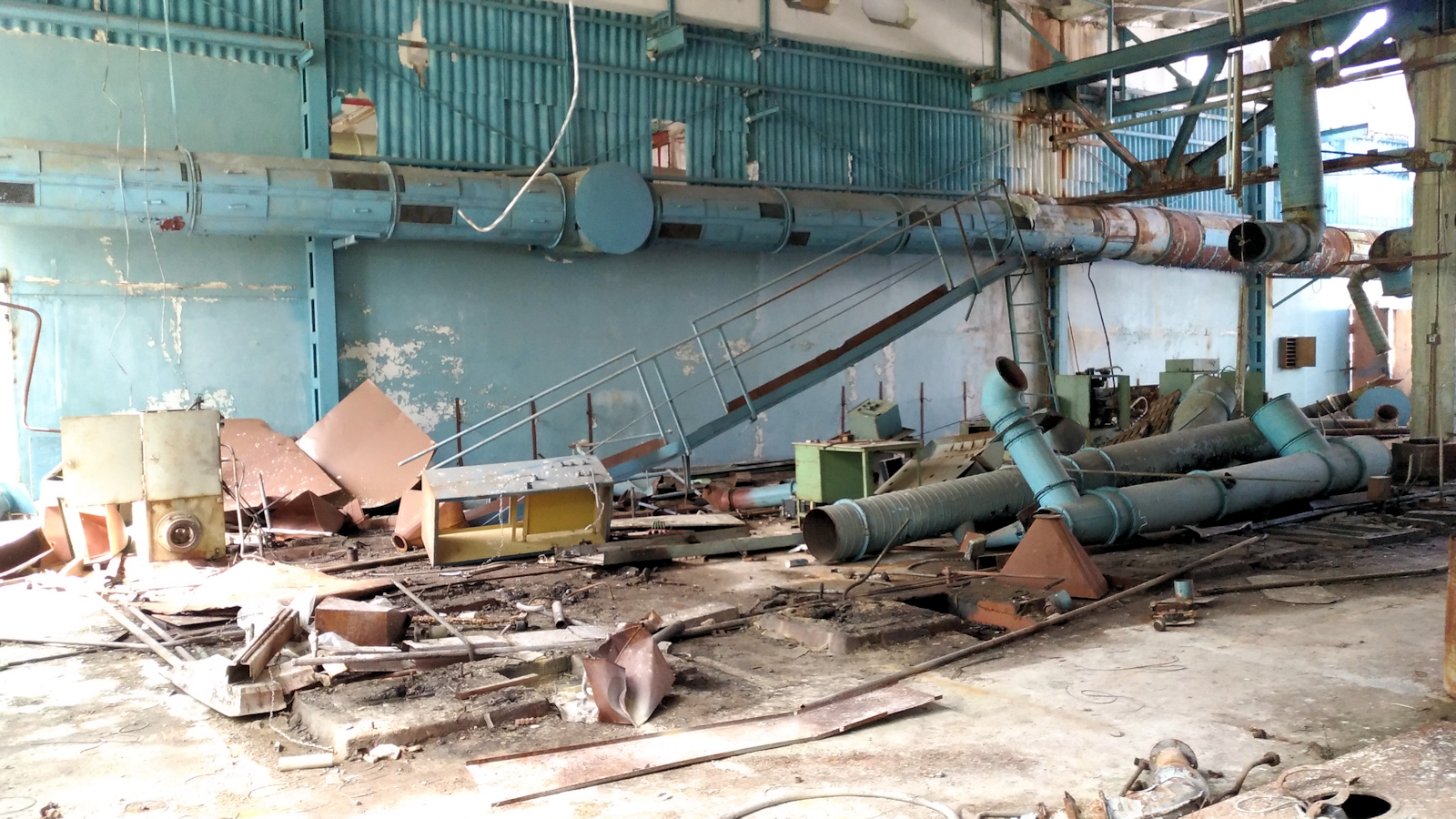
June 2019

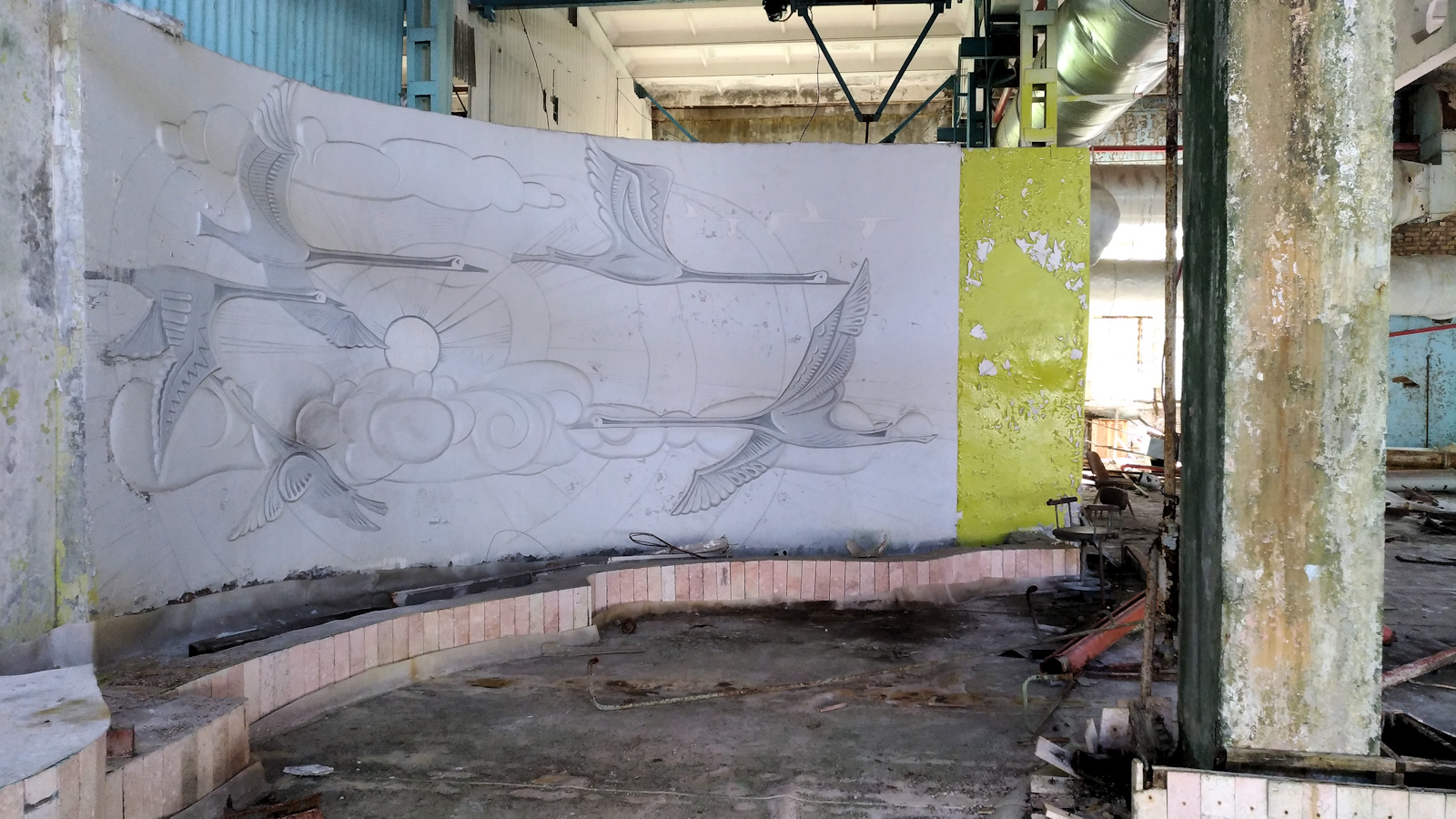
June 2019

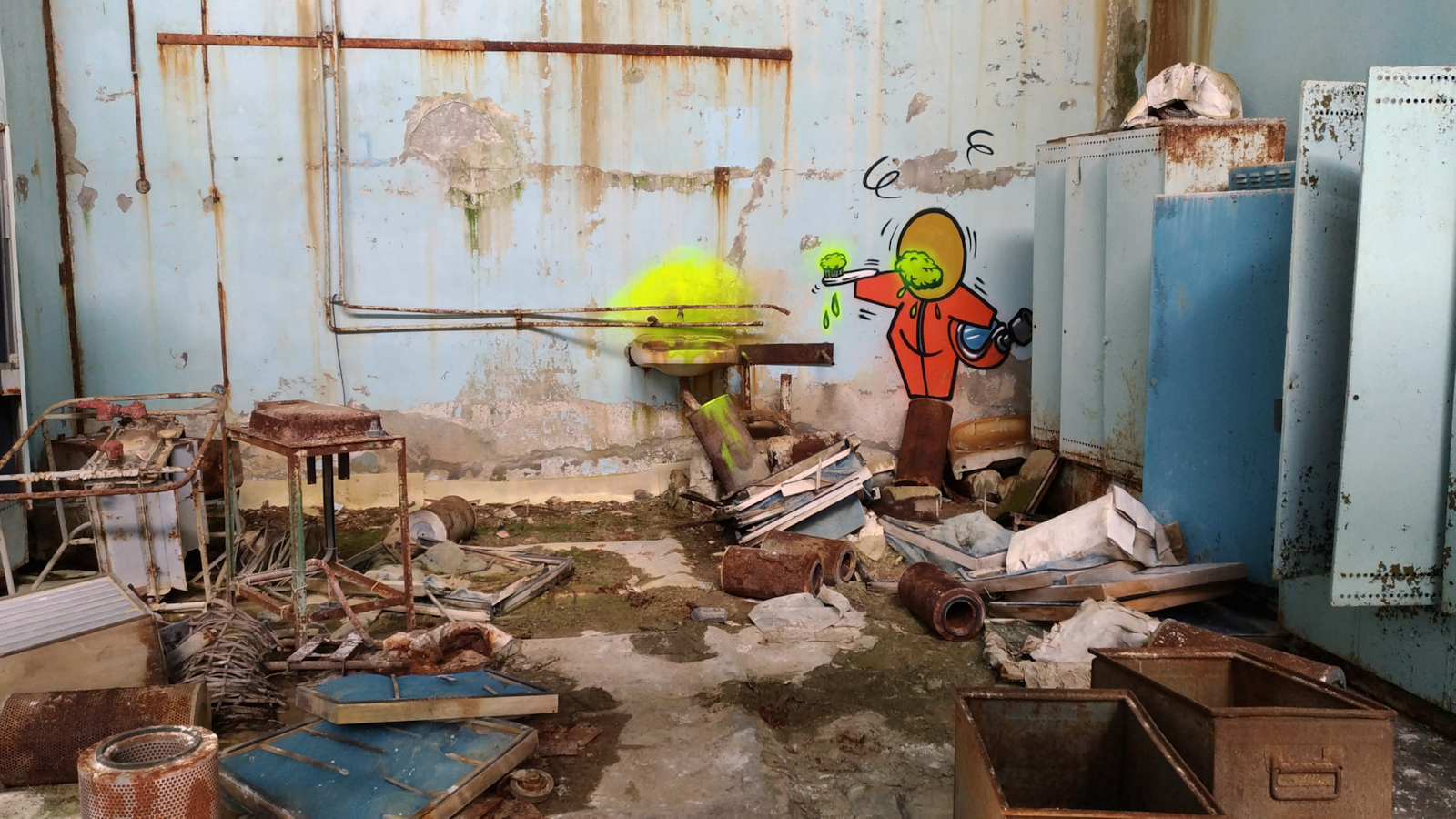
June 2019

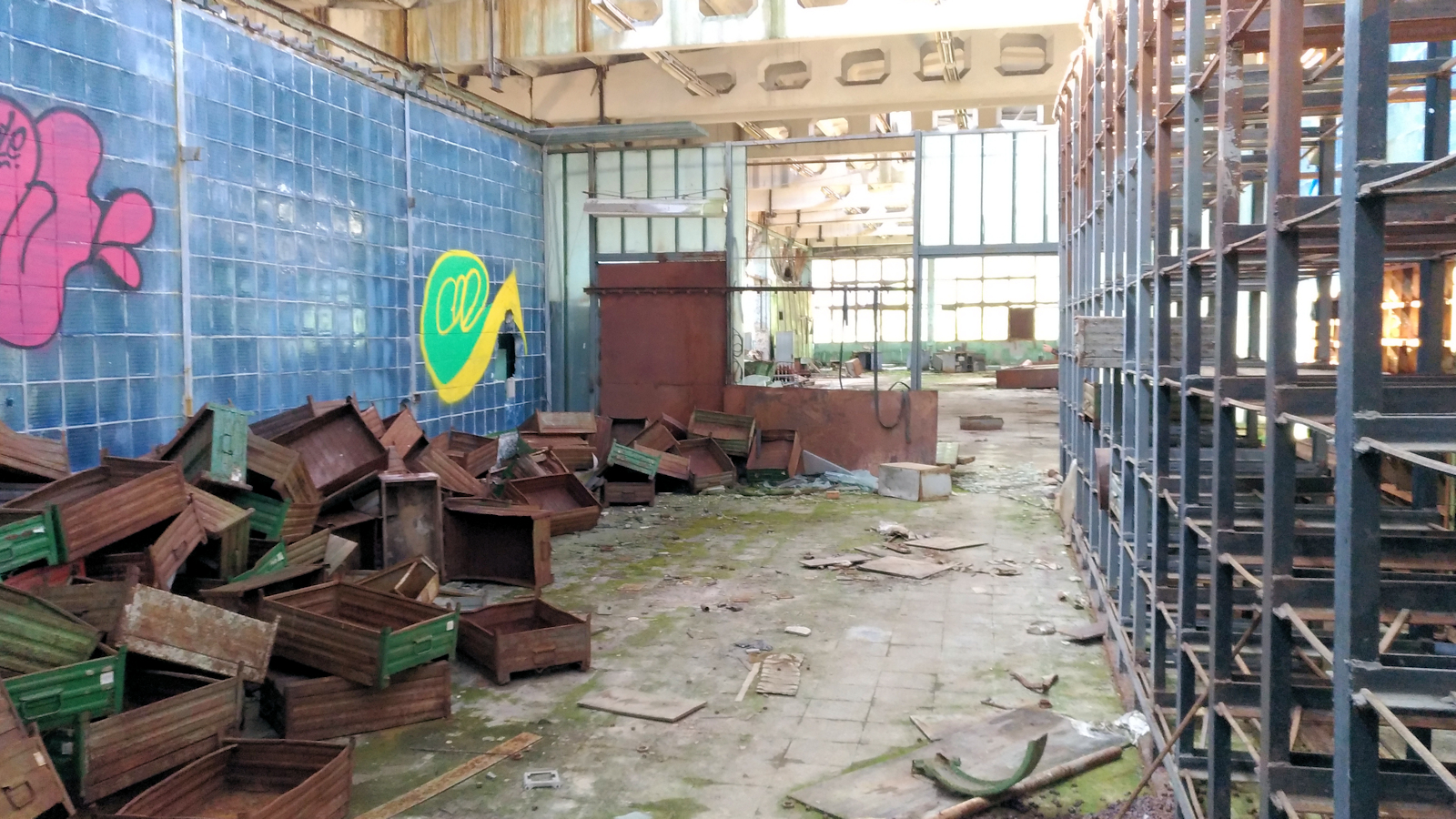
June 2019

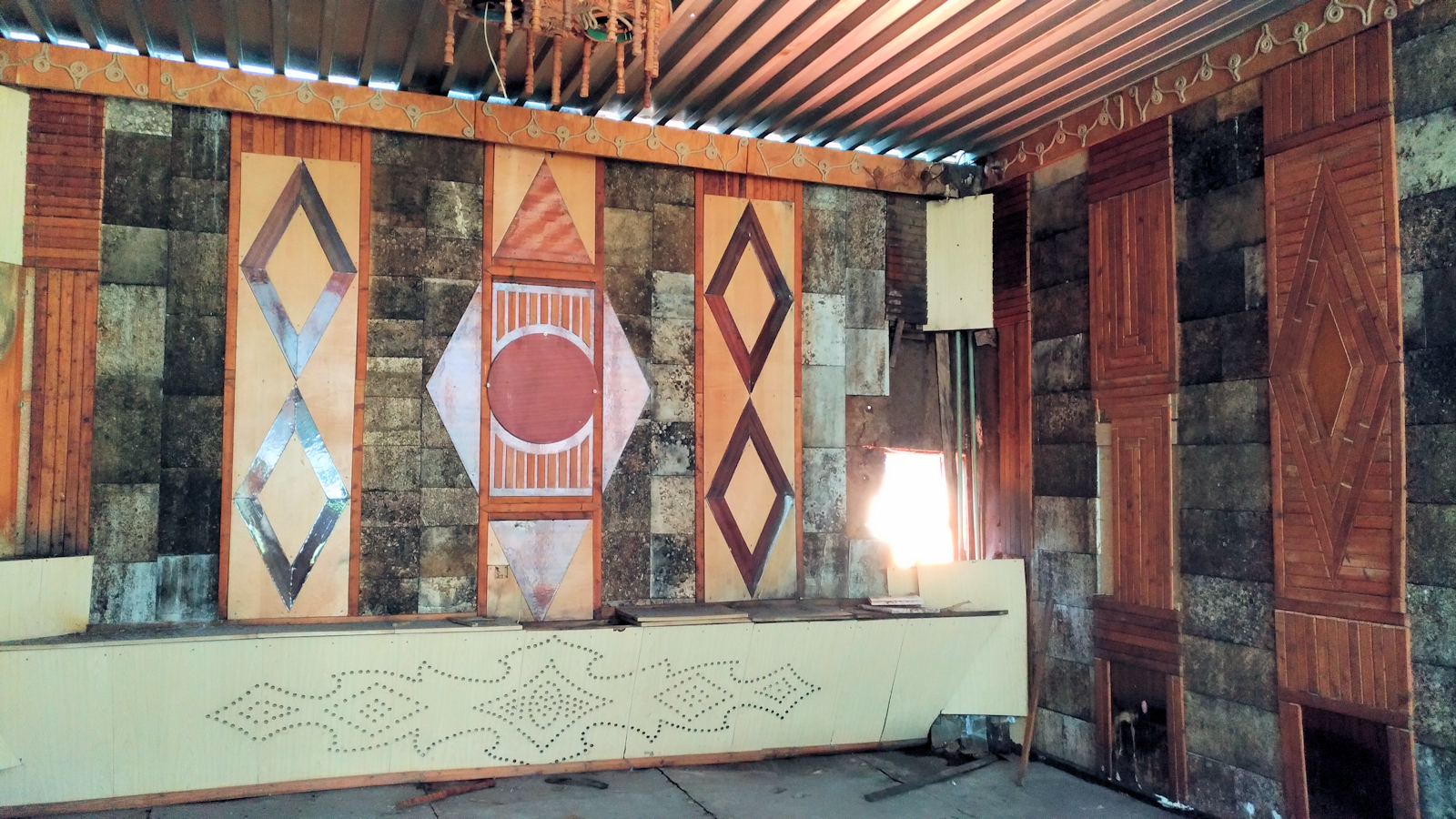
June 2019
