= Yaniv, Vyshhorod Raion, Kyiv Oblast =

Yaniv Янів
- Village
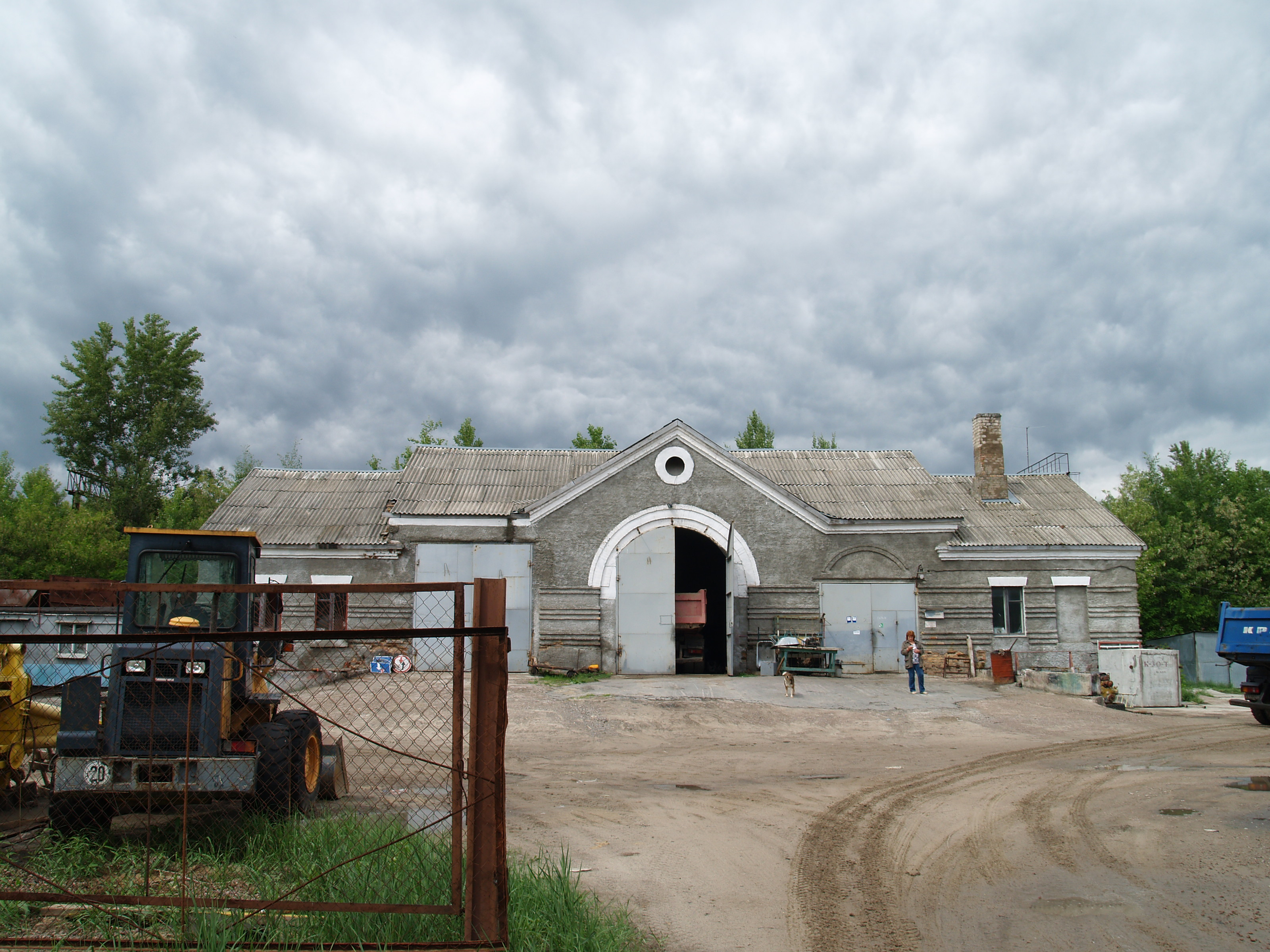
- Yaniv station building

- Location of Yaniv in Ukraine Yaniv (Kyiv Oblast)
- Coordinates: 51°23′39″N 30°3′36″E
- Country: Ukraine
- Oblast: Kyiv Oblast
- Raion: Chernobyl (1923–1980); Pripyat (de jure) (1980–present); Ivankiv Raion (1988–2020); Vyshhorod Raion (2020–present); Chernobyl Exclusion Zone (de facto) (1986–present)

Population (2006)
  - Total: 0
- (100 in 1986)
- Area code: +380 4493

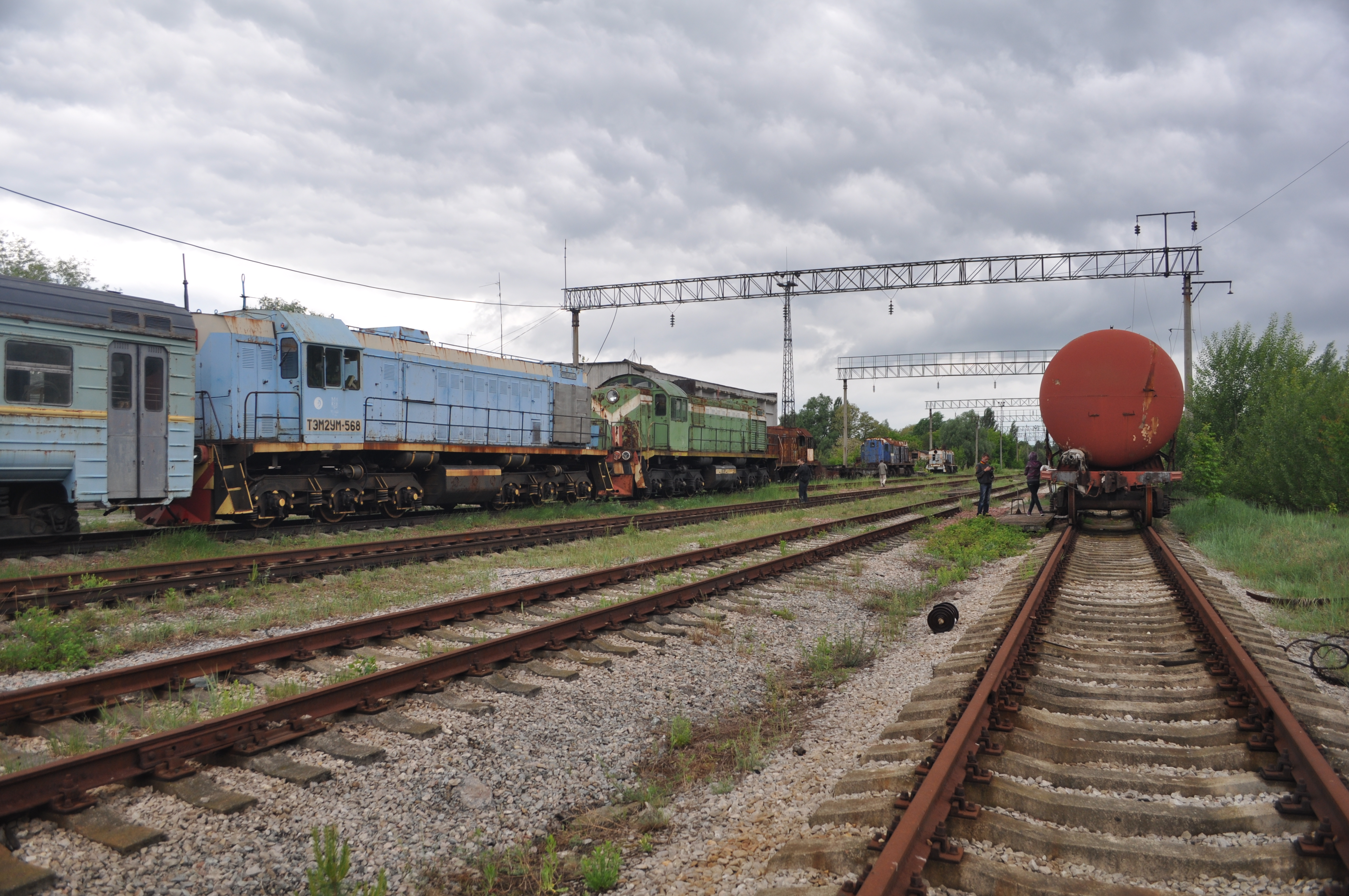
Abandoned trains at Yaniv station

Yaniv (Ukrainian: Янів; Russian: Янов, romanized: Yanov) is an abandoned village in Vyshhorod Raion, Kyiv Oblast, northern Ukraine. It is located south of Pripyat and west of the Chernobyl Nuclear Power Plant.

== History ==
First mentioned in the 18th century, it was the scene of some bloody battles between 3 and 15 October 1943, during the "Chernihiv-Pripyat Operation" of the World War II.

Part of the (now defunct) Chernobyl Raion, ten years after the construction of the nuclear plant in 1970, Yaniv became administratively part of the new adjacent city of Pripyat, founded in the same year. Immediately after the Chernobyl disaster, on April 27, 1986, the 100 villagers were completely evacuated and resettled elsewhere, due to the high level of radioactive contamination. Because of the impossibility of effective decontamination of most buildings, they were destroyed and buried in 1987.

The village, deregistered on April 1, 2003, is included in the "10 Km Zone" of the Chernobyl Exclusion Zone. De jure, it belongs to Pripyat, which didn't lose its status of "city of regional significance", but is de facto part of Vyshhorod Raion.

From February to April 2022, Yaniv was occupied by Russian forces as a result of the Russian invasion of Ukraine.

== Geography ==
Located just south of the cooperative market building of Pripyat, and next to the Bridge of Death, Yaniv is a tiny village 2 km far from the nuclear plant, 18 from the town of Chernobyl, and circa 20 from the Belarusian border.

The Yaniv railway station, mainly serving the adjacent city, was an important hub of the Chernihiv–Ovruch line, also used for long-distance trains. After the 1986 disaster, it is out of service along with Yaniv-Ovruch line section. The station building, refurbished in the 2010s, is now used by local workers to repair heavy machinery.

== See also ==
- Slavutych
