= Chernihiv railway station =

Railway station in Chernihiv, Ukraine

Chernihiv Чернігів
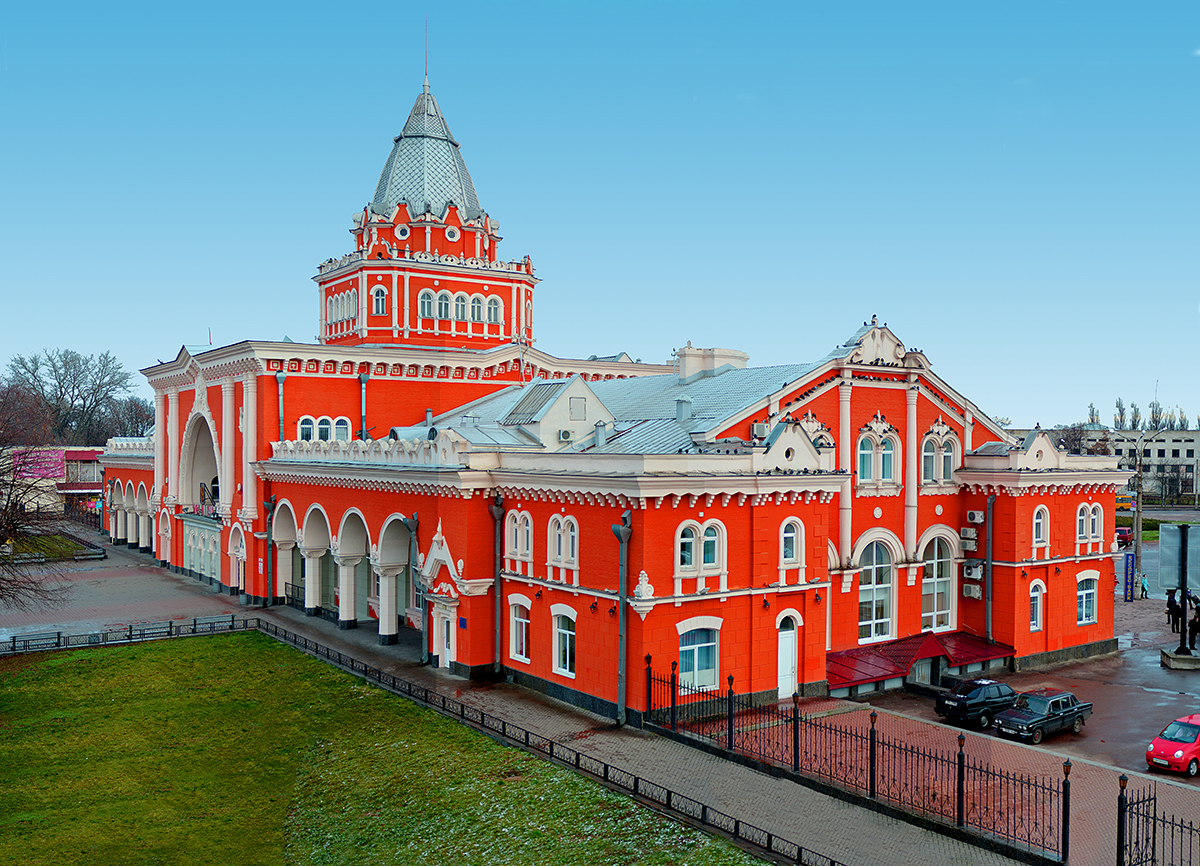

General information
- Location: Chernihiv, Ukraine
- Coordinates: 51.486199°N 31.267184°E
- Lines: Nizhyn–Gomel; Chernihiv–Chernobyl
- Platforms: 4
- Tracks: 20

History
- Opened: 1893
- Rebuilt: 1950
Location

Chernihiv railway station (Ukrainian: Чернігів) is the main train station in Chernihiv, Ukraine.

The first station was built in 1893. During the World War II, like many buildings in Chernihiv, the building of the railway station was destroyed.

The current building was built in 1948 by the project of the architect Gennady Granatkin, and the station was opened in 1950. Today the Chernihiv railway station is one of the most important railway junctions of the Southwestern Railways.

== Gallery ==
Chernihiv railway station

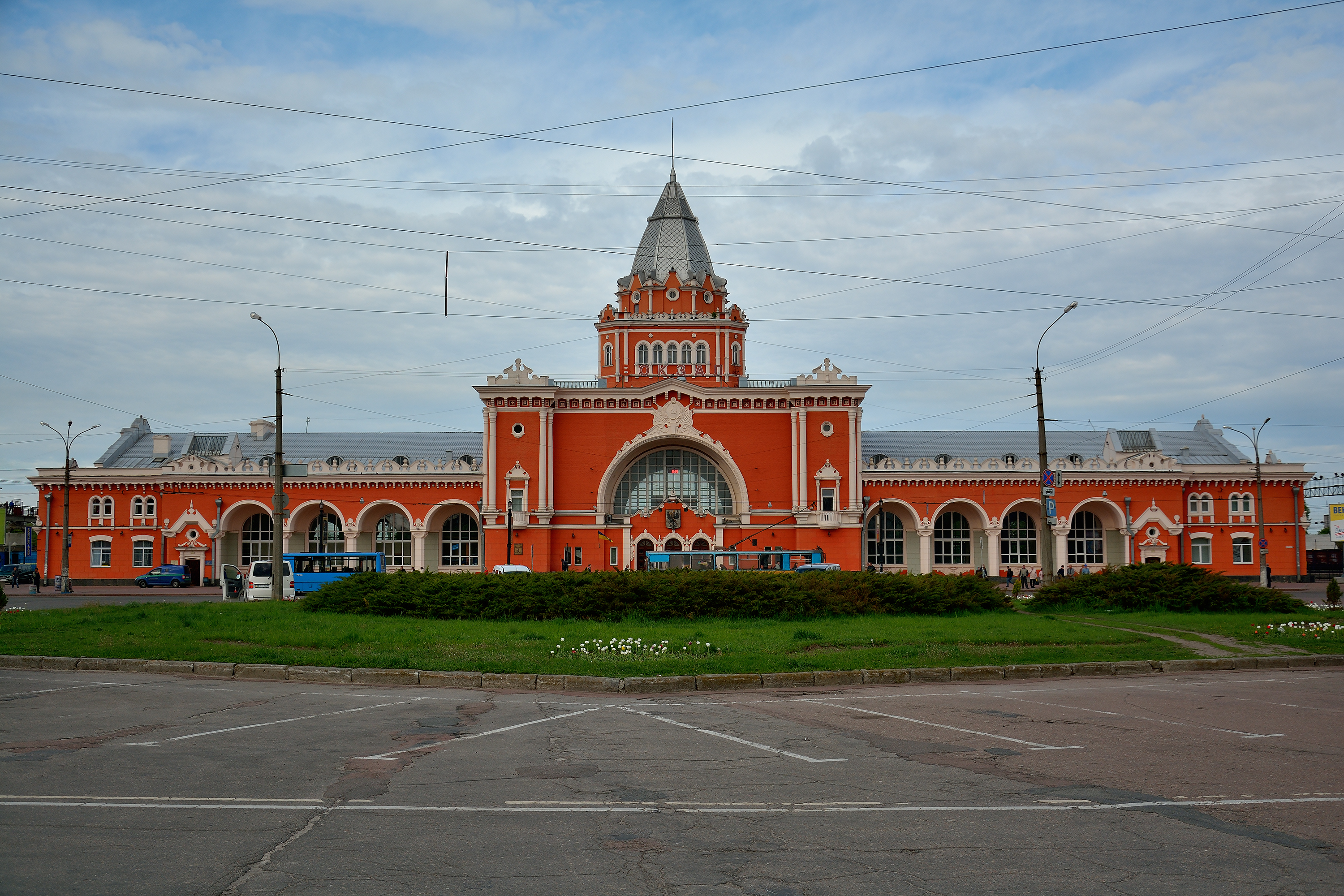
Front view

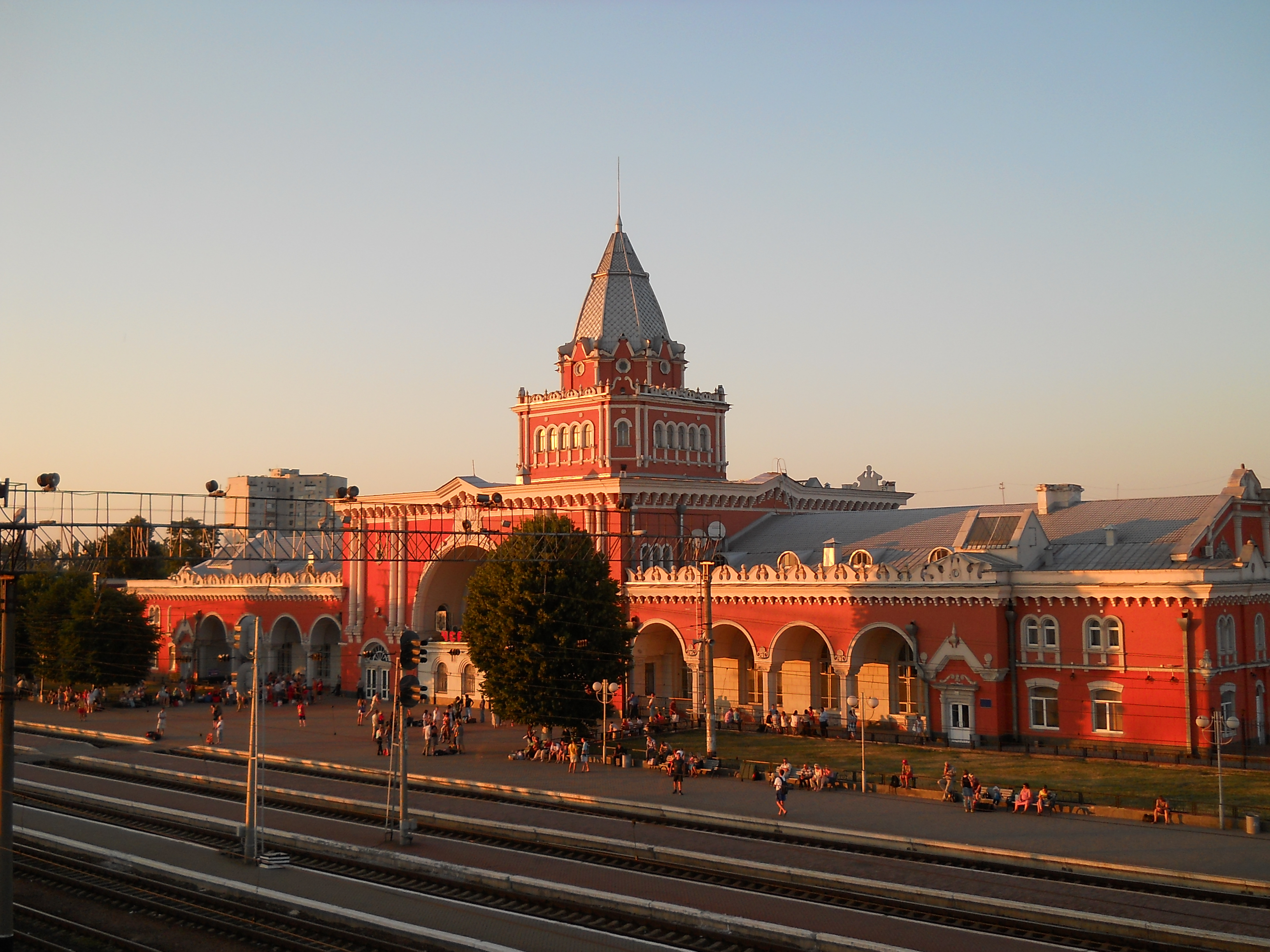
View from the track

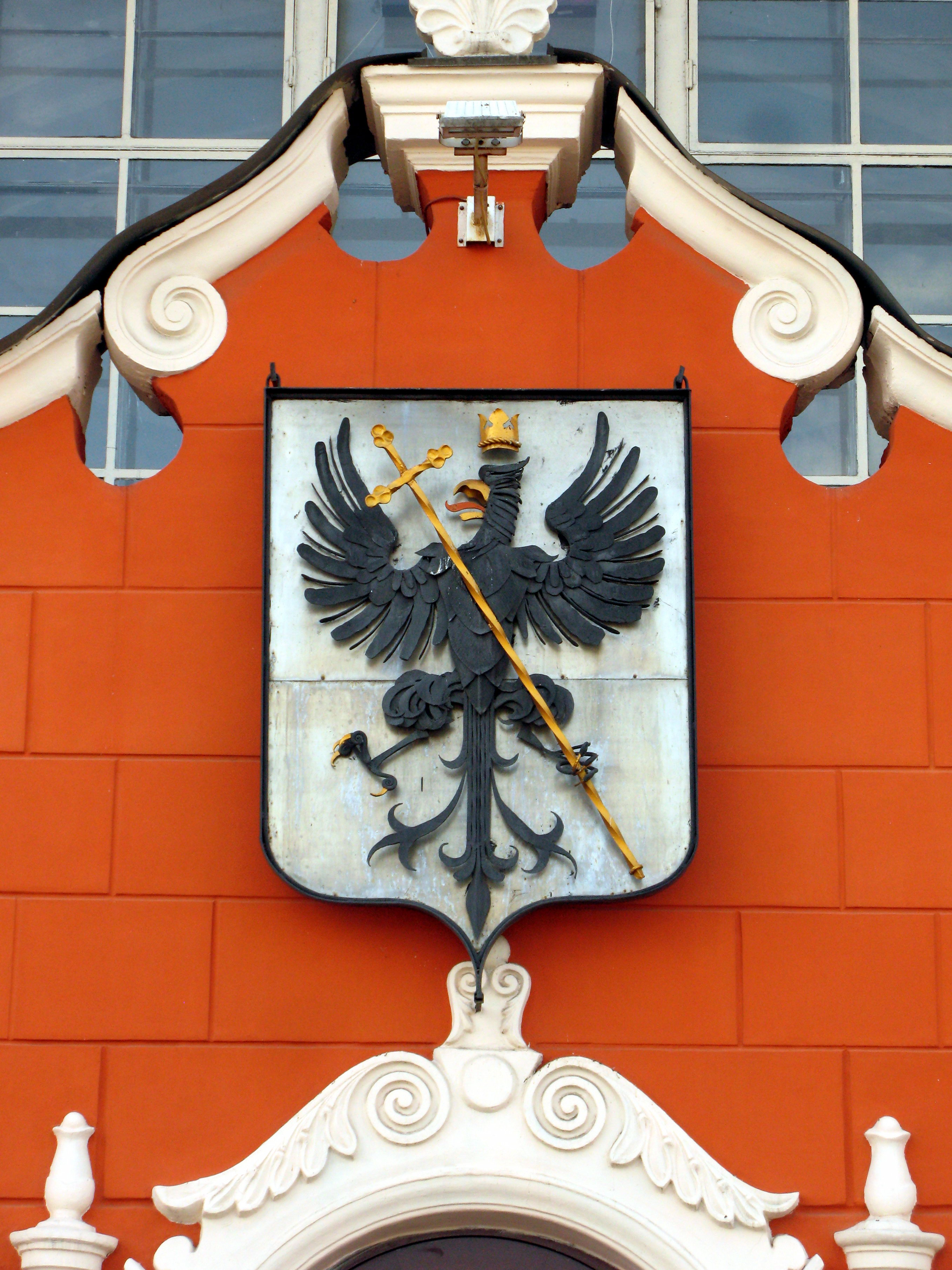
Coat of arms of the city on the facade

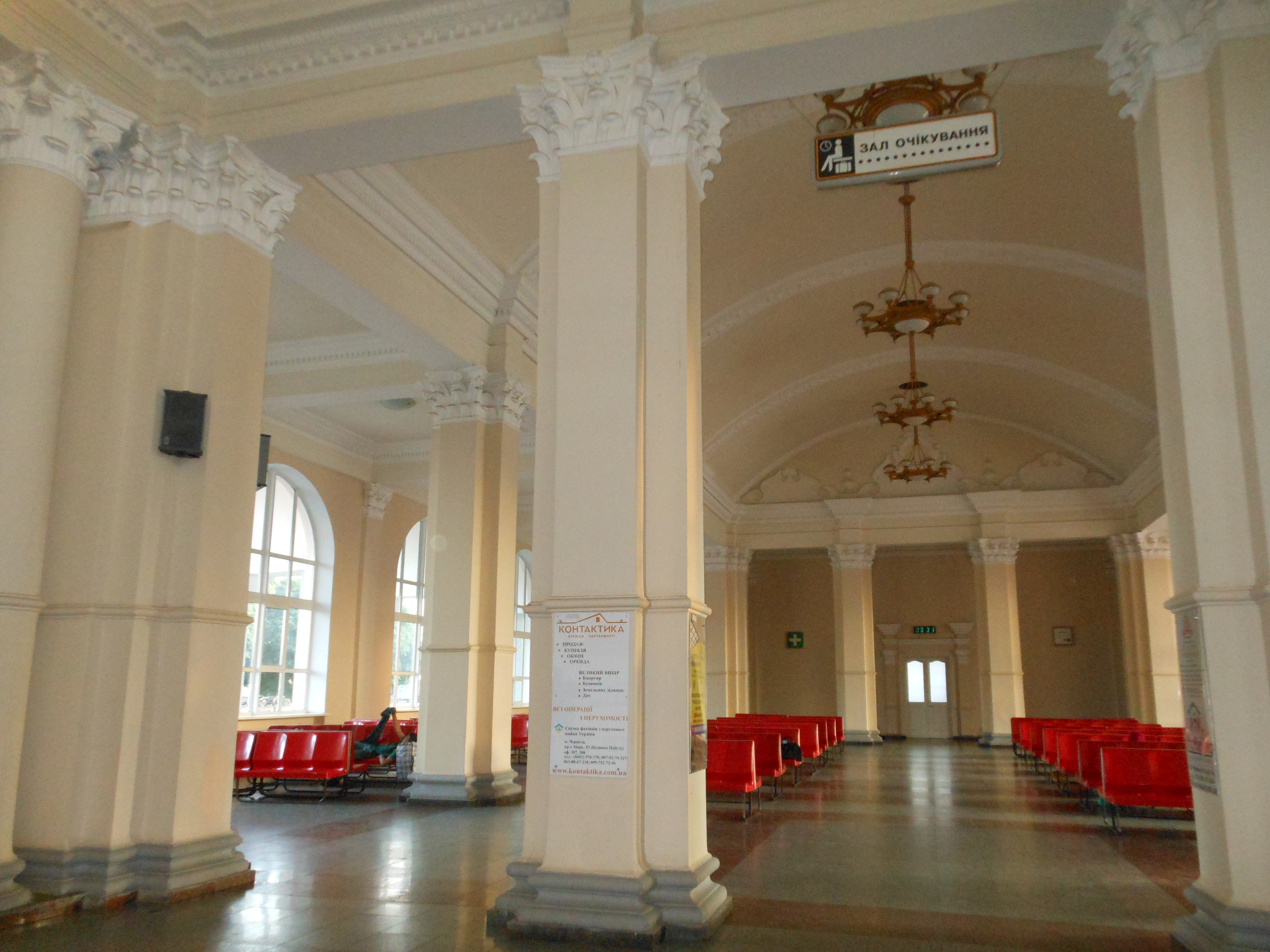
Interior

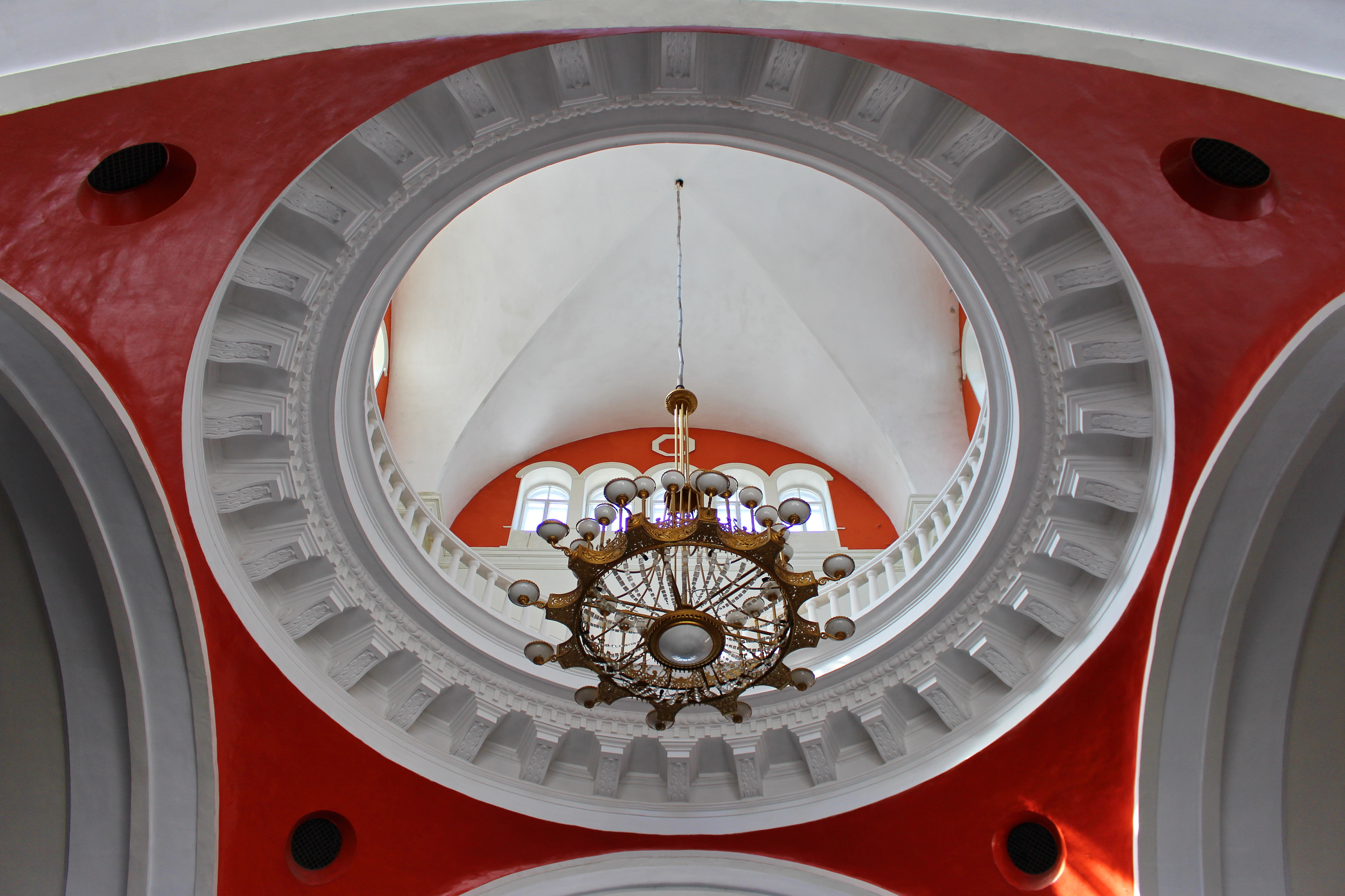
Chandelier in the lobby
