= S.T.A.L.K.E.R.: Call of Pripyat =

2009 video game

- Developer: GSC Game World
- Publishers: UKR: GSC World Publishing; NA: Deep Silver; EU: Deep Silver; WW: bitComposer Games
- Producer: Serhii Hryhorovich
- Designer: Andrii Verpakhovskyi
- Programmer: Dmytro Iasieniev
- Artists: Iurii Nehrobov; Illia Tolmachov
- Composer: Oleksii Omelchuk
- Series: S.T.A.L.K.E.R.
- Engine: X-Ray Engine
- Platforms: Microsoft Windows; PlayStation 4; Xbox One; Nintendo Switch; PlayStation 5; Xbox Series X/S
- Release: Microsoft Windows: UKR: 2 October 2009; NA: 2 February 2010; EU: 5 February 2010; AU: 25 February 2010; PS4, Xbox One: WW: 6 March 2024; Nintendo Switch: WW: 31 October 2024; PS5, Xbox Series X/S: WW: 20 May 2025
- Genres: First-person shooter, survival horror
- Modes: Single-player, multiplayer

S.T.A.L.K.E.R.: Call of Pripyat (titled S.T.A.L.K.E.R.: Call of Prypiat on consoles) (Note: Released in Ukraine as S.T.A.L.K.E.R.: Зов Припяти in its initial release and S.T.A.L.K.E.R.: Поклик Прип'яті in rereleases) is a 2009 first-person shooter survival horror video game developed by GSC Game World for Microsoft Windows. It is the third main game released in the S.T.A.L.K.E.R. series of video games, following S.T.A.L.K.E.R.: Shadow of Chernobyl and S.T.A.L.K.E.R.: Clear Sky, with the game's narrative and events following the former. It was published in the CIS territories by GSC World Publishing in October 2009, before being released by Deep Silver and bitComposer Games in North America and the PAL region in February 2010.

== Gameplay ==
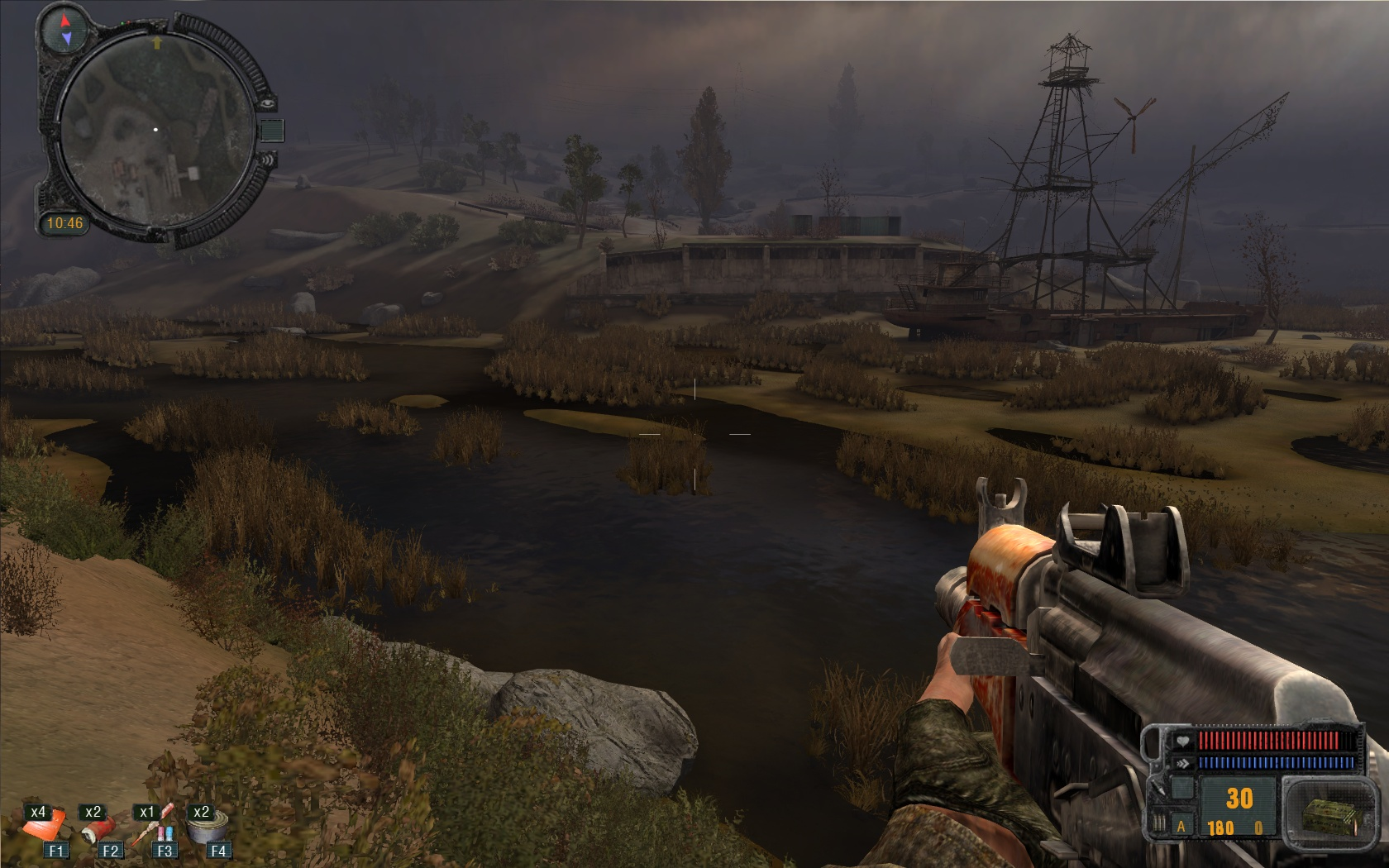
Scene from the Zone

The game takes place inside the Chernobyl exclusion zone in Ukraine, divided into three areas known as Zaton, Yanov (including Jupiter and Kopachy), and ghost city of Pripyat. Each of these is a large playable area. The majority of Call of Pripyat's gameplay focuses on a combination of both post-apocalyptic horror, as well as tactical role-playing action.

Receiving damage will usually cause bleeding, which the player must take care of with medical supplies. Similarly, unmaintained weapons and some equipment will be damaged from continued use. The condition of an item is displayed as a gauge next to the entry in the player's inventory. If severely damaged or broken, a red HUD icon will denote this.

The Zone features a limited economy, with traders and inhabitants exchanging goods and services for money and items. The game's trading system differs from the previous editions in that weapons and armor that have degraded past a certain point are unable to be sold until they are repaired, at which point the repair costs usually offset the sell price. Traders also sell information on missions and are keen to buy valuable documents.

Bandits are members of the criminal underworld who came to the Zone for different reasons; to make money by selling artifacts, hide from the law or to trade in weapons. The Zone is full of Bandits, ranging from common thugs to serious criminals, most of whom are members of one gang or another. Although the Zone gangs frequently fight amongst themselves, the criminal element still poses a serious problem for normal Stalkers. Bandits are ruthless and generally hostile to anyone not in their gang. Though depicted in Clear Sky as a united, highly territorial faction, the Bandit population in Shadow of Chernobyl consists mainly of roving groups.

Upgrading has three tiers of improvement, with each one requiring a toolkit to allow for respective tier upgrade/modification. Basic tools will allow the player to access the first tier and fine tools will allow access to the second tier. The calibration tool kits are only found in Pripyat and will give access to the last tier. The upgrade system is similar to that of Clear Sky except that the negatives of upgrades are removed. Upgrading a certain element still makes alternative upgrade options unavailable.

Various mutant creatures roam the Zone, most of which are hostile to Stalkers and will pursue and attack people who get too close. Artificial intelligence has been overhauled since the previous two games and now offers these creatures advanced and more realistic behavior. New mutants not present in Shadow of Chernobyl and Clear Sky include the Burer, a dwarf-like monster wearing a hooded cloak, with telekinetic powers; and the Chimera, a Cerberus-like cat with deadly strength.

Several factions reside in the Zone: Loners, Bandits, Mercenaries, Scientists, Zombified Stalkers, the Military, Monolith, Duty, and Freedom, the two latter ones being ideologically motivated; control and anarchy, respectively. Despite the Yanov station cease-fire, firefights will occasionally break out outside designated Safe Zones. At some certain spots of Zaton and Jupiter groups of Mercenaries, both neutral and hostile to the player, appear. The player's relations to the factions are commonly neutral. However, Zombified Stalkers and Monolith troops are hostile towards all characters.

Each day at random times in the game, "emissions" will occur: The ground will shake, an indication of the Noosphere's damaged structure is unable to hold back any longer and is about to eject lethal amounts of cascading psychic energy. The player will be warned two minutes in advance of an upcoming blowout, and must find a predesignated shelter so as not to be exposed to the psychic fallout. The sky will turn red as the blowout passes through the player's region, killing everything outside of a shelter. The player can, however, survive outside of a shelter during a blowout if he consumes special drugs that temporarily shut down his nervous system, which will cause the player to be immune to the psychic activity, thereby passing out and waking up after the blowout. Blowouts can cause new artifacts to be spawned in the anomaly fields.

Artifacts are found in or around anomalies. Players have to use special detectors to bring artifacts into the visible spectrum, as they are naturally invisible. Every time an Emission occurs, each anomaly field has a chance of creating a new artifact within its wake. These artifacts can be sold, be put into artifact slots that are incorporated into suits that the player can wear and are occasionally given as rewards for services rendered. Primarily, artifacts serve as a means to enhance the player's abilities, dependent on which artifact the player has put into his artifact slot. Most are modular and can be used in conjunction with other artifacts, or multiple artifacts of the same kind can be used to multiply their effects. Most of these artifacts emit harmful radiation, limiting their usage to short periods of time. Radiation-reducing artifacts can be used to counter this effect.

In the free play mode, the player may traverse the zone and finish all of the missions that were not finished. The player is also able to obtain hidden artifacts and unlock achievements.

== Plot ==
The game takes place soon after the events of S.T.A.L.K.E.R.: Shadow of Chernobyl. After Strelok disables the Brain Scorcher, stalkers are able to penetrate much closer to the centre of the Zone in search of rare artifacts. The government of Ukraine also takes advantage of the situation to launch Operation Fairway, a special reconnaissance mission of the Chernobyl Nuclear Power Plant with specially equipped Mil Mi-24 helicopters. Despite thorough preparations, all five of the helicopters inexplicably crash, and the Ukrainian soldiers aboard suffer heavy casualties. The protagonist, Major Alexander Degtyarev, an experienced stalker and SBU agent, is sent into the Zone to investigate the crash sites on behalf of the government.

During the course of his investigation, Degtyarev learns that the helicopters were disabled in the air by powerful shocks of electricity. He also confirms via a helicopter black box that the survivors have gone to an evacuation point somewhere in Pripyat. However, the city is sealed off due to The Zone's environment. The Major eventually finds an underground passageway to Pripyat and gathers a small team of stalkers to help him traverse this tunnel. After fighting through mutants and the mysterious Monolith faction, they reach the abandoned city and link up with the surviving soldiers from the helicopter crashes.

The player eventually meets the protagonist of Shadow of Chernobyl, Strelok, and learns of the secrets behind the Zone, including how anomalies change position during and after each emission – explaining why the helicopters crashed in the first place.

The game concludes with the survivors, Strelok, and the player evacuating the Zone while being attacked by hordes of enemies. Before boarding the rescue helicopters, the player is given the choice to leave the Zone forever or stay. If the player decides not to leave the Zone, then the game enters into free-play mode. During free-play mode, the player can freely explore areas and finish side-missions, while given the option to leave at any time through NPCs.

The game's ending differs depending on the actions of the player during the game. How the player handles in-game missions, and whether certain NPCs are alive or not by the end of the game directly affect the ending sequence. Despite different endings, one thing that remains the same is the belief that the Zone is expanding, and might actually encompass Ukraine and the rest of Europe.

== Development and release ==
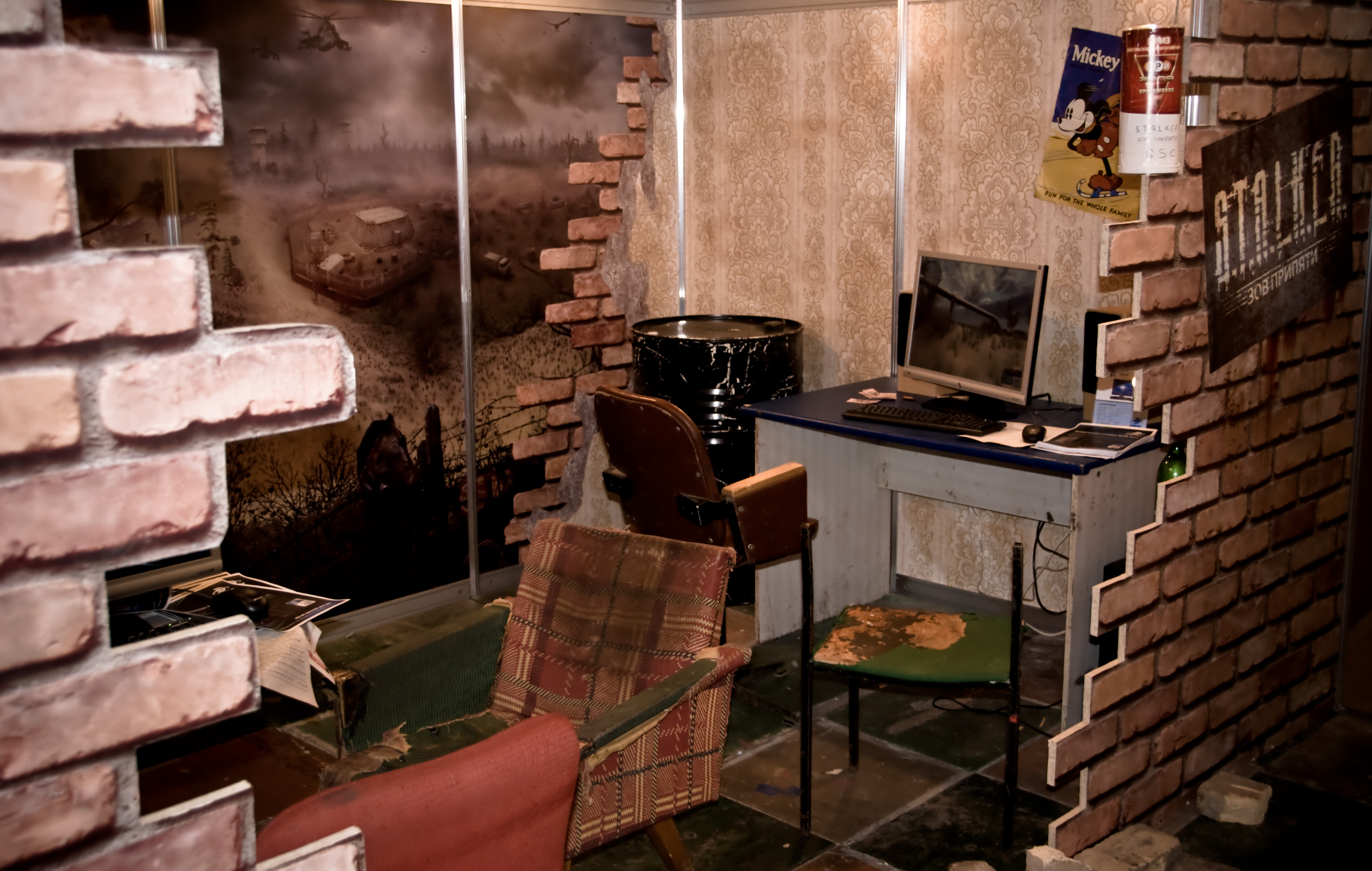
Promotion at the Russian Game Developers Conference 2009

Call of Pripyat utilizes the X-Ray Engine 1.6, allowing advanced modern graphical features through the use of DirectX 11 to be fully integrated; one outstanding feature being the inclusion of real-time GPU tessellation. Regions and maps feature photo realistic scenes of the region it is made to represent. There is also extensive support for older versions of DirectX, meaning that Call of Pripyat is also compatible with DirectX 9 through 11. The game is AMD Eyefinity validated.

The game has a Limited Special Edition, released only in Germany, that features an A3-sized map of the Zone, 2 faction patches, a stalker bandanna and a "stalker" lighter, as well as the metal case in which the game is included. Also another Special Edition, released in the rest of Europe, that includes Art Cards, an A2-sized map of the Zone and the Soundtrack CD, was released. In North American territories, a Collector's Edition has been released, containing a smaller version of the Zone's map, a tech-tree poster and stickers. Call of Pripyat is also available through multiple digital distribution outlets.

The game was released on Xbox One, PlayStation 4 and Nintendo Switch as part of the collection S.T.A.L.K.E.R.: Legends of the Zone Trilogy with its subtitle being changed to "Call of Prypiat".

== Reception ==
Reception

Aggregate score
Aggregator	Score
Metacritic	80/100

Review scores
Publication	Score
Edge	7/10
Eurogamer	8/10
GamesMaster	79%
GameSpot	8/10
GameSpy	4/5
GameZone	8.5/10
IGN	8.2/10
PC Format	80%
PC Gamer (UK)	87%
PC PowerPlay	9/10

Call of Pripyat received "favorable" reviews according to the review aggregation website Metacritic. The game was lauded for its well optimized engine with relatively few bugs and glitches, for example, GameSpot said, "The most stable S.T.A.L.K.E.R. game yet also happens to be the most atmospheric and compelling." Other reviews by websites previously opposed to new titles in the series have also given Call of Pripyat positive reviews. While Eurogamer rated the S.T.A.L.K.E.R. franchise's previous installment (Clear Sky) to be a significant disappointment, they gave more positive feedback in their review of the recent addition, saying "Only the slight sensation of datedness prevents this from scoring higher, and no doubt once the mods start flowing the value for money will get even better. But there's plenty here to keep the faithful feeling extremely optimistic about the prospect of a proper sequel. And there's still nothing out there quite like STALKER."

Though the reviews of the game's artificial intelligence system were positive, GameSpot did note that the combat AI at times seemed unfairly good, and that "Human enemies facing away from you have the uncanny ability to notice when you peek out a window behind them and are remarkably good shots in the dead of night, even without night vision scopes equipped." However, "[D]espite a bit of cheating, Call of Pripyat rarely feels unfair."

Call of Pripyat was entered in PC Gamer's Top 100 PC games of all time in 2011, ranked in 38th place.
