= Yaniv railway station =

Former railway station in Yaniv, Ukraine

Yaniv, Yanov Ukrainian: Янів, Russian: Янов
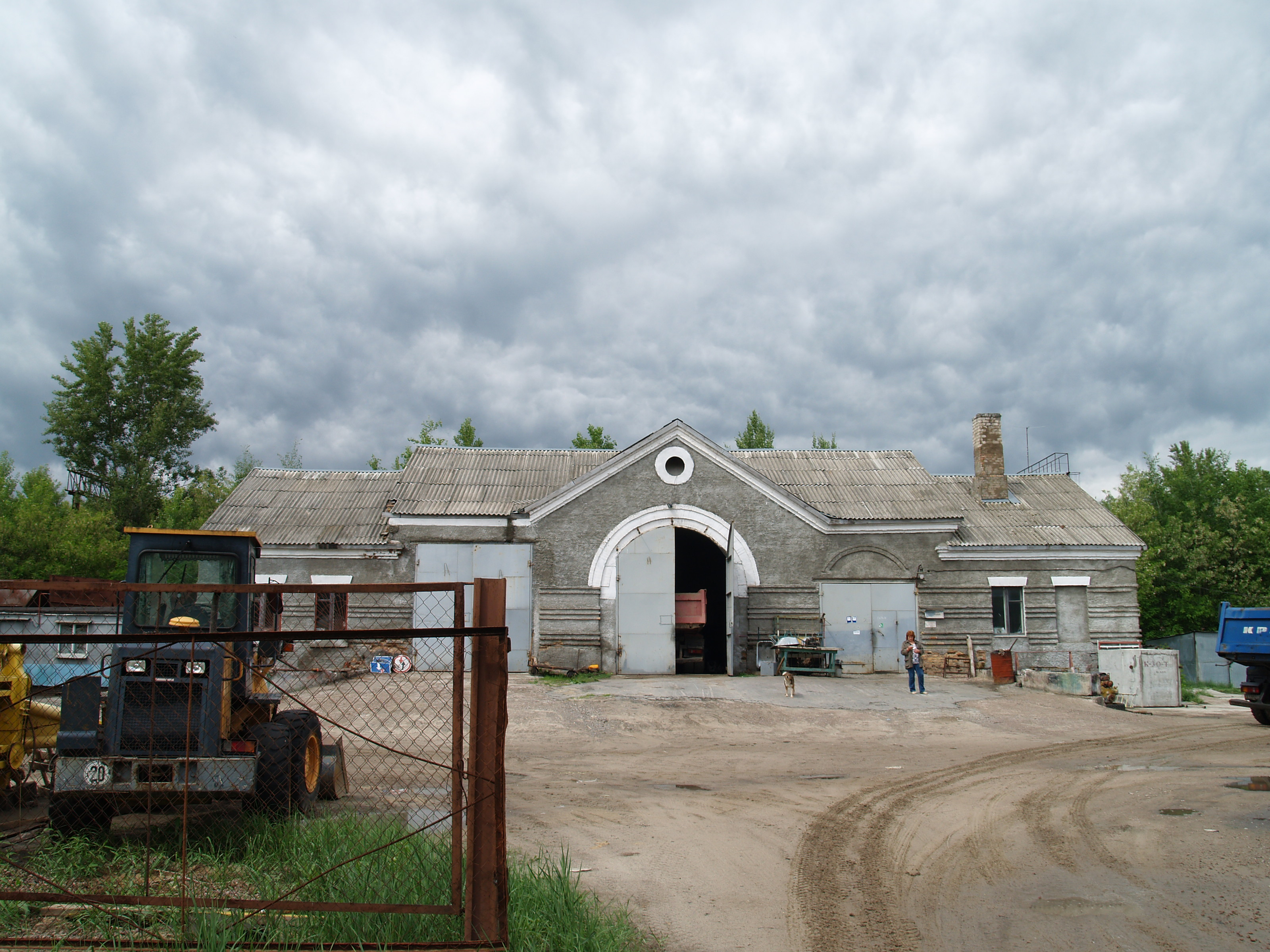
- Station building

General information
- Location: Yaniv (south of Pripyat); Ukraine
- Coordinates: 51.3942°N 30.0564°E
- Line: Chernihiv–Ovruch
- Platforms: 2
- Tracks: 4

Other information
- Station code: 347103

History
- Opened: 1925
- Closed: 27 April 1986 (emergency)
Location

Yaniv railway station (Ukrainian: Янів), also named Yanov station (Russian: Янов), is an abandoned Ukrainian station located in the Chernobyl Exclusion Zone. Sometimes referred to as Pripyat station, it lies in the village of Yaniv, south of the city of Pripyat, and is part of the Chernihiv–Ovruch railway. It is included in the transport sector state-owned enterprise Chernobylservis.

== History ==
The station was commissioned in 1925 and the village and the station of Yaniv gave rise to the city of Pripyat.

Before the 1986 accident at the Chornobyl Nuclear Power Plant, the station belonged to Southwestern Railways. The station received passenger and freight transportation, and adjoined driveways, tank farms and other enterprises in the city of Pripyat. Among the passenger traffic, it was also served by the long-distance express train Moscow-Khmelnytskyi.

During 1986 there was a reconstruction of the railway section from Chernihiv to Yaniv to provide service to the Chornobyl staff and contractors, and the section from Yaniv to Slavutych was electrified. Prior to 2021, the section was not being used and was partly dismantled at the station and on the stretch from Yaniv–Semykhody.

In 2017, the Ukrainian government decided to extend the Vilcha-Semykhody section of the Chernihiv-Ovruch railway from the previously dismantled Semykhody railway station to Vilcha for easier access to the Chornobyl New Safe Confinement of the Chornobyl Nuclear Power Plant. The job was given to Energoatom. One of the rail tracks passing through Yaniv was reconstructed, and construction began with two teams beginning at Vilcha and Yaniv station. On 9 July 2021 the two teams met and placed the "golden spike".

== Structure ==
In the central part of the station, there are three receiving-departure paths and devices for cargo operations. In the western part there is a locomotive column that supplied water to the locomotives.

== In popular culture ==
The Yaniv railway station features as an important location in the 2010 PC game S.T.A.L.K.E.R: Call of Pripyat and the 2024 game S.T.A.L.K.E.R. 2.

== Gallery ==
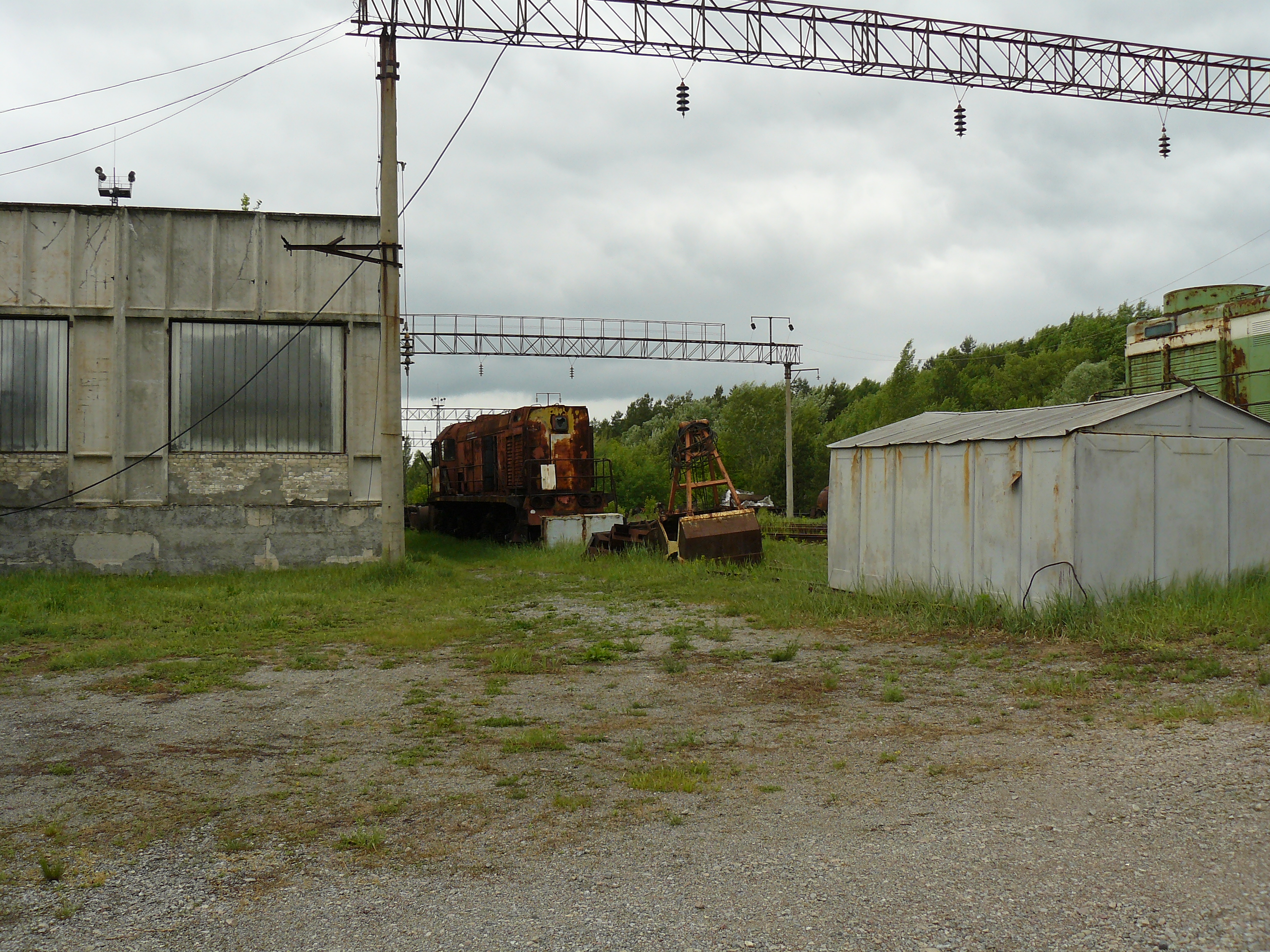
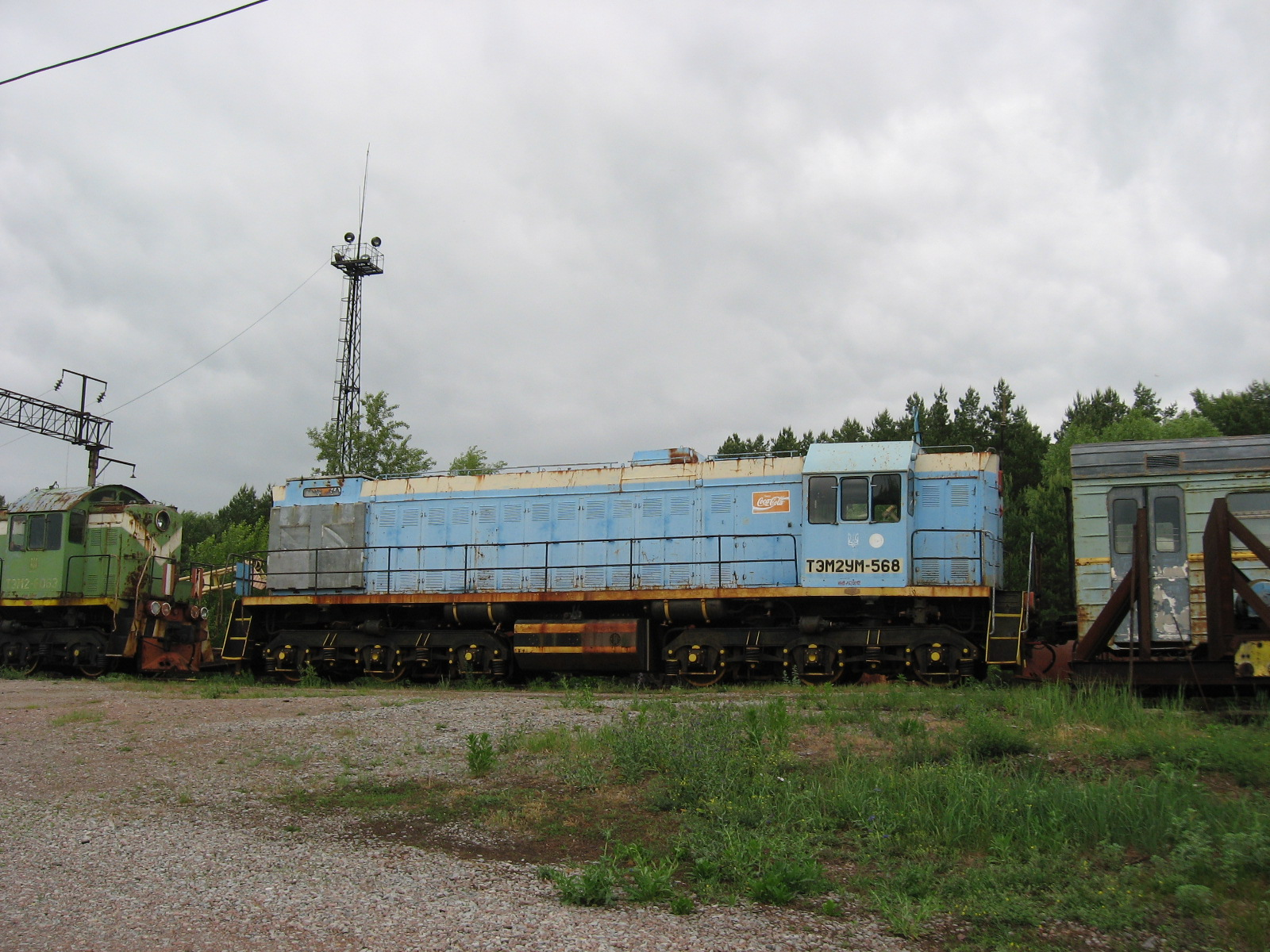
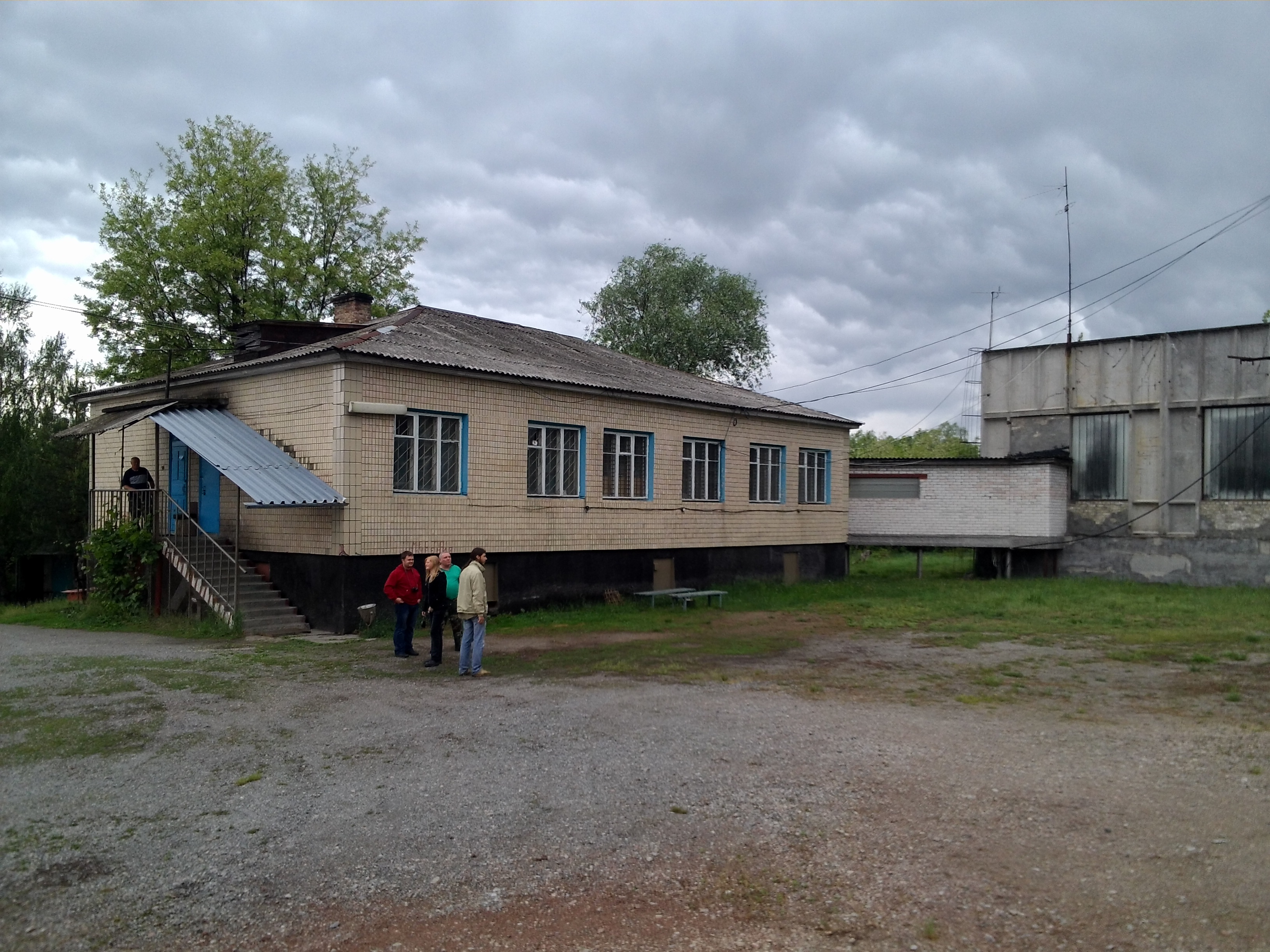
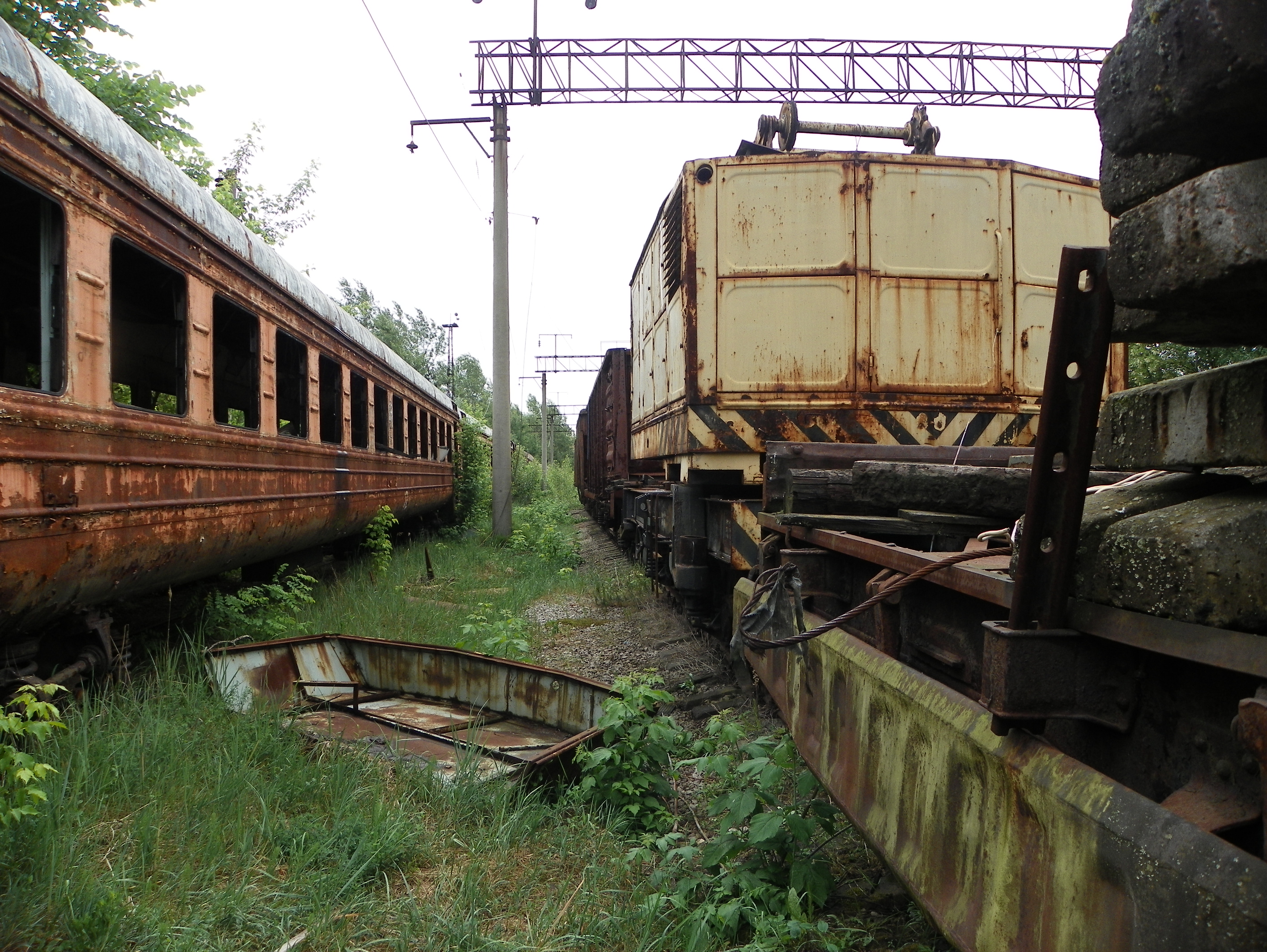
