= Russian occupation of Zhytomyr Oblast =

Military occupation by Russia

- Part of the 2022 Russian invasion of Ukraine
- Date: 24 February 2022–4 April 2022 (1 month, 1 week and 4 days)
- Location: Zhytomyr Oblast, Ukraine

The Russian occupation of Zhytomyr Oblast was a military occupation that began with the Russian invasion of Ukraine on 24 February 2022. The capital, Zhytomyr was never captured and was bombed in the 2022 Zhytomyr attacks. Small towns and settlements were however captured, in the north-west and north-central Korosten Raion, near the border with Kyiv Oblast.

In Zhytomyr Oblast's Narodychi settlement hromada, which borders Kyiv Oblast and the Gomel Region of Belarus, the villages of Radcha, Stara Radcha, Nova Radcha, Davydky, and Hrezlya came under Russian control on 24 February. Russian forces in tanks with the letter V established positions in around Hrezlya, which lies at the intersection of highways leading to Narodychi and Ovruch. Of the five villages, the majority of Russian troops were stationed in Hrezlya, which was liberated along with the others on 3 April.

According to the head of the Ovruch territorial community, during the Russian invasion of Ukraine, Russian troops did not attempt to cross the state border of Ukraine at the Vystupovychi border crossing.

The village of Rubezhivka was also under Russian occupation for several days, according to local official.

According to the Ukrainian military, Russian forces were planning to occupy the city of Malyn in Zhytomyr Oblast, but were held back by Ukraine's 10th Mountain Assault Brigade, which held the line on the border of the Zhytomyr and Kyiv Oblasts. The nearest battles were fought a distance of 25 kilometers from the city, according to a member of the brigade.

Russian forces advanced from Gomel Oblast, Belarus into Zhytomyr Oblast, at first capturing several settlements such as Pershotravneve and Vystupovychi. More troops later arrived in north-central Zhytomyr Oblast, and captured Chervonosilka, Verkhnia Rudnia, Selezivka and Syrnytsia. Russian troops also spilled over from Kyiv Oblast and took control of Kocheriv, Kvitneve and Staseva.

== Control of cities ==
Name	Pop.	Raion	Held by	As of	More information
Berdychiv	73,999	Berdychiv	Ukraine	24 Feb 2022	
Narodychi	2,907	Korosten	Ukraine	4 Apr 2022	
Pershotravneve	2,260	Korosten	Ukraine	3 Apr 2022	
Radcha	265	Korosten	Ukraine	3 Apr 2022	Captured by Russia 24 February 2022; Recaptured by Ukraine 3 April 2022
Zhytomyr	263,507	Zhytomyr	Ukraine	24 Feb 2022	See 2022 Zhytomyr attacks, Infrastructure attacks
Zviahel	55,463	Zviahel	Ukraine	24 Feb 2022	

== See also ==
- Outline of the Russo-Ukrainian war
- Russian-occupied territories of Ukraine (former occupation marked in italics)
  - Russian occupation of Crimea
  - Russian occupation of Chernihiv Oblast
  - Russian occupation of Donetsk Oblast
  - Russian occupation of Dnipropetrovsk Oblast
  - Russian occupation of Kharkiv Oblast
  - Russian occupation of Kherson Oblast
  - Russian occupation of Kyiv Oblast
  - Russian occupation of Luhansk Oblast
  - Russian occupation of Mykolaiv Oblast
  - Russian occupation of Sumy Oblast
  - Russian occupation of Zaporizhzhia Oblast
  - Snake Island campaign
- Annexation of Crimea by the Russian Federation
