= 141st Rifle Division =

141st Rifle Division (September 1939 – September 19, 1941) 141st Rifle Division (December 26, 1941 – July 1945)
- Active: 1939–1945
- Country: Soviet Union
- Branch: Red Army (1939-46)
- Type: Infantry
- Size: Division
- Engagements: Soviet annexation of Western Belorussia; Soviet occupation of Bessarabia and Northern Bukovina; Operation Barbarossa; Battle of Uman; Case Blue; Ostrogozhsk–Rossosh offensive Voronezh–Kastornoye offensive Lgov-Rylsk offensive Battle of Kursk; Battle of the Dnieper; Battle of Kiev (1943); Zhitomir–Berdichev offensive Kamenets–Podolsky pocket Lvov-Sandomierz Offensive; Battle of the Dukla Pass; Budapest offensive Siege of Budapest; Western Carpathian offensive Vienna offensive
- Decorations: Order of the Red Banner; Order of Bogdan Khmelnitsky (both 2nd Formation)
- Battle honours: Kyiv (2nd Formation)

Commanders
- Notable commanders: Maj. Gen. Yakov Ivanovich Tonkonogov; Col. Yakov Stepanovich Vorobyov; Col. Yakov Petrovich Tetushkin; Col. Semyon Sergeevich Rassadnikov; Col. Aleksandr Yakovlevich Klimenko; Col. Ivan Sergeevich Pakhomov; Maj. Gen. Vasilii Nokolaevich Molozhaev

The 141st Rifle Division was first formed as an infantry division of the Red Army in early September 1939 in the Kharkov Military District, based on the shtat (table of organization and equipment) of September 13. Although barely formed it took part in the invasion of eastern Poland later that month as part of Ukrainian Front, and the next year also took part in the occupation of the Romanian territories of Bessarabia and northern Bukovina. At the start of the German invasion it was in western Ukraine, assigned to 6th Army. As Army Group South advanced the 141st gradually fell back toward Uman, where it was encircled and destroyed in early August, being stricken from the Red Army's order of battle on September 19.

A new 141st began forming on December 26, mostly in the Moscow Military District as part of 3rd, and later 6th Reserve Armies. The latter became the new 6th Army in Voronezh Front in July, but the division was soon transferred to 40th Army of the same Front. Through the summer it fought a series of battles for bridgeheads over the Don River with only minor success. During January 1943, in the wake of Operation Little Saturn, it participated in the offensive that surrounded Axis forces south and west of the Don before pressing on to help liberate Voronezh as part of 60th Army. Following this victory it advanced to the northwest toward Kursk, helping to take that place in early February, then moving due west toward Lgov and Rylsk, being stopped before the latter in March. Now as part of Central Front, the 60th fortified its positions at the tip of the Kursk salient over the following months, although no German attack was expected there. The 141st took no active part in the Kursk offensives, but in late August began an advance through eastern Ukraine which took it to bridgeheads north of Kyiv, soon joining 1st Ukrainian Front. It fought in these positions through October and into early November when the city was captured and it received its name as a battle honor. Later that month it was involved in heavy fighting with German forces attempting to retake the city, and had one rifle regiment encircled at Zhytomyr, which was forced to break out at considerable cost in casualties. Zhytomyr was retaken in the Zhitomir–Berdichev offensive, and during the following Proskurov-Chernivtsi offensive the 141st distinguished itself sufficiently to be awarded the Order of the Red Banner. It was now under command of 1st Guards Army. Although this Army was initially holding a defensive line during the Lvov-Sandomierz operation it went over to the attack on July 21 and the division and its subunits received several awards over the following weeks, primarily for the battles for Stanislav, while the division as a whole won the Order of Bogdan Khmelnitsky. Following this operation 1st Guards Army was transferred to 4th Ukrainian Front for an advance into the Carpathian Mountains toward Hungary, a grinding campaign that lasted into October, during which the 141st was briefly transferred to 18th Army, and then to 7th Guards Army in 2nd Ukrainian Front, where it would remain for the duration of the war. It played a relatively minor role in the campaign that encircled Budapest, then in the winter of 1945 moved north into Slovakia and Austria, ending the war in Czechoslovakia. The division and its subunits had compiled a fine record with many awards, but it was disbanded in July.

== 1st Formation ==
The division was formed on the basis of the 239th "Donbas" Rifle Regiment of 80th Rifle Division at Slavyansk in the Kharkov Military District during early September 1939. Given this experienced cadre it was able to take part in the invasion of eastern Poland later that month. Maj. Gen. Yakov Ivanovich Tonkonogov was given command of the 141st on August 16, 1940, and he would remain in command for the duration of the first formation. This officer had served as an advisor to the Republican Army in the Spanish Civil War and most recently as deputy commander of the 24th Rifle Division. His chief of staff was Col. Ivan Maksimovich Bondarenko and his deputy commander for political affairs was Brigade Commissar Alexei Yosifovich Kushchevskii. At the start of the German invasion the division was deployed in positions northwest of Proskuriv. It was in 6th Army's 37th Rifle Corps of the Kiev Special Military District (soon redesignated Southwestern Front), which also contained the 139th and 80th Rifle Divisions. Its order of battle was as follows:

- 687th Rifle Regiment
- 745th Rifle Regiment
- 796th Rifle Regiment
- 348th Artillery Regiment
- 253rd Howitzer Artillery Regiment
- 210th Antitank Battalion
- 332nd Antiaircraft Battalion
- 138th Reconnaissance Battalion
- 207th Sapper Battalion
- 201st Signal Battalion
- 146th Medical/Sanitation Battalion
- 141st Chemical Defense (Anti-gas) Platoon
- 153rd Motor Transport Battalion
- 153rd Field Bakery
- 174th Field Postal Station
- 347th Field Office of the State Bank

As word came of the advance of 1st Panzer Group toward Kremenets the 37th Corps began moving to the north, with the 141st arriving at Vyshnivets by June 27. By July 1 the panzers had redirected toward Kyiv and the division was now facing the 57th and 75th Infantry Divisions of XXXXIV Army Corps, still at Vyshnivets. 37th Corps took significant casualties in this stand and by July 7 it had fallen back to the southeast, taking up positions southwest of Starokostiantyniv. On July 9 the 141st managed to hold off an attack near Liubar by some 50 tanks backed by motorized infantry. Two days later the Corps was ordered to attack in the direction of Molochki and the division managed to retake two villages. The Corps came under renewed German pressure on July 13, and the 141st was pulled back to second echelon.

By the end of July 14 the 37th Corps was north of the Southern Bug River near Khmilnyk. Elements of 17th Army and its IV Army Corps had now come up against 6th Army and 26th Army to its south and under this pressure by July 23 the 141st had been forced back to positions north of Lypovets. At this time the 6th was partly encircled, and as it attempted to break out the division, along with 16th Mechanized Corps, were left to cover the withdrawal. As of August 1 the Army had been reassigned to Southern Front, but this made no difference to its desperate situation, now completely encircled near Uman, along with most of 12th Army. By August 6 the pocket had been liquidated and the 141st was destroyed, apart from individuals and small groups that managed to filter through the German lines, although it was not written off until September 19. Commissar Kushchevskii took his own life to avoid capture, while both Tonkonogov and Bondarenko were taken prisoner and spent the remainder of the war in German camps. Bondarenko was discharged from the Red Army due to his health on his return to the USSR, while Tonkonogov was investigated, cleared, and attended the rifle division commander's advanced training course through 1946 before entering the educational establishment himself. He retired in February 1949 and died in Kyiv on May 15, 1985.

== 2nd Formation ==
A new 141st was formed at Kazan in the Volga Military District on December 26, 1941, but was very quickly moved to the Moscow Military District to complete its formation, which took several months. Its order of battle was very similar to that of the 1st formation:

- 687th Rifle Regiment
- 745th Rifle Regiment
- 796th Rifle Regiment
- 348th Artillery Regiment
- 190th Antitank Battalion
- 138th Reconnaissance Company
- 207th Sapper Battalion
- 201st Signal Battalion (later 210st, 655th Companies)
- 146th Medical/Sanitation Battalion
- 496th Chemical Defense (Anti-gas) Company
- 153rd Motor Transport Battalion
- 413th Field Bakery
- 874th Divisional Veterinary Hospital
- 1717th Field Postal Station
- 2158th Field Office of the State Bank

Col. Yakov Stepanovich Vorobyov was assigned to command the day the division began forming. This officer had been an instructor at the Frunze Military Academy in 1939, and in the past few months had served in several staff positions. In May the division was assigned to the 3rd Reserve Army of the Reserve of the Supreme High Command, and on May 14 Vorobyov left the division, being replaced by Col. Yakov Petrovich Tetushkin. Vorobyov went on to lead a pair of rifle corps and reached the rank of lieutenant general before the end of the war.

=== Case Blue ===
In June the division was reassigned to 6th Reserve Army, which became part of the active army as the new 6th Army on July 2. On June 23 Tetushkin had been ordered to take up defensive positions on the east bank of the Don River, near the mouth of the Voronezh. He led the division into combat on July 7 in an effort to cross the Don. Ten days later it was transferred to 40th Army, still in Voronezh Front. During the month it suffered 2,747 casualties, most heavily in the 796th Rifle Regiment. Another crossing effort began on August 8 and led to only limited results at considerable cost in casualties through to September 22. On September 30 Tetushkin left the division and was replaced by Lt. Col. Semyon Sergeevich Rassadnikov. This officer was in turn replaced on November 27 by Col. Nikolai Ivanovich Shpilev.

== Ostrogozhsk–Rossosh Offensive ==
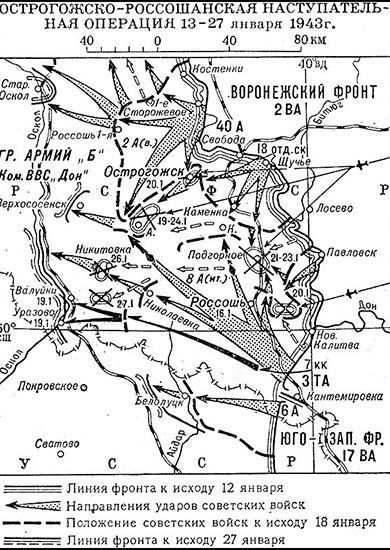
Ostrogozhsk–Rossosh Offensive, January 13-27, 1943

Just prior to the start of this offensive on January 13, 1943, Shpilev left the 141st and was replaced by Rassadnikov, who had been promoted to full colonel. In the planning for the operation Voronezh Front chose to launch three attacks against those parts of Hungarian 2nd Army and Italian 8th Army that made up the Ostrogozhsk–Rossosh grouping. 40th Army, now under command of Maj. Gen. K. S. Moskalenko, would form the northern group with five rifle divisions, a rifle brigade, a tank corps, and other reinforcements. The main force would attack from the bridgehead at Storozhevoe toward Boldyrevka, Krasnoe, and Alekseevka, linking up with forces of the Front's southern group and completing the encirclement. The Army's breakthrough sector was 10 km (6.2 mi) wide from Height 187 to Devitsa and the first echelon consisted of the 141st (less one regiment), the 25th Guards, 340th, and 107th Rifle Divisions, supported by three tank brigades. The third regiment, plus the division's training and machine gun battalions, would cover a 47-kilometre (29 mi) sector from Kremenchug to Anoshkino. Following the breakthrough the main body would bypass a strongpoint at 1st Storozhevoe to reach Mastyugino, helping to shield the Army's right flank. The 141st did not have any direct armor support.

In the afternoon of January 12 the divisions of Moskalenko's first echelon, following an artillery preparation of some one hour and backed by air attacks, sent in forward battalions to probe the Axis positions. In several instances they reached the forward trenches and beyond, disrupting the defense. Moskalenko correctly decided to take advantage of the successes of the 107th and 25th Guards by launching his main attack the next day instead of January 14 as originally planned. Overnight the first echelon moved up to its jumping-off positions. A powerful artillery bombardment began at dawn, targeting positions that had been uncovered by the forward battalions. 25th Guards encountered stubborn resistance and failed to make gains during the morning, but the success of the 340th on its left allowed it to advance during the afternoon. This, in turn, gave the 141st the opportunity to reach the gully 1,000 m (3,300 ft) southwest of 1st Storozhevoe in heavy fighting, making a total advance of up to 4 km (2.5 mi) through the day.

January 14 saw the commitment of 40th Army's second echelon to the attack while the first echelon reached the second Axis zone of defense. The overriding objective was to seize this before it could be occupied by reserves from the rear or retreating troops from the front. The 141st, assisted by two battalions of the 253rd Rifle Brigade brought up from second echelon, attacked to the north, getting into the flank and rear of the Hungarian 20th Infantry Division and forcing it to fall back. This, along with a push from the front by the remainder of the 253rd, led to the fall of 1st Storozhevoe, and the division continued on to Arkhangelskoe, an advance of 8 km (5.0 mi) for the day. By day's end the Army's offensive front was 50 km (31 mi) wide and up to 17km deep, but the second defense zone had not been taken from the march.

The objective for January 15 remained the second defense zone and ideally the third as well to complete the encirclement of the Axis grouping in cooperation with 3rd Tank Army and 18th Rifle Corps. The 141st and the 253rd Brigade, still on the right flank, advanced on Yablochnoe and Rossoshki, covering another 10 km (6.2 mi) and reaching a line from Maslov Log to Yablochnoe to Height 209. They faced retreating elements of Hungarian 20th, 6th, and 7th Infantry Divisions as well as remnants of the 429th Infantry Regiment of German 168th Infantry Division. The OKH was by now concerned that if this advance continued the Soviet force would get into the rear of German 2nd Army, which was still holding positions near Voronezh, and ordered a regiment of 57th Infantry Division to move by rail from the right bank of the Don all the way to Vyaznovatovka, 50 km (31 mi) to the west. By dusk, 40th Army had broken through the entire Axis defense on a frontage of 100 km (62 mi) and a depth of 20 km (12 mi) on the right flank and as much as 35 km (22 mi) in the center.

The most essential task now for the 141st and the 253rd Brigade was to form an external front for the imminent encirclement to prevent any rescue operation by 2nd Army. They continued advancing to the northwest on January 16, gaining another 3-5km against stiffening resistance; a further regiment had arrived from 68th Infantry Division. The forces they faced were now designated as "Group Siebert" after the commander of the 57th Infantry. This Group was ordered to retard the advance by incessant counterattacks, leading to very bitter fighting over the following days. On January 18 the main forces of 40th Army linked up with the 15th Tank Corps of 3rd Tank Army, completing the encirclement. At about the same time the 141st and 253rd reached the line Kostenki–Karaeshnik, firming up the external front. This was enhanced when Moskalenko directed the 25th Guards northward. 7th Cavalry Corps formed the southwestern sector of the external front. Meanwhile, 18th Corps had split the encircled force into two isolated pockets after a fighting advance of some 35 km (22 mi), and two Hungarian divisions were effectively destroyed.

During January 19-24 all three of the Front's shock groups took part in the destruction of the remaining encircled forces. By January 20 Moskalenko was already regrouping for the following offensive. His right flank forces (141st, 253rd Brigade, one regiment of 25th Guards) were on a line from Rossoshki to Ostryanka to Gorodishche and remained there, wearing down "Group Siebert" and preparing to jump off to the north.

== Voronezh-Kastornoye Offensive ==
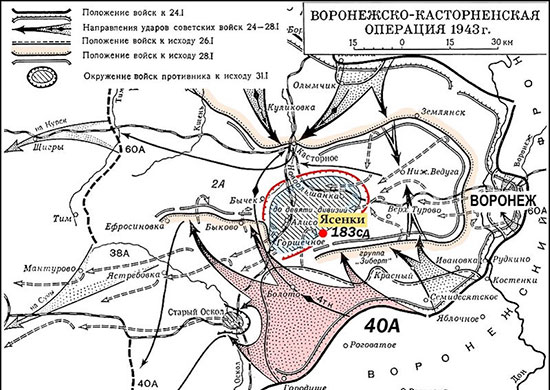
Voronezh–Kastornoye Offensive

The STAVKA released its plan for the new offensive on January 20. Voronezh Front would commit its 40th, 60th, and 38th Armies, while Bryansk Front's 13th Army would attack from the north in order to encircle and destroy German 2nd and what remained of Hungarian 2nd Armies. The shock groups of both 40th and 60th Armies were to attack from the jumping-off line held by 40th Army's right wing. An extensive regrouping took place until January 24, during which the 141st was transferred to Maj. Gen. I. D. Chernyakhovskii's 60th.

The new operation was to begin on January 24, with 60th Army kicking off 24 hours later. Apart from the encirclement and destruction of the Axis forces, both Voronezh and Kastornoye, under Axis occupation since the previous July, would be liberated, before developing the advance toward Kursk and Kharkiv. By this time the personnel strengths of the rifle divisions averaged between 5,000-6,000 men. 60th Army faced the German 75th, 88th, and two regiments of 323rd Infantry Divisions on a line from Olkhovatka to Uste. German 2nd Army had no operational reserves available, and was already pocketed on three sides. Chernyakhovskii selected a breakthrough sector 22km wide and had four divisions (141st, 322nd, 232nd, 303rd), 253rd Brigade, three tank brigades, and other units in his shock group. This sector, having been recently occupied, did not face the extensive fortifications on the rest of the Army's front. The 141st's share was 10 km (6.2 mi). The shock group was expected to advance 10-24km on the first day. Ultimately it was to link up with 38th Army to encircle the German Voronezh grouping. To cover the right flank of the group from Voronezh, the 141st was to attack toward Latnoe.

At 1000 hours on January 25, following an hour-long artillery preparation, the shock group attacked. The preparation did not yield the anticipated results and the defense was not fully suppressed. The fighting throughout the day was waged, for the most part, for the strongpoints along the forward edge of the defense; some of these were encircled by elements of the 232nd and 322nd during the afternoon but continued to hold out. As a result, the two divisions gained only 2-3km during the day. The 141st fought for the woods at Khmelevoi and the 253rd Brigade saw combat at Semidesyatskoye. Coordination between infantry and tank support was poor and led to significant tank losses. The offensive was renewed the next morning with heavy fighting for the holdout strongpoints, which were finally cleared as a result of close combat overnight. By dawn on the 27th the shock group had reached a line from Ivanovka to Medvezhinskii and although up to 1,500 German officers and soldiers had been killed and small groups were falling back to the northwest the shock group was still well short of its planned objectives.

Kastornoye was reached on January 28 and captured the next day, completing the encirclement of eight German and two Hungarian divisions. 38th and 40th Armies were assigned the task of clearing the pocket while the remaining Armies continued advancing westward. 60th Army was already attacking along its entire front, facing little effective resistance due to the unfolding disaster at Kastornoye. With the battle for Stalingrad coming to an end the STAVKA planned to redeploy Don Front to the Fatezh–Lgov area to form a new Central Front, and 60th Army was expected to secure this line. The initial objective was to move up to the Tim River by February 2 before advancing to take Kursk. At this time the Army consisted of three rifle divisions, two rifle, one tank, and one antitank "destruction" brigade. This plan would require crossing the logistical tail of 38th Army, and vice-versa, with potential for mutual confusion. On January 30 the 141st eliminated a small encircled force in the village of Khokhol, then concentrated at Nizhnee Turovo.

=== Lgov-Rylsk Offensive ===
Kursk was liberated at 1500 hours on February 8 after a battle with remnants of 82nd and 340th Infantry Divisions, plus elements of 4th Panzer Division advancing from Oryol. This success drove a 60km gap between German 2nd and 2nd Panzer Armies, and Voronezh Front reported the situation on February 16 as follows:

The 60th Army. The forces of the army were putting their units in order on the night of 16 February and preparing to continue their offensive; and, during the day, they resumed their attack toward L'gov.
The enemy offered stubborn resistance to the offensive by our units.
The Units of the army, while repelling counterattacks by subunits of enemy infantry, were continuing to fight along previous lines up to 1600 hours on 16 February.

As Central Front completed its concentration for offensive action Chernyakhovskii received the following orders:

1. The mission of the 60th Army. Destroy the opposing enemy and, after capturing the cities of L'gov, Ryl'sk, and Korenevo, reach the Arbuzova Station, Studenok, Ryl'sk, and Snagost' line by day's end on 17 February 1943. Have the following grouping of the army along the given line... in the center - Studenok, Ryl'sk (incl.), and Korenevo – a shock group consisting of the 322nd, 121st, and 141st Rifle Divisions, the 129th Rifle Brigade, and the 150th Tank Brigade, with the mission to attack toward Glukhov or Putivl'... Use the 129th Rifle Brigade, which is approaching late, to relieve the 141st Rifle Division on the given line, and withdraw the latter into reserve in the Ivanovskoe region.

These ambitious objectives would soon be tempered by the German counteroffensive near Kharkiv, which would begin on February 19.

Chernyakhovskii, without pausing, pushed west from Kursk on February 17 in an effort to take Lgov from the march. 2nd Army responded by shifting two regiments of the severely weakened 88th Infantry to defend it; 60th Army was halted on its eastern outskirts three days later. At 2130 hours on March 7 it was ordered to renew its offensive toward Rylsk and Glukhov, but this was contained before the first place by the 340th Infantry. To Chernyakhovskii's right a cavalry-rifle group of Central Front under Maj. Gen. V. V. Kriukov was also attempting to reach Glukhov when it was counterattacked by 2nd Army on March 14 and soon forced to retreat, uncovering 60th Army's flank. Chernyakhovskii had already diverted forces to deal with this possibility. In light of the deteriorating situation the STAVKA ordered a series of reorganizations: on March 19 a new Kursk Front was created, to command the 60th and 38th Armies; on March 24 this Front was liquidated in favor of Oryol Front consisting of 3rd and 61st Armies, with 60th moved to Central Front, which was under command of Col. Gen. K. K. Rokossovskii; and finally Oryol Front became a new Bryansk Front on March 28. By now the Kharkiv counteroffensive had been contained, the Kursk salient had been created, and the spring rasputitsa brought operations by both sides to a halt.

== Into Ukraine ==
During June the 141st was assigned to the newly reformed 30th Rifle Corps. 60th Army was on the right flank of Central Front, centered just east of Rylsk, still facing German 2nd Army. As the German offensive was expected at the base of the salient it was unlikely that Chernyakhovskii's troops would come under attack, but they fortified their positions strongly. Their sector stretched 92km, with 65th Army on the right and Voronezh Front's 38th Army on the left. Three rifle divisions (112th, 322nd, 141st) and two rifle brigades were in first echelon, with two divisions and one brigade in second. On the boundary with 38th Army the 14th Antitank Brigade and 130th Tank Brigade were stationed. Chernyakhovskii had his headquarters in Lgov. In the event the German offensive unfolded as expected and 60th Army saw little action.

Following the German offensive, most of Central Front took part in Operation Kutuzov against German 9th Army in the Oryol salient, but 60th Army was not involved. On August 26 the Front resumed the offensive against Army Group Center, striking at the 9th Army's right flank east of Karachev and near 2nd Army's center at Sevsk and east of Klintsy. The thrust at Sevsk scored a deep penetration and the German Army Group committed what reserves it had to a counterattack against it on August 29. This left an opening for 60th Army to make a sudden advance to Yesman, 40km behind 2nd Army's south flank. Rokossovskii now regrouped 13th Army and 2nd Tank Army from his right to his left flank to exploit this success. Over the following days 2nd Army retreated to the Desna River as Rokossovskii shifted his attention to the left (north) flank of 4th Panzer Army. On September 9 elements of Central Front crossed the Desna south of Novhorod-Siverskyi, and at Otsekin and between September 16 and 18 the 7th Guards Mechanized Corps aimed a two-pronged thrust northward across the Desna on either side of Chernihiv which collapsed the south flank of 2nd Army. The Front now continued its advance toward the Dniepr in the direction of Kyiv.

== Battles for Kyiv ==
On September 30 the commander of Voronezh Front's (as of October 20 1st Ukrainian) 38th Army, Maj. Gen. N. E. Chibisov, presented a plan to his Front commander, Army Gen. N. F. Vatutin, to capture Kyiv through a double envelopment by two rifle corps. This overly ambitious plan did create a pair of bridgeheads, but the attempt collapsed by October 3. At midnight on October 5 both the 60th and 13th Armies were transferred from Central Front. They were to join 38th Army in a further effort to take the city from the north.

On October 6 Vatutin assigned the following task to Chernyakhovskii, after assigning him the 17th Guards Rifle Corps and the 1st Guards Cavalry Corps: to clear the south bank of the Uzh River on October 6-7 and take a bridgehead on the south bank of the Teteriv River on a sector from Pilyava to Zatonsk. Overnight on October 7/8 the 1st Guards Cavalry would cross the Dniepr and the Teteriv, then launch a main attack to the southwest between the Zdvizh and Irpen Rivers, rolling up the German front. Chernyakhovskii decided to lead with 1st Guards Cavalry and 77th Rifle Corps toward Manuilsk and Litvinovka, with 24th and 30th Corps supporting with an attack toward Dymer. However, this plan did not hold up due to divergent axes of the various corps.

A German counteroffensive by elements of 7th Panzer, 399th Infantry, and 217th Infantry Divisions struck 60th Army heavily in the Hornostaipil area throughout October 6-7, after which the panzers were pulled back to reserve near Ivanivka. The next day Chernyakhovskii took the initiative at Hornostaipil, and mutual attacks also began south of Chornobil on October 9. By October 10, 60th Army had a large number of Dniepr crossings in operation, including a 30-ton capacity low-water bridge, four 30-ton ferries, 12 two to 12 ton ferries, and a landing crossing. On this date it was reported that the strength of the 141st was above average for the Army, with 6,183 personnel, 66 82mm and 16 120mm mortars, 11 76mm regimental and 20 76mm divisional guns, but only nine of its full allotment of 12 122mm howitzers.

At noon on October 11 the 60th and 38th Armies attacked simultaneously as German counterattacks struck back, including at 77th Corps along both banks of the Teteriv. A particularly strong attack by 7th and 8th Panzer south of the river reached the rear of 1st Guards Cavalry and cut it off from its crossings. The 30th and 24th Corps made only minor progress. Further efforts to gain traction over the next three days were also futile, with German tanks breaking through to the bridgehead at Lyutizh at one point. At 0150 hours on October 15 Vatutin signaled Chernyakhovskii as follows:

The army's forces are unsuccessful along almost all sectors and are standing in place. The chief reason for this is the dispersion of men and materiel...
If you do not adopt decisive measures for pushing the 1st Guards Cavalry Corps forward into the enemy's depth, then there is a danger that the cavalry corps will be transformed into a typical rifle formation...
I order:
1. To plan and organize the breakthrough of the enemy's front along a narrow sector, by creating an artillery density of no less than 150 tubes per kilometre of front.

In a further message, Vatutin stressed the significance of linking up the bridgeheads of 60th and 38th Armies.

The offensive was renewed on October 15 at 1400 hours. 60th Army made only minor gains, taking the village of Rovy. Only part of the Army attacked the next day, again with little success. Meanwhile, 1st Guards Cavalry was suffering significant losses trying to break out, and it was not until overnight on October 17/18 that its relief by 77th Corps began, and it began its transfer to 38th Army. 60th Army was now officially on the defensive. During October 18-23 it was involved in heavy fighting as German forces repeatedly tried to collapse the bridgehead over the Teteriv. At 2300 the next day the STAVKA released directive No. 30232, which set out the plan and date for a renewed offensive. Most importantly, the 3rd Guards Tank Army would be secretly removed from the bridgehead south of Kyiv at Velykyi Bukryn and shifted to the Lyutizh bridgehead.

A major regrouping took place during October 25-November 1, entirely at night or covered by smoke screens. By the latter date up to seven divisions faced 60th Army, quite a high concentration, although all were significantly under strength. The 141st was well below its own authorized strength, and its total personnel had decreased slightly to 5,970. The Army's task was much as previous, to attack in the direction of Rovy and Dymer with nine divisions and then advance between the Zdvizh and Irpin, covering the flank of 38th Army while the latter took Kyiv and it captured the railway from the city to Korosten. Subsequently, the offensive would be developed to the west. Six divisions and 59th Tank Regiment would be in first echelon; 30th Corps, with the armor, was designated to break through the German defense toward Dymer and take it by the end of the first day. By the end of the fourth day it was to reach the line Felitsyalova–Buda Babinskaya–Mykulichi–Kozintsy, where it would link up with 38th Army. The 141st would initially be in Corps second echelon. The Corps' breakthrough sector was 2.5km wide, and it would be supported by 105 guns and mortars per kilometre, with an opening bombardment of 40 minute duration.

The offensive opened at 0800 hours, with the infantry and armor attacking at 0840. 30th and 24th Corps, making the main attack, broke through the German defense on an 18km-wide front, capturing Fyodorovka, Rovy, Rostesno, Glebovo, and by day's end the northern approaches to Dymer. During the afternoon the 141st was committed from second echelon. The terrain was heavily forested, and the artillery began displacing forward to deal with strongpoints at close range. Five counterattacks by tanks and infantry were repelled, and 550 prisoners were taken by 60th and 38th Armies, but the first day objectives were not completely met, and Chernyakhovskii was constantly urged to increase his pace. The next day the two Corps attacked along their entire front, making an advance of 2km-6km, completing the capture of Dymer and several other settlements. 8th Panzer Division with five battalions of infantry attempted to restore the situation at Dymer, without success. In the rear, 3rd Guards Tanks moved to its jumping-off positions prior to being committed into the gap. On November 5, 30th Corps' attack developed successfully as part of a pursuit operation to the south, while 38th Army was fighting in the center and southwest of Kyiv. The following morning the city was cleared, and while the 141st made only a minor advance during the day, it was one of many units awarded a battle honor:

KIEV – ...141st Rifle Division (Col. Rassadnikov, Semyon Sergeevich)... The troops that participated in the liberation of Kiev, by order of the Supreme Commander-in-Chief of 6 November 1943 and a commendation in Moscow, are given a salute of 24 artillery salvoes by 324 guns.

=== Advance from Kyiv ===
During the day the main elements of 60th Army advanced up to 12km on the left flank. After clearing Kyiv 38th Army then advanced another 20km. 8th Panzer withdrew across the Zdvizh, and the Kyiv–Korosten railroad was cut. However, the Armies were beginning to face serious shortages of ammunition and fuel. Vatutin ordered the offensive to continue into western Ukraine with 60th Army directed to take bridgeheads over the Teteriv in the area of Radomyshl by the end of November 9. The general line of advance was to be to the west on the Korosten axis. By the end of November 8 the Army gained another 10 km (6.2 mi) against weak resistance. The next day the Teteriv was crossed and over 100 prisoners were taken, along with a large quantity of abandoned equipment. By this time 60th and 38th Armies were spread along an attack front of some 220km, and the German forces facing the 60th were retreating southwest toward Zhytomyr.

=== Kiev Strategic Defensive Operation ===
By November 12 the artillery was increasingly falling behind the advancing infantry and very little ammunition was at the front. The STAVKA was concerned that Vatutin was failing to consolidate captured ground and also noted increasing counterattacks. 38th Army was ordered to take up a static defense, while 60th moved a total of four divisions into Front reserve. During November 15 the 38th was struck by heavy counterattacks on several sectors, and lost some ground. Vatutin now ordered the 141st and 132nd Divisions, with the headquarters of 30th Corps, to be regrouped to the Zhytomyr area; this force was directed to take up positions on the north bank of the Teteriv, with the 141st on a sector from the eastern outskirts of the city to Levkiv.

Having seized the initiative the German forces made repeated attacks on November 16 east of Zhytomyr. 7th Panzer and 20th Motorized Divisions forced a crossing of the Teteriv and took Levkiv. 88th Infantry Division also crossed the river from the south and pushed the 218th Rifle Division back to Zhytomyr's outskirts. Vatutin now transferred the 218th's 23rd Rifle Corps to 60th Army, and Chernyakhovskii was given responsibility for defending Zhytomyr "to the last man." At 1800 hours the 30th Corps, now with a rifle brigade added, was assigned to another sector along the Teteriv, facing east and southeast. The following day saw limited German successes east of Zhytomyr, but 7th Panzer and 20th Motorized did retake Vatskov and reached the paved road from Zhytomyr to Kyiv. On November 18 a concentric attack was launched by these two divisions, as well as 8th Panzer from the north, which encircled 1st Guards Cavalry Corps, one regiment each of the 121st and 141st, and all of 218th Rifle Divisions within the city. By the end of the day the main bodies of the 121st and 141st had fallen back to the north, with the latter in the Veresy area. Overnight, Vatutin decided to order the breakout of the encircled force. Chernyakhovskii's plan was to lead with the cavalry to the north, with the rifle forces providing cover, while the remainder of 30th Corps made a relief attack from the north. This was largely successful, and during the day the Corps successfully defended its new positions south of Chernykhiv (the source of the Army commander's family name) while putting itself in order.

During November 20 the fighting focused on Radomyshl, but the next day, in aid of this push, 8th Panzer attacked toward Chernykhiv. In the evening the 1st Guards Army started to arrive from the Reserve of the Supreme High Command. Chernykhiv fell to 8th Panzer on November 22, but the German offensive was beginning to run out of steam and part of 60th Army's left flank forces attempted to gain jumping-off positions for a counterblow, but due to the losses to the rifle divisions and the continuing shortage of ammunition this largely failed. Vatutin now planned for an attack on November 25 by 60th and 1st Guards Armies from the Radomyshl area against the flank of the German forces threatening Brusyliv. The 60th was ordered to form a shock group to attack toward Kocheriv and Vodotyi, while also retaking Chernykhiv. 30th Corps kicked off a day early, and the 141st retook the latter on November 24 before being halted by 8th Panzer. The German efforts against Brusyliv were frustrated. However, the planned attack the next day did not take place, again largely due to ammunition supply. On the same day, Colonel Rassadnikov left the division, and was replaced the next day by Col. Aleksandr Yakovlevich Klimenko. This office had previously led the 3rd Guards Airborne and 299th Rifle Divisions, but had been removed from the latter command for a failure to carry out orders during Operation Polkovodets Rumyantsev.

The tempo of the fighting declined during the last days of November, as the German forces had shot their bolt, and the weather finally cleared enough to allow Soviet air support. Vatutin committed just the fresh 94th Rifle Corps to the fighting on November 27; by three days later the front had stabilized.

=== Zhitomir-Berdichev Offensive ===
The Front returned to the offensive on December 24 on both sides of the Zhytomyr–Kyiv highway. LIX Army Corps was attempting to hold Korosten against 13th and 60th Armies, which went over to the attack the following day. XXXXVIII Panzer Corps attempted to hem in and slow down the spearheads, with little effect. By December 29 LIX Corps was in full retreat to the west. By January 3, 1944, what remained of LIX Corps had been forced back to Horodnytsia on the pre-1939 border with Poland. Rivne and Lutsk were taken by February 2 and March 1, after which the front stabilized. By the latter date the 141st had been transferred, with 30th Corps, to 1st Guards Army, still in 1st Ukrainian Front. On March 19 the division was honored with the award of the Order of the Red Banner for its part in the liberation of Starokostiantyniv and several nearby towns during the Proskurov-Chernivtsi offensive. During the month it was moved to 52nd Rifle Corps in the Front reserve for rebuilding, and in April it returned to 30th Corps in 1st Guards Army. On April 29 Colonel Klimenko was dismissed from his command for having given up a bridgehead over the Dniestr River during a German counterattack. He was demoted to a battalion command in the 30th Rifle Division, but would lead the 302nd Rifle Division in the last weeks of the war. He was replaced by Col. Ivan Sergeevich Pakhomov, who had been serving as Klimenko's deputy commander since being relieved of command of the 132nd Division.

== Lvov-Sandomierz Offensive ==
At the start of this offensive on July 13 the 141st was still in the 30th Corps, along with the 30th Division. In the regrouping that preceded the offensive the Front command decided to widen the sectors held by the 1st Guards and 13th Armies in order to concentrate several other armies on attack sectors. 1st Guards took over the entire sector held by 38th Army and part of that held by 60th Army. When the offensive began the 1st Guards Army was deployed on a 118km-wide sector with 12 rifle divisions, of which five were in reserve. The Army was assigned a supporting role in the offensive, prepared to back up 38th Army to its north with its reserve divisions and the 4th Guards Tank Corps once that Army penetrated the German front. From July 14-20 the Front's northern armies successfully penetrated the deep German defenses on the Rava-Ruska and Lviv axes and with all available German reserves committed or already destroyed the Front prepared to expand the offensive on the direction of Drohobych. 1st Guards and 18th Armies had been fighting local actions during this first week in order to pin German forces in place.

1st Guards Army went over to the general offensive on the morning of July 21 and after dislodging rearguards advanced from 6-22km during the day. The Army's commander, Col. Gen. A. A. Grechko, was now ordered to develop an aggressive offensive and capture Stanislav by the end of July 24. From July 24-26 the Army continued to advance against stubborn resistance and took Stanislav on the 27th. In recognition of its part in this victory one regiment of the 141st received a battle honor:

STANISLAV... 745th Rifle Regiment (Lt. Colonel Kholmsky, Vladimir Nikolaevich)... By order of the Supreme High Command dated 27 July 1944, the troops who participated in the liberation of Stanislav are thanked and a salute was given in Moscow by 20 artillery salvoes from 224 guns.

On August 10, for their roles the 687th and 796th Rifle and the 348th Artillery Regiments would all receive the Order of the Red Banner. As the campaign continued 30th Corps captured the riverside city of Stryi on August 5, and the 207th Sapper Battalion (Major Belkov, Ivan Klementievich) was given its name as a battle honor. Finally, on August 6 and 7, respectively, the towns of Drohobych and Boryslav were taken, and on August 16 the division as a whole would receive the Order of Bogdan Khmelnitsky, 2nd Degree.

== Into the Carpathians ==
Also during August the 1st Guards Army, along with 30th Corps, was assigned to 4th Ukrainian Front, which was preparing to enter the Carpathian Mountains. This Front had been transferred from the Crimea following the liberation of Sevastopol to the foothills of the Carpathians in part because many of its formations, having fought in the Caucasus, were experienced in mountain warfare. 30th Corps at the start of September had the 141st, 30th, and 155th Rifle Divisions under command.

Beginning on September 9 the Front attempted to break through the positions of First Panzer Army into the Dukla Pass in the Laborec Highlands toward Uzhhorod. Only slow progress was made to begin with, but by the start of October the attack began to make headway, in part due to the removal of a panzer division, and on October 6 the pass was taken. By October 14 the Front was on the move again, slowly advancing south of Dukla Pass through German fortified positions; 18th Army was attempting to force some of the smaller passes farther east. In recognition of its efforts in the fighting through the mountains, on October 31 the 207th Sapper Battalion was further distinguished with the award of the Order of the Red Star.

== Into the Balkans ==
During October, 30th Corps had been transferred to 18th Army. In November, as the Red Army advanced on Budapest, the Corps was again transferred, now to 7th Guards Army in 2nd Ukrainian Front. Colonel Pakhomov was ordered to attend the Voroshilov Academy on November 13; after graduation he was made deputy commander of 94th Rifle Corps, but was hospitalized due to illness before the start of the Soviet invasion of Manchuria. Maj. Gen. Vasilii Nokolaevich Molozhaev took command the next day. He had previously led the 122nd and 271st Rifle Divisions and would lead the 141st until it was disbanded. On November 26 30th Corps was ordered to begin moving overnight on a route from Mezőkövesd to Jászberény via Heves in order to concentrate in the Tóalmás area by the morning on November 29. The Army was to break through the defense of the Axis Hatvan grouping with six divisions in first echelon and two more in second along a front from Heves to Aszód before developing the offensive in the direction of Verseg and Csővár in order to create conditions for the commitment of the 6th Guards Tank Army and the Pliyev Cavalry-Mechanized Group. By the end of the third day it was to reach the Danube with its left flank. The Army faced seven divisions of the German 6th and Hungarian 3rd Armies. The artillery of the three divisions of 30th Corps would contribute to the opening bombardment; along with other artillery assets the attack would be supported by 228 artillery pieces and mortars per kilometre of front.

At 1015 hours on December 5, after a brief but powerful artillery preparation, the 7th Guards, along with 53rd and 46th Armies, attacked and quickly broke through, advancing up to 8km and widening the breakthrough frontage to up to 18km. 46th Army, directly opposite Budapest and operating from the south to outflank the city to the west, had already begun forcing the Danube overnight. The breakthrough was so effective that 6th Guards Tanks was committed within hours, and fighting continued through the night. During December 8, 6th Guards Tanks and elements of 7th Guards were jointly attacking from the Vác area south along the river, with the aim of capturing Dunakeszi. The next day the Axis Budapest grouping was completely encircled from the east and north.

During December the 141st was again reassigned, now to the 27th Guards Rifle Corps in 7th Guards Army. It would remain under these commands for the duration of the war. The offensive on Budapest itself began at 1045 hours on December 5 following an artillery preparation which suppressed the German firing points and by the end of December 9 the 7th Guards had reached a line from Nandor to Borsosberenke to the left bank of the Danube in the Verőce area. On January 6, 1945, the 796th Rifle Regiment was awarded the Order of Bogdan Khmelnitsky, 2nd Degree, for an assault crossing of the Danube.

On January 1 German Army Group South began an offensive on the Komárno axis in an effort to relieve the forces trapped in Budapest. IV SS Panzer Corps made a fast start through hilly terrain, but was never able to break through in the face of Soviet infantry and antitank guns. By January 5 the 6th Guards Tanks had reached positions north of the Danube, and the next day IV SS Panzer ran into a solid front, after which 7th Guards and 6th Guards Tanks counterattacked, threatening to get into its rear, and forced it to pull back. The city would finally fall on February 13.

=== Into Czechoslovakia ===
Before the end of the siege of Budapest the 7th Guards Army was advancing towards Slovakia. In late April, 2nd Ukrainian Front continued to clear German forces from central Austria and southern Bohemia. On April 22 the commander of 27th Guards Corps, Maj. Gen. Evgenii Stepanovich Alekhin, was severely wounded in a sudden enemy air strike while directing combat in the fighting positions of his troops, in the vicinity of Mikulov. Alekhin was carried to an aid station of the 375th Rifle Division but died there of his wounds at 1800 hours. His adjutant, Petchenko, and his driver, Koshman, were killed in the same attack.

== Postwar ==
When the shooting stopped the men and women of the division shared the full title of 141st Rifle, Kiev, Order of the Red Banner, Order of Bogdan Khmelnitsky Division. (Russian: 141-я стрелковая Киевская Краснознамённая, ордена Богдана Хмельницкого дивизия.) In a final series of awards on May 17 the 745th Rifle Regiment received the Order of the Red Banner and the 687th Regiment got the Order of Suvorov, 3rd Degree, for their roles in the battles for Trnava, Hlohovec, and other towns in Slovakia; the 796th Regiment also got the Order of Suvorov, 3rd Degree, for helping to take Korneuburg and Floridsdorf in Austria; and the 201st Signal Battalion was awarded the Order of Alexander Nevsky for the fighting for Komárno and other places in Slovakia.

According to STAVKA Order No. 11096 of May 29, parts 5 and 8, 7th Guards Army was to be transferred to the Central Group of Forces, but the 141st was listed as one of those divisions to be "disbanded in place". In accordance to this directive the division was disbanded in July.
