= Poliske (former village) =

Poliske Поліське
- Former village
- Location of Poliske in Zhytomyr Oblast
- Coordinates: 51°05′14″N 29°12′14″E
- Country: Ukraine
- Oblast: Zhytomyr Oblast
- Raion: Narodychi (to 2020); Korosten (since 2020)
- Exclusion Zone: Zone of Absolute (Mandatory) Resettlement
- Liquidated: 12 February 1991

Population
  - Total: 0
- Time zone: UTC+2 (EET)
  - Summer (DST): UTC+3 (EEST)

Poliske (Ukrainian: Поліське) was a village in Korosten Raion, Zhytomyr Oblast, northern Ukraine. The village was evacuated in 1990 following the aftermath of the 1986 Chernobyl disaster.

Poliske is located within the "Zone of Absolute (Mandatory) Resettlement" of the Chernobyl Exclusion Zone, which is an officially designated exclusion area around the site of the disaster.

== History ==
In 1981, the village's population was 150. Administratively, it belonged to Velyki Klishchi Village Council, a local government area in the raion. Following the aftermath of the Chernobyl disaster, the village was evacuated in 1990. At the time, 46 families resided in the village. They were all relocated to the village of Lysivka in the oblast's Popilnia Raion (Today Zhytomyr Raion) with the support of the government.

On 28 December 1990, the Zhytomyr Oblast Council voted to remove Poliske from the register of populated places. The process was finalized when the Verkhovna Rada of the Ukrainian Soviet Socialist Republic published the law on 12 February 1991.
