= Sukharivka =

- Village
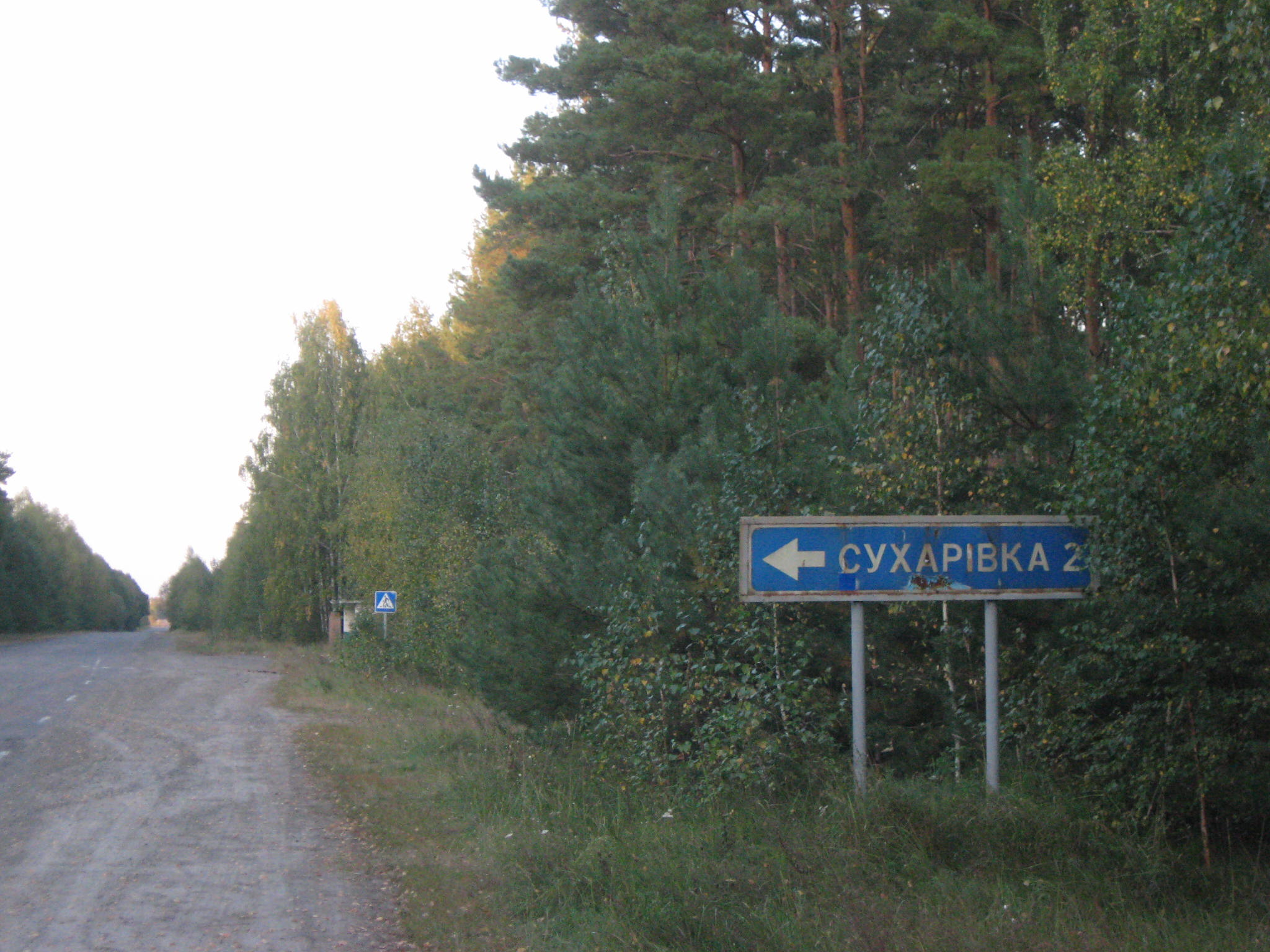

- Location within Zhytomyr Oblast Location within Ukraine
- Country: Ukraine
- Oblast: Zhytomyr Oblast
- Raion: Korosten
- Elevation: 159 m (522 ft)
- Population: 196

Sukharivka is a Ukrainian village in the Korosten Raion (district) of Zhytomyr Oblast (province).

Sukharivka was previously located in Narodychi Raion until was abolished on 18 July 2020 as part of the administrative reform of Ukraine, which reduced the number of raions of Zhytomyr Oblast to four. The area of Narodychi Raion was merged into Korosten Raion.
