= Kvartsytne =

Rural locality in Zhytomyr Oblast, Ukraine

Kvartsytne Кварцитне
- Rural settlement
- Interactive map of Kvartsytne
- Location within Zhytomyr Oblast Location within Ukraine
- Coordinates: 51.3892°N 28.8625°E
- Country: Ukraine
- Oblast: Zhytomyr Oblast
- Raion: Korosten Raion
- Hromada: Hladkovychi rural hromada

Population (2022)
  - Total: 2,326
- Time zone: UTC+2 (EET)
  - Summer (DST): UTC+3 (EEST)
- KATOTTH: UA18060030020056514

Kvartsytne (Ukrainian: Кварцитне), formerly known as Pershotravneve (Ukrainian: Першотравневе) is a rural settlement in Korosten Raion, Zhytomyr Oblast, Ukraine. Population: 2,326 (2022 estimate) In 2011, the population was 2,620.

== History ==
The settlement was heavily affected by the Chernobyl disaster in 1986.

Until 26 January 2024, Pershotravneve was designated urban-type settlement. On this day, a new law entered into force which abolished this status, and Pershotravneve became a rural settlement.

In September 2024, Pershotravneve was renamed to Kvartsytne by the Verkhovna Rada.

== Geography ==
The settlement is located several miles north of the small city of Ovruch, where the Ovruch air base is located, at the edge of the forests south of Belarus, between the railroad tracks and highway M-21/P-31 towards the border.
