= Severivka =

Severivka Северівка
- Former village
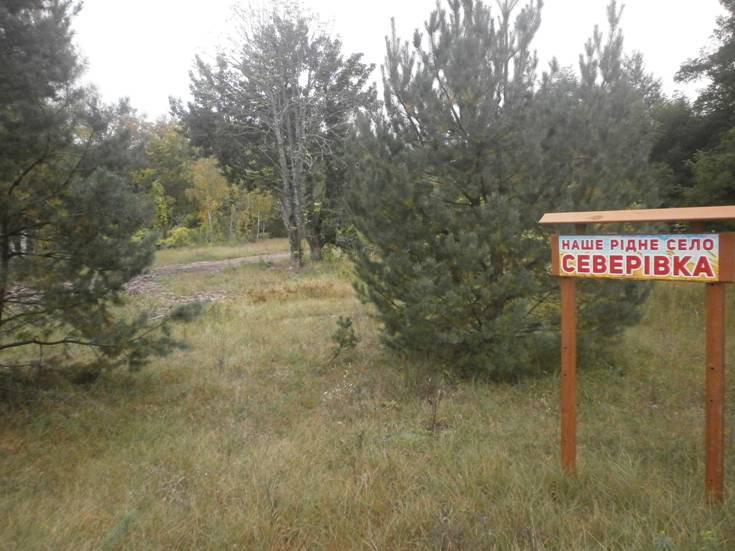
- The site of one of the buried houses of Severivka

- Location of Severivka in Ukraine
- Coordinates: 51°06′16″N 29°04′17″E
- Country: Ukraine
- Oblast: Zhytomyr Oblast
- Raion: Korosten Raion
- Elevation: 123 m (404 ft)

Population (2020)
  - Total: 0

Severivka (Ukrainian: Северівка) is a former village in Korosten Raion, Zhytomyr Oblast, northern Ukraine. It was subordinated to the Lyubar village council. Due to radioactive contamination as a result of the 1986 Chernobyl disaster, all of its residents were evicted.

== History ==
In 1981, 80 people lived in Severovka.

On 27 June 1996, Severivka was deregistered by the Zhytomyr Oblast Council. Almost all the buildings in the village are collapsed now, there are no residents. The average radiation background in the Severivka is about 50-60 usv/hr. On 2 May 2018, a memorial plaque "Severivka is our native village" was installed by former villagers.

Severivka was previously located in Narodychi Raion until was abolished on 18 July 2020 as part of the administrative reform of Ukraine, which reduced the number of raions of Zhytomyr Oblast to four. The area of Narodychi Raion was merged into Korosten Raion.

== See also ==
- Chernobyl Exclusion Zone
