= Velyki Klishchi =

Velyki Klishchi Великі Кліщі
- Former village
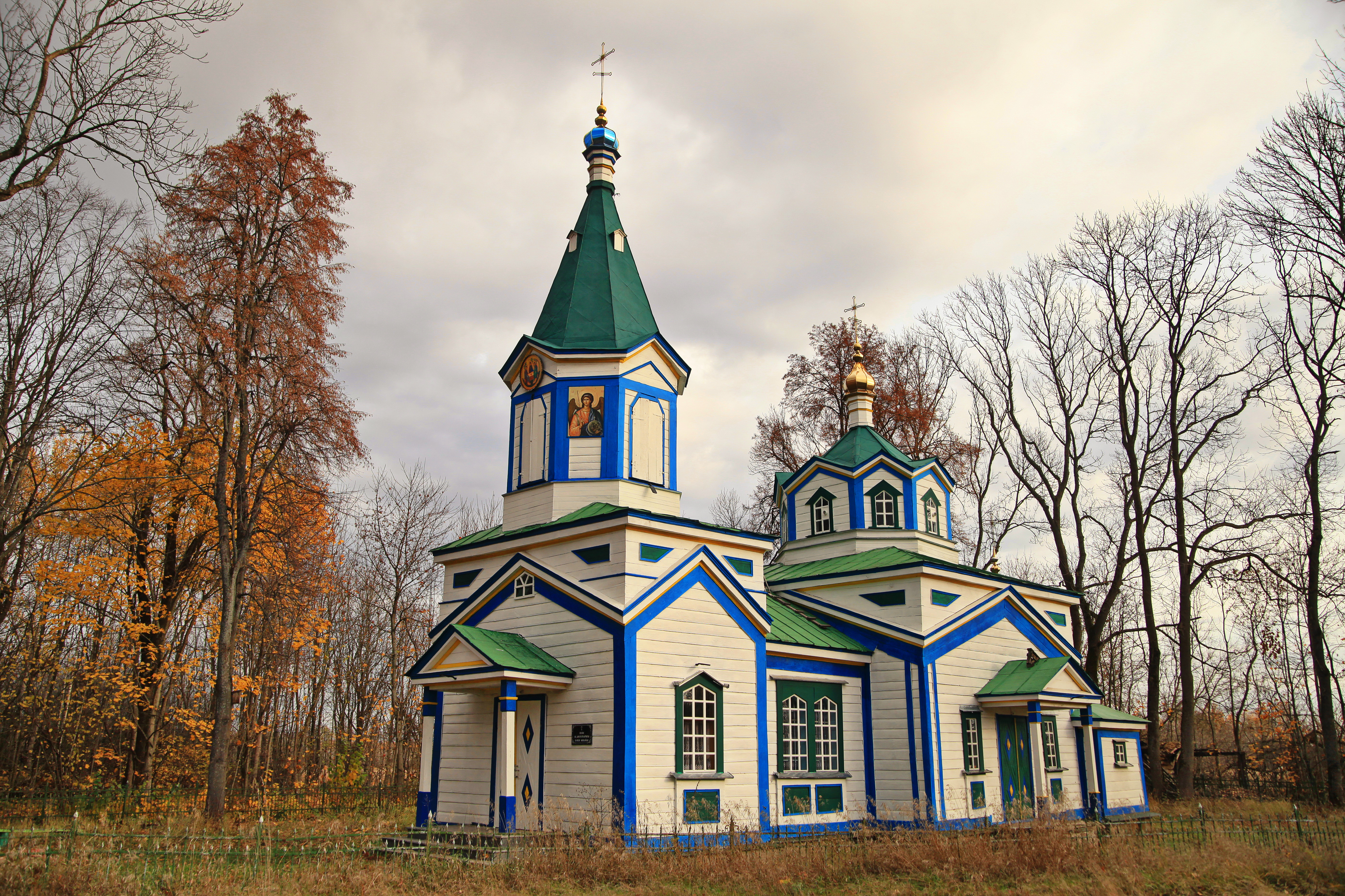
- St. Michael the Archangel Church in the former village

- Location of Velyki Klishchi in Zhytomyr Oblast
- Coordinates: 51°04′04″N 29°10′31″E
- Country: Ukraine
- Oblast: Zhytomyr Oblast
- Raion: Narodychi (to 2020); Korosten (since 2020)
- Exclusion Zone: Zone of Absolute (Mandatory) Resettlement
- Established: end of 17th century
- Liquidated: 12 February 1991

Population (2015)
  - Total: 0
- Time zone: UTC+2 (EET)
  - Summer (DST): UTC+3 (EEST)

Velyki Klishchi (Ukrainian: Великі Кліщі; Russian: Великие Клещи) is a former village (a selo) in Korosten Raion, Zhytomyr Oblast, northern Ukraine. The village was evacuated in 1990 following the aftermath of the 1986 Chernobyl disaster.

It is located within the "Zone of Absolute (Mandatory) Resettlement" of the Chernobyl Exclusion Zone, which is an officially designated exclusion area around the site of the disaster. A church by the name of St. Michael is located in the village.

== History ==
The settlement was first mentioned at the end of the 17th century. In 1972, its population was 786, while in 1981, it was 850. The village was the administrative center of the Velyki Klishchi Village Council, a local government area in the raion. Following the aftermath of the Chernobyl disaster, the village was evacuated in 1990. At the time, 250 families resided in the village. They were all relocated to the village of Lysivka in the oblast's Popilnia Raion with the support of the government.

On 28 December 1990, the Zhytomyr Oblast Council voted to remove Velyki Klishchi and the neighboring village of Poliske from the register of populated places. The process was finalized when the Verkhovna Rada of the Ukrainian Soviet Socialist Republic published the law on 12 February 1991.

Only one resident of the village remained after the evacuation (a samosel), a woman who died at the age of 62 due to the effects of radiation from the disaster.
