= Davydky =

Davydky may refer to two villages in Zhytomyr Oblast, Ukraine:

- Davydky, Horshchyk rural hromada, Korosten Raion
- Davydky, Narodychi settlement hromada, Korosten Raion
