= Selezivka =

Selezivka Селезівка
- Village
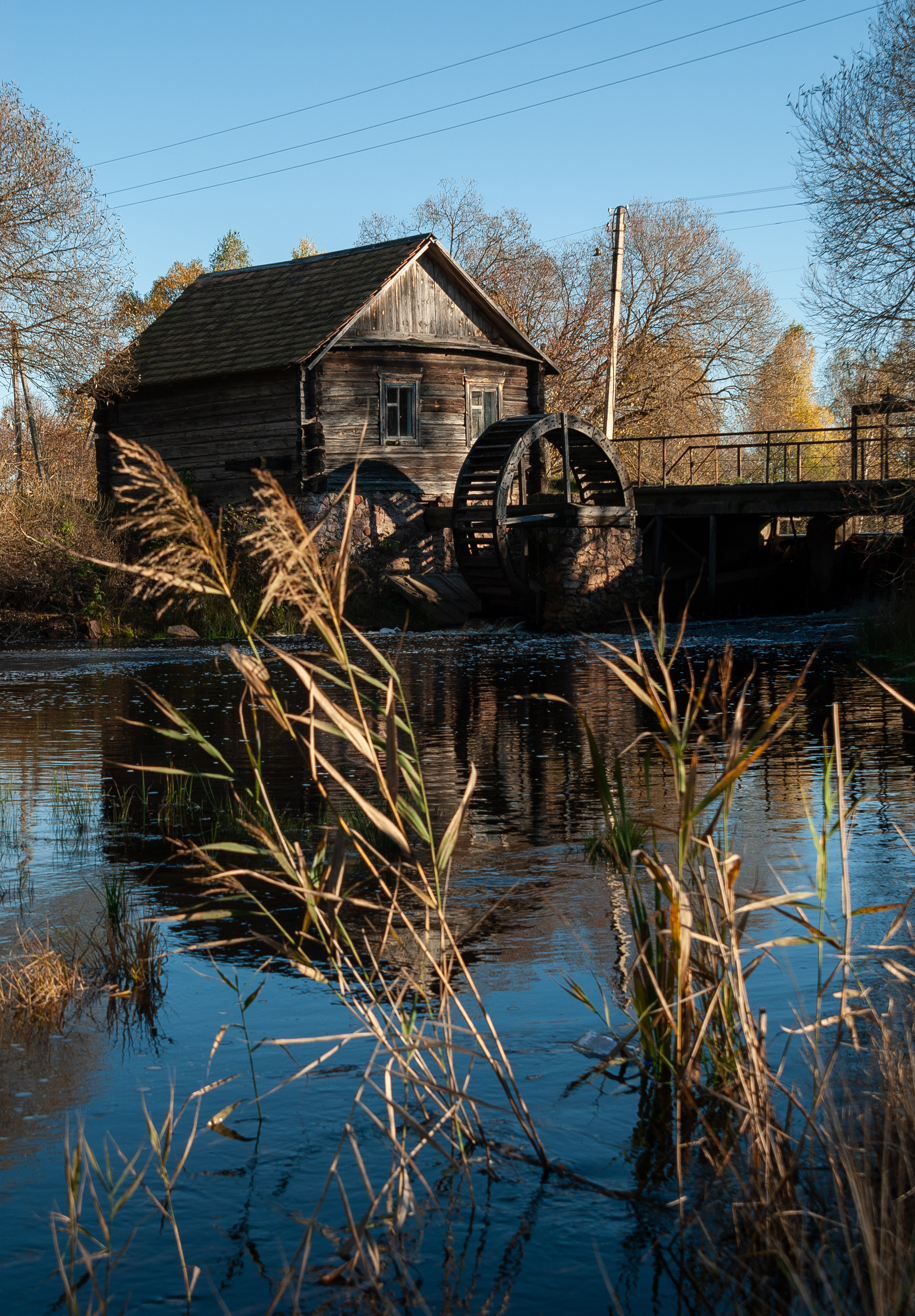
- Interactive map of Selezivka
- Coordinates: 51°31′57″N 28°06′34″E
- Country: Ukraine
- Oblast: Zhytomyr Oblast
- Raion: Korosten Raion
- Settled: 1039

Area
  - Total: 0.897 km^{2} (0.346 sq mi)
- Elevation: 152 m (499 ft)

Population
  - Total: 249

Selezivka (Ukrainian: Селезівка) is a village in the Korosten Raion of the Zhytomyr Oblast in Ukraine.

== History ==
According to the testimony of the older villagers, the farm that existed on the site of the village of Selezivka was called Vorobyova Korchma.

As of 2019, the villagers are engaged in traditional Ukrainian beekeeping crafts.

The village was temporarily captured in 2022 by Russian armed forces during their occupation of Zhytomyr Oblast.
