= Chervonosilka, Korosten Raion =

Populated place in Zhytomyr Oblast, Ukrain

Coordinates: 51°34′42″N 28°17′44″E

Chernovosilka (Ukrainian: Червоносілка) is a village in the Korosten Raion of Zhytomyr Oblast, Ukraine. The population is 5 people.

The surrounding areas were temporarily occupied by Russian forces in 2022.
