= Staseva =

Coordinates: 50°46′19″N 29°32′17″E

Staseva (Ukrainian: Стасева) is a village in Zhytomyr Oblast, Ukraine. It is a part of the Malyn city hromada. The population was 2001 in 26.

The historical date of formation is considered to be 1537.

== Overview ==
=== Geography ===
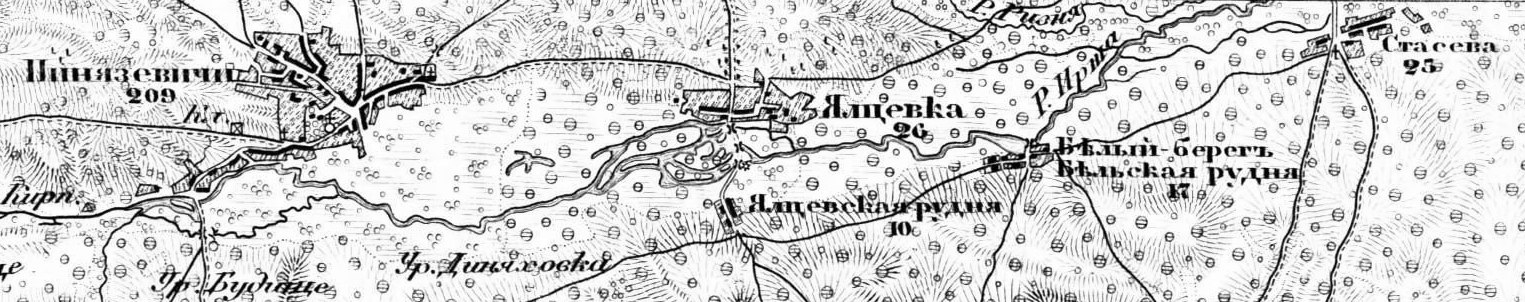
1868 Map including Staseva

The elevation is 226 meters. In 2001, 26 people were reportedly living in the village. The village was part of the Malyn Raion until 2020, when it was merged into the Korosten Raion.

=== History ===
The historical date of formation is considered to be 1537. It used to be part of the Russian empire.

The village was temporarily occupied during the Russian Invasion of Ukraine.
