= Radcha, Zhytomyr Oblast =

Radcha Радча
- Village
- Radcha shown within Ukraine Radcha (Zhytomyr Oblast)
- Coordinates: 51°21′9″N 29°16′57″E
- Country: Ukraine
- Oblast: Zhytomyr Oblast
- Raion: Korosten Raion
- Hromada: Narodychi settlement hromada
- Elevation: 146 m (479 ft)

Population (2001 census)
  - Total: 265
- Time zone: UTC+2 (EET)
  - Summer (DST): UTC+3 (EEST)
- Postal code: 11411
- Area code: +380 4140

Radcha (Ukrainian: Радча) is a rural village in Narodychi settlement hromada, Korosten Raion, Zhytomyr Oblast, Ukraine. The population was 265 at the 2001 Ukrainian Census.

== History ==
In 1960 it was registered as a settlement of Davydkivsky village council. The village used to have an anti-tuberculosis sanatorium "Radcha".

On February 24, 2022, the village was occupied by Russian troops. It was liberated on April 3.
