= Hunychi =

- Village
- Location within Zhytomyr Oblast Location within Ukraine
- Coordinates: 51°15′51″N 28°55′21″E
- Country: Ukraine
- Oblast: Zhytomyr Oblast
- Raion: Korosten Raion
- Area: 1.641 km^{2} (0.634 sq mi)
- Elevation: 147 m (482 ft)
- Population (2001): 429
  - Density: 263.43/km^{2} (682.3/sq mi)
- Postal code: 11160
- Area code: +380 4148

Hunychi is a Ukrainian village in the Korosten Raion (district) of Zhytomyr Oblast (province).
