= Kupech =

- Village
- Ukrainian: Купеч
- Location of Kupech, Ukraine Kupech (Ukraine)
- Coordinates: 50°59′46″N 28°47′05″E
- Country: Ukraine
- Oblast: Zhytomyr Oblast
- Raion: Korosten Raion
- Founded: 1834
- Area: 1.504 km^{2} (0.581 sq mi)
- Elevation: 172 m (564 ft)
- Population (2001): 176
  - Density: 117/km^{2} (303/sq mi)
- Postal code: 11540
- Area code: +380 4142

Kupech (Ukrainian: Купеч) is a Ukrainian village in the Korosten Raion (district) of Zhytomyr Oblast (province). It is located between the villages of Khodaky to the east and Bekhy to the west.
