= Zhytomyr attacks (2022–present) =

Missile strikes in Ukraine

- Part of the Russian invasion of Ukraine
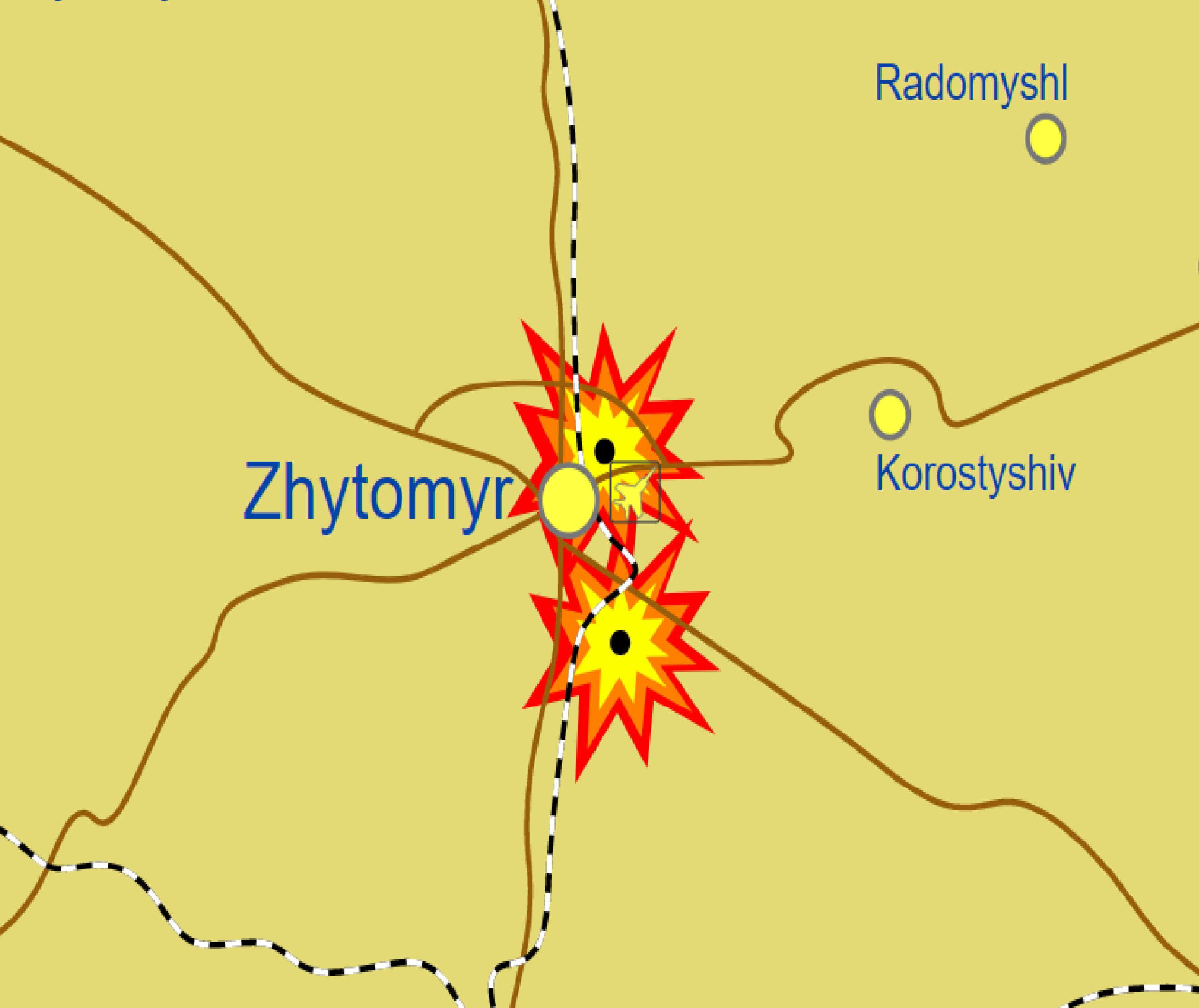
- 2022 Zhytomyr attacks
| Date | 24 February 2022 — present |
| Location | Zhytomyr, Zhytomyr Oblast, Ukraine |

Belligerents
| Ukraine | Russia |

Units involved
| Armed Forces of Ukraine: Territorial Defense Forces | Russian Armed Forces |

Casualties and losses
| 39 killed: 25 military; 14 civilians; 330 civilians wounded 33 objects of infrastructure destroyed | None |

Missile attacks on Zhytomyr began on 24 February 2022 as part of the Russian invasion of Ukraine.

== 2022 strikes ==
=== February ===
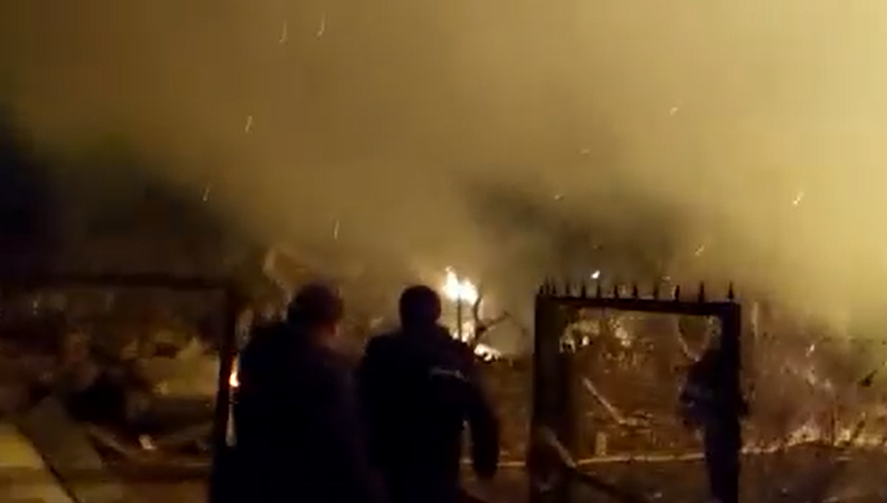
Zhytomyr Airport attack, 27 February 2022

On 24 February, at 5:40 a.m., Ozerne Air Base in the suburbs was shelled.

On 27 February, Russian occupation forces used 9K720 Iskander missiles in Belarus to strike the Zhytomyr civilian airport.

The Zhytomyr Airport is situated around 150 kilometres (93 mi) from the capital city of Ukraine — Kyiv — near the city of Zhytomyr in Zhytomyr Oblast. On 27 February 2022, it was reported that the Russian armed forces used 9K720 Iskander missile systems that were located in Belarus.

=== March ===
Late in the evening of 1 March, Russian troops hit a residential sector of the city. The city hospital and about ten residential buildings on Shukhevych street were damaged. Bombs were dropped on the city. As a result, at least two civilian Ukrainians were killed and three were injured.

On 2 March, shells hit the regional perinatal center and some private houses.

On 4 March, rockets hit the 25th Zhytomyr school, destroying half of the school. In the evening, the "Ozerne and Zhytomyr Armored Plant" came under fire; two people were injured.

In an air assault on 8 March, a dormitory was hit and the Isovat insulation factory was damaged.

On 9 March, the outskirts of the city (Ozerne district) came under fire.

On 25 March, a military facility was shelled by Russian forces.

=== June ===
On 25 June, 24 Russian missiles hit several military bases in and around Zhytomyr, these missiles were reportedly launched by Russian forces in Belarus.

=== August ===
On 16 August, the Zhytomyr region again came under shelling, two explosions were reported at a military airport; The runway, as well as repair equipment, were damaged during the attack. According to the governor of the Zhytomyr Oblast, Vitaliy Bunechko, the missiles that hit the airport were launched from Belarusian territory.

=== October ===
On 10 October, during the series of Russian strikes against Ukrainian energy infrastructure, two missiles were launched against Zhytomyr, one was reportedly shot down, while the other hit critical energy infrastructure, which led to some parts of the region to have blackouts.

=== November ===
On 15 November, during an air raid in Zhytomyr, explosions were reported at key energy infrastructure in the city, which caused blackouts and partial lack of water in the city.

=== December ===
On 16 December, two Russian missiles were launched at Zhytomyr. The energy infrastructure in the city was reportedly hit.

== 2023 strikes ==
Strikes also took place in 2023.

== 2024 strikes ==
Strikes also took place in 2024.

== See also ==
- Russian occupation of Zhytomyr Oblast
