= Khodaky, Korosten Raion =

Coordinates: 50°58′41″N 28°48′24″E

Khodaky
- Village
- Ukrainian: Ходаки
- Interactive map of Khodaky
- Country: Ukraine
- Oblast: Zhytomyr Oblast
- Raion: Korosten Raion
- Population: 270

Khodaky (Ukrainian: Ходаки) is a Ukrainian village in the Korosten Raion (district) of Zhytomyr Oblast (province). It is located between the villages of Horbachi to the east and Kupech to the west. Khodaky has 270 residents. Khodaky also has an elevation of 179 metres, or 587 feet.
