= Verkhnia Rudnia =

Coordinates: 51°33′38″N 28°31′23″E

Verkhnia Rudnia (Ukrainian: Верхня Рудня) is a village in Ovruch urban hromada, Korosten Raion, Zhytomyr Oblast, Ukraine. It had a population of 31 people as of the 2001 Ukrainian census.

In 1906 it was a village in Pokalivska volost, Ovruch raion, Volyn governorate during the Russian empire. The village was occupied by Russian forces in the start of 2022, before being recaptured by Ukraine later.
