= Narodychi =

Rural locality in Zhytomyr Oblast, Ukraine

Narodychi Народичі
- Rural settlement
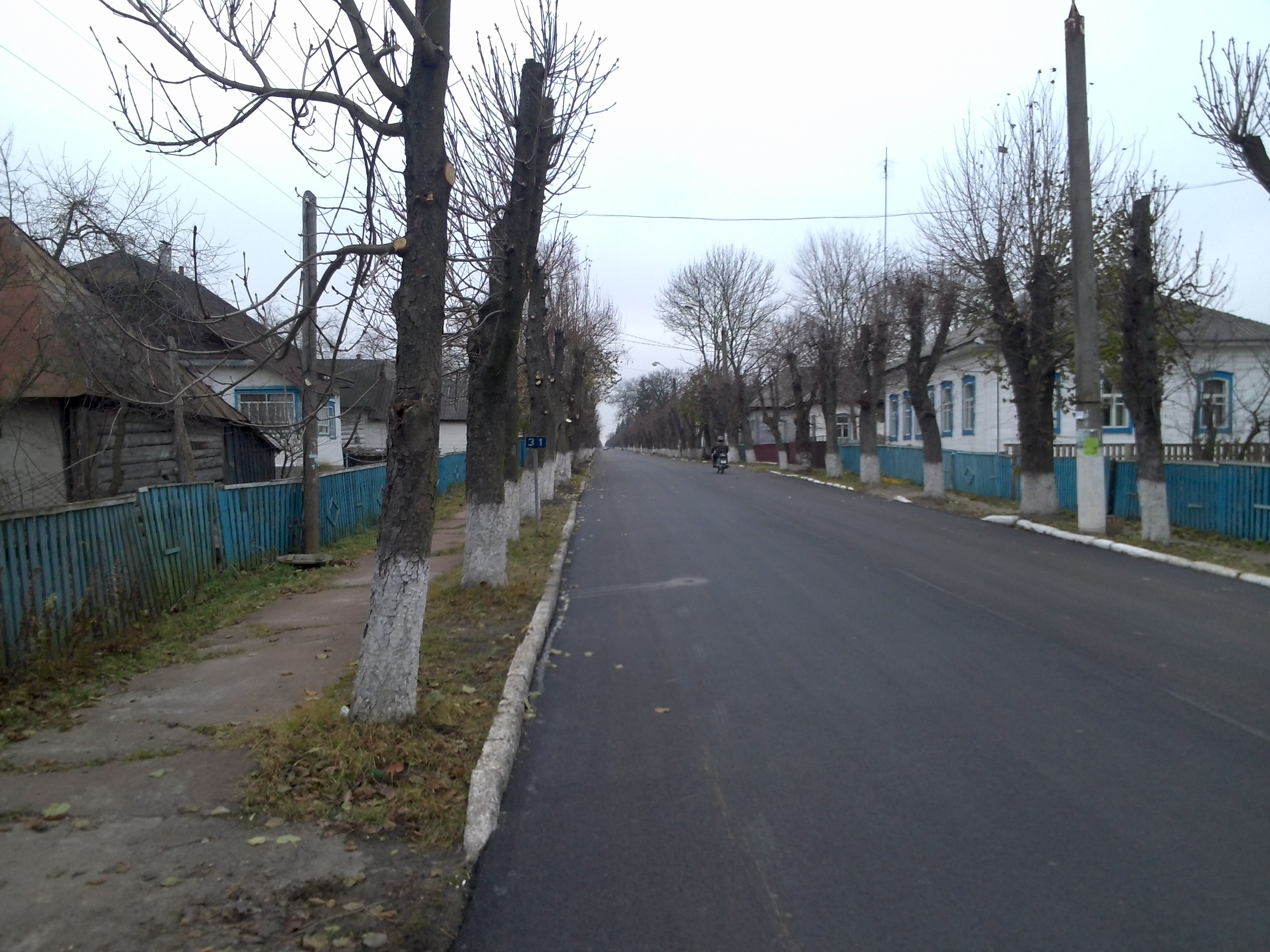
- Central road

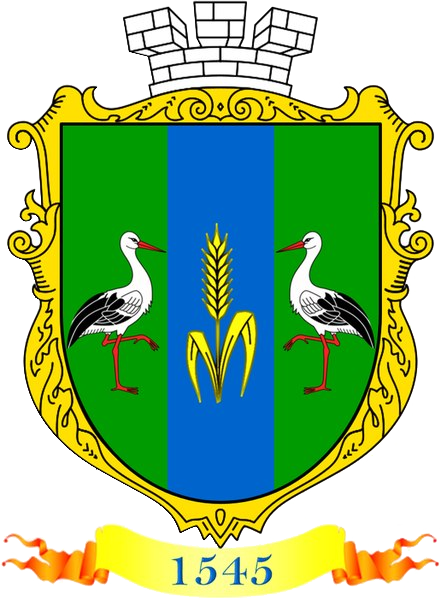
- Coat of arms

- Location in Ukraine Narodychi (Zhytomyr Oblast)
- Coordinates: 51°12′10″N 29°4′39″E
- Country: Ukraine
- Oblast: Zhytomyr Oblast
- Raion: Korosten Raion

Area
  - Total: 5.23 km^{2} (2.02 sq mi)

Population (2022)
  - Total: 2,907
  - Density: 556/km^{2} (1,440/sq mi)
- Time zone: UTC+2 (EET)
  - Summer (DST): UTC+3 (EEST)

Narodychi (Ukrainian: Народичі) is a rural settlement in Korosten Raion, Zhytomyr Oblast, northern Ukraine. It was the administrative center of the former Narodychi Raion, and after the reform in 2020, the city became part of the Korosten Raion. It lies on the northern side of the Uzh River, 134 kilometres northwest of Kyiv. Population: 2,907 (2022 estimate)

== History ==
Narodytchi is located in the historic region of Polesia. Narodytchi was first mentioned in historical records in 1545.

During the 16th through 18th centuries, Narodichi belonged to the Kiev Province within the Polish-Lithuanian Commonwealth. Following the Second Partition of Poland in 1793, it passed to the Russian Empire, eventually becoming a Jewish shtetl.

According to the census of 1897, the total population is 4576 including 2054 Jewish inhabitants.

Nazi Germany occupied the area from 1941 to November 1943. Between August and November 1941, German forces murdered most of the town’s Jewish population, including about 300 children.

Narodichi attained the status of an urban-type settlement in 1958.

The Chernobyl disaster in 1986 had an extremely negative impact on all spheres of life in Narodychi. According to the Cabinet of Ministers of Ukraine dated July 23, 1991 Narodychi was evacuated and was one of the worst hit areas by the radiation, affecting some 93,000 people in the Narodychi town and surrounding raion, 20,000 of which were children. This led to the cessation of all industrial enterprises and one of two secondary schools were closed. On the streets of Narodichi are many abandoned houses and dilapidated buildings of educational and medical institutions, etc. Vital functions of the town however are gradually being established.

Russian troops occupied parts of the Narodychi settlement hromada from the 24 February Russian invasion of Ukraine to 4 April 2022.

Until 26 January 2024, Narodychi was designated urban-type settlement. On this day, a new law entered into force which abolished this status, and Narodychi became a rural settlement.

== Geography ==
It lies on the northern side of the Uzh River, 107 km northeast of Zhytomyr and 134 km northwest of Kyiv.

== Economy ==
Narodychi contains several industrial companies, including a bakery, a plant for the production of technical tapes (CP "tape") and a joint Bulgarian-Ukrainian producer of sewing accessories Ltd. ("TWI TKF"), although agriculture is practiced by most of the people, with extensive fields in the town and suburbs. The town has gymnasium, kindergarten, children's art house and central regional hospital.

== See also ==
- Chernobyl Exclusion Zone
