= Hrozyne =

Rural locality in Zhytomyr Oblast, Ukraine

Hrozyne Грозине
- Village
- Location of Hrozyne in Ukraine Hrozyne (Ukraine)
- Coordinates: 50°57′32″N 28°43′50″E
- Country: Ukraine
- Oblast: Zhytomyr Oblast
- Raion: Korosten
- Area: 0.956 km^{2} (0.369 sq mi)
- Elevation: 170 m (560 ft)
- Population: 1,225
  - Density: 1,280/km^{2} (3,320/sq mi)
- Time zone: UTC+2 (EET)
  - Summer (DST): UTC+3 (EEST)
- Postal code: 11542
- Area code: +380 4142

Hrozyne (Ukrainian: Грозине) is a Ukrainian village in Korosten Raion (district) of Zhytomyr Oblast (province). Agricultural Institute of Polesia is located in the village.
