= Kocheriv =

Kocheriv Кочерів
- Village
- Location of Kocheriv within Zhytomyr Oblast Kocheriv (Ukraine)
- Coordinates: 50°21′18″N 29°20′45″E
- Country: Ukraine
- Oblast: Zhytomyr Oblast
- Raion: Zhytomyr Raion
- Established: 1880

Area
  - Total: 3.172 km^{2} (1.225 sq mi)
- Elevation: 170 m (560 ft)

Population
  - Total: 815
  - Density: 25,694/km^{2} (66,550/sq mi)
- Zip: 12264
- Telephone Code: +380 4132

Kocheriv (Ukrainian: Кочерів) is a village in Zhytomyr Raion, Zhytomyr Oblast, Ukraine. It has a population of 815.

== Geography ==
The elevation is 170 meters. The village is located close to the regional capital Zhytomyr and the nearby village of Kvitneve.

== History ==
The village was temporarily captured by Russian forces as part of its occupation of the Zhytomyr Oblast and they spilled over from Kyiv Oblast, near Makariv, where battles were taking place. It was part of the Kyiv Offense.

== Famous people ==
The village was the estate of Jakym Yerlych, a Ukrainian nobleman, chronicler, author of the Polish-language Chronicler, or Chronicle of Various Affairs and Events.
