= Vyaznovatovka =

Vyaznovatovka Вязноватовка
- Selo
- Location within Voronezh Oblast Location within Russia
- Coordinates: 51°35′N 38°27′E
- Country: Russia
- Region: Voronezh Oblast
- District: Nizhnedevitsky District
- Time zone: UTC+3:00

Vyaznovatovka (Russian: Вязноватовка) is a rural locality (a selo) and the administrative center of Vyaznovatovskoye Rural Settlement, Nizhnedevitsky District, Voronezh Oblast, Russia. The population was 1,016 as of 2018. There are 9 streets.

== Geography ==
Vyaznovatovka is located 15 km northeast of Nizhnedevitsk (the district's administrative centre) by road. Novaya Olshanka is the nearest rural locality.
