= Ovruch (air base) =

Air base in Zhytomyr Oblast, Ukraine

- IATA: none; ICAO: UKBO

Summary
- Airport type: Military
- Operator: Ukrainian Air Force
- Location: Ovruch
- Elevation AMSL: 528 ft / 161 m
- Coordinates: 51°16′0″N 028°43′0″E
- Interactive map of Ovruch

Runways
Direction	Length		Surface
Direction	ft	m	Surface
	8,202	2,500	Concrete

Ovruch (also Ovruch Southwest) is an air base in Zhytomyr Oblast, Ukraine located 8 km southwest of Ovruch. There are three large parking areas for fighters.

The base appears to have capacity for about 50 planes.

In 1993, the military unit was transferred to the village of Cherliany, Horodok Raion. The airbase itself is used for purpose of storage and utilization of airplanes.

== Staffing ==
Units stationed at Ovruch include the 4070th BRSV, with just over 140 Sukhoi Su-17 aircraft as of 1992).
