= Syrnytsia =

Coordinates: 51°26′02″N 28°09′31″E

Syrnytsia (Ukrainian: Сирниця) is a village in Zhytomyr Oblast, Ukraine. It has a population of 243.

== History ==
It was formerly called Rudnia Syrnytsia.

On November 19, 1921, during the November raid through Rudniya-Syrnytsia, returning from the campaign, the remnants of the Volyn group (commander — Yurii Tiutiunnyk) of the Army of the Ukrainian People's Republic passed. The village was occupied by Russian troops during the Kyiv offensive of the invasion.
