= Ovruch =

City in Zhytomyr Oblast, Ukraine

Ovruch Овруч
- City
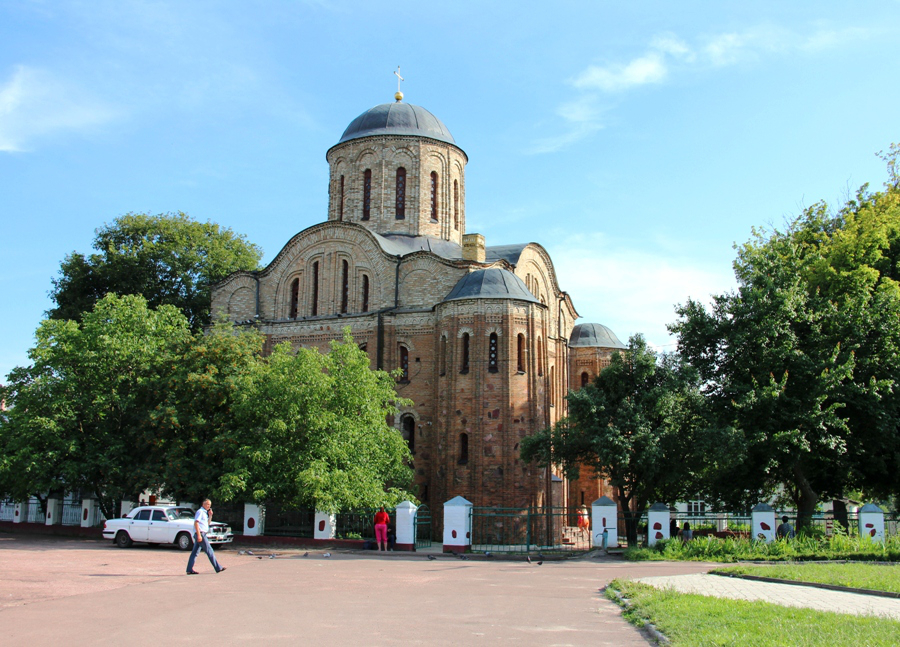
- St. Basil Church

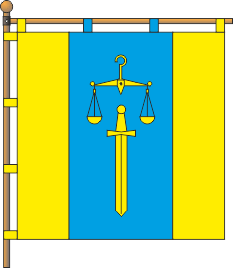
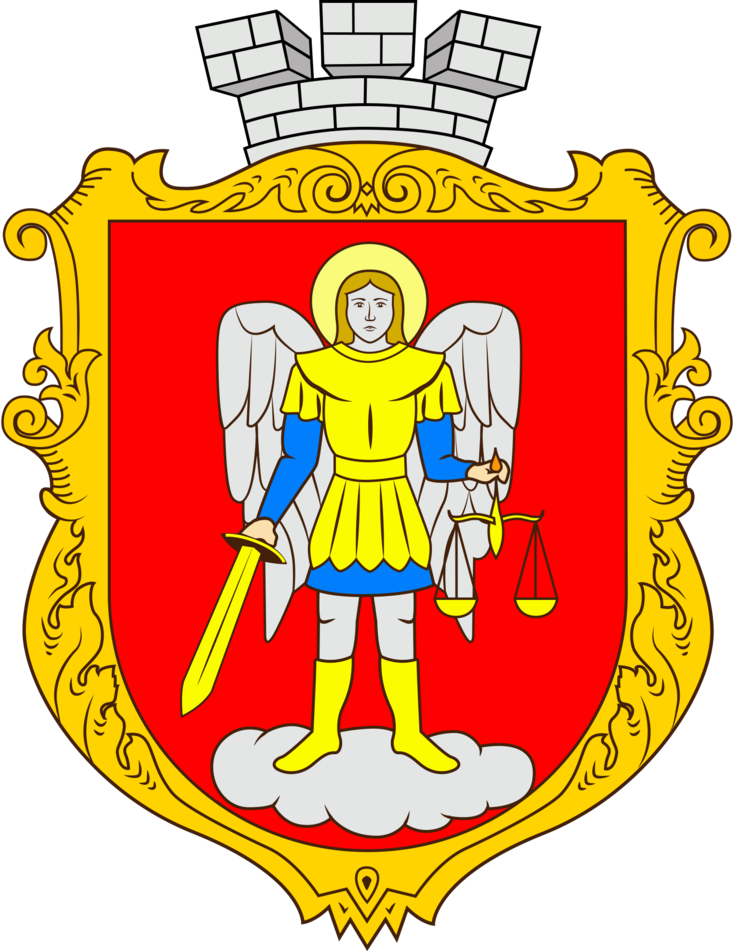
- Flag Coat of arms
- Interactive map of Ovruch
- Location of Ovruch in Ukraine Ovruch (Ukraine)
- Coordinates: 51°19′28″N 28°48′29″E
- Country: Ukraine
- Oblast: Zhytomyr Oblast
- Raion: Korosten Raion
- Hromada: Ovruch urban hromada
- Founded: 946
- City rights: 1641

Area
  - Total: 9 km^{2} (3.5 sq mi)
- Elevation: 149 m (489 ft)

Population (2022)
  - Total: 15,250
  - Estimate (01.12.2024): 15,873
  - Density: 1,700/km^{2} (4,400/sq mi)
- Postal code: 11100
- Area code: +380 4148
- Website: Official website

Ovruch (Ukrainian: Овруч, IPA: [ˈɔu̯rʊtʃ]) is a city in Korosten Raion, Zhytomyr Oblast, northern Ukraine.

It was first mentioned as Vruchiy in 977. It was the capital city of the Drevlians in the 10th century, later conquered by the Mongol Empire in the 13th century, then later part of the Grand Duchy of Lithuania. In the 16th century it became part of Poland, as a royal city. After the second partition of Poland in 1793 it became part of the Russian Empire, and then part of Ukraine. Until 2020, it was the administrative center of the former Ovruch Raion, until it was merged into Korosten Raion. It has a population of approximately 15,250 (2022 estimate), and is home to the Ovruch air base.

== Name ==
In addition to the Ukrainian Овруч (Ovruch), in other languages the name of the city is Polish: Owrucz and Yiddish: אוורוטש.

== History ==
=== Middle Ages ===
Ovruch originated as an important town of Kievan Rus', first mentioned as Vruchiy in 977. Later after the sack of Iskorosten it became the capital city of the Derevlians. During the 12th century Ovruch became a residence of Rurik Rostislavich, who rebuilt the local wooden Church of St. Basil in stone. During Rurik's rule the city was fortified.

Saint Hyacinth of Poland evangelized in the town between 1222 and 1234. The area suffered during the Mongol invasion of Kievan Rus' in 1240, and then it passed under Mongol suzerainty. In the 14th century it became part of the Grand Duchy of Lithuania. It became one of many Lithuanian defensive strongholds in the region against possible Tatar invasions. In 1483 and 1506 Crimean Tatars destroyed the settlement.

=== Modern period ===
From the 16th century the town was governed by starosts, and it flourished and became a subregional center.

According to the Treaty of Lublin (1569), Owrucz passed to Poland within the Polish–Lithuanian Commonwealth. The town also served as the seat of county sejmiks. From 1614 until his death in 1616, the starost of Owrucz was Michał Wiśniowiecki, grandfather of future Polish King Michał Korybut Wiśniowiecki. A Dominican Monastery was founded, confirmed by Bishop Aleksander Sokołowski in 1638. In 1641, Polish King Władysław IV Vasa granted Owrucz city rights. It was a royal city of Poland.

After suffering from a major fire in 1578, Ovruch was once again damaged during the Khmelnytsky Uprising of 1648. In 1678 a Jesuit college moved to Ovruch from nearby Ksaveriv. During the 18th century a Catholic church was established at the local monastery. Following the disbandment of Jesuits in 1773 the building was transferred to Basilian monks, who established a school there. After the Second Partition of Poland in 1793 it was annexed by the Russian Empire.

During the 18th and 19th century around half of Ovruch's population consisted of Hasidic Jews, who established a shtetl.

Following the defeat of the Polish Uprising of 1831 the local Catholic church was transferred to the Orthodox community. In 1881, it had a population of 5,941.

=== 20th century ===
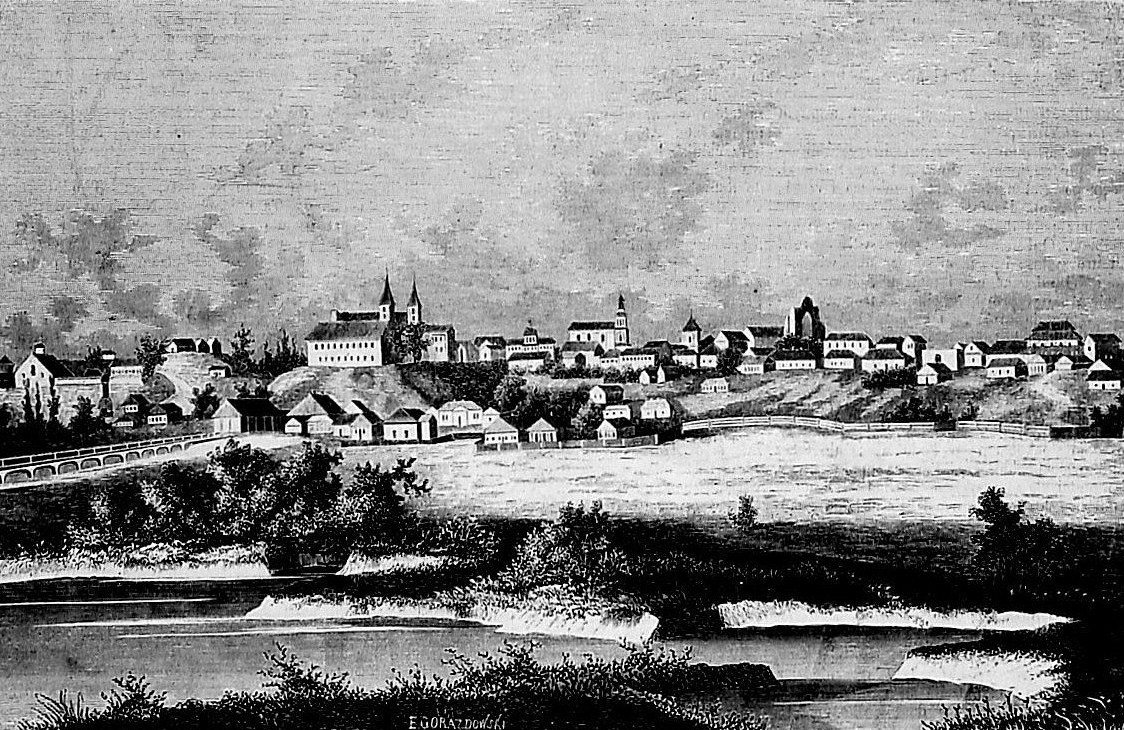
19th-century view of the city

In 1907-1911 the city's St. Basil's Cathedral, which had stood in ruins for several centuries, was reconstructed by a group of architects led by Alexey Shchusev.

The city suffered from the man-made famine Holodomor of 1932-1933. In 2008, the National Museum of the Holodomor-Genocide published the National Book of Memory of the Victims of the Holodomor of 1932-1933 in Ukraine. Zhytomyr region - Zhytomyr. According to historical records, more than 1517 people died during Holodomor in 1932-1933.

In 1918 Ovruch's Jewish quarter was destroyed as a result of a pogrom perpetrated by forces of otaman Kozyr-Zirka.

The command of the Soviet 15th Rifle Corps was based in Ovruch shortly before the Soviet invasion of Poland at the start of World War II in September 1939. The 15th Rifle Corps invaded towards Dawidgródek, Kamień Koszyrski and Włodawa. From 1941, the town was occupied by Germany.

Following the German occupation, the remaining Jewish population faced systematic persecution. Starting September 1941, these residents were forced into a ghetto. The majority of the Jewish population of Ovruch and its neighboring counties were shot to death during August and September of 1941. Ovruch became a place for extermination of not only local Jews, but also Jews from Yelsk. People were executed in a ravine near the walls of St. Basil's Convent. In the 1970s, a memorial was erected on the site of the execution.

The German occupiers operated a Jewish forced labour battalion in the town. Mordechai Schlein, a Jewish-Belarusian partisan, blew up a restaurant with about 200 German officers in it.

In 1990 a women's monastery was reestablished on the base of St. Basil's Cathedral.

=== 21 st century ===
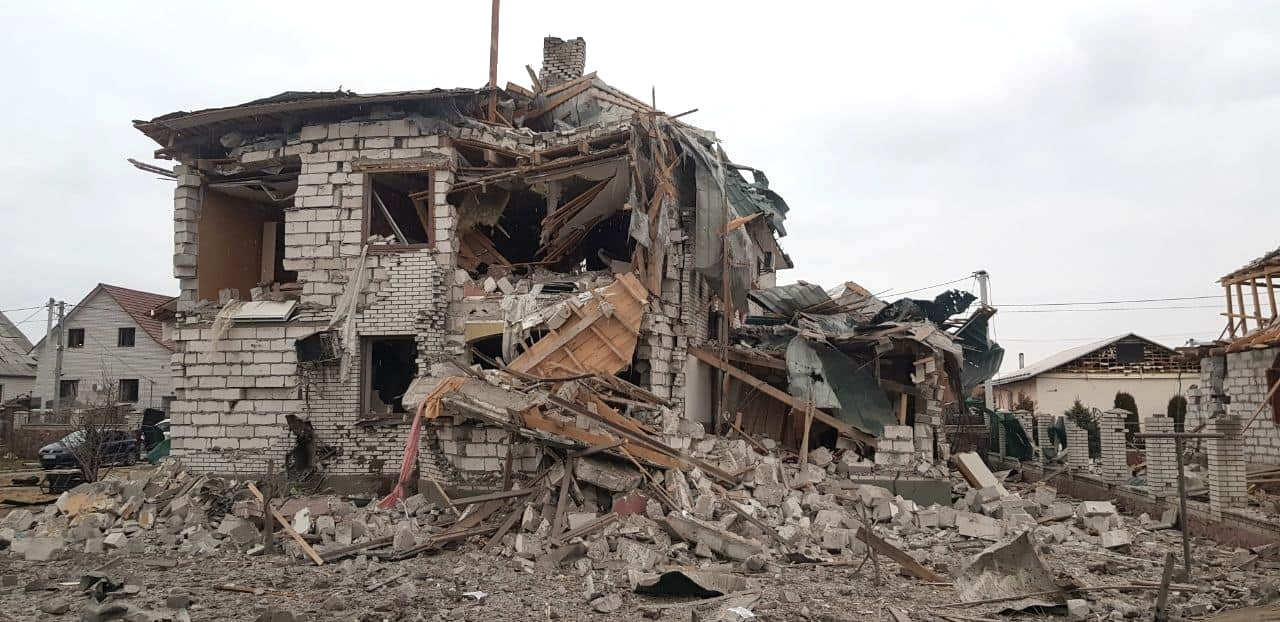
Ruins of a house after the 2022 Russian invasion

During the 2022 Russian invasion of Ukraine, on March 6, at 2:32 a.m., enemy forces launched 3 bomb attacks on the residential sector of Ovruch. A total of 45 private houses were damaged, 5 of which were completely destroyed. There was also significant damage to 43 apartments in a multi-storey building, the premises of a children's and youth art center, a music school and a gym.

Around 20:30, Russian troops conducted 6 more air strikes. Three civilians were killed. As a result, the building of the Ovruch Employment Center was completely destroyed. Also damaged were the premises of the Ovruch City Hospital, the Centers for administrative services, apartments in 8 multi-storey buildings, about 5 private houses, one of which was completely destroyed, and 2 more are in disrepair.

== Architecture ==
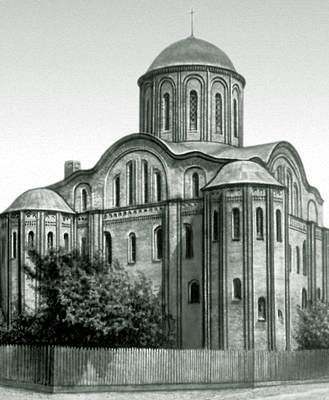
St. Basil's Church

The only mark of the town's antiquity is St. Basil's Church, commissioned by Rurik II of Kyiv from his court architect Peter Miloneg in the late 1190s. The church was built in Rurik's votchina and was dedicated to his patron saint.

St. Basil's Church has four pillars, three apses and one dome. The western facade is flanked by two round towers, probably in imitation of the Saint Sophia Cathedral in Kyiv. The building is distinguished by elaborate brick facades, interlaced with bands of polished colored stone. The complicated design of pilasters points to a complex system of roofing and to a very high dome. The dome and vaults collapsed during the siege of Ovruch by Gediminas in 1321. The ruins of the church survived until 1842, when they crumbled, with the exception of three apses and a portion of the northern wall with an arch. In 1782, a small wooden church was constructed inside of the original building.

In 1907 Aleksey Shchusev was commissioned to restore the church to its presumed original form, incorporating the remains of Rurik's church into its edifice. Restoration work lasted for two years, and it won Schusev the prestigious title of the Academician of Architecture. More recently, the accuracy of his restoration has been questioned, as it didn't take into account the complicated system of vaulting and the considerable height of the drum. As a consequence of this oversight, the drum was restored according to a model typical of more archaic churches, rather than for the turn of the 13th century. Adjacent buildings of St. Basil's Convent were built on the model of medieval architecture of Pskov, simultaneously with the restoration of the main church. The restoration was finished in 1908, giving the building a pseudo-Byzantine appearance.

Historically, Ovruch used to host two Catholic monasteries owned by the Jesuits and Dominicans. Both have been destroyed, and the Catholic Church of St, Nicholas has since then been replaced by a Russian Orthodox Church.

== Economy ==
=== Medieval industrial centre ===
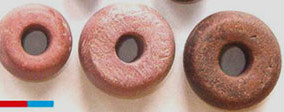
Ovruch slate spindle whorl

A particularly valuable commodity, produced in the Volhynian city of Ovruch in the 10th–13th centuries, was the reddish-coloured slate spindle whorl, carved out of pink and red slate stone (pyrophyllite slate), which was mined near the town of Ovruch in the territory of present-day Ukraine. Ovruch masters diligently repeated the most successful form of a clay spindle whorl - biconical (the weight as if consisted of two truncated cones connected by broad bases) The spindle whorl weighed on average about 16 g, the height was from 4 to 12 mm, the outer diameter was from 10 to 25 mm, the diameter of the hole for the spindle was 6–10 mm. If the spindle whorl turned out to be too narrow, it was wrapped with a thread so that it would not slip during rotation. Slate - soft stone; on the samples found by archaeologists, there are still scuffs from the threads. The production of slate spindles in Ovruch was designed for wide sales. The merchants who bought the consignment of the spindle whorls made a considerable way with them, sold them in different lands. Ovruch spindle whorls are found by archaeologists not only in the territories of Kievan Rus', but in other regions. Production of spindle whorls was designed for a wide sale. Ovruch's production and widespread sale of spindle whorls contributed significantly to the Galician–Volhynian economy. According to A. V. Artsikhovsky, "they are exactly the same in Kiev and Vladimir, in Novgorod and Ryazan, even in Cherson, in the Crimea and in the Bulgaria on the Volga." The Ovruch spindle whorls were so valued that the owners carved their personal tags on them, and after the spread of writing - carved their names. In the mid-13th century, the stone spindle whorls become clay again: the workshops of Ovruch were destroyed during the Mongol invasion of Kievan Rus'.

== Geography ==
Located in northwestern Ukraine, 50 kilometres (31 mi) south of the Belarusian border, Ovruch is part of the geographical region of Polesia. It is located 48 kilometres (30 mi) from Korosten, 133 kilometres (83 mi) from Zhytomyr, and 92 kilometres (57 mi) from Mazyr, in Belarus; and it is 100 kilometres (62 mi) from the ghost town of Pripyat, near the Chernobyl Nuclear Power Plant.

=== Climate ===
Climate data for Ovruch (1991–2020)
Month	Jan	Feb	Mar	Apr	May	Jun	Jul	Aug	Sep	Oct	Nov	Dec	Year
Mean daily maximum °C (°F)	−1.0 (30.2)	0.6 (33.1)	6.4 (43.5)	14.9 (58.8)	20.9 (69.6)	24.3 (75.7)	26.0 (78.8)	25.4 (77.7)	19.6 (67.3)	12.5 (54.5)	5.0 (41.0)	0.2 (32.4)	12.9 (55.2)
Daily mean °C (°F)	−3.6 (25.5)	−2.7 (27.1)	1.8 (35.2)	8.8 (47.8)	14.5 (58.1)	18.0 (64.4)	19.7 (67.5)	18.7 (65.7)	13.5 (56.3)	7.5 (45.5)	2.1 (35.8)	−2.1 (28.2)	8.0 (46.4)
Mean daily minimum °C (°F)	−6.1 (21.0)	−5.8 (21.6)	−2.0 (28.4)	3.7 (38.7)	8.8 (47.8)	12.5 (54.5)	14.3 (57.7)	13.2 (55.8)	8.7 (47.7)	3.6 (38.5)	−0.4 (31.3)	−4.5 (23.9)	3.8 (38.8)
Average precipitation mm (inches)	35 (1.4)	36 (1.4)	43 (1.7)	41 (1.6)	63 (2.5)	70 (2.8)	100 (3.9)	60 (2.4)	50 (2.0)	48 (1.9)	44 (1.7)	43 (1.7)	633 (24.9)
Average precipitation days (≥ 1.0 mm)	9.2	9.2	8.8	7.4	8.9	9.3	10.1	7.1	7.0	7.8	8.5	9.5	102.8
Average relative humidity (%)	86.2	83.4	77.3	69.1	69.3	71.0	73.6	73.5	78.5	82.7	87.8	88.3	78.4
Source: NOAA

== Notable people ==
- Vladimir Bogoraz (1865–1936), revolutionary, writer and anthropologist
- Stefano Ittar (1724–1790), Polish-Italian architect
- Oleksandr Lavrynovych (born 1956), physicist, lawyer and politician
- Yuri Nemyrych (1612–1659), politician of the Polish–Lithuanian Commonwealth

== Gallery ==
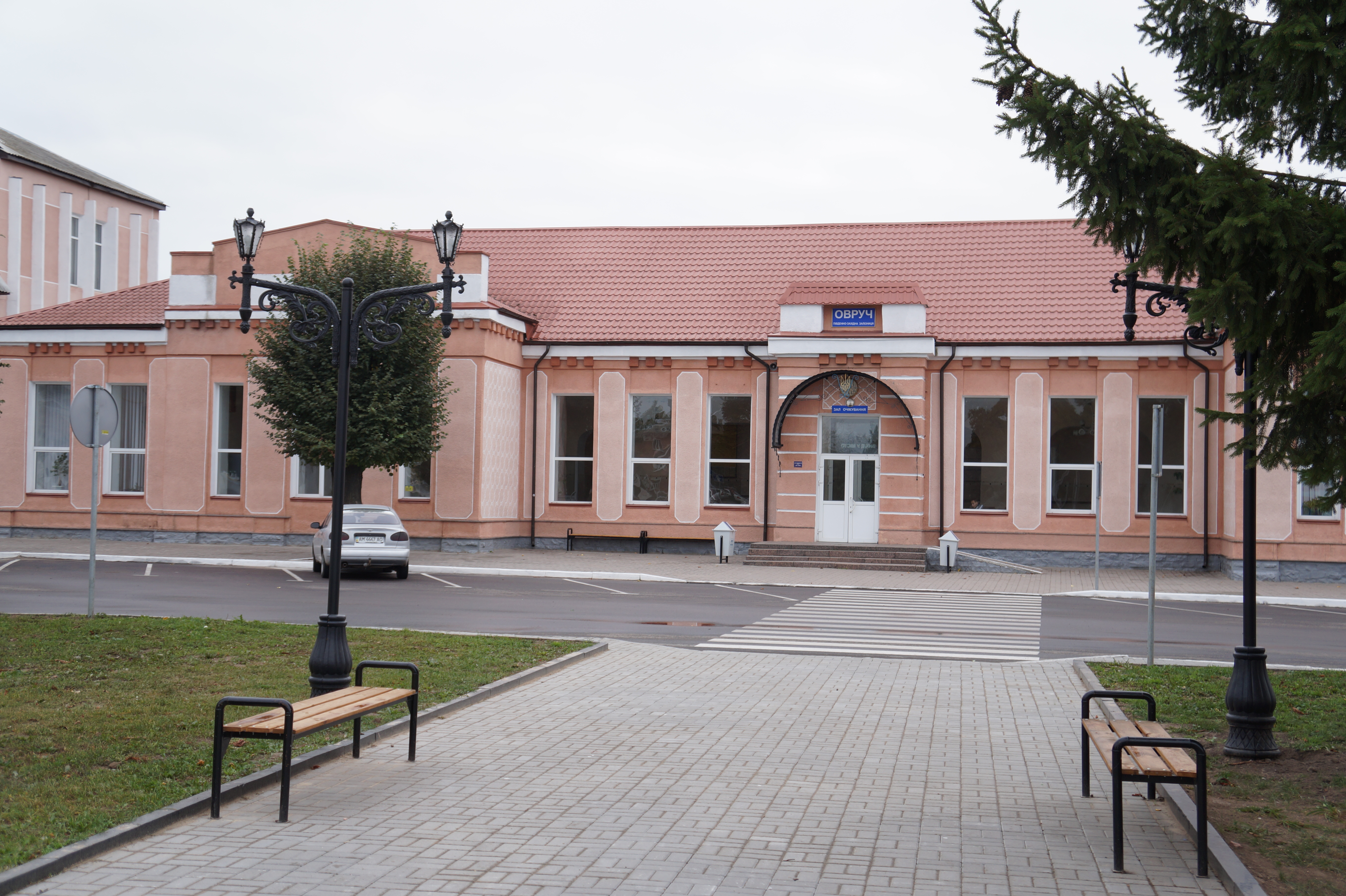
Ovruch railway station

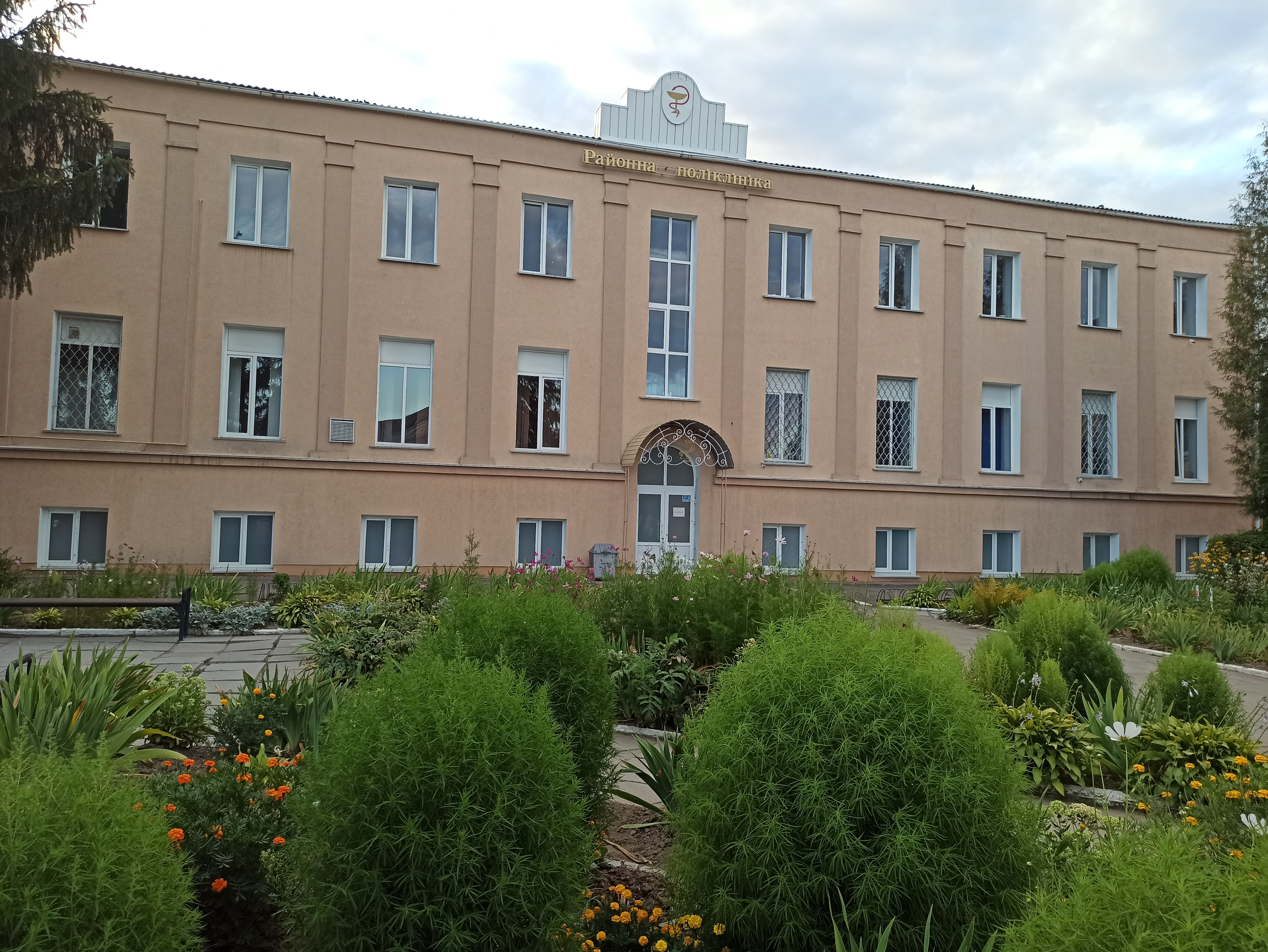
Health center

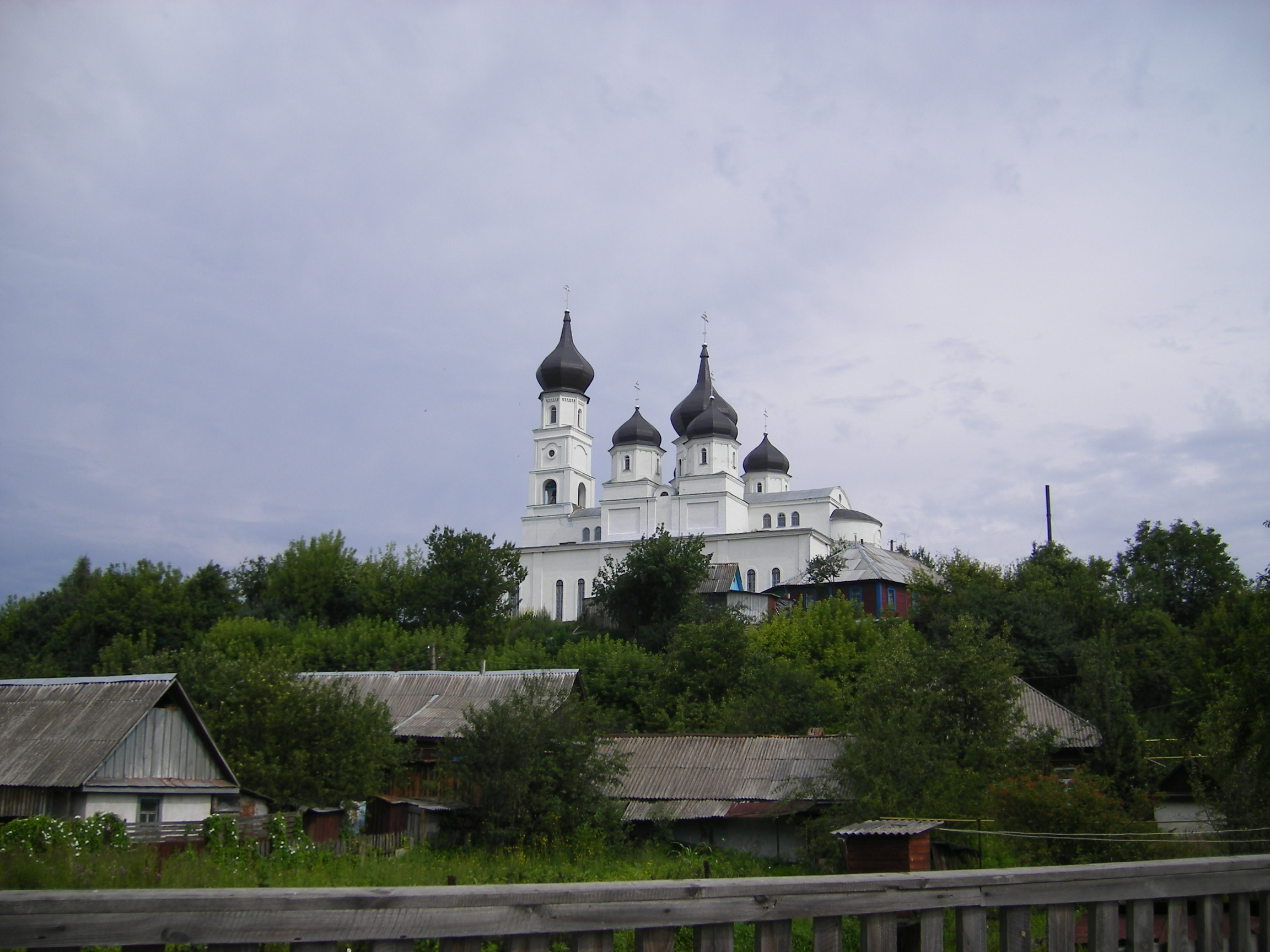
Transfiguration Church

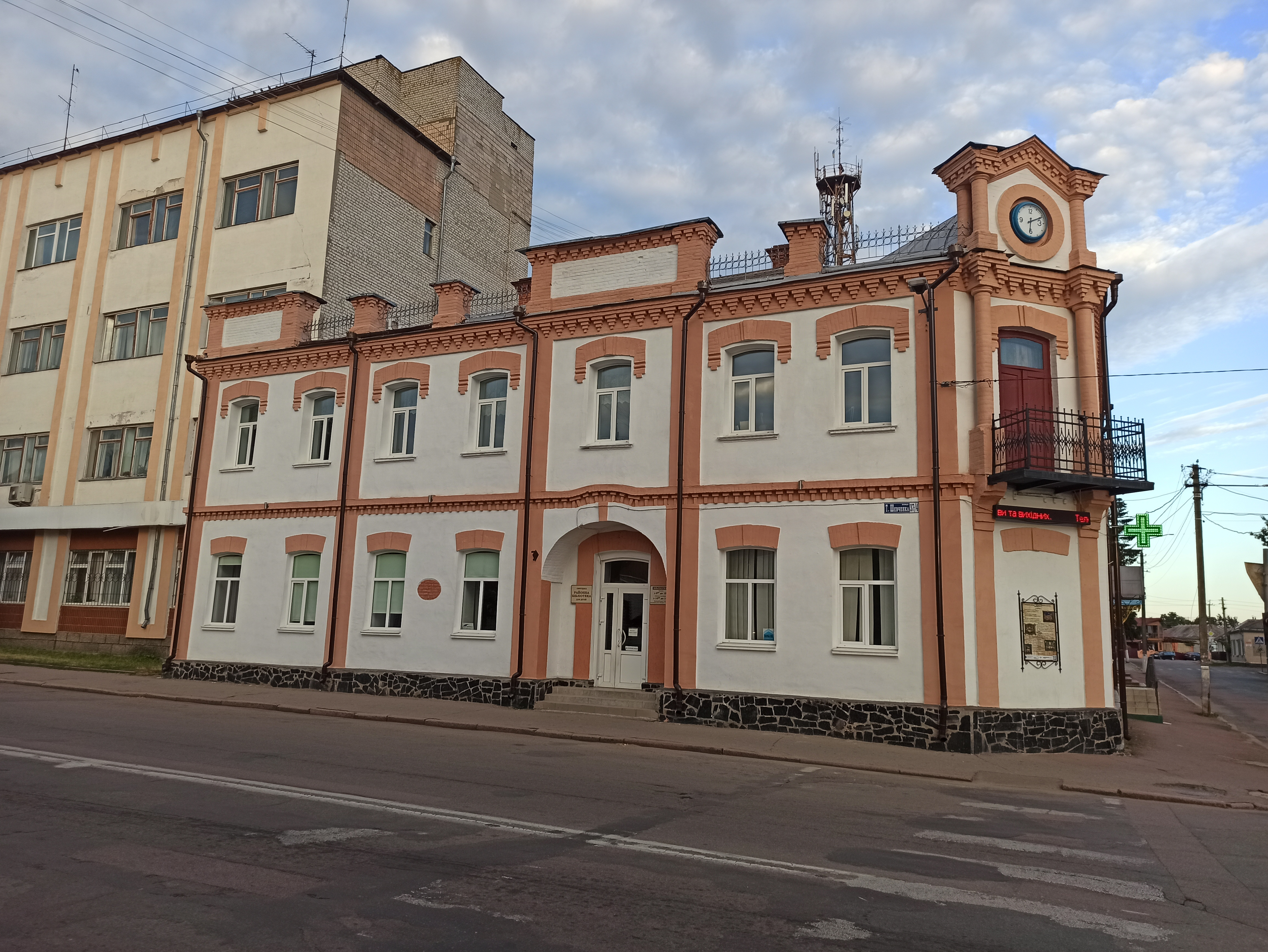
Historic building in town's centre

== See also ==
- Chernihiv–Ovruch railway

== Sources ==
- Martin, Janet (2007). Medieval Russia: 980–1584 (2nd ed.). Cambridge University Press. ISBN 978-0-511-36800-4.
- Памятники градостроительства и архитектуры Украинской ССР. Kiev, 1983–86. Vol. 2, page 153 (online)
