= Davydky, Horshchyk rural hromada, Korosten Raion =

Coordinates: 50°56′56″N 28°26′19″E

Davydky
- Village
- Ukrainian: Давидки
- Interactive map of Davydky
- Country: Ukraine
- Oblast: Zhytomyr Oblast
- Raion: Korosten
- Population: 210

Davydky (Ukrainian: Давидки) is a Ukrainian village founded in 1682 and that is located in the Korosten Raion (district) of the Zhytomyr Oblast (province).
