= Davydky, Narodychi settlement hromada, Korosten Raion =

Coordinates: 51°19′23″N 29°18′18″E

Davydky is a village in Narodychi settlement hromada, Korosten Raion, Zhytomyr Oblast, northern Ukraine.

During the Russian invasion of Ukraine, Davydky was under Russian control between 24 February and 3 April 2022.
