= Kvitneve =

Kvitneve Квітневе
- Village
- Location of Kvitneve in Ukraine Kvitneve (Ukraine)
- Coordinates: 50°18′44″N 29°16′47″E
- Country: Ukraine
- Oblast: Zhytomyr Oblast
- Raion: Zhytomyr Raion
- Hromada: Korostyshiv urban hromada
- First Settled: 1783

Area
  - Total: 2,956 km^{2} (1,141 sq mi)
- Elevation: 179 m (587 ft)

Population
  - Total: 341
  - Density: 115.36/km^{2} (298.8/sq mi)

Kvitneve (Ukrainian: Квітневе. Formerly known as Voitashivka: Ukrainian: Войташівка, Polish: Wojtaszówka. From 1946 to 1963, Dubovets: Ukrainian: Дубовець) is a village in Zhytomyr Raion, Zhytomyr Oblast, Ukraine. It has a population of 341 people.

== History ==
In 1617, the town of Wojtaszówce belonged to Volhynian steward Adam Józef Olizar-Wołczkiewicz.

In 1628, Wojtaszówka was owned by the Kyiv district defendant Łukasz Witowski.

In the middle of the 19th century, Voitashivka, along with other possessions of Gustav Filippovich Olizar, was passed to his son Karol.
