= Narodychi Raion =

Former subdivision of Zhytomyr Oblast, Ukraine

Narodychi Raion Народицький район
- Raion
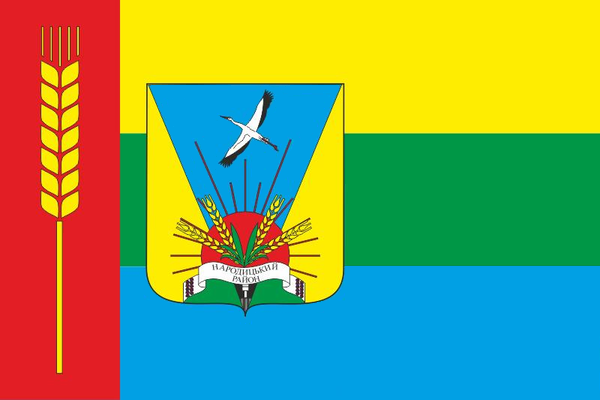
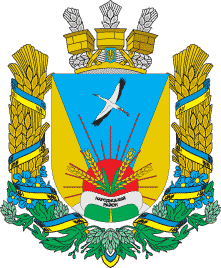
- Flag Coat of arms

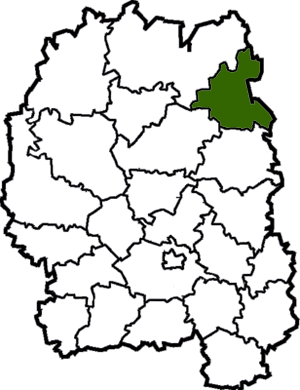
- Coordinates: 51°12′21″N 29°4′29″E
- Country: Ukraine
- Oblast: Zhytomyr Oblast
- Established: 1923
- Disestablished: 18 July 2020
- Admin. center: Narodychi
- Subdivisions: List: 0 — city councils; 1 — settlement councils; — rural councils; Number of localities: 0 — cities; 1 — urban-type settlements; — villages; — rural settlements

Area
  - Total: 1,284 km^{2} (496 sq mi)

Population (2020)
  - Total: 9,458 ▼
  - Density: 7.366/km^{2} (19.08/sq mi)
- Time zone: UTC+02:00 (EET)
  - Summer (DST): UTC+03:00 (EEST)
- Area code: +380

Narodychi Raion (Ukrainian: Народицький район) was a raion (district) of Zhytomyr Oblast in northern Ukraine. Its administrative centre was located at Narodychi. The last estimate of the raion population before its abolition in 2020 was 9,458 (2020 est.).

== Geography ==
The raion was located in the Polesian Lowland. It covered an area of 1,284 square kilometres (496 mi^{2}).

== History ==
Narodychi Raion was formed in 1923. During World War II, the raion was occupied by Nazi Germany between 1941 and November 1943.

As a result of the Chernobyl disaster, people were permanently evacuated from numerous villages in the raion.

Narodychi Raion was abolished on 18 July 2020 as part of the administrative reform of Ukraine, which reduced the number of raions of Zhytomyr Oblast to four. The area of Narodychi Raion was merged into Korosten Raion.

== Demographics ==
As of the 2001 Ukrainian census, Narodychi Raion had a population of 11,439 people, predominantly ethnic Ukrainians. By 2020, the population had declined to 9,458.
