= Korosten Raion =

Subdivision of Zhytomyr Oblast, Ukraine

Korosten Raion Коростенський район
- Raion
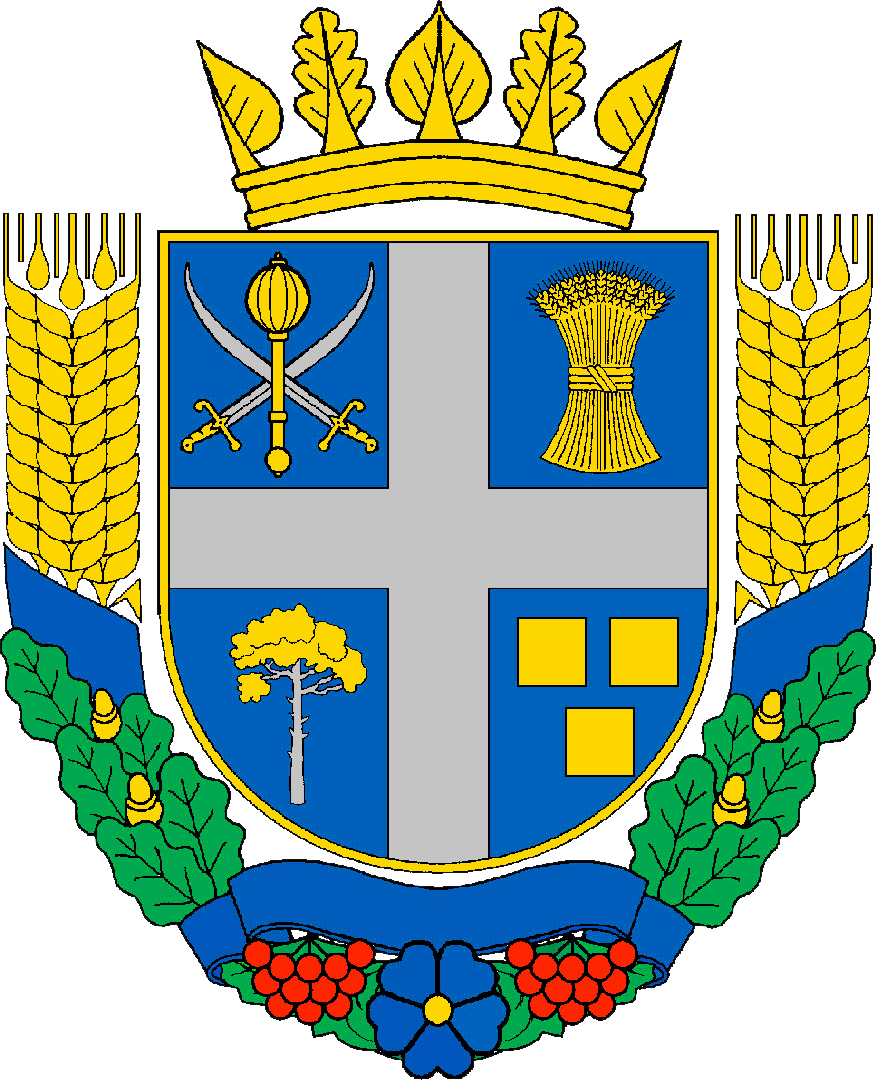
- Coat of arms

- Interactive map of Korosten Raion
- Coordinates: 51.16°N 28.46°E
- Country: Ukraine
- Oblast: Zhytomyr
- Admin. center: Korosten
- Subdivisions: 13 hromadas

Area
  - Total: 10,897.6 km^{2} (4,207.6 sq mi)

Population (2022)
  - Total: 251,208
  - Density: 23.0517/km^{2} (59.7036/sq mi)
- Time zone: UTC+02:00 (EET)
  - Summer (DST): UTC+03:00 (EEST)
- Area code: +380

Korosten Raion (Ukrainian: Коростенський район) is a raion (district) of Zhytomyr Oblast, northern Ukraine. Its administrative centre is Korosten. The raion covers an area of 10,897.6 square kilometres (4,207.6 mi^{2}). It makes Korosten raion the largest by area in Ukraine. Population: 251,208 (2022 estimate).

On 18 July 2020, as part of the administrative reform of Ukraine, the number of raions of Zhytomyr Oblast was reduced to four, and the area of Korosten Raion was significantly expanded. Before the expansion, the area of the raion was 865.2 square kilometres (334.1 mi^{2}). The January 2020 estimate of the raion population was 25,297 (2020 est.).

== Geography ==
Korosten district borders Zviahel and Zhytomyr raions of Zhytomyr Oblast, Kyiv and Rivne regions of Ukraine. The district borders Belarus. Korosten district is located on the Polesian Lowland, in Zhytomyr Polissya . The Slovechansko-Ovrutskyi ridge is located within the boundaries of the Korosten district. The territory of the district is located in a zone of mixed forests, where pine, hornbeam, and oak are the most common. The Zherev River, a left tributary of the Uzh (Prypiat Basin), flows entirely within the boundaries of the Korosten District.

Mineral resources of the district: peat, kaolin, granite.

The climate of the Zhytomyr district is moderately continental, with humid summers and mild winters. The average annual temperature is approximately 10 °C, the average temperature in January is 4-5 °C, and in July it is about +20 °C. The annual amount of precipitation is 570 mm.

Korosten is European highway E373.

== Notable landmarks ==
The Drevlians and Polissya nature reserves, as well as 4 state-level reserves, have been created in the Korosten district.

== Economy ==
Agricultural Institute of Polesia is located in the village of Hrozyne.

== Bibliography ==
- Національний атлас України/НАН України, Інститут географії, Державна служба геодезії, картографії та кадастру; голов. ред. Л. Г. Руденко; голова ред. кол.Б.Є. Патон. — К.: ДНВП «Картографія», 2007. — 435 с. — 5 тис.прим. — ISBN 978-966-475-067-4.

== Settlements ==
- Davydky, Horshchyk rural hromada
- Davydky, Narodychi settlement hromada
- Hunychi
- Khodaky
- Kupech
- Verkhnia Rudnia
