= 100th Rifle Division =

Soviet Red Army formation

- Active: 1924–1945
- Country: Soviet Union
- Branch: Red Army
- Type: Infantry
- Size: Division
- Engagements: Winter War World War II: Operation Barbarossa; Yelnya Offensive; Case Blue; Battle of Voronezh (1943); Third Battle of Kharkov; Zhitomir-Berdichev Offensive; Dnieper-Carpathian Offensive; Lvov-Sandomierz Offensive; Sandomierz-Silesian Offensive; Upper Silesian Offensive; Lower Silesian Offensive; Moravian-Ostrava Offensive; Prague Offensive
- Decorations: Order of Lenin (1st formation)
- Battle honours: Lviv (2nd formation)

Commanders
- Notable commanders: Vasily Yushkevich; Arkady Yermakov Ivan Russiyanov Frants Perkhorovich; Nikolai Bezzubov

The 100th Rifle Division was an infantry division of the Soviet Union's Red Army during World War II, formed twice.

In November 1923 in the Belaya Tserkov area of the Ukrainian Military District, the 45th Territorial Rifle Division was established. On 24 April 1924 the 45th Territorial Rifle Division became the 100th Rifle Division (Territorial).

The division fought in the Winter War with Finland. When Operation Barbarossa began, it was part of 2nd Rifle Corps, with 2nd Rifle Corps immediately subordinate to Western Front (Soviet Union). It became 1st Guards Rifle Division on 18 September 1941, one of the first Guards units, immediately after the Yelnya Offensive.

The second formation of the division began forming at Kushchuba station in Vologda Oblast on 5 February 1942. Predominantly Russian, it was primarily made up of conscripts from Vologda Oblast and Arkhangelsk Oblast. The formation of the division was completed by 15 May. Fought near Stalingrad, and in Ukraine and Belorussia. It was awarded the honorific "Lviv" for its part in the capture of that city during July 1944. On 27 January 1945, the division liberated the Auschwitz-Birkenau Concentration Camp. During the Moravian-Ostrava Offensive, the division captured Ratibor and entered Czechoslovak territory. It then fought in the Prague Offensive. It was with 60th Army of the 4th Ukrainian Front in May 1945. The division was disbanded in the final days of June and its personnel used to reinforce the 186th Rifle Division at Turek.
