= Frants Perkhorovich =

Soviet Army lieutenant general (1894–1961)

Frants Iosifovich Perkhorovich
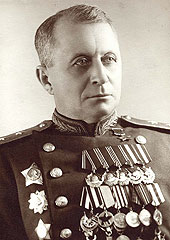
- Native name: Франц Иосифович Перхорович
- Born: 27 May 1894; Zalazy village, Borisovsky Uyezd, Minsk Governorate, Russian Empire
- Died: 11 October 1961 (aged 67) Moscow, Soviet Union
- Allegiance: Russian Empire; Soviet Union
- Branch: Imperial Russian Army; Red Army (later Soviet Army)
- Service years: 1915–1917; 1918–1951
- Rank: Lieutenant general
- Commands: 100th Rifle Division; 52nd Rifle Corps; 3rd Guards Rifle Corps; 47th Army; 28th Army
- Conflicts: World War I; Russian Civil War; World War II
- Awards: Hero of the Soviet Union; Order of Lenin (3); Order of the Red Banner (3); Order of Suvorov, 1st and 2nd class; Order of Kutuzov, 2nd class; Legion of Merit; Knight's Cross of the Virtuti Militari; Cross of Grunwald, 3rd class

Frants Iosifovich Perkhorovich (Russian: Франц Иосифович Перхорович; 27 May 1894 – 11 October 1961) was a Belarusian Soviet Army lieutenant general and a Hero of the Soviet Union.

Perkhorovich served in World War I as an Imperial Russian Army junior officer, then joined the Bolsheviks in the subsequent Russian Civil War. He became a Red Army officer and was briefly captured in the Polish–Soviet War. Perkhorovich continued to serve in the interwar period, but was dismissed from the Red Army during the Great Purge. Reinstated in 1939, he successively commanded two regiments after the German invasion of the Soviet Union in June 1941. Perkhorovich took command of the 100th Rifle Division in May 1942, the 52nd Rifle Corps in June 1943, and the 3rd Guards Rifle Corps in May 1944. In November of that year he became commander of the 47th Army, and for his leadership in the Vistula–Oder Offensive in January 1945 was awarded the title Hero of the Soviet Union, the highest Soviet distinction. Postwar, Perkhorovich continued to serve, becoming chief of the General Staff's Combat Training Directorate before his 1951 retirement.

== Early life and World War I ==
Frants Iosifovich Perkhorovich was born on 27 May 1894 in the village of Zalazy in Minsk Governorate (now Dokshytsy Raion, Minsk Region) to a working-class family. Of Polish descent, he was a member of the hereditary nobility. In 1912, he graduated from the Lepiel City School. In March 1915, Perkhorovich was drafted into the Imperial Russian Army as a private and was assigned to the 232nd Reserve Infantry Battalion at Kharkov, where he graduated from training courses and became a junior unteroffizier. Perkhorovich graduated from the 2nd Moscow School of Praporshchiks and from two-month sapper courses with the 5th Sapper Battalion in 1916. In February, he became a junior officer in the 242nd Reserve Battalion. Perkhorovich was sent to the Northwestern Front in the fall of 1916, where he became a half-company commander and acting company commander in the 437th Sestroretsk Infantry Regiment, and the 743rd Tirul Infantry Regiment. Both units were fighting on the Riga front. In May 1917, Perkhorovich was gassed and evacuated to a hospital in Tver. When the Imperial Army collapsed as a result of the Russian Revolution, he was a lieutenant.

== Russian Civil War ==
Perkhorovich joined the Red Army in August 1918, serving with the 4th Rostov Red Guards Detachment, which became the 151st Rifle Regiment of the 17th Rifle Division. He was the regimental adjutant until February 1920, during which the division fought near Pinsk, Mozyr, and Korosten against the Ukrainian People's Army and partisans in Belarus and Ukraine until the spring of 1919. From that time, the division fought in the Polish–Soviet War against Polish troops around Vilnius and Polotsk. In February 1920, Perkhorovich was transferred to become assistant chief of staff of the 19th Rifle Brigade in the 7th Rifle Division, with which he served in battles at Novohrad-Volynskyi and Korosten. He was a prisoner of war between May and June after being captured by Polish troops. After being released, he became adjutant of the 151st Rifle Regiment, and assistant chief of staff for operations of the 17th Division's 51st Brigade. Perkhorovich served in the Soviet offensive on Minsk and the Battle of Warsaw, then took part in the elimination of Stanisław Bułak-Bałachowicz's attempted Belarusian national uprising until November of that year.

== Interwar period ==
In June 1921, Perkhorovich became commander of a separate company, stationed in Alexandrov. From January 1923, he served with the 17th Rifle Division's 49th Rifle Regiment at Nizhny Novgorod as its assistant chief of staff and then chief of staff. Perkhorovich became a Communist Party of the Soviet Union member in 1926, and from March, served successively as chief of a department, assistant chief, and deputy chief of a staff department in the Moscow Military District headquarters. In 1932, he graduated from a one-year course at the Military Academy of the Red Army. In February 1936, Perkhorovich became assistant chief of the operations staff department of the Moscow Military District, and in November 1937 was transferred to become the military commissar of the Moscow Planning Institute. He was dismissed from the Red Army in August 1938, during the Great Purge, but was reinstated in November 1939, becoming a teacher in the combat training department at the State Central Institute of Physical Education in December. He became an assistant professor in the institute's combat training department in May 1940. Perkhorovich graduated from the Vystrel higher officers' tactical improvement courses in 1941.

== World War II ==
In the early days of the war, Perkhorovich was appointed commander of the 211th Rifle Division's 787th Rifle Regiment, part of the Moscow Military District. In July, he took command of the 630th Rifle Regiment of the 107th Rifle Division, part of the 24th Army of the Reserve Front. Perkhorovich led the regiment in the Yelnya Offensive, after which the division became the 5th Guards Rifle Division. During the defensive phase of the Battle of Moscow in November, his regiment was surrounded near Zabolote, and fought behind German lines for twenty days until Perkhorovich led the remnants in a breakout to Soviet lines near Tula. In January, he took command of a regiment in the 5th Guards Rifle Division and in February became the deputy commander of the division. Perkhorovich fought in the Rzhev-Vyazma Offensive, advancing towards Yukhnov.

In May 1942, Perkhorovich took command of the 100th Rifle Division, part of the Arkhangelsk Military District, which in July moved to the Voronezh Front's 40th Army. He led the division in the heavy defensive fighting around Voronezh in the fall and was promoted to Major General on 20 December. Perkhrovich then led the division in the Voronezh-Kastornensk operation in January and February 1943, which recaptured the city, and the Third Battle of Kharkov in February and March. In June, Perkhorovich was appointed commander of the 52nd Rifle Corps of the army, which he led in the Battle of Kursk, the Belgorod-Khar'kov Offensive Operation, the Battle of the Dnieper, and the Zhitomir–Berdichev Offensive. He became commander of the 28th Army's 3rd Guards Rifle Corps in May 1944, leading it in the Minsk Offensive and the Lublin–Brest Offensive of Operation Bagration, and the Gumbinnen Operation. His corps recaptured Slutsk, Baranovichi, and Pruzhany during the summer.

From 17 November to the end of the war, Perkhorovich commanded the 47th Army of the 1st Belorussian Front. The army fought in the Vistula–Oder Offensive from 15 January 1945. During the first two days of the attack, the army eliminated heavily fortified German positions between the Vistula and the Western Bug, then crossed the Vistula and emerged in the rear of German troops defending Warsaw, playing a major role in the rapid capture of the city. Developing the offensive, the army rapidly moved west and by the end of the month had advanced 500 kilometers and reached the Oder. The 47th Army was reported by Soviet sources to have killed or captured 32,462 German soldiers, and captured 69 tanks, 600 guns, and 1,152 motor vehicles. On 27 January, he was promoted to Lieutenant General. For his leadership, Perkhorovich was awarded the title Hero of the Soviet Union and the Order of Lenin on 6 April. Continuing the advance, the army fought in the East Pomeranian Offensive and the Battle of Berlin. During the Battle of Berlin, attack as part of the front shock group, the 47th Army and 2nd Guards Tank Army reached positions west of Potsdam, where they linked up with the 4th Guards Tank Army, completing the encirclement of Berlin. By the end of the war on 8 May, the army had reached the Elbe northwest of Brandenburg.

== Postwar ==
In July 1945, Perkhorovich was appointed first deputy chief of the Soviet Military Administration in Saxony-Anhalt. In February 1946, he was appointed commander of the 28th Army, now stationed in the Belorussian Military District, but Perkhorovich did not actually assume command and in May he entered the Higher Academic Courses at the Higher Military Academy named for K.E. Voroshilov. Due to illness he was not able to graduate, but in April 1947, Perkhorovich became chief of the General Staff's Combat Training Directorate. He retired in July 1951 and lived in Moscow, where he died on 11 October 1961. Perkhorovich was buried in section 14 of the Vvedenskoye Cemetery. A street in Voronezh is named for him.
