= Ivan Russiyanov =

Soviet lieutenant general (1900–1984)

Ivan Nikitich Russiyanov
- Russiyanov in 1942
- Born: 11 September 1900; Shchuply, Koshchinsky Volost, Smolensky Uyezd, Smolensk Governorate, Russian Empire
- Died: 21 March 1984 (aged 83) Moscow, Soviet Union
- Allegiance: Russian SFSR; Soviet Union
- Branch: Red Army (later Soviet Army
- Service years: 1919–1953
- Rank: Lieutenant general
- Commands: 52nd Rifle Division; 100th Rifle Division; 1st Guards Rifle Division; 1st Guards Mechanized Corps
- Conflicts: Russian Civil War; Polish–Soviet War; World War II
- Awards: Hero of the Soviet Union; Order of Lenin (3); Order of the Red Banner (4); Order of Kutuzov, 1st class; Order of Suvorov, 2nd class

Ivan Nikitich Russiyanov (Russian: Иван Никитич Руссиянов; 11 September 1900 – 21 March 1984) was a Soviet Army lieutenant general and a Hero of the Soviet Union.

Russiyanov served as a clerk and in staff positions after joining the Red Army during the Russian Civil War. After graduating from an infantry command school he transferred to infantry units and commanded a division during the Soviet invasion of Poland. At the outbreak of Operation Barbarossa, Russiyanov commanded the 100th Rifle Division in Belarus. He led it in the Battle of Białystok–Minsk, the Battle of Smolensk, and the Yelnya Offensive. For its actions in the Yelnya Offensive, Russiyanov's division was converted into the 1st Guards Rifle Division. He continued to command the division after it was converted into the 1st Guards Mechanized Corps in late 1942 and led the corps for the rest of the war. Postwar, he served as an army deputy commander and in staff positions before retiring in the early 1950s, and was made a Hero of the Soviet Union in 1978 for his leadership in World War II.

== Early life and Russian Civil War ==
Russiyanov was born to a peasant family on 11 September 1900 in the village of Shchuply, Koshchinsky Volost, Smolensky Uyezd, Smolensk Governorate. He graduated from the Khlenovskoye zemstvo school in 1911 and the Koshkinskoye two-year school in 1916, then worked on the Smolensk railway and the Smolensk city tramway system. He worked as a clerk in the Smolensk Governorate Department of Social Security and Public Education from 1917, then from January 1918 the Smolensk Provincial Committee of the Leather Industry.

During the Russian Civil War, Russiyanov was drafted into the Red Army on 1 November 1919 and served with the headquarters of the 16th Army of the Western Front as a Red Army man and a clerk in the army inspection department. He fought in the Polish–Soviet War and in May 1921 was transferred to become a clerk in the special purpose detachment of the special department of the Western Front. In the same month the unit became the separate regiment of the Cheka Troops of the Western Border, and Russiyanov served with it as assistant adjutant, and in June became adjutant of the 2nd battalion and assistant chief of staff of the regiment. Between May and August he participated in operations against bandits in Smolensk Governorate.

== Interwar period ==
Russiyanov studied at the 3rd Western Infantry School for Command Personnel in Smolensk from November 1921, and from graduation in September 1924 served with the 81st Rifle Regiment of the 27th Rifle Division of the Western Military District (the Belorussian Military District from 1926). With the 81st Regiment, he served successively as a platoon commander, assistant company commander, company commander, and assistant battalion commander. Russiyanov transferred to the 22nd Rifle Regiment of the 8th Rifle Division in May 1930, serving as a battalion commander and later as assistant regimental commander. He studied at the Vystrel course from November 1930 to February 1931 and returned to the division to become assistant commander for personnel of the 24th Rifle Regiment. He completed the Vystrel course in January and February 1932 and in November of that year was appointed commander and military commissar of the 10th Rifle Regiment of the 4th Rifle Division.

Russiyanov rose in rank during the late 1930s due to vacancies created by the Great Purge and the massive expansion of the Red Army as it prepared for war, becoming assistant commander of the 29th Rifle Division in July 1937 and commander of the 52nd Rifle Division in February 1938. He led the division in the Soviet invasion of Poland in September 1939 and in November was placed at the disposal of the Red Army Personnel Directorate. Promoted to kombrig on 4 November and major general on 4 June 1940, Russiyanov was appointed commander of the 100th Rifle Division of the 2nd Rifle Corps of the Western Special Military District (the former Belorussian Military District) in July 1940. He was sent to Moscow in November 1940 to take the Courses of Improvement for Higher Officers (KUVNAS) at the Voroshilov Higher Military Academy, graduating in May 1941 and returning to his command.

== World War II ==
After the beginning of Operation Barbarossa, the German invasion of the Soviet Union, on 22 June 1941, Russiyanov led the division in the Battle of Białystok–Minsk. In late June, after the breakthrough of the 3rd Panzer Group at Minsk, the division became part of the 13th Army, and utilizing the abandoned fortifications of the Minsk Fortified Region, attempted to defend positions against superior German forces, but was forced to retreat to the Berezina near Borisov and further beyond to the Dnieper. The division was surrounded between 9 and 21 July during the Battle of Smolensk and after breaking out was assigned to the 24th Army. In late August and early September, the division fought in the recapture of Yelnya during the Yelnya Offensive. For its actions the division became the 1st Guards Rifle Division, the first Soviet Guards unit. Between September and November the division served with the 21st Army of the Bryansk and later the Southwestern Front, retreating to a line east of Kursk, Kharkov, and Izyum. The division fought in encirclement again between 20 and 28 October. In December, the division fought in the Yelets Offensive and helped recapture Yelets as part of the front operational group of General Fyodor Kostenko.

From March 1942, the 1st Guards were part of the 21st, 38th, and 48th Armies of the Southwestern and Bryansk Fronts, fighting in the directions of Yelets and Voronezh. The division was reorganized as the 1st Guards Mechanized Corps in November and Russiyanov continued in command of the new unit. He was promoted to lieutenant general on 7 June 1943. Between 1943 and 1945 he led the corps as part of the 3rd and 4th Guards Armies of the Southwestern (3rd Ukrainian from 20 October 1943) Front in Operation Little Saturn, the Donbass Strategic Offensive, the Zaporizhia Offensive, the Budapest Offensive, the Balaton Defensive Operation, and the Vienna Offensive.

== Postwar ==
Russiyanov continued in command of the corps after it was reorganized as the 1st Guards Mechanized Division in September 1945. He led the 1st Guards Mechanized Division when it entered Iran for several months during the Iran crisis of 1946. Russiyanov became the deputy commander of the 4th Guards Tank Army of the Group of Soviet Occupation Forces in Germany in June 1946 and continued in that position when the army was reduced to the 4th Guards Cadre Tank Division in January 1947. He studied at the Higher Academic Courses of the Voroshilov Higher Military Academy between April and September 1948, then transferred as a student of the special course. After graduating, Russiyanov was appointed deputy chief of the Directorate of Higher Educational Institutions of the Armored and Mechanized Forces on 27 December 1949. He retired on 13 April 1953 and lived in Moscow. Russiyanov was awarded the title Hero of the Soviet Union and a third Order of Lenin on 21 February 1978 for his "personal courage and heroism" in World War II. He died in Moscow on 21 March 1984 and was buried at the Khimki cemetery.

== Awards and honors ==
Russiyanov was a recipient of the following awards and decorations:

- Hero of the Soviet Union
- Order of Lenin (3)
- Order of the Red Banner (4)
- Order of Kutuzov, 1st class
- Order of Suvorov, 2nd class
