= Korosten railway station =

Railway station in Korosten, Ukraine

Korosten Коростень
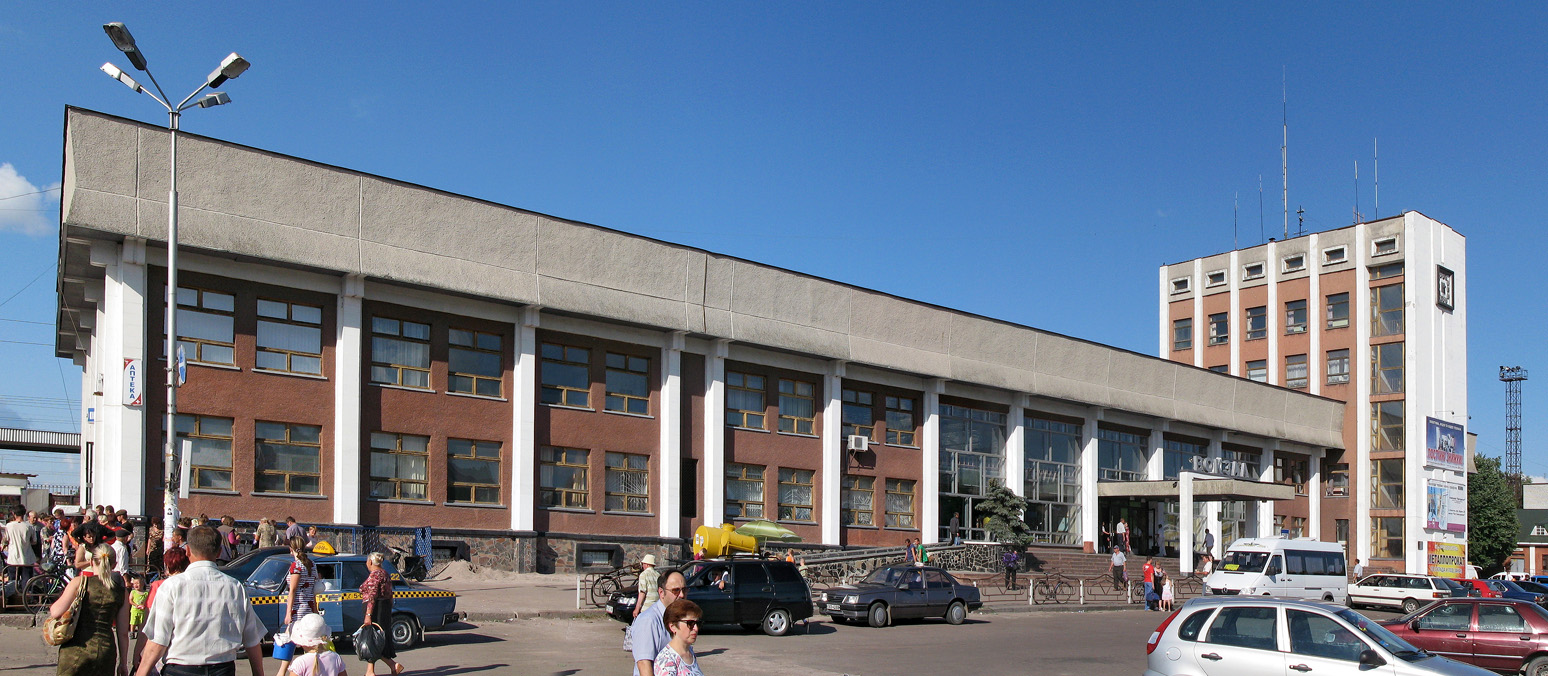

General information
- Location: Korosten', Zhytomyr Oblast, Ukraine, 11500
- Coordinates: 50°57′25″N 28°38′05″E
- System: Southwestern Railway junction
- Owner: Ukrzaliznytsia
- Platforms: 7
- Tracks: 24

Construction
- Structure type: at-grade
- Parking: yes

Other information
- Station code: 346308 (2200110 Express-3)

History
- Opened: 1902
- Rebuilt: 1983
- Electrified: 1983-1985

Services
Preceding station	Ukrzaliznytsia	Following station
Terminus	Southwestern Railways	Drevlyanka
Terminus	Southwestern Railways	Chigyri
Kovelsky Park	Southwestern Railways	Terminus
Location
- Location within Ukraine

Korosten railway station (Ukrainian: Коростенський залізничний вокзал Russian: Железнодорожная станция Коростень) is a railway station in the Ukrainian city of Korosten. An important junction station of the South-Western railway on the Kovel–Kyiv and Kelmenzi–Kalinkawitschy railway lines. The city is served by rail links to the national and regional capitals, as well as cross-border connections to neighboring Belarus. Currently (as of July 2020), the station is served by a single service to/from Kyiv, (one in each direction) on the electrified section of the mainline, with no through services to Zhytomyr.

== History ==
In 1902, through the town of Iskorosten of the Ovruch district of the Volyn province of the Russian Empire, the Kiev - Kovel railway was laid and a railway station was built, in 1905 the first railway station was built at the station (architect A. Kobelev). After the outbreak of the First World War, the importance of the station increased, in 1915–1916. the lines Korosten - Zhitomir and Korosten - Ovruch were built, after which the station turned into a junction station.

On 15 July 1918, the railroad workers of the Korosten railway junction were among the first to start the All-Ukrainian strike of railroad workers. During the civil war, on 26 April 1920 the station was damaged, during the Soviet-Polish war, it was captured by Polish troops but was later rebuilt. During the Great Patriotic War and the German occupation, the station was damaged but was later restored. In 1983, a new station for 700 passengers was built at the Korosten station (architects V. Shvets and V. Grishchenko, engineer L. Mishchenko). Between 1983 and 1985 the station was electrified. In 1986, the locomotive driver of the locomotive depot station Korosten BA Zinchuk (among the first drivers of South-Western Railway has mastered driving heavy and dlinnosostavnyh trains and only during the period 1981–1985. Save 62 tons of diesel fuel, which were held 52 trains) became a laureate of the USSR state prize. In March 1995, the Verkhovna Rada of Ukraine added the Korosten station, as well as the locomotive depot and the carriage depot located at the station, to the list of objects, the privatization of which is prohibited due to their national significance. On 6 March 2022, in the early hours of the morning, the Russian occupiers shelled the area around the railway station. The shelling resulted in the fast night train No. 95 (between Kyiv and Rakhiv) being delayed for almost 3 hours. The train was kept at a safe distance from the shelling, there were no casualties, and the rolling stock was not damaged. On 25 April 2022, the Russian occupiers launched another attack on the Korosten railway station.

== Infrastructure ==
The station is home to a checkpoint on the state border of Ukraine with Belarus, as well as a locomotive and wagon depot, railway engine station No. 122.

On 9 April 2018, a team of electromechanics for the repair of the railway catenary, working in the Korosten power supply distance (a separate unit of the regional branch "South-Western Railway"), at the Korosten station during the given window, installed a sectional insulator (ISM-1M) for electrical separation of sections contact network. This device replaced the physically obsolete isolator of the previous generation.

Insulators of the ISM-1M series are used to divide the electrical contact network into separate operating sections with reliable isolation between them. They also provide a smooth transition of the slides of the current receivers of the electric rolling stock moving under the contact wire at a speed of up to 120 km/h.

== Trains and destinations ==
=== International Routes ===
Train number	Destination	Operated by
005Я/006К	(Russia) Moscow (Kiyevsky)	(Ukraine) Ukrainian Railways
023М/024Ш	(Russia) Moscow (Kiyevsky) (Ukraine) Odesa	(Ukraine) Ukrainian Railways
031К/031Р	(Latvia) Riga	(Belarus) Belarusian Railways (Ukraine) Ukrainian Railways
053А/054К	(Russia) Saint Petersburg (Vitebsky)	(Ukraine) Ukrainian Railways
067К/068Л	(Poland) Warsaw (Centralna)	(Ukraine) Ukrainian Railways
073А/074Л	(Russia) Moscow (Kiyevsky) (Ukraine) Lviv	(Ukraine) Ukrainian Railways
081Д/8862	(Slovakia) Košice	(Ukraine) Ukrainian Railways
086Б/086К	(Belarus) Minsk	(Belarus) Belarusian Railways
094Б/094Ш	(Belarus) Minsk (Ukraine) Odesa	(Ukraine) Ukrainian Railways
117П/380Л	(Romania) Bucharest (North)	(Ukraine) Ukrainian Railways
705К/705Л; 715К/715Л	(Poland) Przemyśl	(Ukraine) Ukrainian Railways
749Д/6302	(Poland) Wrocław	(Poland) PKP (Ukraine) Ukrainian Railways
40147/40749	(Austria) Vienna (Hauptbahnhof)	(Austria) ÖBB

== Gallery ==
Korosten railway station in the morning. The image shows cars of RIC size, diesel locomotives 2M62u and ChME3, electric locomotive ChS4.

== See also ==
- Ukrzaliznytsia - the national railway company of Ukraine

=== Bibliography ===
Юнаков, О. (2016). Архитектор Иосиф Каракис. Алмаз. ISBN 978-1-68082-000-3.
