= 1st Guards Mechanized Corps =

- Active: 1942–1946
- Country: Soviet Union
- Branch: Armoured Forces
- Type: Mechanized Corps
- Role: Breakthrough and Exploitation in Deep Operations
- Size: ca. 19,000–20,000 men 180–220 tanks
- Engagements: Operation Saturn; Battle of Kursk; Battle of Prokhorovka; Lake Balaton Defensive; Vienna Offensive; Prague Offensive
- Battle honours: Vienna

The 1st Guards 'Vienna' Order of Lenin Order of Kutuzov Mechanized Corps was a Red Army armoured formation that saw service during World War II on the Eastern Front. After the war it continued to serve with Soviet occupation forces in Central Europe. It was originally the 1st Guards Rifle Division. The unit had approximately the same size and combat power as an early-war Wehrmacht Panzer Division, or a British Armoured Division during World War II.

It was under the command of General Lieutenant Ivan Russiyanov, and gained the honorifics "Vienna, Voronezh".

In its final form, as the 171st Guards District Training Centre, it was disbanded while being stationed in Tbilisi in 1992.

== History ==
The 1st Guards Mechanized Corps was formed in November 1942 in the Tambov region during the re-establishment of the Mechanized Corps as a formation in the Red Army. It was then assigned to the Southwestern Front which was under the command of General N. F. Vatutin to participate in the encirclement of German Army Group A in Operation Saturn, which was undertaken during the Battle of Stalingrad.

The corps consisted of the following units:

Combat Units

- 1st Guards Mechanized Rifle Brigade
- 2nd Guards Mechanized Rifle Brigade
- 3rd Guards Mechanized Rifle Brigade
- 16th, 17th, 18th, 19th Guards Tank Regiments (combined into the 9th Guards Tank Brigade by 1945)
- 116th Guards Artillery Regiment
- 1504th Guards Anti-Tank Regiment
- 267th Mortar Regiment
- 407th Guards Mortar Battalion

Support Units

- 54th Guards Signalling Battalion
- Corps Train

Changes to unit organization

- The 116th Guards Artillery Regiment had been replaced by the 382nd Guards, 1453rd, and 1821st self-propelled gun regiments by 1945.
- The 1504th Guards Anti-Tank Regiment was no longer with the corps in 1945.
- The 11th Guards Motorcycle Battalion and 1699th Anti-Aircraft Regiment had been added to the corps by 1945.

In 1942, the corps fought in Operation Saturn; in 1943, the Third Battle Of Kharkov, the Battle of Kursk, Operation Polkovodets Rumyantsev, and the Battle of the lower Dnepr, and in 1945, the Battle of Budapest, the Balaton Defensive Operation, and the Vienna Offensive.

Depending on the specific tasks allotted, units from the Reserve of the Supreme High Command (Stavka reserve) could be added to help it achieve its mission. When the 1st Guards Mechanized Corps returned to the front in January 1945, its tank formations were completely equipped with American M4A2 Sherman Lend-Lease tanks.

The Corps had been re-designated the 1st Guards Mechanised Division by March 1946 while at Maragheh in Iran. In April 1946 it moved to Tbilisi in Georgia, in the Transcaucasian Military District. It was then reorganised as the 2nd Guards Motor Rifle Division in 1957, 2nd Guards MR Training in 1960, and then the 16th Guards MRD on 17 November 1964 (Military Unit Number 35695). On 18 August 1968 renamed 100th Guards Training Motorised Rifle Division.

On September 7, 1985, the division was named after Lieutenant General I.N. Russiyanov. On 14 September 1987, the division began to be called the 171st Guards District Training Center (Military Unit Number 30105). In June 1992, after the collapse of the USSR, it was disbanded. Remaining Russian units in Vaziani in Tbilisi gained the designation of the 137th Military Base.

Yet that same month, the battle banner of the division, its honours and awards were transferred to the 212th District Training Centre in Chita, Zabaykalsky Krai, Far Eastern Military District (Military Unit 30672). Up until 1987 the 212th DTC had been the 49th Tank Training Division. With the change, the centre in Chita became the 212th Guards District Training Center "Vienna of the Orders of Lenin and Kutuzov," for junior specialists named after Lieutenant General I.N. Russiyanov.

== Assignment ==
=== 1942 ===
- Southwestern Front
  - 3rd Guards Army

=== 1943 ===
- Southwestern Front

=== 1944 ===
- STAVKA Reserve, later part of the Kharkov Military District

=== 1945 ===
- 3rd Ukrainian Front

== Bibliography ==
- Bonn, K.E. 'Slaughterhouse - The Handbook of the Eastern Front', Aberjona Press
- Erickson, J. 'The Road to Stalingrad'
- Glantz, D. 'From the Don to the Dnepr'
