= Korosten =

City in Zhytomyr Oblast, Ukraine

Korosten Коростень
- City
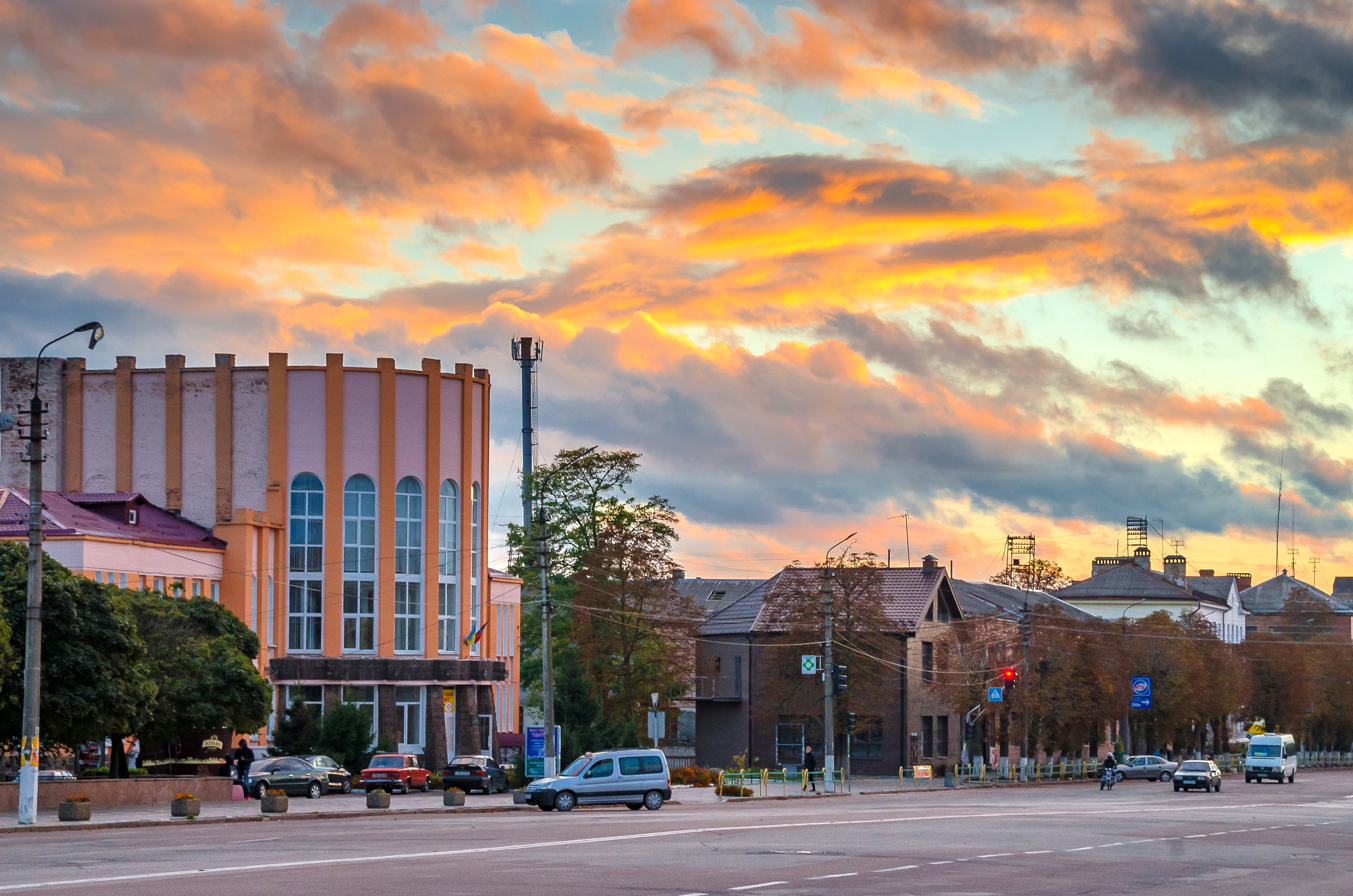
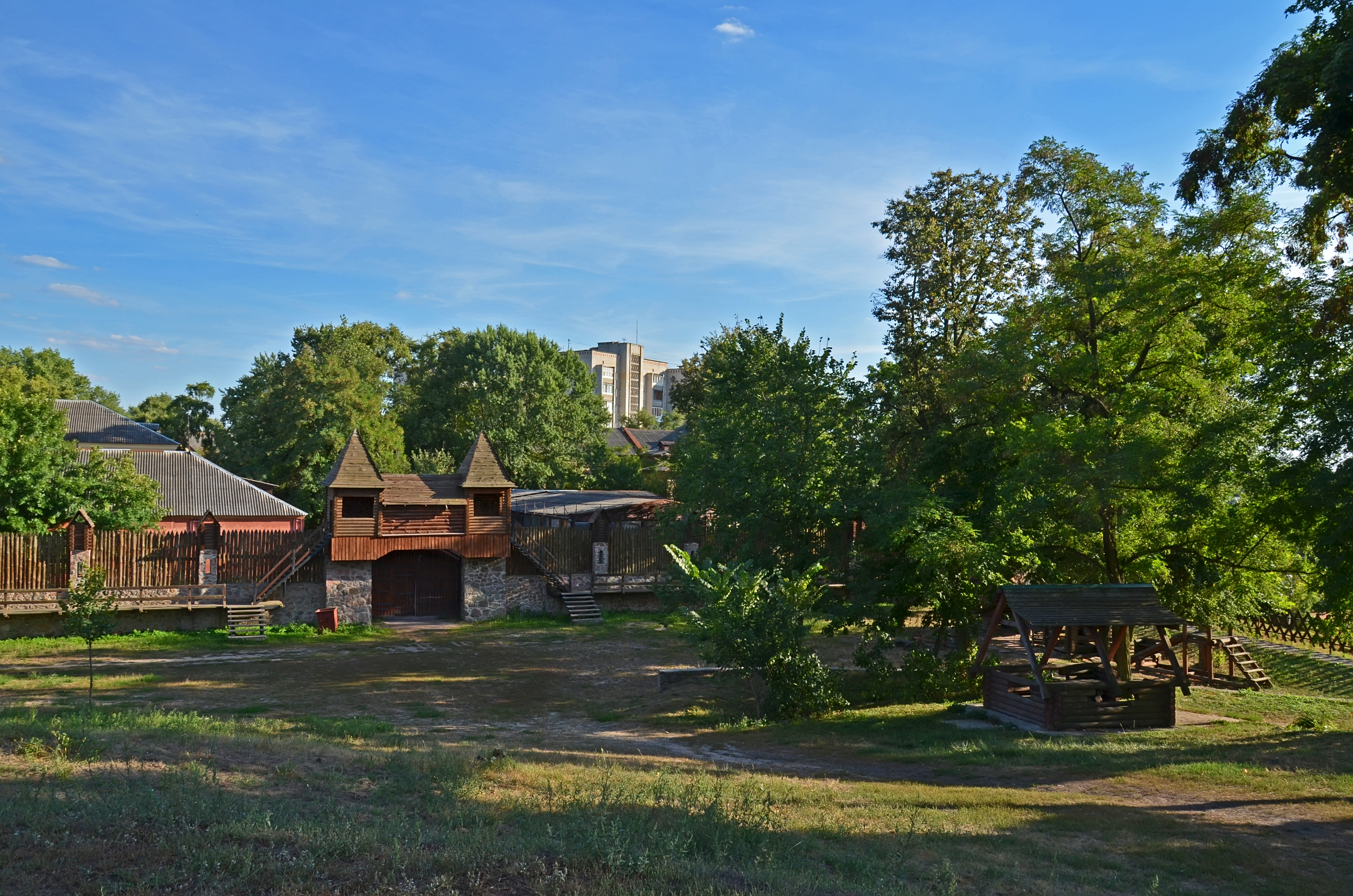
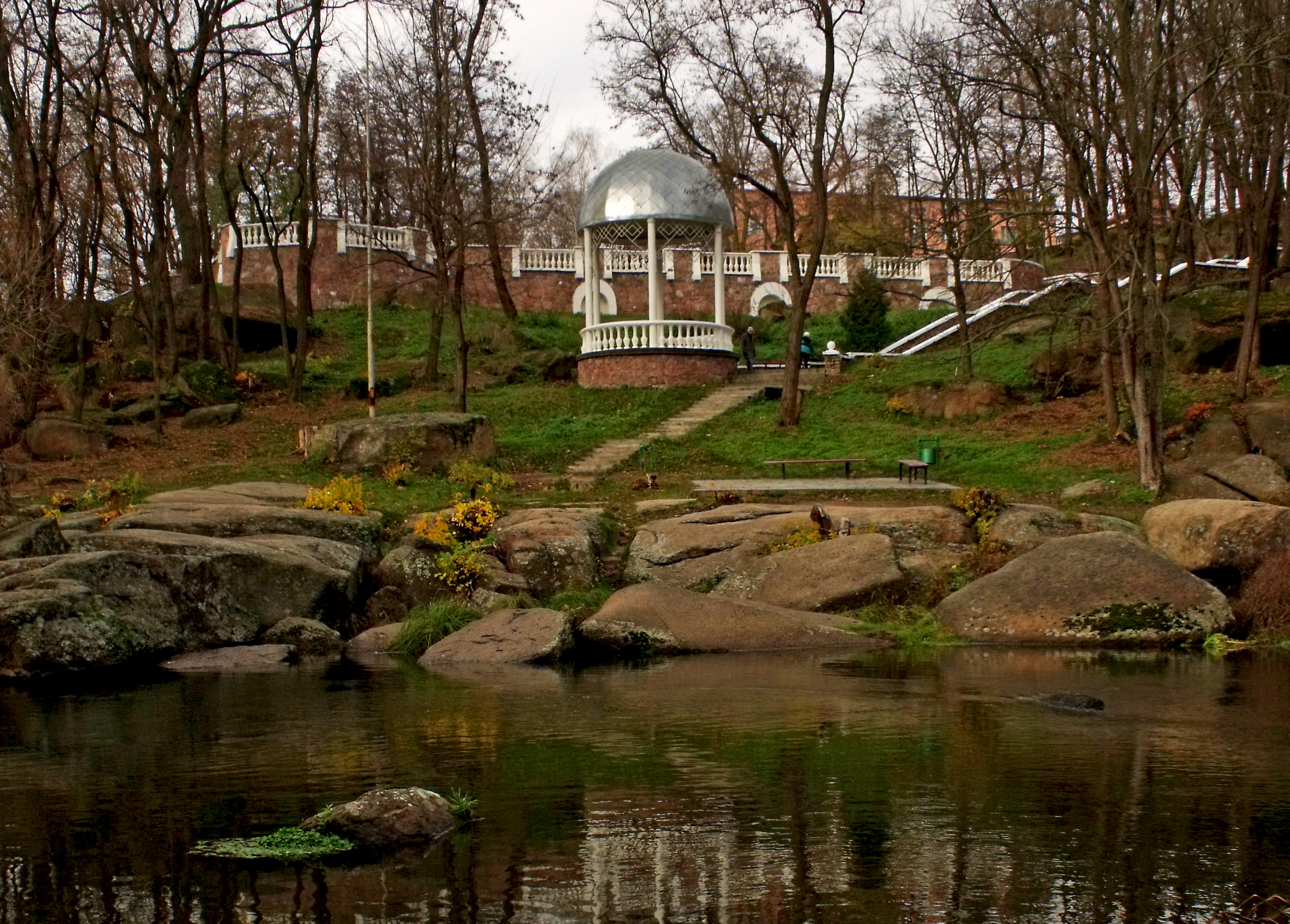
- Clockwise from top: City centre; River Uzh embankment in the city park; Site of ancient Iskorosten

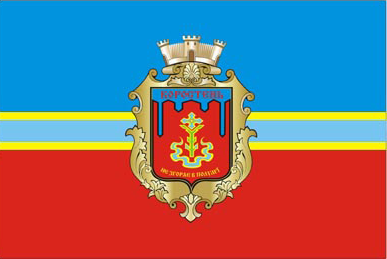
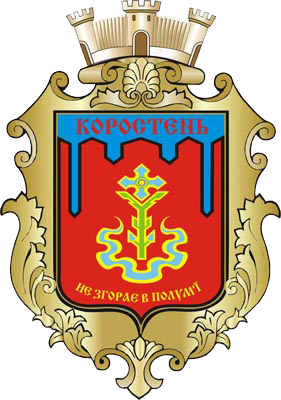
- Flag Coat of arms
- Interactive map of Korosten
- Location of Korosten Korosten (Ukraine)
- Coordinates: 50°57′N 28°38′E
- Country: Ukraine
- Oblast: Zhytomyr Oblast
- Raion: Korosten Raion
- Hromada: Korosten urban hromada
- First mentioned: 945
- Charter granted: 1589
- City Status: 1 January 1926
- City council: Korosten City Council

Government
  - Mayor: Volodymyr Moskalenko

Area
  - Total: 42.31 km^{2} (16.34 sq mi)
- Elevation: 171 m (561 ft)

Population (2022)
  - Total: 61,496
  - Density: 1,453/km^{2} (3,764/sq mi)
- Time zone: UTC+2 (EET)
  - Summer (DST): UTC+3 (EEST)
- Postal code: 01xxx–04xxx
- Area code: +380 44
- FIPS code: UP27
- Vehicle registration plate: AМ
- Website: Official website

Korosten (Ukrainian: Коростень, pronounced [ˈkɔrostenʲ]), also historically known as Iskorosten (Іскоростень), is a historic city and a large transport hub in Zhytomyr Oblast, northern Ukraine. It is located on the Uzh River. Korosten serves as the administrative center of Korosten Raion. As of January 2022, Korosten's population was approximately 61,496.

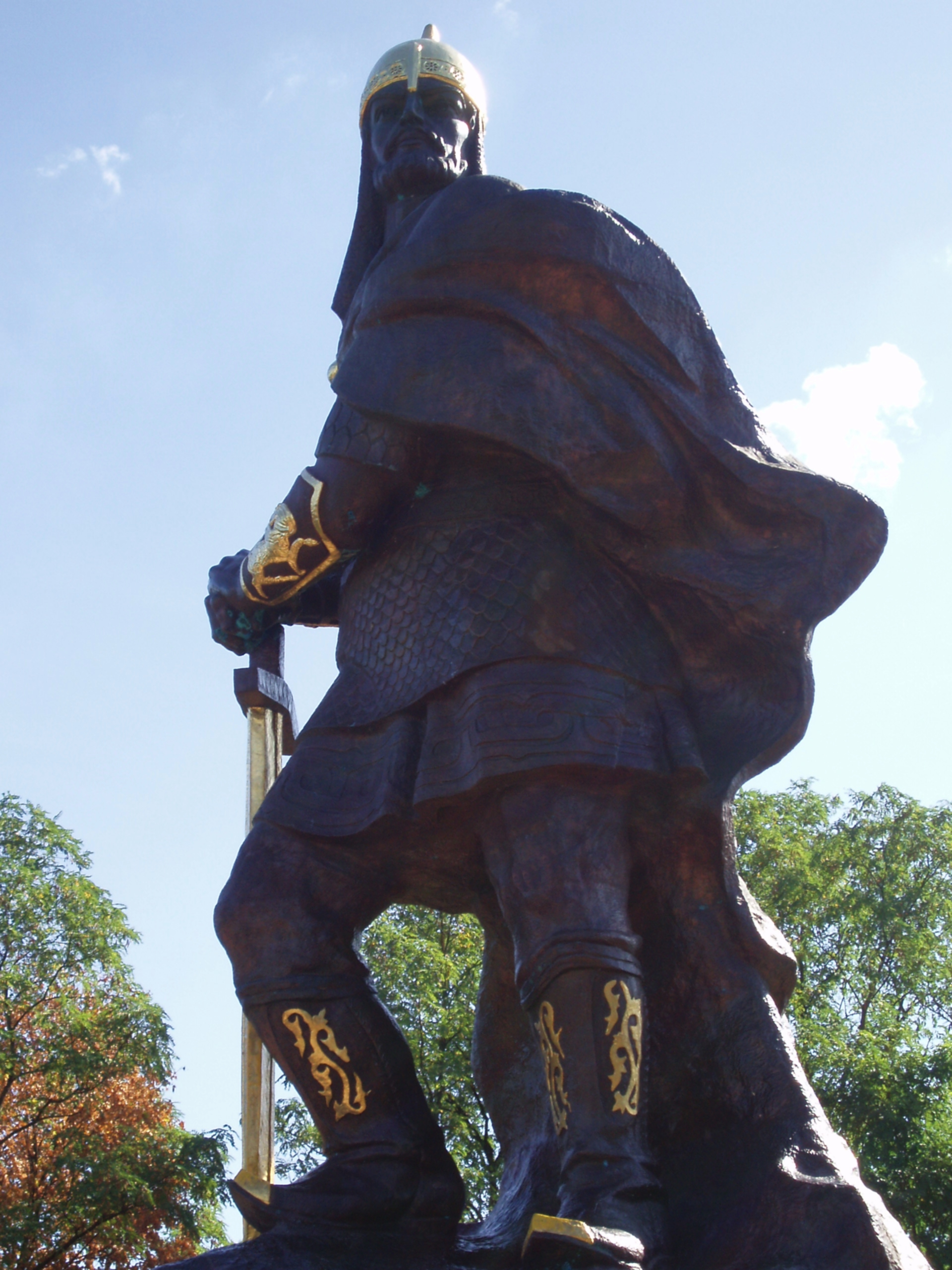
Monument to knyaz Mal in Korosten

== Name ==
There are different theories about the origin of the name of the city.

The name may be derived from the word korost, 'brushwood, bushes, shrubbery'; the form Iskorosten sometimes found in early sources is probably based on the common repetition of prepositions in Old East Slavic: iz grada iz... 'from the city from...'.

Another theory holds that the city was built entirely of wood, and its walls were surrounded by an oak fence, unhewn, with bark, leading to the name Is-koro-sten, i.e. the city "from bark on the wall" in Ukrainian.

Alternatively, the city might have been named after the sun god Khors/Xors - the main god of many tribes that inhabited the area, including the Drevlians. According to this theory, the names of the settlements of Korsun and Korostyshiv also come from Khors/Xors.

== History ==
=== Early history ===
Historical affiliations

Kievan Rus' 879-1097
Principality of Kiev 1097–1240
Golden Horde 1240–1363
Grand Duchy of Lithuania 1363–1569
Polish–Lithuanian Commonwealth 1569–1649
Cossack Hetmanate 1649-1667
Polish–Lithuanian Commonwealth 1667-1795
Russian Empire 1795–1917
(Russia) Russian Republic 1917
Various Ukrainian states 1917–1920
Soviet Ukraine 1920–1922
Soviet Union 1922–1991 (Occupied by Nazi Germany between 1941-1943)
Ukraine 1991–present

The city was founded over a millennium ago and was the capital of the Drevlians, an ancient Slavic tribe (later incorporated into Kievan Rus′).

=== The Rus' ===
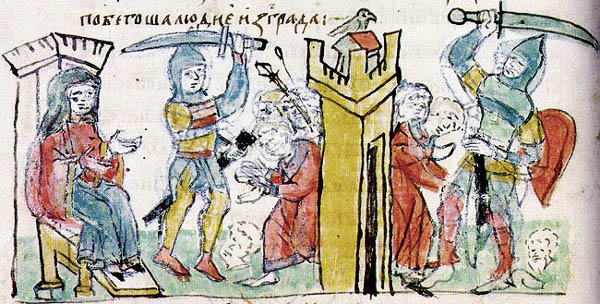
Fourth revenge of Olga: The Burning of Iskorosten from the Radziwiłł Chronicle (Unknown Artist)

In 945, Igor of Kiev, ruler of the Kievan Rus, was killed while collecting tribute from the Drevlians in Iskorosten. According to 10th century Byzantine historian and chronicler, Leo the Deacon: "They [Drevlians] had bent down two birch trees to the prince's feet and tied them to his legs; then they let the trees straighten again, thus tearing the prince's body apart." The Primary Chronicle blames Igor's death on his own excessive greed, indicating that he tried to collect tribute for the second time in a month.

Igor's widow, Olga of Kiev, as regent on behalf of their son Svyatoslav. avenged his death by punishing the Drevlians. Olga then led her army to Iskorosten. The siege lasted for a year without success when Olga thought of a plan to trick the Drevlians. She sent them a message: "Why do you persist in holding out? All your cities have surrendered to me and submitted to tribute so that the inhabitants now cultivate their fields and their lands in peace. But you had rather a tide of hunger without submitting to the tribute." The Drevlians responded that they would submit to tribute but that they were afraid she was still intent on avenging her husband. Olga answered that the murder of the messengers sent to Kyiv, as well as the events of the feast night, had been enough for her. She then asked them for a small request: "Give me three pigeons...and three sparrows from each house." The Drevlians rejoiced at the prospect of the siege ending for so small a price and did as she asked.

Olga then instructed her army to attach a piece of sulphur bound with small pieces of cloth to each bird. At nightfall, Olga told her soldiers to set the pieces aflame and release the birds. They returned to their nests within the city, which subsequently set the city ablaze. As the Primary Chronicle tells it: "There was not a house that was not consumed, and it was impossible to extinguish the flames because all the houses caught fire at once." As the people fled the burning city, Olga ordered her soldiers to catch them, killing some of them and giving the others as slaves to her followers. She left the remnant to pay tribute. As a result of this Olga changed the system of tribute gathering (poliudie) in what may be regarded as the first legal reform recorded in Eastern Europe.

In 968 the nomadic Pechenegs attacked outlying regions of the Rus and then besieged the city.

=== The Middle Ages ===
After the partition of Rus in 1097, Iskorosten remained under the jurisdiction of the Kyivan princes. In December 1240, the Mongol invasion of Rus', led by Batu Khan, sacked and burned many cities and settlements in the region of Iskorosten. From 1243, the Mongol-Tatars, in the form of the Golden Horde (the western section of the Mongol Empire), ruled. After victories over the Tatars at the Battle of Blue Waters in 1362 (or 1363) the Grand Duke of Lithuania Algirdas annexed these lands to the Grand Duchy of Lithuania. Later he presented them to one of his knights Terekha from Bryansk for faithful service. From 1385, after the formation of the Union of Krewo, this territory came under the influence of Poland.

=== Early Modern Period ===
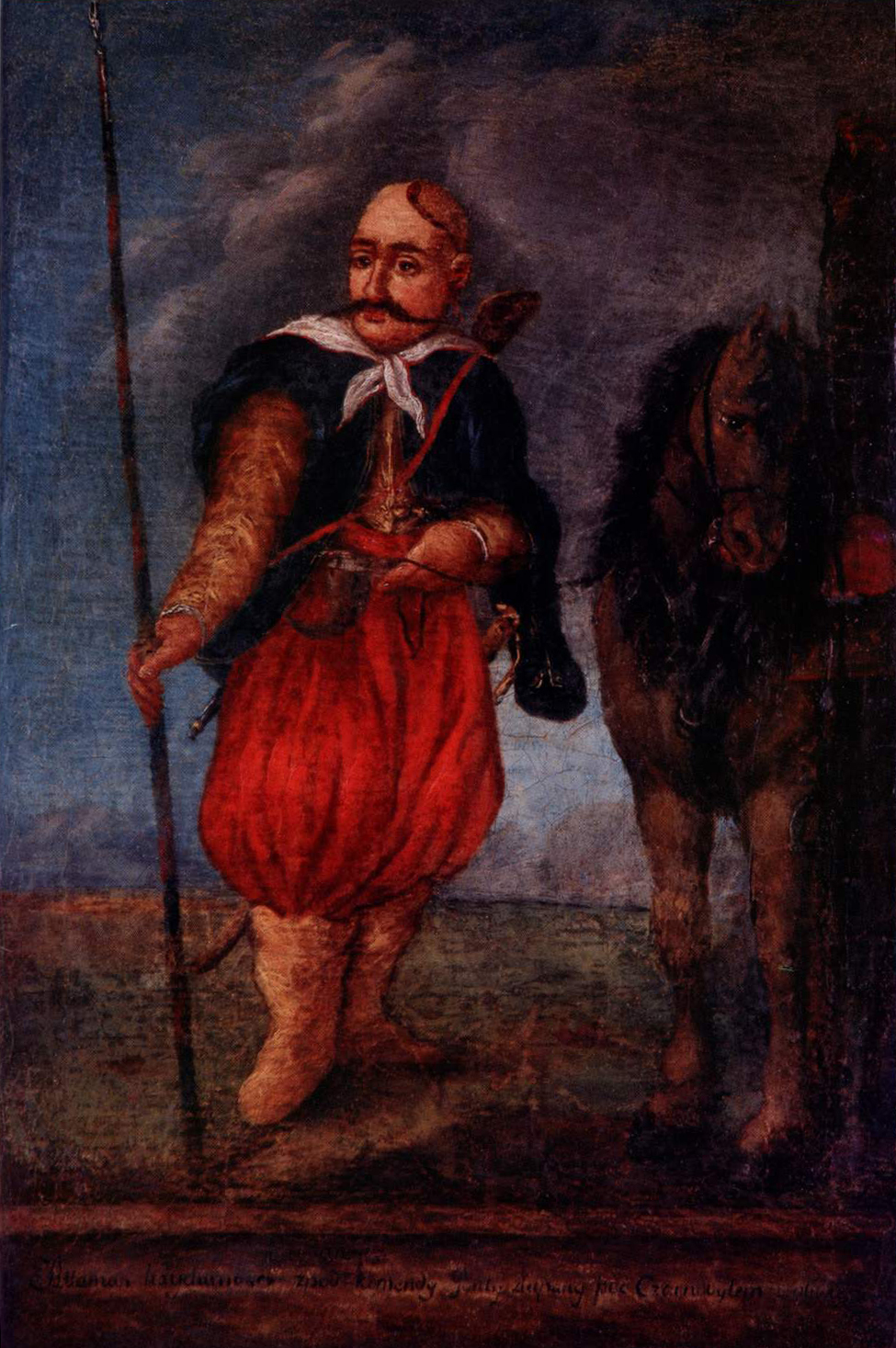
Haydamak leader Ivan Bondarenko

In 1586, a powerful Polish magnate, Prokop Mrzewicki, married one of Terekh's heiresses and became the owner of Iskorosten. He managed to persuade the Polish king to grant this small walled settlement the status of a city. On 22 May 1589, King Sigismund III granted the city of Iskorosten its first charter.

In 1649, during the Khmelnytsky Uprising, a detachment of Cossacks led by Geraski laid siege to the city. After a bloody battle, the Cossacks captured Iskorosten from the Polish defenders, and the city's fortifications were completely destroyed during the assault. In 1654, Hetman Bohdan Khmelnytsky, as a result of the Pereyaslav Rada, signed an agreement with Tsar Alexei Mikhailovich on the transition of Ukraine to Russian jurisdiction. However, from 1667 to 1795, the lands surrounding Iskorosten continued to be part of the Polish–Lithuanian Commonwealth. In 1768, during the uprising of Zaporozhian and Uman Cossacks uprising led by Maksym Zalizniak and Ivan Gonta respectfully, Ukrainian haidamak leader Ivan Bondarenko of Kriukivshchyna intended to storm Korosten and incorporate it into his territory. However, the uprising was crushed, and his intentions were never realized.

=== Russian Imperial Period ===
After the Third Partition of the Polish–Lithuanian Commonwealth in 1795, Iskorosten passed into the Russian Empire as the centre of the Iskorosten parish of the Ovruch district of the Volyn province. For a long time, it was a quiet, inconspicuous provincial town. The construction of the 417-km Kyiv-Kovel railway in 1902 allowed the town to grow, becoming a major railway junction. In 1904 a porcelain factory opened, further industrialising the town. In 1917 the town was renamed Korosten.

=== Civil War ===
On 10 June 1917, the Ukrainian Central Council declared its autonomy as part of the Russian Republic by its First Universal at the All-Ukrainian Military Congress. After the proclamation of the Ukrainian People's Republic (UPR), its government and parliament were forced to leave Kyiv during its occupation by Bolshevik troops.

In November 1917, Soviet authority was established in the city, but later Korosten was occupied by the advancing Austro-German troops The German army would remain in Ukraine until November 1918.

The Ukrainian Central Council were in Korosten during 14–15 February and 24–26 February 1918. On 25 February, the Tryzub or Trident of St. Vladimir was approved as the emblem of the Ukrainian People's Republic by a resolution of the Central Rada. Between 14 and 27 February 1918, units of the UPR Army have stationed in Korosten at various times.

The Red Army took it in February 1918, followed by the Army of the German Empire in March; Ukrainian forces retook the city in December. During February 1919 the Red Army regained control; in August, it was taken first by Symon Petlura's men and then by Denikin's army. The Soviets regained control in December 1919. On the eve of Kyiv offensive Korosten lay on the frontlines between the Polish and Soviet Forces. On 27 February 1921 The Haydamatsky Kish of the Ukrainian People's Republic led by Symon Petliura, a separate Zaporizhzhya detachment led by Konstantin Prisovsky, and a unit of Sich Riflemen led by Yevhen Konovalets passed through Korosten, heading for Kyiv, in an attempt to recapture it from Bolshevik troops.

On 7 November 1921, during the November raid, Korosten, occupied by units of the 395th Rifle Regiment of the 132nd Brigade of the 44th Rifle Division of the Moscow Troops, attempted to capture the Volyn Group commander Yuriy Tyutyunnyk of the UPR Insurgent Army. The beginning of the counteroffensive was successful. Ukrainian troops, unexpectedly attacking Korosten, captured the railway station. However, the inconsistency in the actions of different units and the large numerical advantage of the Soviet units did not allow UPR to capitalise on this advantage, and the Ukrainian troops were forced to retreat from the city. Captain Volodymyr Stefanyshyn was killed during the withdrawal, however Ivan Rembolovych, Semen Khmara-Kharchenko and Mykola Tobilevych were decorated for their actions.

=== Interwar period ===
In 1926, Korosten received city status. In October 1926, with the permission of the authorities and under the supervision of the OGPU, a conference of the rabbis of the Volyn province was held in Korosten, which actually had an all-Ukrainian, and partly all-Union character; which adopted a decree on counteracting atheistic propaganda.

The city suffered from the man-made famine Holodomor of 1932-1933. In 2008, the National Museum of the Holodomor Genocide published the National Book of Memory of the Victims of the Holodomor of 1932–1933 in Ukraine. Zhytomyr region. The book has 1116 pages and consists of three sections. According to historical records, more than 2288 people died during Holodomor in 1932–1933.

In 1936, the city had a population 28,000, a porcelain factory, a metalworking factory "Oktyabrskaya Kuznitsa", car repair shops and a municipal power plant with a capacity of 20 kW operated here.

=== World War II ===
During the initial invasion of the Soviet Union as part of Army Group South the 62nd Infantry Division (part of XVII Army Corps under 6th Army) advanced towards Korosten. Soviet forces initially held out on the vital railhead to Kyiv with heavy artillery. Generalfeldmarschall von Reichenau, commander of the 6th Army reported

"The railway junction... was defended by Soviet forces with bitter determination, and it fell... only after hard fighting"

Soviet forces initially held out on the vital railhead to Kyiv with heavy artillery. When the Soviet forces were forced to retreat northeast to Kyiv in early August 1941, the 6th Army moved in. Korosten was occupied by the German Army from 7 August 1941 to 28 December 1943 (it was briefly captured by 60th Army forces during the Kyiv offensive on 17 November 1943, but retreated after a strong German counterattack). It was during the occupation that nationalists, Liked to OUN-Bandera faction of the Ukrainian Insurgent Army and working under the auspices of German Security Police and the Einsatzgruppen compiled lists of targets for the branch offices of the KdS and assisted with the roundups of Jewish families and other ‘Non-desirables’. In Korosten nationalists carried out the killings by themselves, same as reported in Sokal. During the war, Korosten was once again completely destroyed. On 28 December 1943, during the Zhitomir–Berdichev Offensive, the city was liberated by units of the 13th Army of Lieutenant General Pukhov.

==== The Holocaust ====
In 1939, the Jewish population of Korosten was 10,991 (36% of its total population). On 10 August 1941 (3 days after Wehrmacht forces entered the city), 53 Jews were rounded up and shot in the city. The German military administration formed a city government with auxiliary Ukrainian police. The latter was formed out of the local citizens and took an active part in all "Jewish actions". On 20 August, another 160 Jewish civilians were shot. On 27 August, 238 Jews were executed, and on 10 September 1941, about a thousand Jewish men, women and children were killed. In late October 1941, the power passed to the German Civil administration. Korosten became an administrative centre of the gebiet, a part of the larger Zhitomir general district, Reichskommissariat Ukraine. Soon after the occupation of Korosten "a Jewish residential area" (an open ghetto) was formed. In total, over 6,000 Korosten Jews were killed between 1941 and 1942. Other killings in central Ukraine soon followed.

=== Post 1945 ===
After the war, a massive rebuilding programme was undertaken. In 1971, a 600-seat club was built for the citizens.

On 26 April 1986, the nearby Chornobyl Nuclear Power Plant suffered a containment breach in No. 4 reactor. After the nuclear incident in Chornobyl, which is around 90 kilometres away, it suffered considerable fallout. In May 1986, The city was classified as a "zone of guaranteed voluntary resettlement." In addition, the city's economy suffered greatly from the crisis in the first years after Ukraine's independence and the move to free-market economics.

=== Independence ===
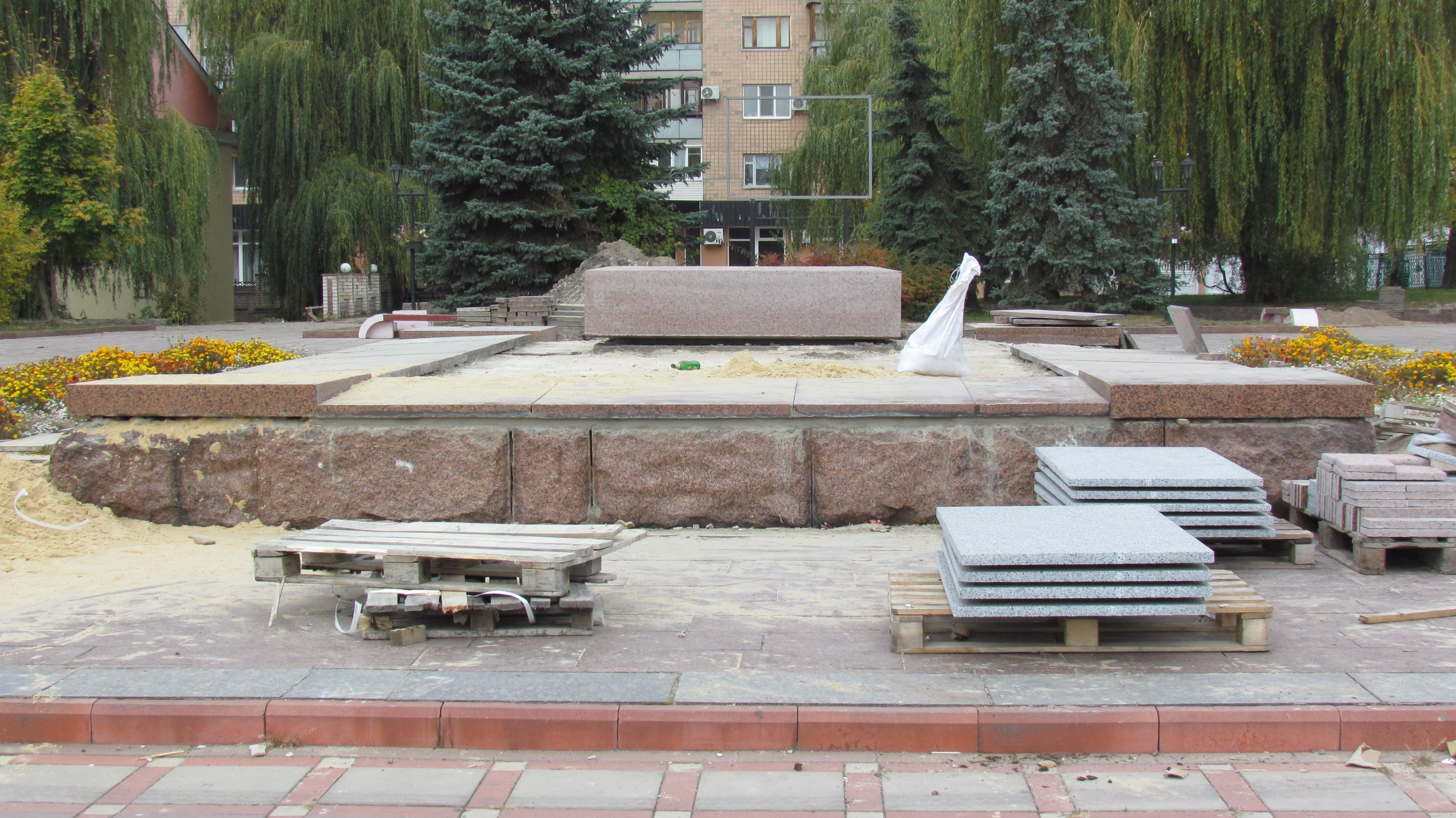
The Remains of Lenin monument after it was toppled in 2014

In 2006, Korosten became one of the six cities in Ukraine that received a quality certificate according to international standards ISO 9001: 2000. Viktor Vasylchuk, a well-known Ukrainian writer, Honored Journalist of Ukraine, and editor-in-chief of the Vecherniy Korosten newspaper was born, lives, and works in Korosten.

In 2014, the Lenin statue, which stood on Main Street (and just off to the right of the city's government building) which had survived the end of the USSR was toppled. It was one of 552 monuments demolished during the 2013-2014 period. Today the plinth remains, but with no statue atop of it.

On 28 February, as the 2022 Russian invasion of Ukraine began, an emergency meeting was held by the city from the Department of Civil Protection to the operation of electric sirens On 5 March reports suggest Russians troops were on the outskirts of Malyn (57.3 km from Korosten).

== Symbols of the city ==
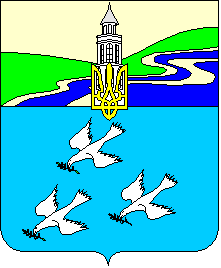
Coat of arms of Radomyshl with a plot from the history of Korosten

The flag of the city of Korosten is a panel with two horizontal stripes of the same width. The upper stripe is blue, the lower stripe is red. The stripes are separated by a symbolic image of the Uzh River - a stripe 0.16 times the width of the flag. The stripe repeats the color scale of the symbolic image of the Uzh River on the city's coat of arms: the middle of the river is blue (0.1 width of the flag), the banks are golden (0.03 width of the flag). The ratio of the width of the flag to its length is 2 to 3. The blue colour of the field of the flag's cloth symbolizes the greatness and beauty of the ancient city. The red color of the flag field symbolizes the bravery and courage of the Drevlian defenders of the city in 946 when Princess Olga laid siege to Korosten, and the defenders of the Korosten fortified area No. 5 in 1941 during the Great Patriotic War.

The new coat of arms of the city of Korosten was developed, taking into account the composition of the previous coat of arms. The old coat of arms of the city was a blue French shield, in the heart of which there is a red shield, the main field of which is reserved for the depiction of a dark red fortress wall. Against the background of the fortress wall, a green stem of flax is depicted, which symbolizes the nature of Polissya; a four-petal red flower symbolizes ancient settlements that were located on both sides of the Uzh River and protected each other. A flax flower wraps around the river Uzh, blue in color with golden banks. On the head of the shield, there is the name of the city KOROSTEN, separated from the middle shield by a golden stripe. The shield and visor are framed with gold edging. The new coat of arms repeats the main composition of the old coat of arms, only a blue flax flower and a blue field above the fortress wall. The shield is framed by a cartouche, adopted in the modern heraldry of Ukrainian cities. The cartouche is crowned with an urban modernized golden three-tower crown. The modernized heraldic crown has wooden walls instead of stone walls, which were used during the Drevliansky principality. In the blue field of the heraldic shield above the fortress wall, the name of the city is written in Cyrillic letters, "KOROSTEN". The motto "DOES NOT BURN IN A FLAME" is written at the foot of the shield.

The coat of arms of the city is strictly historical for Radomyshl (the history of the burning of the city of Korosten by Princess Olga is shown in the coat of arms of another city).

== Economy ==
Korosten Industrial Park (KIP) is an industrial zone within the city with a total area of 246 hectares (0.94 sq mi). Conceptual design of the park was developed by Czech design bureau DHV. The project envisages the creation of the territory of the KIP high-tech enterprises, enterprises of light and medium industrial production – the assembly, integration, surface processing, light engineering and electrical industries.

The project is designed for 10 years and is divided into three phases:

- Conduct communications: roads, railway, electricity, water supply, sanitation; construction and commissioning of the plant manufacturing medium-density fibreboard (MDF) boards;
- Construction and commissioning of small and medium industrial enterprises (perspective)
- Construction and development of logistic center (perspective)

By October 2010 all communications are already conducted. Construction of a plant manufacturing MDF boards is almost complete. This plant will become the first manufacturer of MDF boards in Ukraine.

== Transport ==
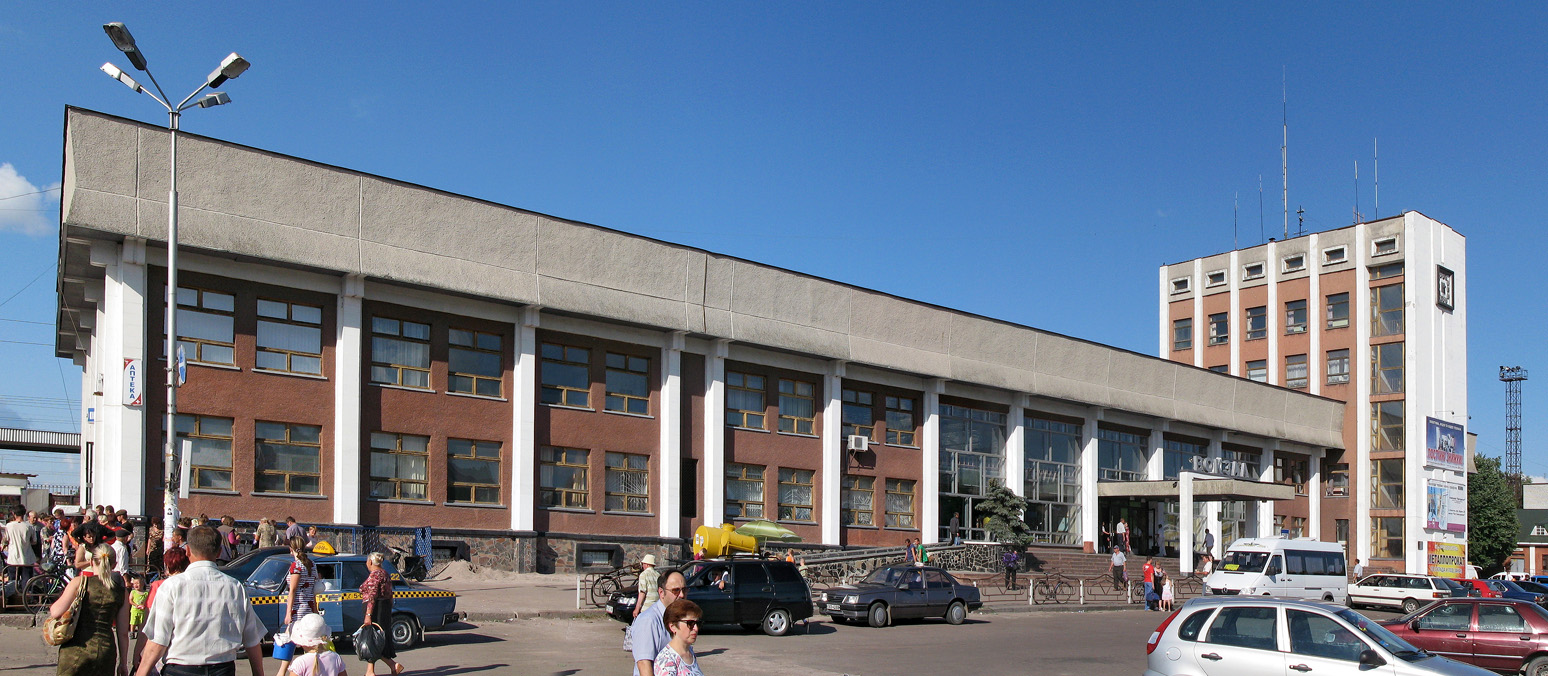
Korosten Railway station

=== Rail ===
Korosten is an important railway junction on the Kovel-Kyiv and Kelmenzi-Kalinkawitschy railway lines. The city is served by rail links to the national and regional capitals, as well as cross-border connections to neighbouring Belarus. The station and track are part of Southwestern Railways (PZZ), (a component part of the Ukrainian Railways). Currently (as of July 2020), the station is served by a single service to/from Kyiv, (one in each direction) on the electrified section of the mainline, with no through services to Zhytomyr. Almost all trains from Western Ukraine to Kyiv pass through the city, and there is a constant movement of suburban trains in the following directions:

- Korosten — Malyn — Kyiv
- Korosten — Zvyagel — Shepetivka
- Korosten — Zhytomyr — Berdychiv — Kozyatyn — Vinnytsia
- Korosten — Luhyny — Bilokorovychy — Olevsk
- Korosten — Ovruch — Berezhest — Vystupovychi
- Korosten — Ovruch — Velidniki

There are also regular bus routes in these directions that leave from the railway station and the bus station.

=== Road ===
M 21 E583 trunk road crossing Ukraine from east to west runs North of the city.

Some other roads:

- M 07 E373 connecting the cities Roman and Zhytomyr (through Vinnytsia)

== People ==
According to the 2001 census, the ethnic composition of Korosten is as follows: 89% — Ukrainian, 7,5% — Russian, 1,5% — Pole, 0,6% — Belarusian, 0,5% — Jews.

=== Population ===
1939	1959	1979	1989	2001	2025
30,806	38,041	65,333	72,367	66,669	56,073

=== Population distribution by native language (2001) ===
Ukrainian	Russian
86.69 %	12.73 %

== Potato pancakes festival ==
The international potato pancakes (Ukrainian: деруни, romanized: deruny) festival is held annually on the third Saturday of September in the city park since 2008.

During the festival, competitions in "potato pancakes triathlon" are held. The triathlon includes such contests:

- "Potato pancakes powerlifting": squat with two heavy jugs full of pancakes;
- Throwing potato pancakes in a bowl with sour cream with 5 meters (16.4 ft);
- Throwing potato pancakes to the competitor with 5 meters (16.4 ft).

There is a potato pancakes school at the festival, where experienced cooks teach everyone to cook the pancakes.

However, the main intrigue of the festival is the competition for the tastiest pancake. The jury determines the winner. For a few hryvnias each taster can get a patent and thus become a member of the jury.

Various competitions, exhibitions, tastings of traditional Polesian beverages, and performances by folk music ensembles are usually conducted.

== Twin towns – sister cities ==
Korosten is twinned with:

- Anenii Noi, Moldova (2006)
- Kraśnik, Poland (2007)
- Sloviansk, Ukraine (2014)
- Svitlovodsk, Ukraine (2005)
- Volodymyr, Ukraine
- Bourges, France (2022)
- Wabash, Indiana, United States of America (2023)

== Gallery ==
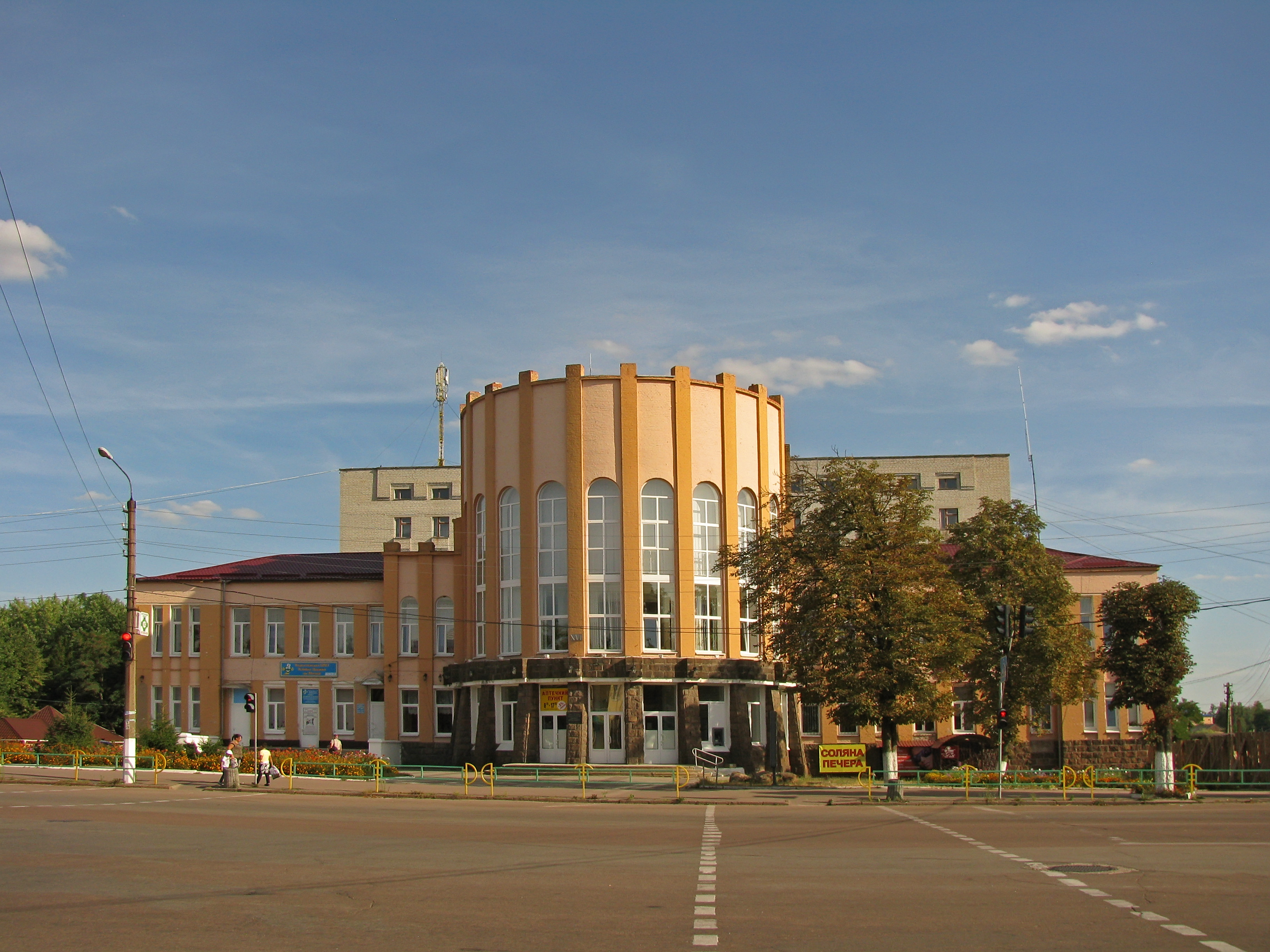
Children's clinic in Korosten

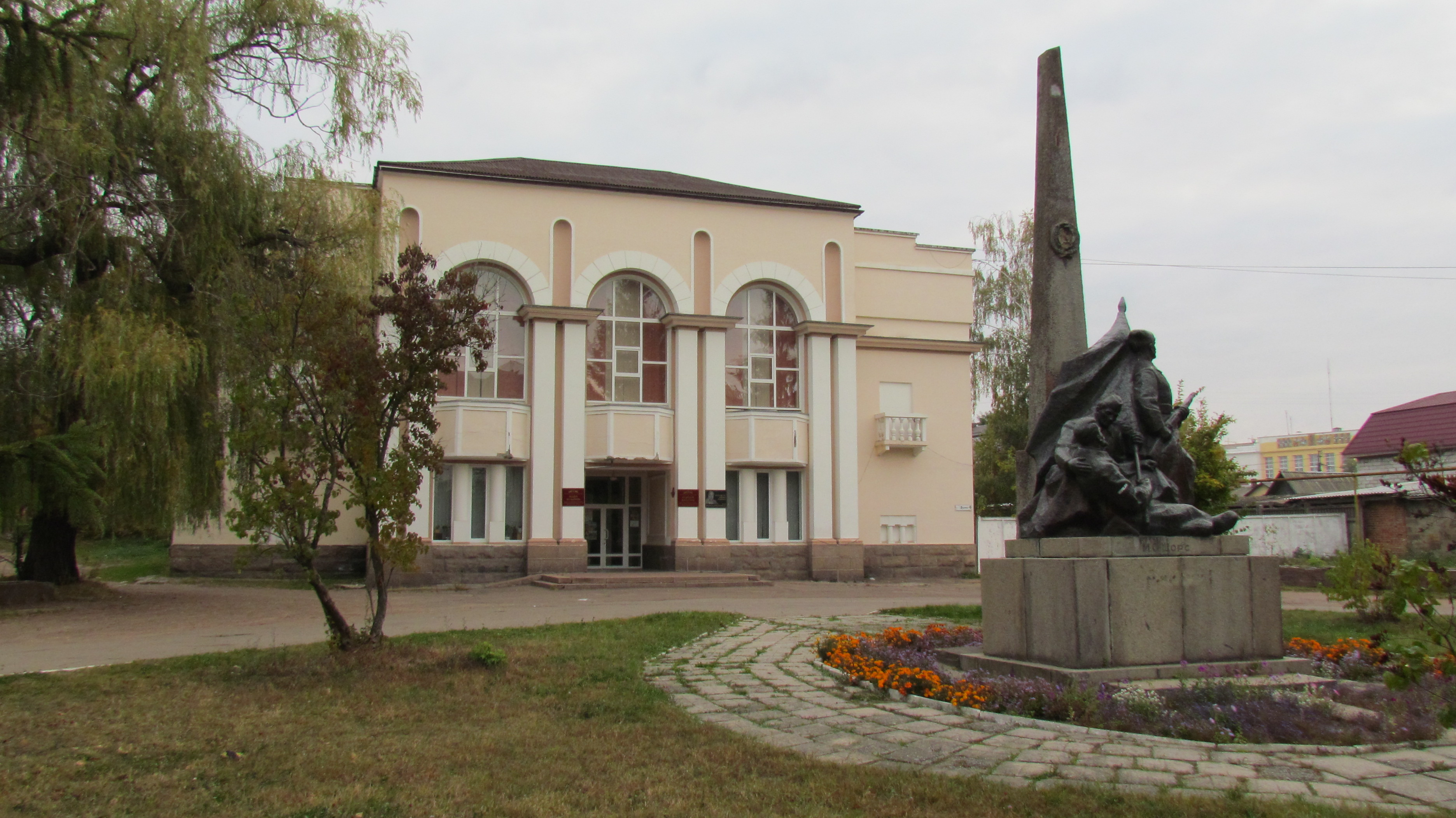
Public library

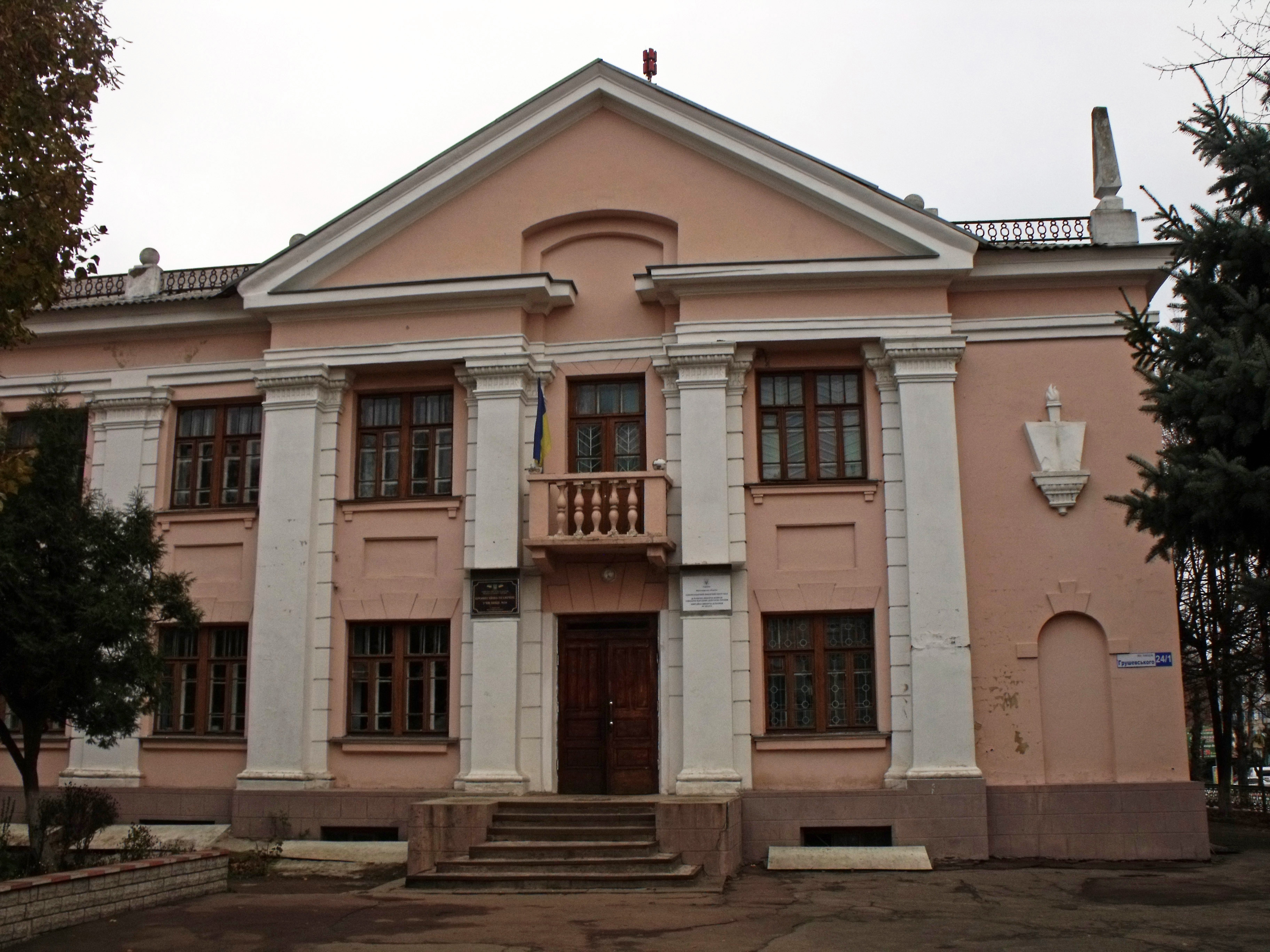
Vocational school in Korosten

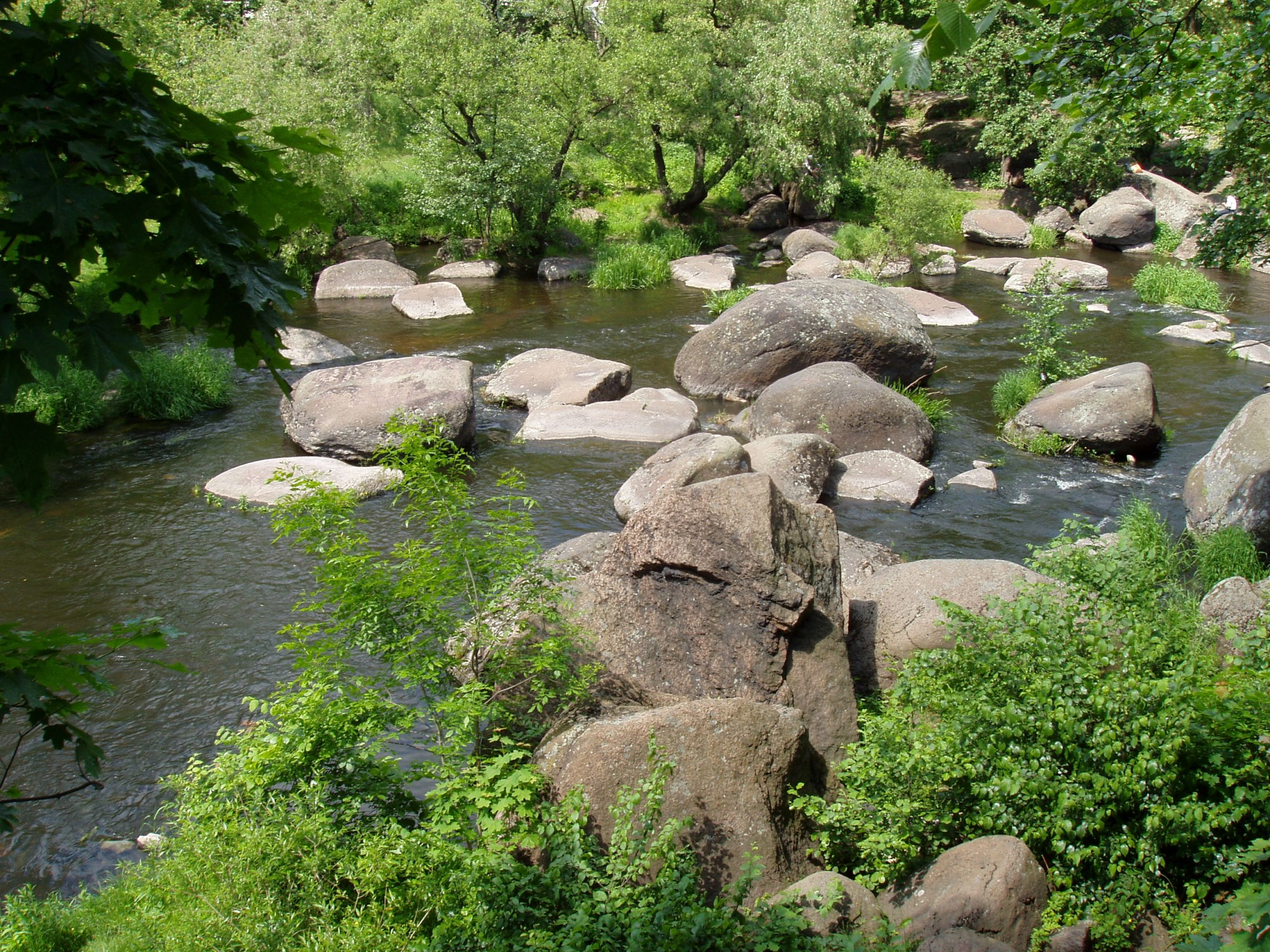
River Uzh in the city park

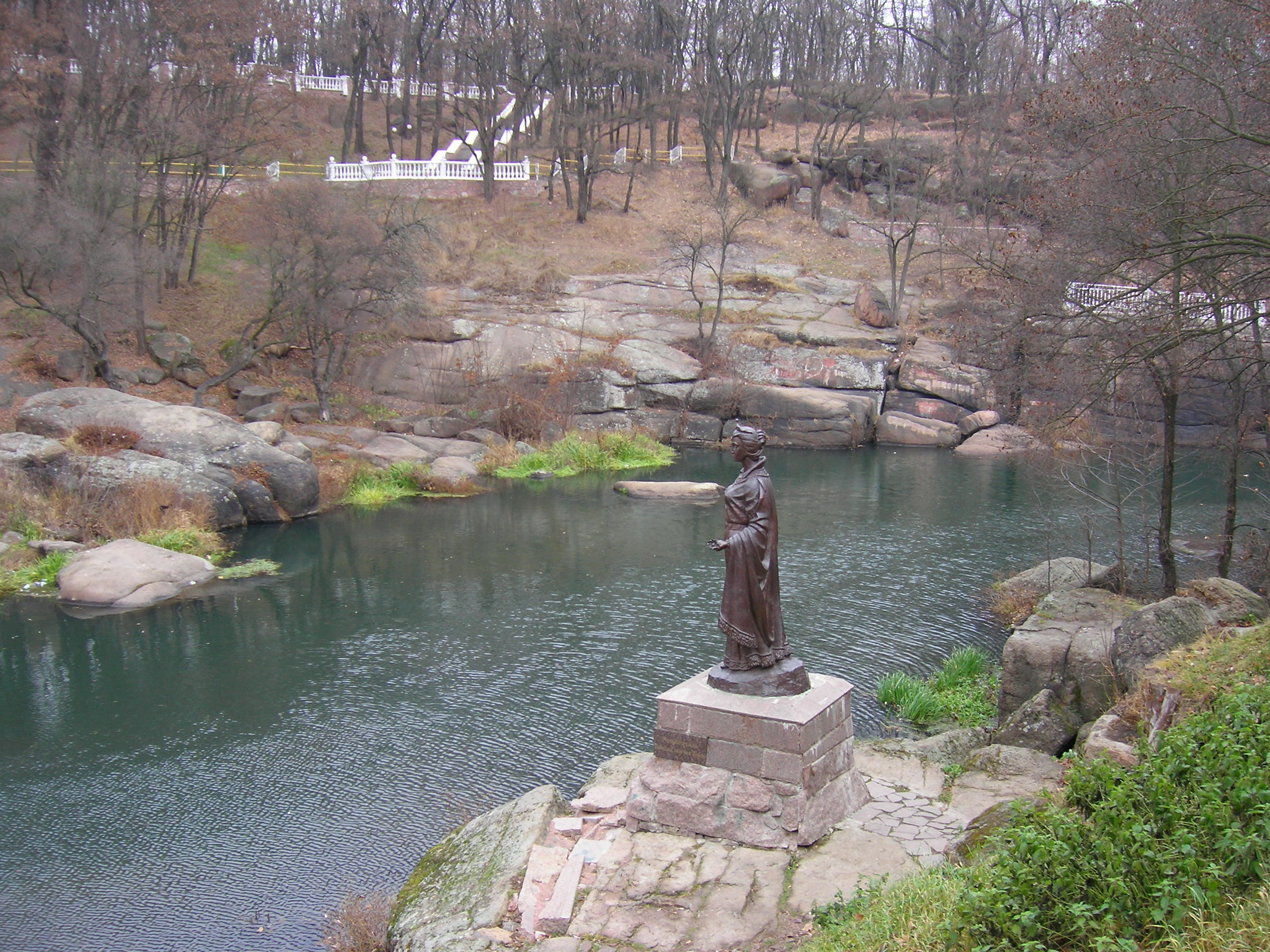
Bath of Princess Olga

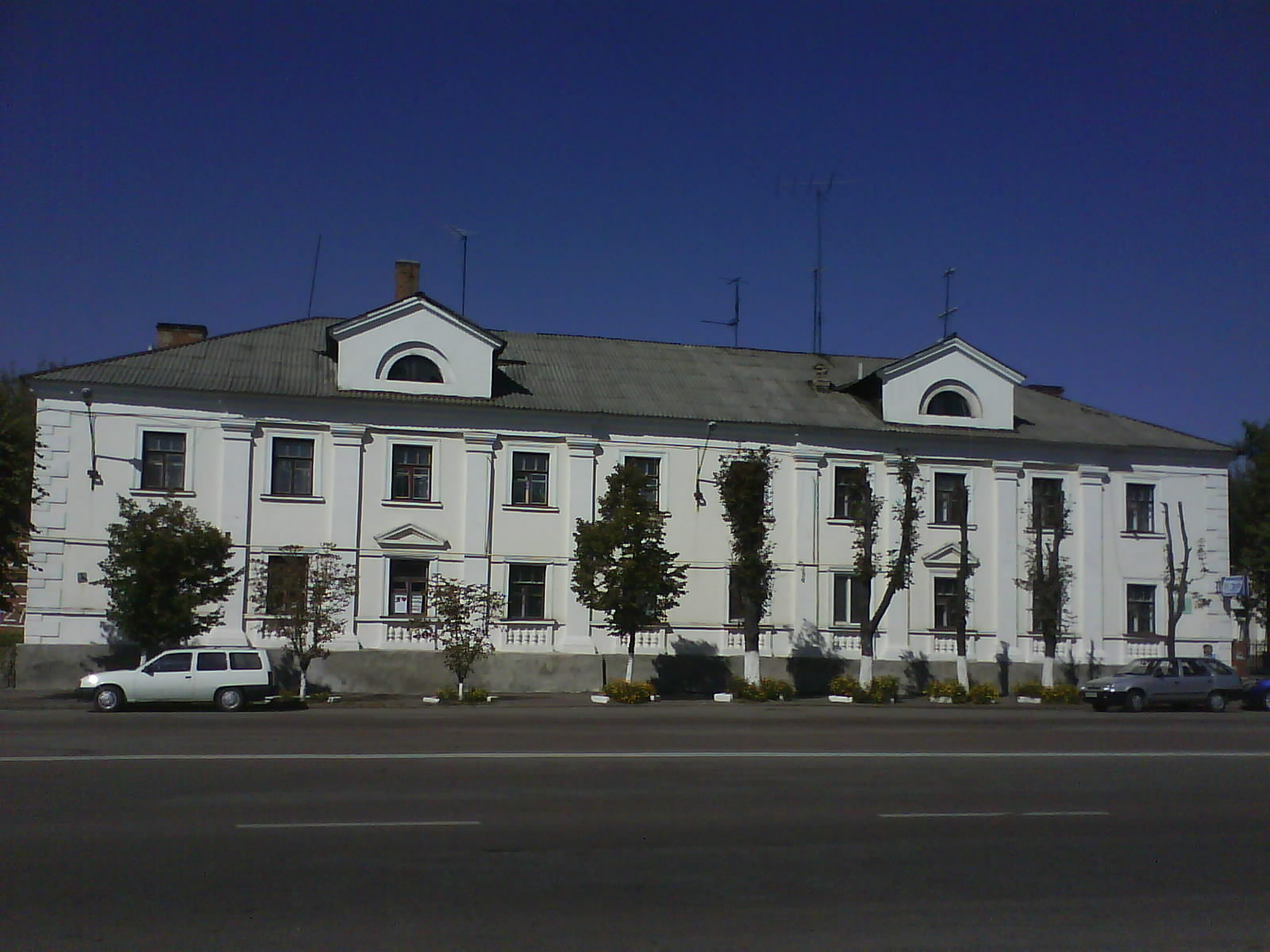
Residential building in Korosten

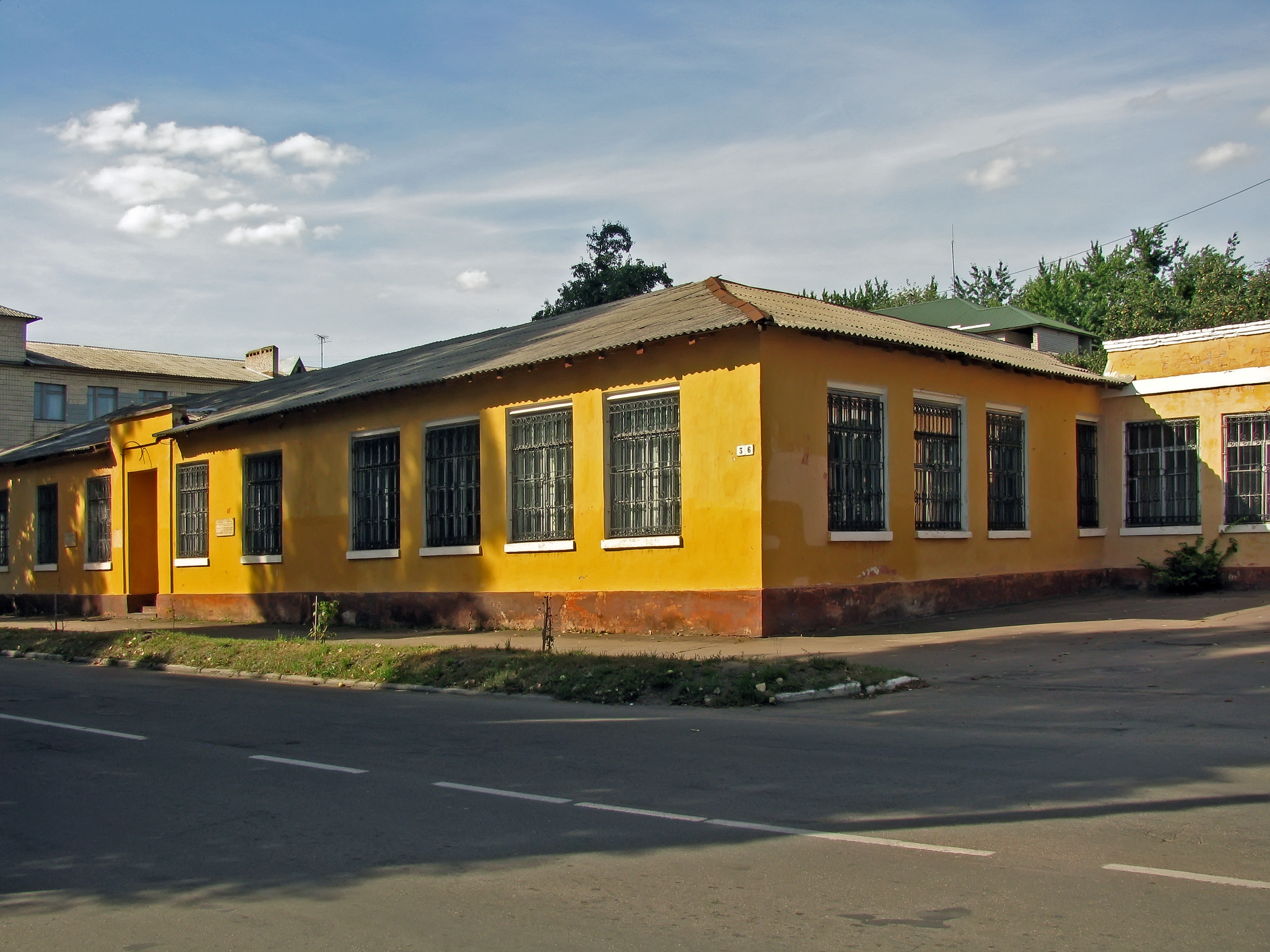
Historical building

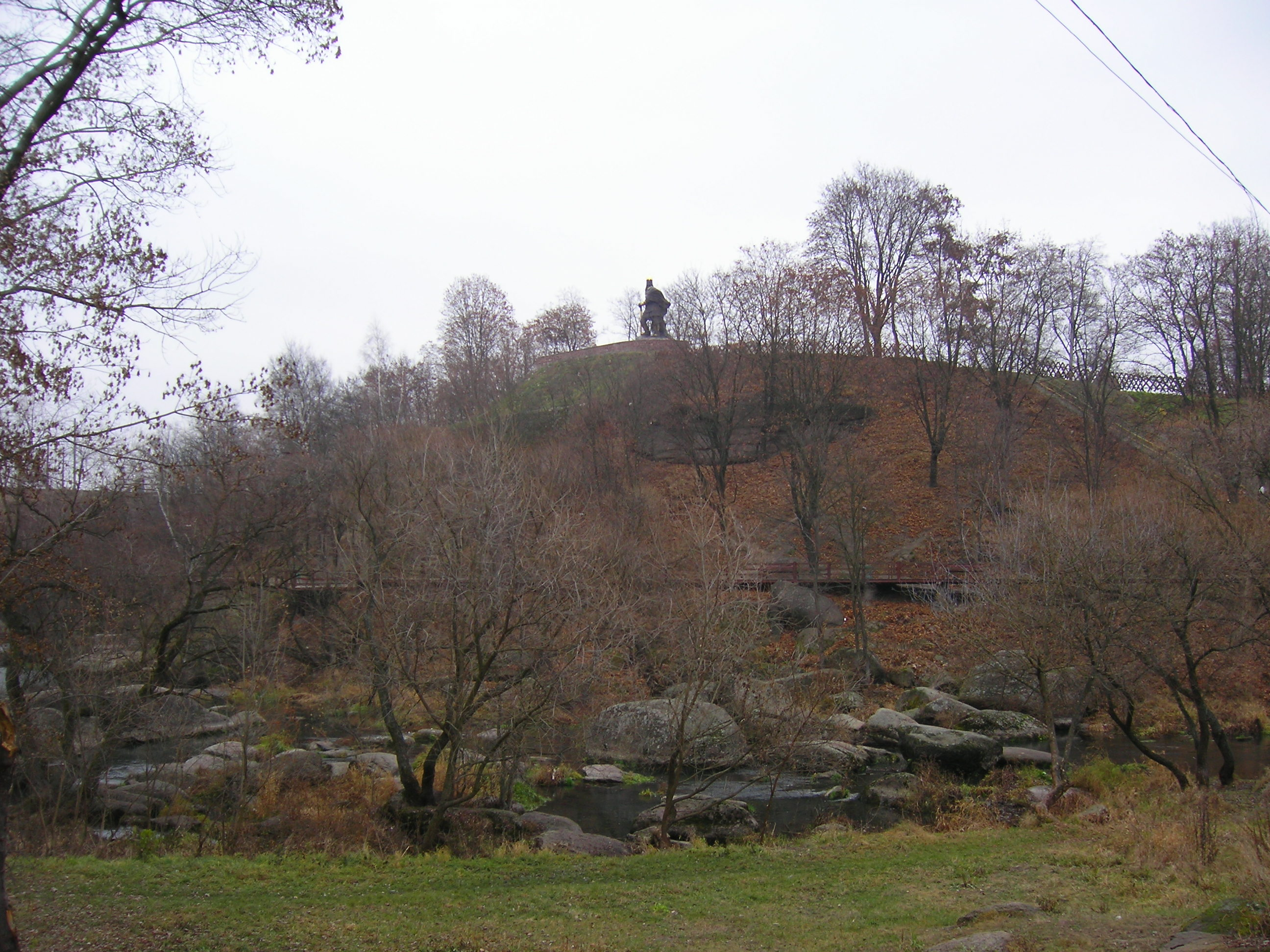
A hill over Uzh River in Korosten

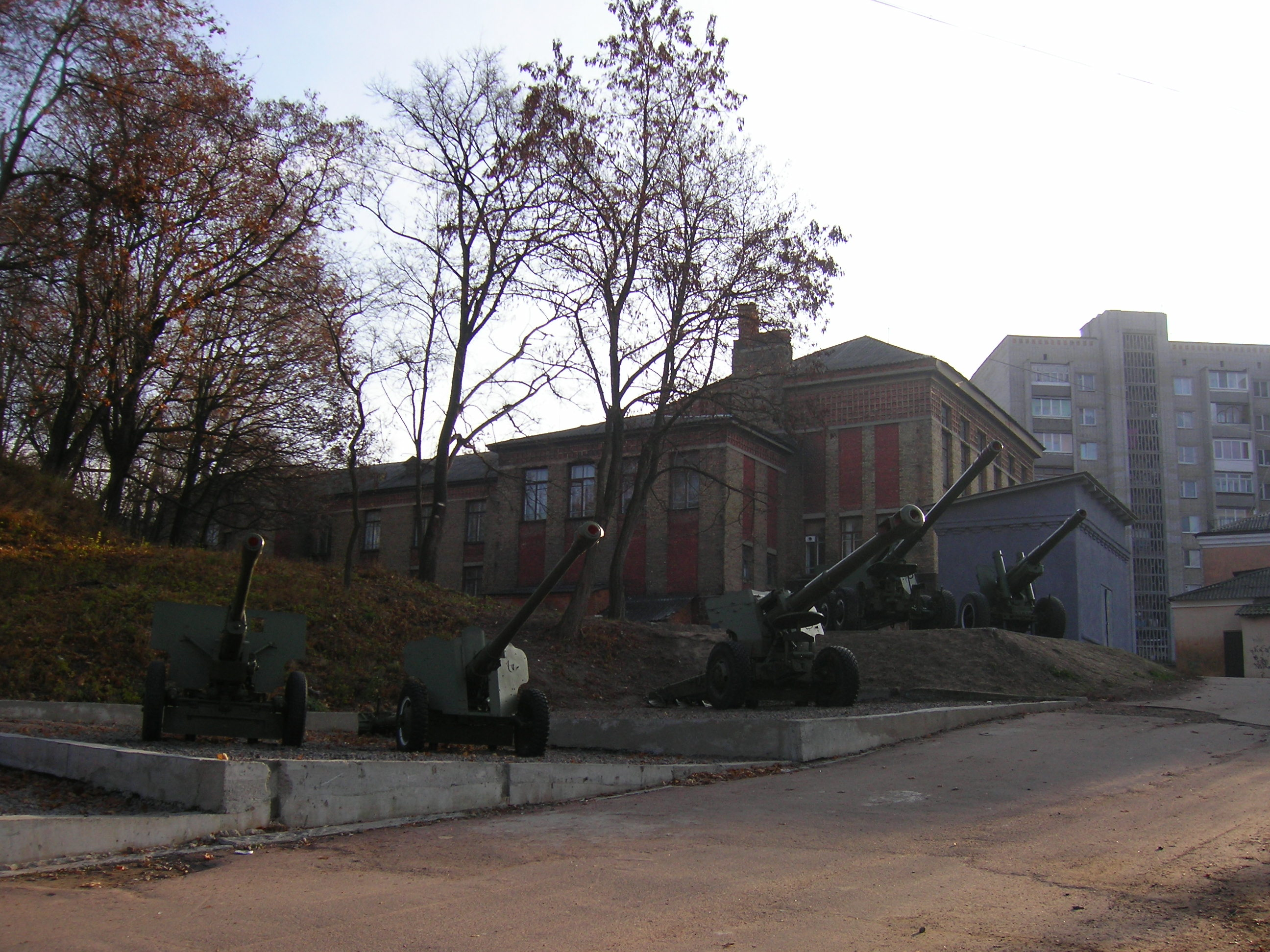
Korosten military museum

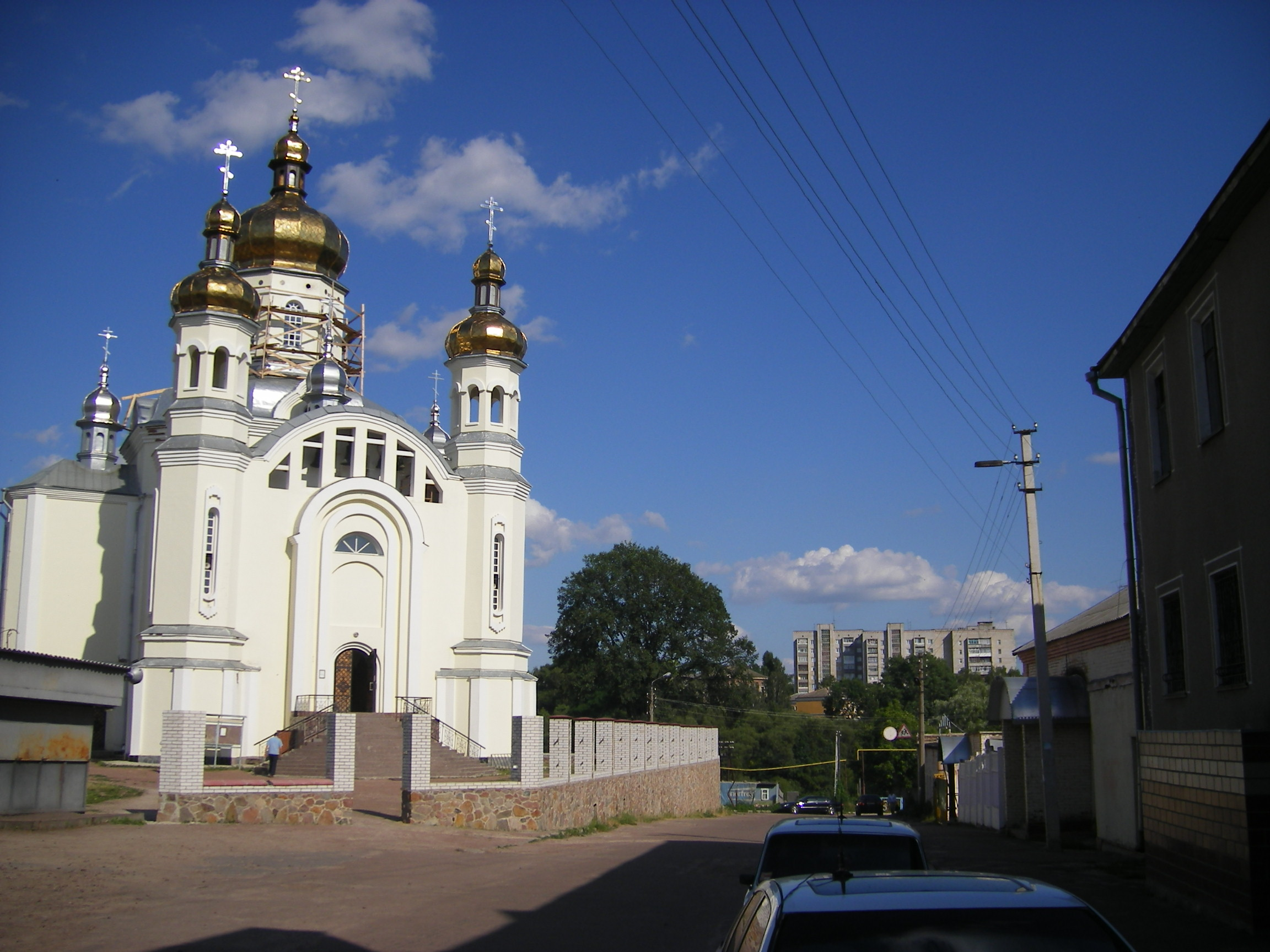
Saint Olga Orthodox church in Korosten
