= Ratiboř (Jindřichův Hradec District) =

- Municipality
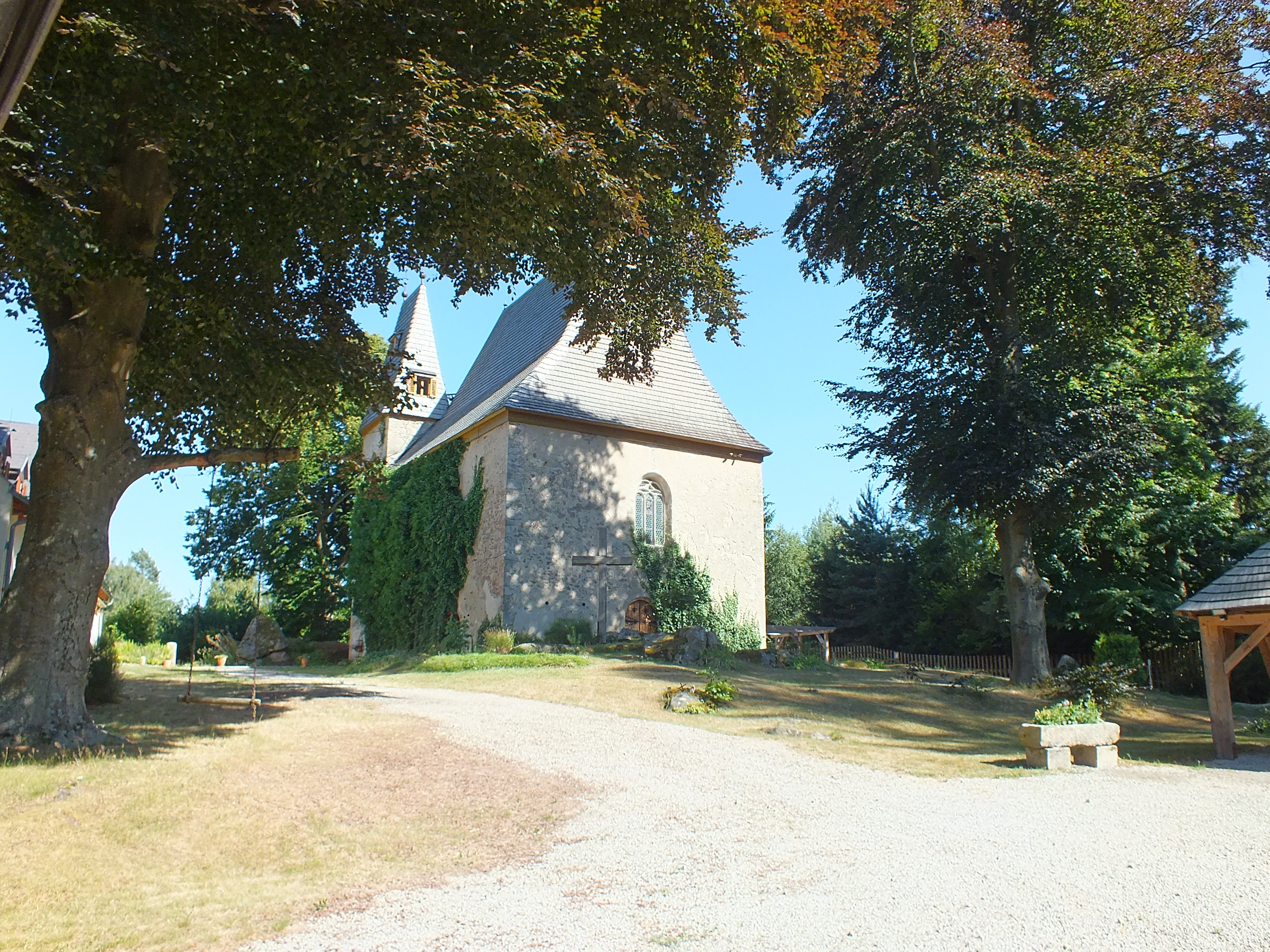
- Church of Saint Barbara

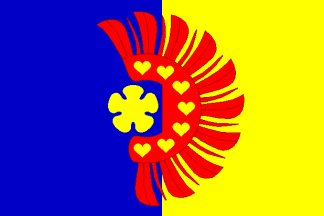
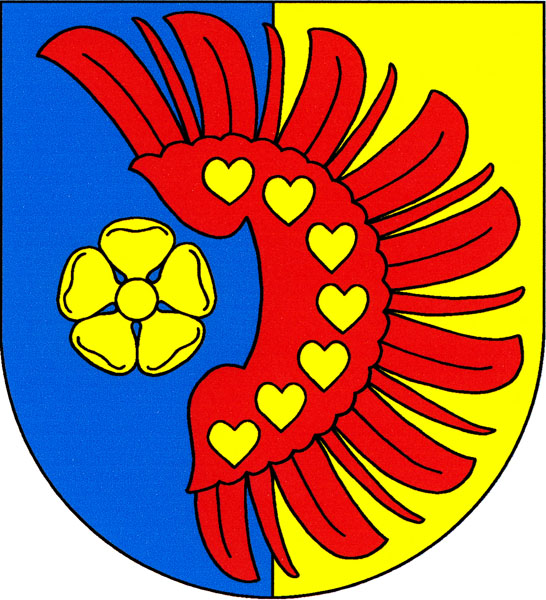
- Flag Coat of arms

- Location in the Czech Republic
- Coordinates: 49°8′37″N 14°54′54″E
- Country: Czech Republic
- Region: South Bohemian
- District: Jindřichův Hradec
- First mentioned: 1265

Area
  - Total: 11.68 km^{2} (4.51 sq mi)
- Elevation: 512 m (1,680 ft)

Population (2026-01-01)
  - Total: 206
  - Density: 17.6/km^{2} (45.7/sq mi)
- Time zone: UTC+1 (CET)
  - Summer (DST): UTC+2 (CEST)
- Postal codes: 377 01, 378 21
- Website: www.obecratibor.cz

Ratiboř is a municipality and village in Jindřichův Hradec District in the South Bohemian Region of the Czech Republic. It has about 200 inhabitants.

Ratiboř lies approximately 8 kilometres (5 mi) west of Jindřichův Hradec, 37 km (23 mi) north-east of České Budějovice, and 111 km (69 mi) south of Prague.

== Demographics ==
Historical population
Year	Pop.	±%
1869	576	—
1880	545	−5.4%
1890	527	−3.3%
1900	535	+1.5%
1910	510	−4.7%
1921	465	−8.8%
1930	439	−5.6%
1950	327	−25.5%
1961	302	−7.6%
1970	232	−23.2%
1980	211	−9.1%
1991	179	−15.2%
2001	171	−4.5%
2011	185	+8.2%
2021	188	+1.6%
Source: Censuses
