= Vystupovychi =

Vysupovychi Виступовичі
- Rural-type settlement
- Location of Vystupovychi Vystupovychi (Ukraine)
- Coordinates: 51°33′49″N 29°04′41″E
- Country: Ukraine
- Oblast: Zhytomyr Oblast
- Raion: Korosten Raion
- Established: 1475
- Elevation: 130 m (430 ft)

Population
  - Total: 80

Vystupovychi (Ukrainian: Виступовичі) is a rural-type settlement in the Korosten Raion, Zhytomyr Oblast in central Ukraine. As of 2001, according to the census conducted, the population was 80 people.

== Geography ==
The settlement is near the border with Belarus's Homiel Oblast. The Rakusha river originates in the village. The elevation is 130 meters above sea level.

== History ==
Vystupovychi was first mentioned in the act of 1545 as the property of Soltan Stetskovych. There were "eight houses, two services, tributes of which 5 cadets of honey, and four copes of money."

During the Russian Empire era, the village was part of the Kovel governorate.

In 1923-97 it was the administrative center of Vystupovychi village council of Ovruch raion.

In 1972 Vystupovychi had 447 yards and 1322 inhabitants. In the village, there was a subsidiary farm of the Ovruch forestry enterprise, a turpentine factory, and a timber warehouse. There was a school with 300 students, a club for 400 seats, and a library. There was a paramedic and obstetric station, nurseries, and a post office.

As a result of the Chernobyl disaster of 1986, the village belongs to the zone of unconditional (mandatory) resettlement. Most of the villagers were resettled, and the school, club, post office, shops, and paramedic station stopped working. On June 28, 1997, the village council was liquidated.

Some residents of Vystupovychi were resettled and accommodated in the Kirovohrad oblast.

In 2020, the territory and settlements of Rudnyansky village council of Ovruch raion, according to the order of the Cabinet of Ministers of Ukraine No. 711-p of June 12, 2020 "On the definition of administrative centers and approval of territories of territorial communities of Zhytomyr oblast", were included in the Ovruch city territorial community of Korosten raion of Zhytomyr oblast. The raion was annexed into the Korosten Raion.

According to the head of the Ovruch territorial community, during the Russian invasion of Ukraine, Russian troops did not attempt to cross the state border of Ukraine at the Vystupovychi border crossing.

== Population ==
According to the 1989 Ukrainian SSR census, the population of the village was 863, of which 385 were men and 478 were women.

According to the 2001 Ukrainian census, the village had a population of 80 people.

== Language ==
Distribution of the population by mother tongue according to the 2001 census:

Language	Percentage
Ukrainian	92,5%
Russian	5%
Belarusian	2,5%
