= Kushchuba =

Kushchuba Кущуба
- Station
- Location within Vologda Oblast Location within Russia
- Coordinates: 59°13′N 38°58′E
- Country: Russia
- Region: Vologda Oblast
- District: Vologodsky District
- Time zone: UTC+3:00

Kushchuba (Russian: Кущуба) is a rural locality (a station) in Staroselskoye Rural Settlement, Vologodsky District, Vologda Oblast, Russia. The population was 27 as of 2002.

== Geography ==
Kushchuba is located 62 km west of Vologda (the district's administrative centre) by road. Borodkino is the nearest rural locality.
