= Boryspil Bus Factory =

Automobile plant in Prilysky, Ukraine

- Native name: Бориспільський автозавод
- Romanized name: Boryspilskyi avtozavod
- Company type: PJSC
- Industry: Automotive
- Predecessor: UkrVolgaTechService
- Founded: 2002 in Boryspil, Ukraine
- Defunct: March 30, 2023
- Headquarters: Prolisky, Boryspil Raion, Kyiv Oblast, Ukraine
- Products: Buses
- Parent: Etalon Corporation
- Website: baz.ua

Boryspil Bus Factory (Ukrainian: Бориспільський автозавод) was a private Ukrainian manufacturer of buses located in the village of Prolisky near Boryspil, owned by parent company Etalon Corporation.

== History ==
The plant has been founded in 2002 in Prolisky settlement in Kyiv Oblast in Ukraine on the basis of the enterprise UkrVolgaTechService, which has been producing GAZ passenger cars and trucks since 1998. The plant was re-profiled for the licensed production of pickups and trucks of the Indian company Tata.

The Boryspil Bus Factory is a part of Etalon Corporation, which is based on the idea of creating and producing a wide range of vehicles for various purposes to meet the needs of both the domestic market and markets of other countries.

Alongside the production of cargo vehicles BAZ began to use Indian chassis for installing a Ukrainian-built passenger bodies on them, this way the company has become a leading supplier of buses in the Ukrainian market. In 2003 the plant has produced over 400 vehicles.

From the beginning BAZ was ordering the design for their vehicles from Lviv's UkrAvtobusProm institute that was already designing buses for LAZ since the 1960s. Their first bus was put in production in 2002; it was BAZ A079, based on the Indian truck Tata LPT.

== Models ==
As of 2021 at the factory produced the following models of buses:

=== Buses ===
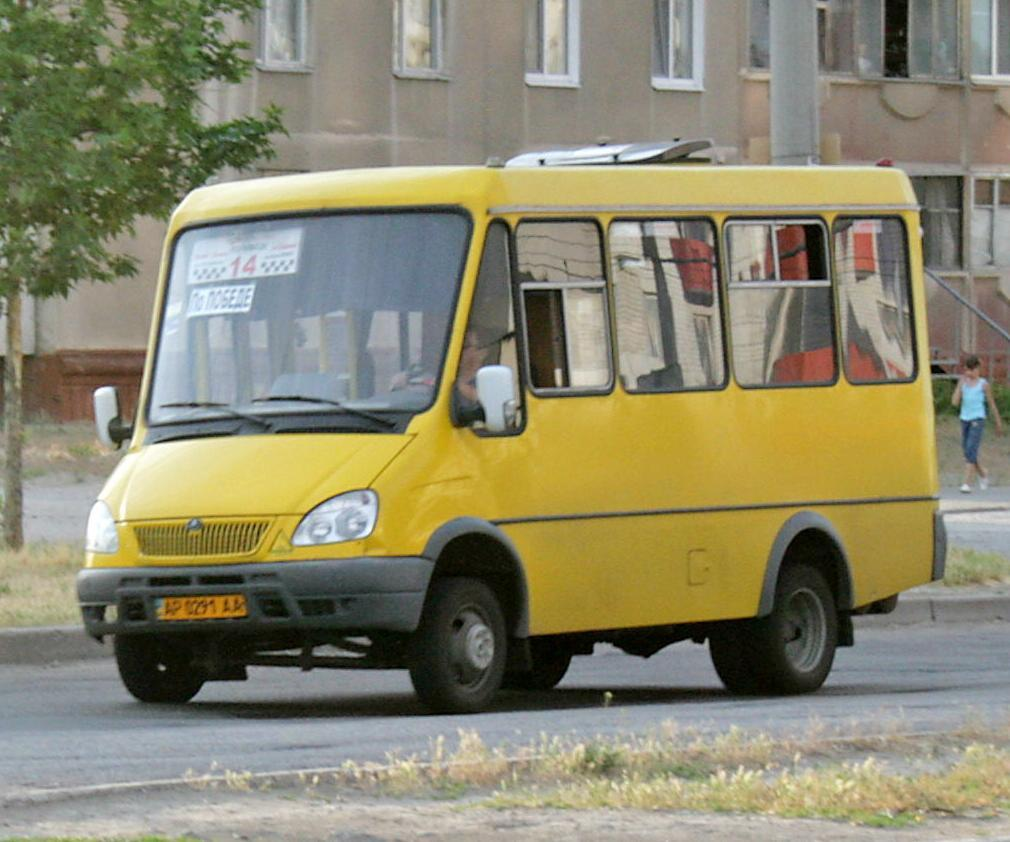
BAZ-2215 "Delfin"

- BAZ-2215 "Dolphin" ⁣— small class minibus produced mainly at Chernihiv Bus Factory
- BAZ-A074 "Chornobryvets" ⁣— ⁣tourist bus produced mainly at Chernihiv Bus Factory (Photo)
- BAZ-A079
- BAZ-A081
- BAZ-A148
- BAZ-A11110

=== Other vehicles ===
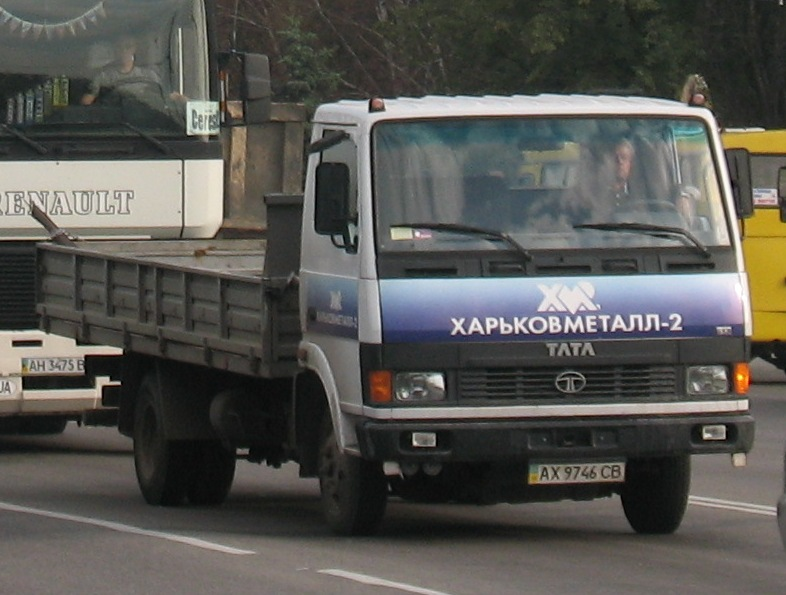
BAZ-T713

- BAZ-T713 — pickup truck, tow truck;
- BAZ-T9016 "Podorozhnyk";
- BAZ-T1116 — people carrier;
- BAZ-T1518 — pickup truck, grain truck, people carrier;
- BAZ-T1618.
