= Chernihiv Bus Factory =

Automobile plant in Chernihiv, Ukraine

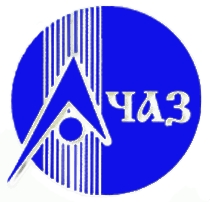
- Native name: Чернігівський автозавод
- Company type: PJSC
- Industry: Automotive
- Predecessor: ChernihivAvtoDetal
- Founded: 2003 in Chernihiv, Ukraine
- Headquarters: Chernihiv, Ukraine
- Products: Buses
- Parent: Etalon Corporation
- Website: http://chaz-avto.com.ua

Chernihiv Bus Factory (Ukrainian: Чернігівський автозавод) is a private (closed) Ukrainian manufacturer of buses located in Chernihiv, owned by parent company Etalon Corporation.

== History ==
The plant was founded in 2003 at the plant of ChernihivAvtoDetal (Chernihiv Factory Driveshafts), which in addition to the principal product from the late 1990s was one of the largest collector of cars from Gorky Automobile Plant in Ukraine, part of the Etalon Corporation. Manufacturing driveshafts also been retained by the reorganized company, dubbed LLC "Ukrainian Gimbal". In 2003, with the first came off the assembly line bus BAZ-2215 "Dolphin". With increasing demands on the buses BAZ-A079, part of the production was moved to Chernihiv from Boryspil Bus Factory, also included in the corporation Etalon Corporation. In 2007, they put on the conveyor the new bus ChAZ-A074 with chassis from FAW. In 2008 at the factory started production of buses ChAZ-A08310. Also, in 2011, the plant produced with Belarusian company "Belkommunmash" trolleybus BKM 321, which as of August 24, 2011 runs on Chernihiv trolleybus route number 4.

== Products ==
As of 2021 the factory produced the following models of buses and trolley buses:

- BAZ-2215 "Dolphin" - small class minibus
- BAZ-3215 "Dolphin Maxi" - larger bus based on BAZ-2215 (released two copies)
- BAZ-A079
- ChAZ-A074
- ChAZ-A08310 - large class tourist bus
- BKM/ChAZ-321 - trolleybus made in part with Belkommunmash
- Etalon T12110 "Barvinok" - trolleybus
- Etalon A12210 "Astra" - city bus based on Etalon T12110
- Etalon A08432 "Tulip" - city bus

== Gallery ==
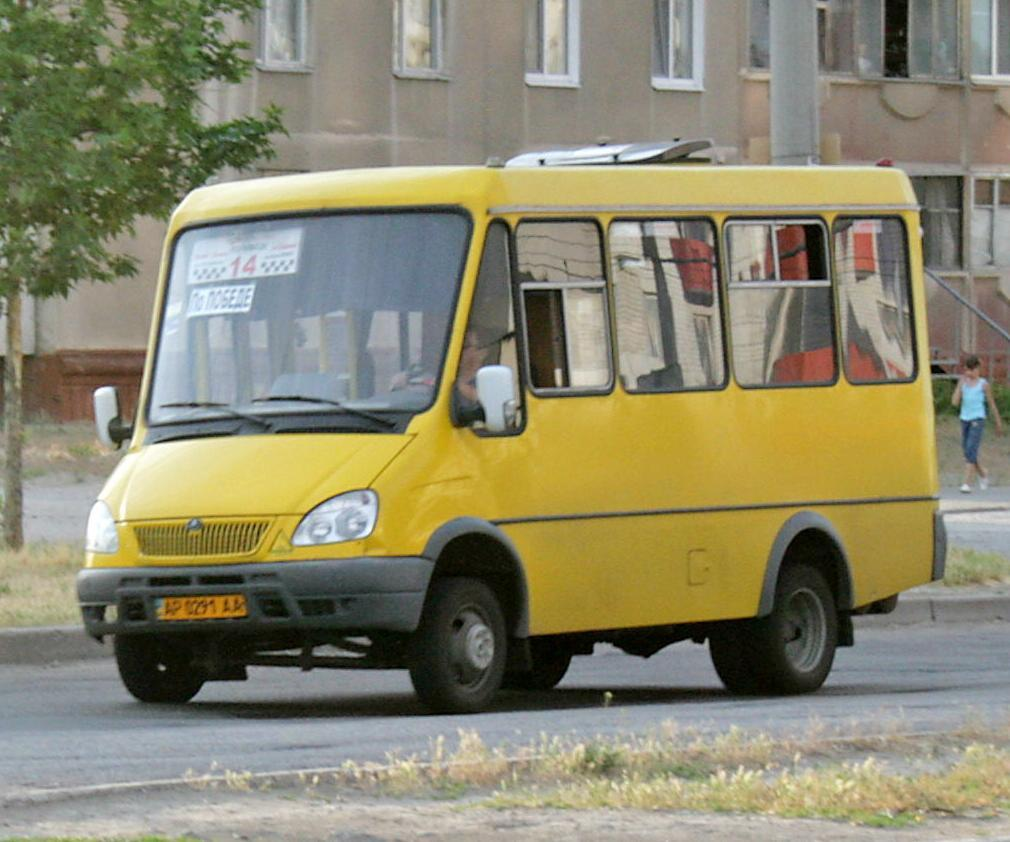
Minibus BAZ-2215 "Dolphin"

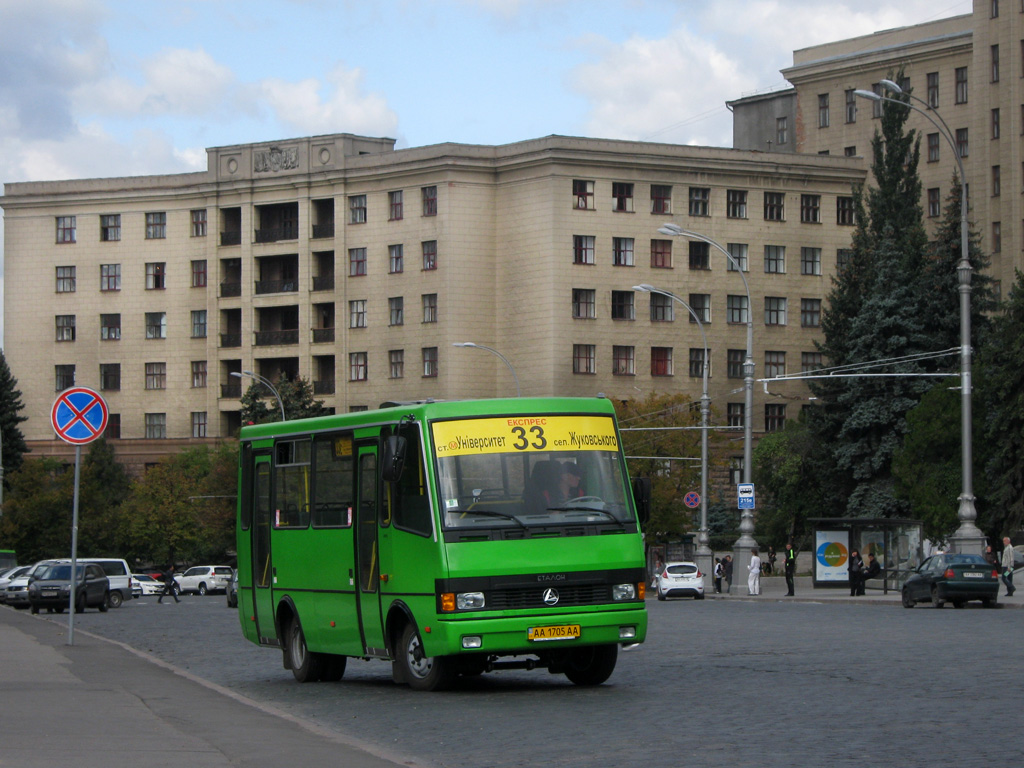
Bus BAZ-A079

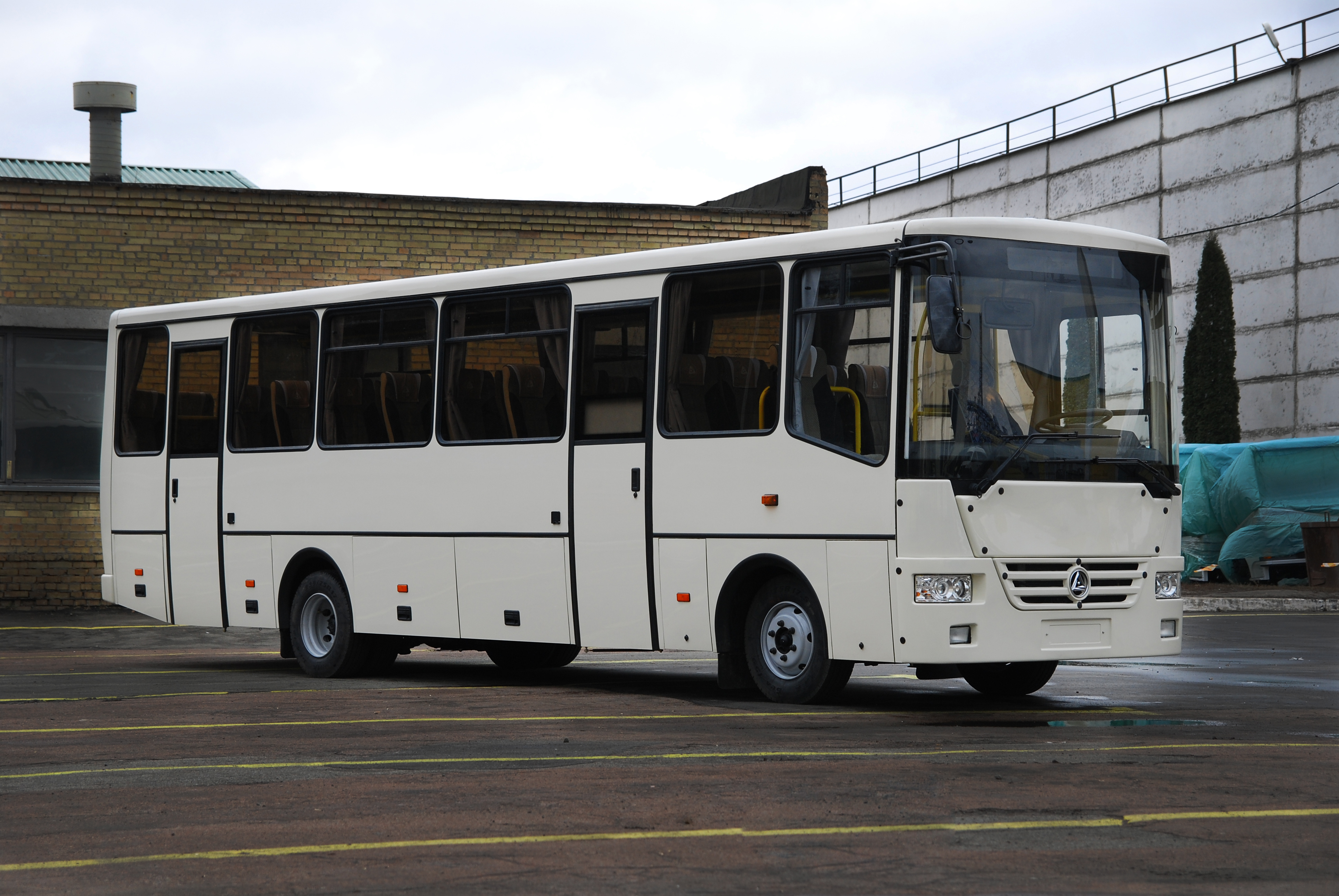
Bus BAZ-A081 "Troyanda" produced in Boryspil Bus Factory

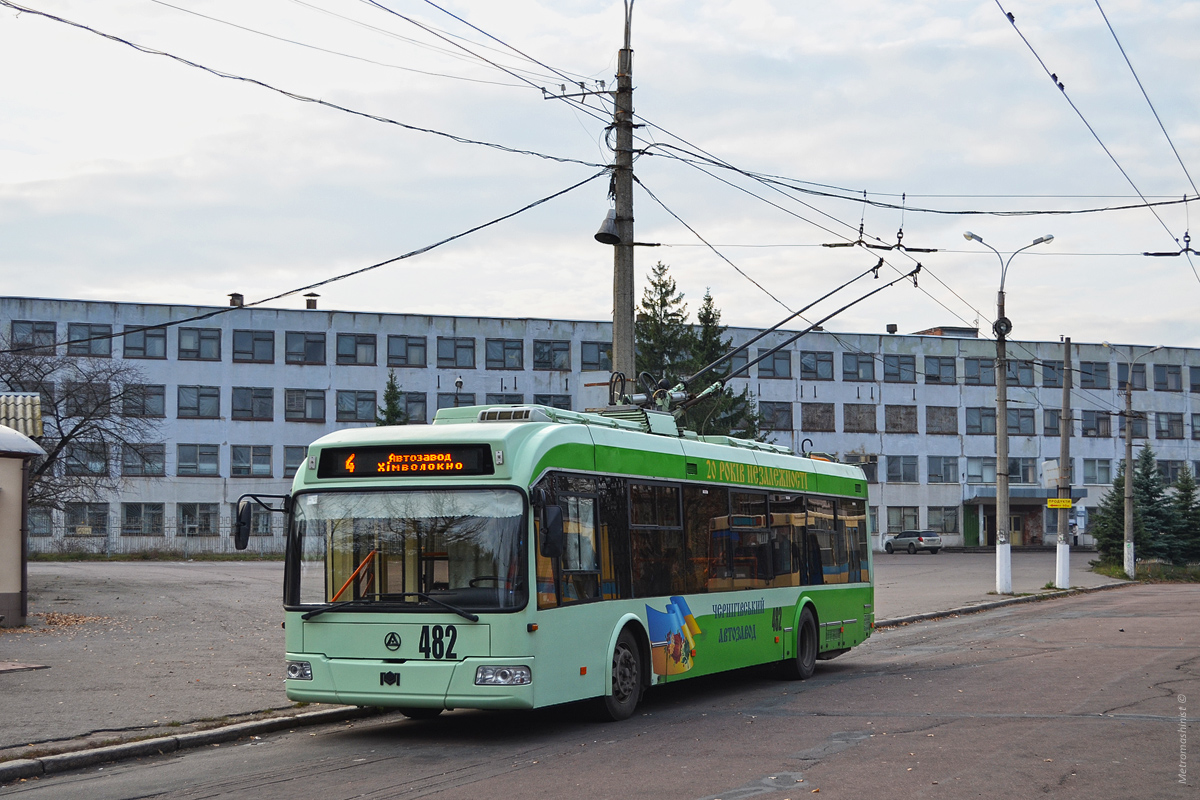
Trolleybus BKM/ChAZ-321
