= BAZ-2215 =

Ukrainian bus model

BAZ-2215 Delfin/Kruchenyi Panych
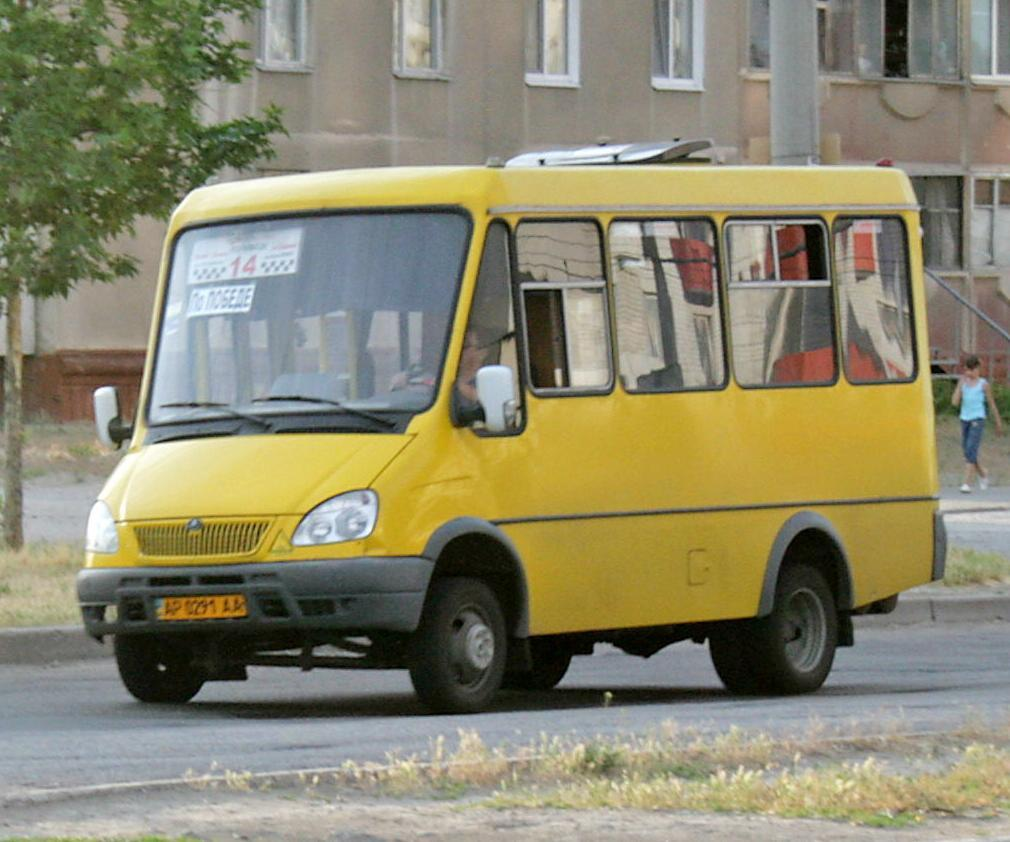
- BAZ-2215 in Zaporizhzhia

Overview
- Manufacturer: Etalon
- Also called: BAZ-2215 Vyunok
- Production: 2003-2010
- Assembly: Prolisky, Ukraine (BAZ); Chernihiv, Ukraine (ChAZ)
- Designer: UkrAutobusProm

Body and chassis
- Class: minibus
- Doors: 2
- Floor type: high-floor
- Chassis: GAZ-3302
- Related: Tur A049

Powertrain
- Engine: ZMZ-406; ZMZ-405.22; UMZ-4216
- Transmission: mechanical

Dimensions
- Wheelbase: 3,150 mm (124.0 in)
- Length: 5,680 mm (223.6 in)
- Width: 2,070 mm (81.5 in)
- Height: 2,630 mm (103.5 in)
- Curb weight: 3,980 kg (8,774 lb)

BAZ-2215 Delfin (Dolphin), known as Kruchenyi Panych (Ipomea) in 2008–2010, is a Ukrainian small class minibus manufactured by Etalon, it is designed to transport passengers on city commercial routes. BAZ-2215 buses were assembled at two plants at once — BAZ in Prolisky and ChAZ in Chernihiv. BAZ-2215 is based on the widespread GAZ-3302 GAZelle truck from Russia, and the body design is the development of Ukraine's UkrAutobusProm.

== Description ==
BAZ-2215 buses are much higher than the GAZelle and allow passengers to stand in the cabin at full height, due to this, handrails are present inside. The salon is equipped with fourteen chairs and is fenced off from the driver's cabin with a partition. Passenger doors located in front of the body are automatic, there are also emergency manual doors in the back of the cabin, wide windows provide a good view. Ventilation of the cabin is carried out with the help of one hatch in the roof and a vent on the side windows.

== History ==
The first BAZ-2215 units were assembled in 2003 at the Boryspil Bus Factory in Prolisky, but its production facilities were not enough to produce a new model alongside BAZ-A079 bus that entered the production a year earlier. Therefore, in August 2003, the former ChernihivAvtoDetal plant has been bought by Etalon to create the Chernihiv Bus Factory, where in September of the same year the production of BAZ-2215 minibuses began. For some time, A079 and 2215 were assembled at two factories at the same time but later BAZ had stopped their assembly of the latter and only Chernihiv kept producing the Delfin.

In 2003–2004, in addition to the standard modification, the Boryspil Bus Factory also produced buses on the chassis of the pre-facelift GAZelle. They received the BAZ-22151 index.

At SIA-2004 Etalon revealed the Delfin Maxi, a three-axel bus based on GAZ-2215, another axel was needed to include the second automatic door that could overload the rear end otherwise. The model got the 3215 index and two units were assembled in 2006-2007 with Maxi never ending up in a serial production.

Since 2006 BAZ-22154 began to be produced replacing the standard 2215 modification. It has a ZMZ-405.22 engine, which meets the adopted standards of environmental safety in Ukraine, Euro-2. In addition, the updated Delfins are equipped with the ABS system of the German company Wabco.

March 2, 2007 ChAZ opened a new body shop, the same day they've assembled their 2000th bus which was a BAZ-2215 Delfin.

September 26, 2008 Etalon held a new marketing strategy announcement event in Chernihiv, renaming all of their models after the flowers of Ukraine, Delfin was renamed to Kruchenyi Panych (Ipomea), on Russian market it was expected to be translated as Vyunok. The same day ChAZ assembled their 4000th bus which was the newly renamed 2215, the rolling down the line ceremony has been held by the Mayor of Chernihiv Oleksandr Sokolov.

Ukrainian bus market was heavily affected by the 2008 financial crisis with sales plummeting instantly in September. In December both BAZ and ChAZ seized their assembly planning to renew it in February 2009 but the absence of demand pushed it back to April.

In 2010, the BAZ-22155 was presented, equipped with engine UMZ-4216 (Euro-3). The model has been in production for a short time before the assembly of 2215 has been stopped in 2010.

== Technical specifications ==
Axel	2
Wheel	disk, 4 (2×2)
Tire	175 R16C,185 R16C
Curb weight, kg	2520
Full mass of vehicle, kg	3980
Doors	glass, single-form rotary sliding type
Door configuration	1—1
Sitting capacity	14
Transmission	5-speed manual
Engine	petrol 4-stroke ZMZ-40522
Engine displacement, liters	2.46
Maximum speed, km/h	70

== Modifications ==
- BAZ-2215 Delfin – base model
- BAZ-22151 Delfin – pre-facelift variation
- BAZ-22154 Delfin/Kruchenyi Panych – Euro-2 standard variation
- BAZ-22155 Kruchenyi Panych – Euro-2 standard variation
- BAZ-3215 Delfin Maxi - three-axel variation

== Gallery ==
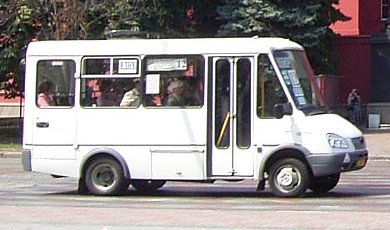
BAZ-2215 Delfin in Kyiv

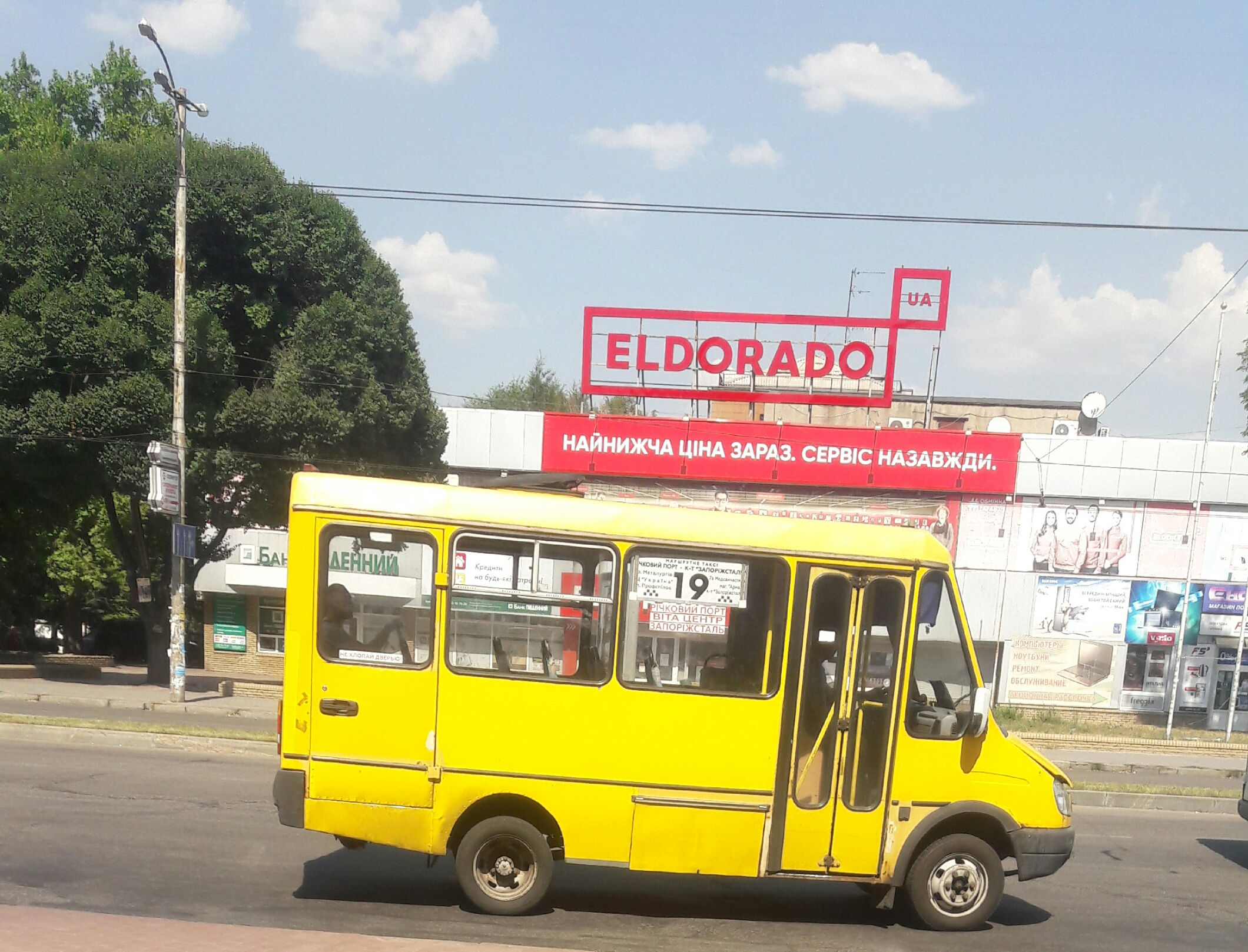
BAZ-2215 Delfin in Zaporizhzhia

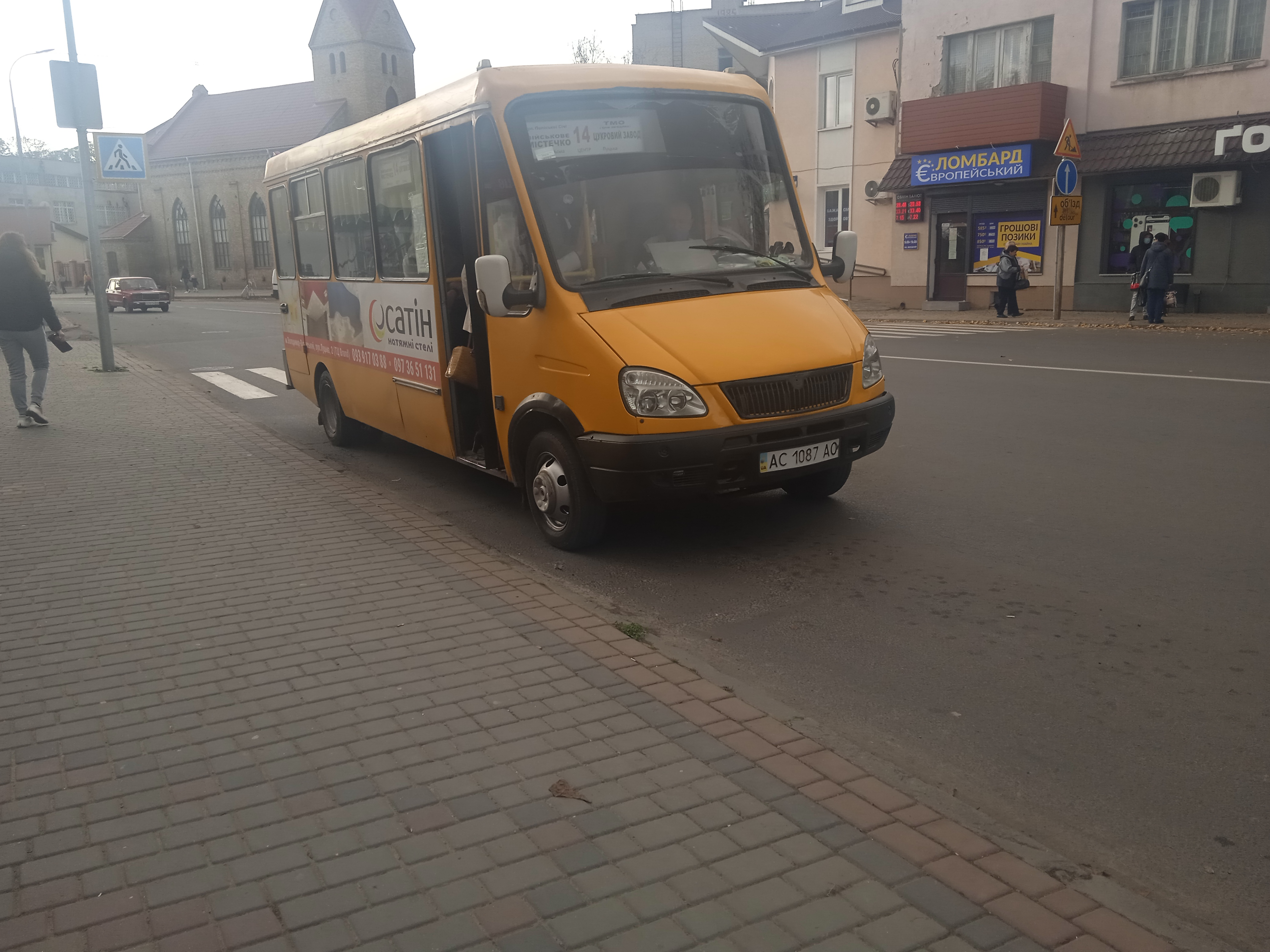
BAZ-22154 Delfin in Volodymyr
