= Etalon A12210 =

Ukrainian trolleybus model

Etalon A12210 "Astra"
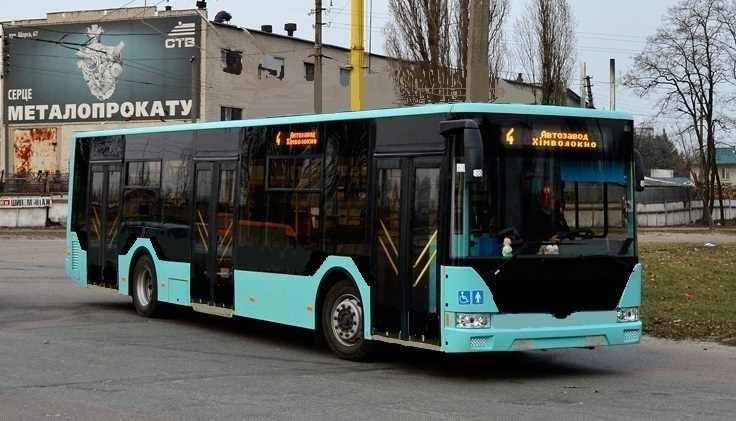

Overview
- Manufacturer: Chernihiv Bus Factory (ChAZ)
- Production: 2019–present
- Assembly: Chernihiv, Ukraine

Body and chassis
- Doors: 3
- Floor type: Low-floor
- Chassis: 2

Powertrain
- Engine: diesel Ashok Leyland
- Capacity: 98 to 102 passengers (30 seated)

Dimensions
- Length: 12000 mm
- Width: 2550 mm
- Height: 3600 mm

Etalon A12210 "Astra" is a twelve-meter low-entry bus that was launched at the Chernihiv Bus Factory (CHAZ) at the end of 2018. Mass production of the model began in 2019. The bus is based on the Etalon T12110 trolleybus.

== Description ==
The capacity of the bus is 98 to 102 passengers, including 30 seats. The bus is equipped with a load-bearing body of the wagon layout. The bus is equipped with a 230-horsepower (700 Nm) Ashok Leyland Euro-5 engine. The suspension of the front wheels is independent pneumatic, the rear wheels are dependent, pneumatic, bridges — ZF. The electronic control system has a pneumatic suspension — it can change the ground clearance, climb and go around obstacles. And at a speed of 5 km/h it automatically lowers, it can also bend at stops towards the sidewalk — the so-called kneeling system. The bus has a disabled boarding platform.
