= Belkommunmash BKM-321 =

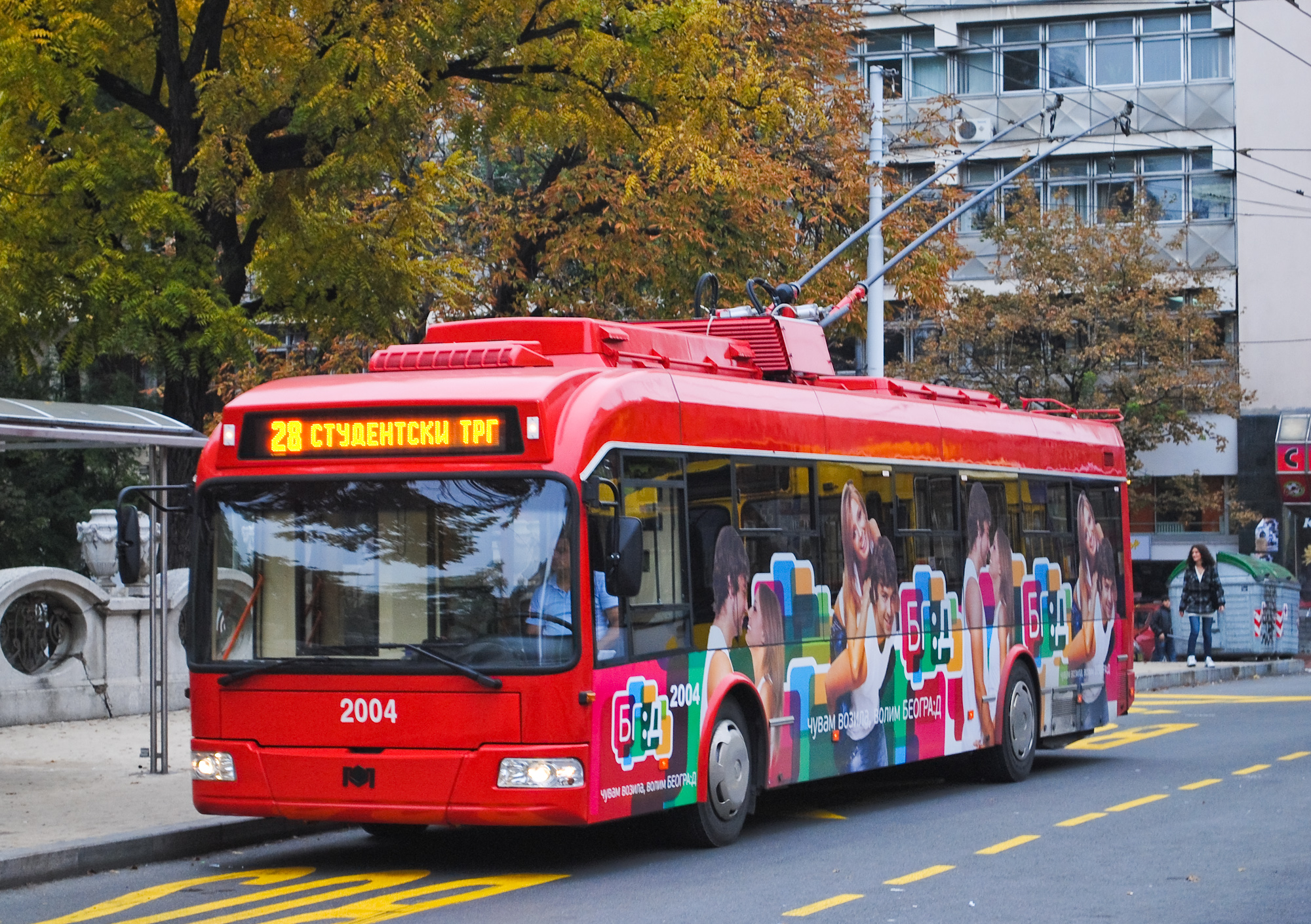

Overview
- Manufacturer: Belkommunmash
- Production: 2003–present
- Assembly: Minsk, Belarus; Lutsk, Ukraine

Body and chassis
- Doors: 3
- Floor type: Low-floor

Powertrain
- Engine: DC-BM; Škoda; ANT-155; DTA-U; ACCD-250
- Capacity: 101 to 115 passengers (26 seated)
- Power output: 170 kW (DC-BM); 185 kW (Škoda); 185 kW (ANT-155); 180 kW (DTA-U); 150 kW (ACCD-250)

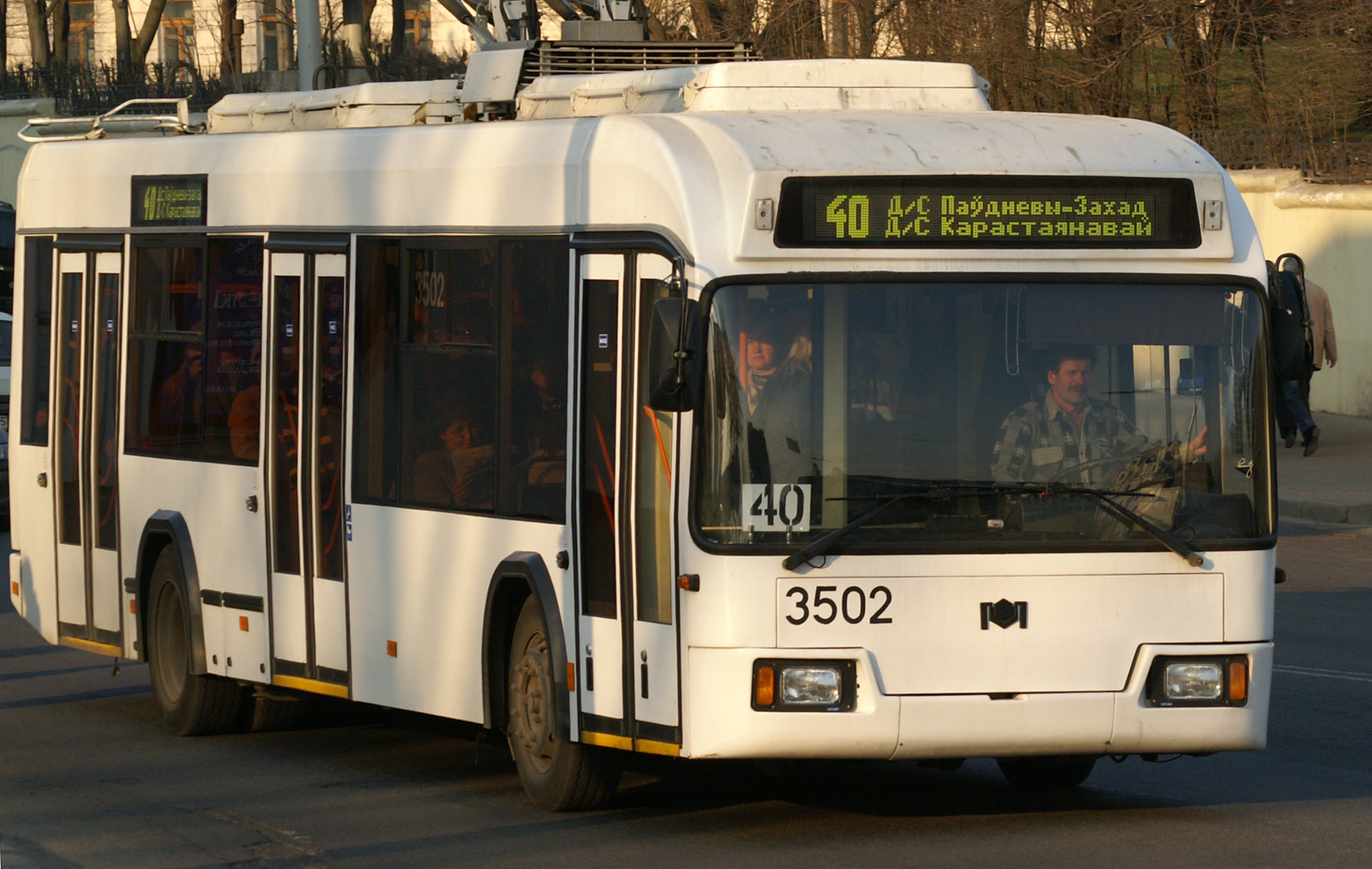
BKM-32102

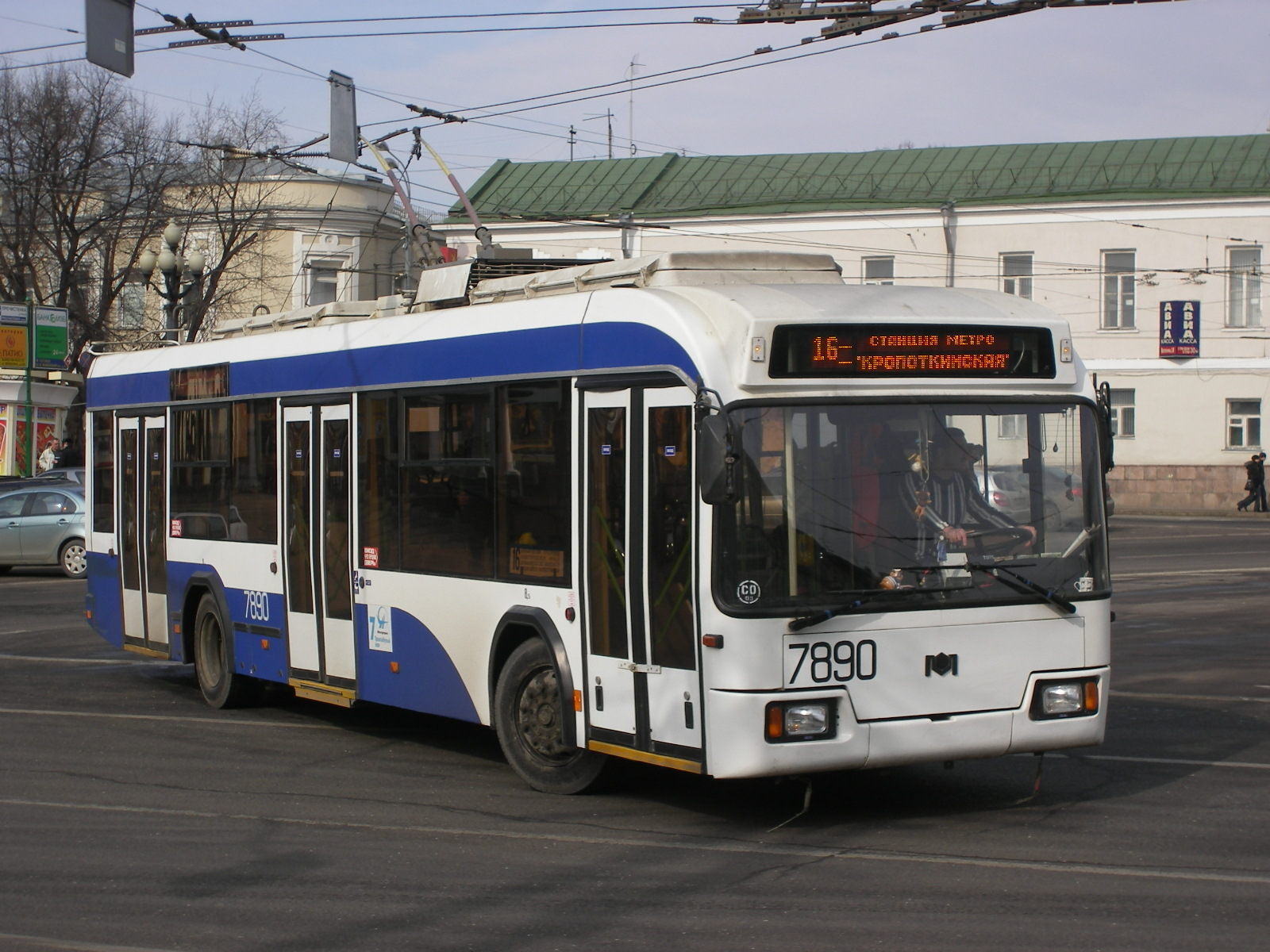
BKM-321

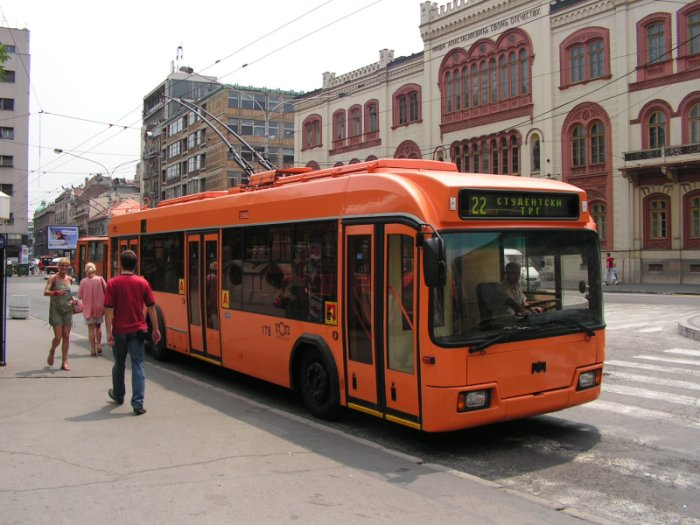
BKM-32104C

The Belkommunmash BKM-321 is a Belarusian large capacity low-floor trolleybus for intracity passenger transportation, mass-produced since 2003. It belongs to the third generation of trolleybuses developed by the Belkommunmash plant in Minsk.

This model of trolleybus is used in many cities of Russia, Belarus, Ukraine, Kyrgyzstan, Latvia, Moldova, Transnistria and Serbia. Of the vehicles operated in Minsk, 33% are model 321, while in Moscow it is 11%. The BKM-321 was also licence-built in Ukraine by Chernihiv as the ChAZ AKSM-321.

== Description ==
=== Body ===
Trolleybus model 321 is a two axle low-floor large capacity city bus. The vehicle has a load-bearing structure. Covering the roof and sides are high-strength galvanized steel sheets. The tube frame, the skin of the body, the underside of the vehicle, the surface of the frame, axles, and some other elements are processed with anti-corrosive enamel by French company RM. The body is also covered with a phosphate-based paint, which protects it from corrosion. The body has a life of not less than 10 years.

The front of the bus is made of fiberglass panels. The bumpers (front and rear) are made of steel and lined with a fiberglass shell. The bumper consists of three parts. In 2008, model 321 underwent restyling and the headlights were replaced with lighting equipment uniform with new models of MAZ trucks, made in the city of Minsk.

The windshield of the BKM-321 is a panoramic type. The wipers are horizontal (installed under each other). Most BKM-321 trolleybuses are equipped with three electronic indicator boards, one front, one rear and one on the right side. Manufacturers include "Integral", "MEMZ", "AGIT", "Selena" and "TEES". The side mirrors are of a spherical type, equipped with anti-reflection coating and electric heating.

=== Electrical equipment ===
The motor compartment of the bus is placed in its rear overhang on the left side. The BKM-321 can be equipped with different motors: DC-BM Russian manufacture, DC (power 170 kW), asynchronous Czech Škoda (with a capacity of 185 kW), asynchronous Belarusian production ANT-155 (with a capacity of 185 kW) and asynchronous motors of the Russian production DTA-U (capacity of 180 kW) and ACCD-250 (150 kW). The buses are equipped with axles from European manufacturers such as Rába or ZF.

The buses are equipped with a pneumatic system for remote removal of the poles from the wires of the contact network. In addition, there is a manual system using ropes and drums.

For powering low voltage circuits, there is a static converter that converts an input voltage of 550 volts to 28 volts. The low-voltage power circuits use two 12-volt batteries. It is also possible to install traction batteries for stand-alone travel.

=== Suspension and brakes ===
The BKM-321 is equipped with air suspension, front and rear. In addition to providing softness, this enables the floor to be lowered at bus stops to facilitate the entry of persons with disabilities and passengers with prams.

Brakes on the front wheels are disk (when using ZF axles) or drum (when using Rába axles). In addition, the bus is equipped with an anti-lock braking system (ABS).

=== Interior ===
There are three doors of the swivel-sliding type, similar to those in the MAZ-103 bus. The 2011 version has doors similar to those in the MAZ-203 bus. In most trolleybuses (except those designed for the cities of Moscow, Chisinau and Balti) the front half of the front door is allocated to the entry and exit of the driver from the cabin. The bus has a low level floor at all the entrances, and the floor height is 36 cm above ground level. Also there is a folding ramp at the entrance to the middle door.

The interior floor is of bakelized plywood with a thickness of 12 millimeters (0.5 inch), which is attached to the base body. The ceiling is made of plastic in gray and white colors. The handrails are made of thin steel pipe, painted with polymer paint, which improves their resistance to corrosion, mechanical wear and sunlight. The bottom rails are attached to the floor and the top rails to the ceiling. Vertical rails can be equipped with buttons to signal the driver to stop the bus on demand. Horizontal rails can be equipped with leather handles for added convenience. In 2011, the design of handrails and glass partitions was changed to match the bus MAZ-203.

The saloon has 26 seats and the full capacity of the bus is 115 (or 101, in accordance with the requirements of the UNECE). Ventilation is by a large sliding window. There are no roof hatches because of the layout of electrical equipment on the roof. It is possible to install air conditioning for the driver and for the passenger compartment. The heating system in the passenger compartment is represented by three coils, two of four kilowatts and one of six kilowatts. The driver's cab has an electric heater with a capacity of six kilowatts.

=== Controls ===
The dashboard of the bus is made in the form of semicircles, which provide the driver with quick access to all necessary controls. In the middle of the instrument panel is a block of exemplary devices. In the middle panel is a large round speedometer (German, VDO) with electronic odometer. Left and right of the speedometer are the gauges and indicator voltage on-board network. In some trolleybuses these devices are replaced by an electronic display.

From 2011, a new panel, similar in form to the trolleybus model 420, is used. To the right and left of the exemplary devices are keys for opening and closing the doors, turning on the alarm, and controlling the direction of movement of the bus. To the left of the driver is an additional side panel, on which is placed the hand brake lever, similar to a joystick control system. Other controls on the left side of the instrument panel house the control keys for heating and ventilation, and for internal and external lighting.

== See also ==
- Trolleybuses in Belarus
