= Etalon T121 =

Ukrainian trolleybus model

Etalon T121 Barvinok
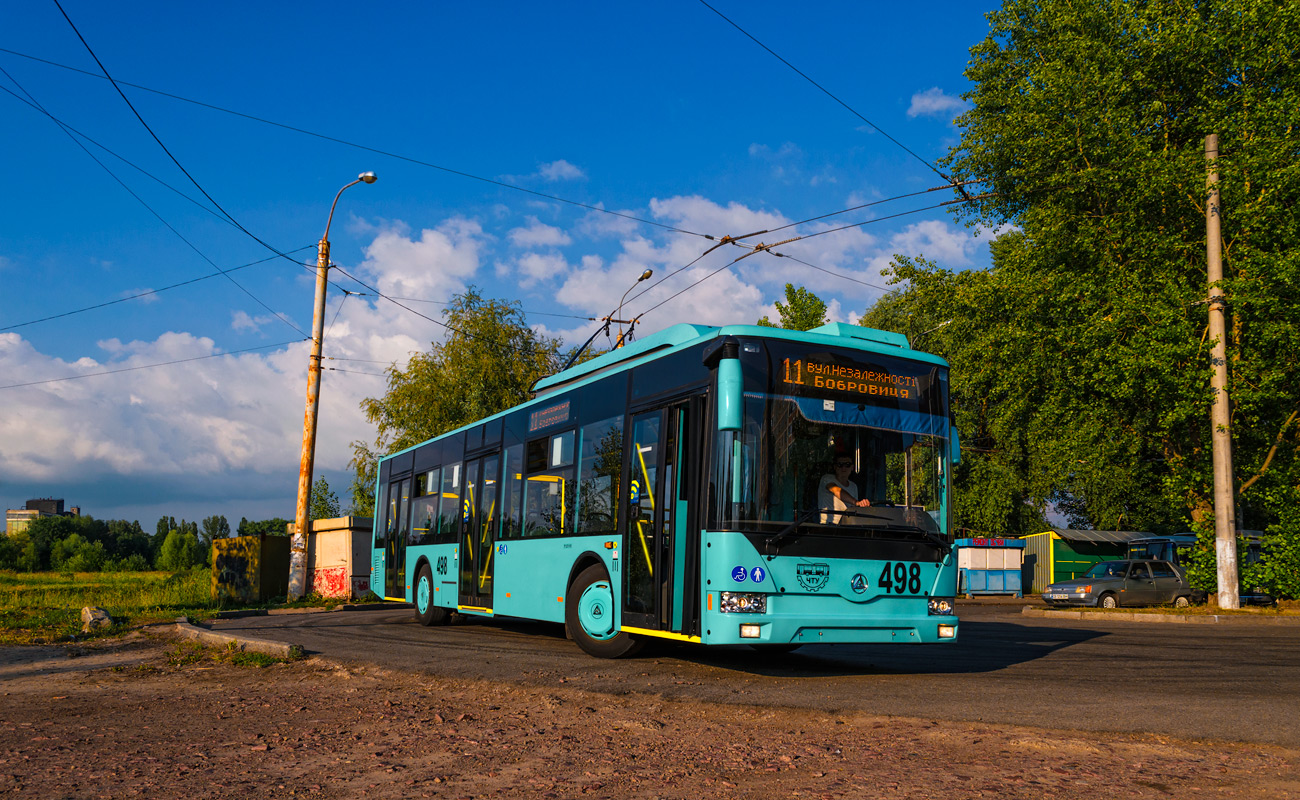
- Etalon T12110 near Chernihiv, Ukraine

Overview
- Manufacturer: Etalon
- Production: 2013–present
- Assembly: Chernihiv, Ukraine (ChAZ)

Body and chassis
- Class: trolleybus
- Doors: 3
- Floor type: Low-floor
- Chassis: 2
- Related: BAZ A111

Powertrain
- Engine: DTA-1U1
- Power output: 180 kW (DTA-1U1)

Dimensions
- Length: 12000 mm
- Width: 2550 mm
- Height: 3600 mm
- Curb weight: 10.86 tonnes

Etalon T121/T122 Barvinok (periwinkle) is a Ukrainian low-entry trolleybus of large capacity, produced at the Chernihiv Bus Factory since 2013. This model was based on the BKM-321 trolleybus using the body of the BAZ A111 bus. There are currently 43 trolleybuses in operation.

== Description ==
The capacity of the trolleybus is 105 people, including 31 seats. The trolleybus is equipped with a load-bearing body of the wagon layout. The trolleybus is equipped with asynchronous engine DTA-1U1 and control system EPROTET-180-2. The suspension of the front wheels is independent pneumatic, the rear wheels are dependent, pneumatic. The trolleybus has a platform for the boarding of disabled people.

In May 2016, Etalon T12110 received an autonomous running system that allows the trolleybus to travel up to 1 km on its own.

The last batch of trolleybuses is equipped with electric motors AD903 U1 manufactured by Kharkiv plant "Elektrotyazhmash".

== History ==
On October 1, 2014, two Etalon T12110 "Barvinok" trolleybuses entered the trolleybus route No. 4 "Avtorzavod – Himvolokno" in Chernihiv.

On December 24, 2016, Chernihiv received a batch of 10 new Etalon T12110 "Barvinok" trolleybuses. The contract amounted to ₴38.94 million. Trolleybuses could be used by people with physical disabilities. The cabin was equipped with 2 conventional and 2 USB sockets and Wi-Fi.

In October 2017, KP "Chernihiv Trolleybus Administration" received five new "Barvinok"s. The total number of trolleybuses of this model in Chernihiv at the end of 2017 is 17 units.

On March 7, 2018, Slovyansk signed a contract for the supply of one trolleybus. Under the contract, the trolleybus was due to come to the company by August 1, 2018. This was the first delivery of trolleybuses of this model outside Chernihiv. On April 21, 2018, the first Etalon T12110 "Barvinok" was sent to the Slovyansk Trolleybus Administration. On May 23, 2018, a second trolleybus arrived.

On March 26, 2018, Etalon-Leasing, a dealer of the Chernihiv Bus Factory, won the tender for the supply of four new trolleybuses for the city of Sumy, resulting in 4 Etalon T12110 "Barvinok"s.

In 2018–2020, Chernihiv received another 12 units of Etalon T12110 "Barvinok".

== Currently operating in ==
Country	City	Company operating	Model	Deployment years	Amount (units)	Unit numbers
Ukraine	Chernihiv	KP Chernihiv Trolleybus Administration	Etalon T12110 "Barvinok"	2014—2019	37	485—522
Ukraine	Slovyansk	KP Slovyansk Trolleybus Administration	Etalon T12110 "Barvinok"	2018	2	301—302
Ukraine	Sumy	KP SMR Sumyelektroavtotrans	Etalon T12110 "Barvinok"	2018	4	160—163
Total					43

== See also ==
- Bogdan T701
- LAZ E183
- Electron T19101
