= Tata LPT 613 =

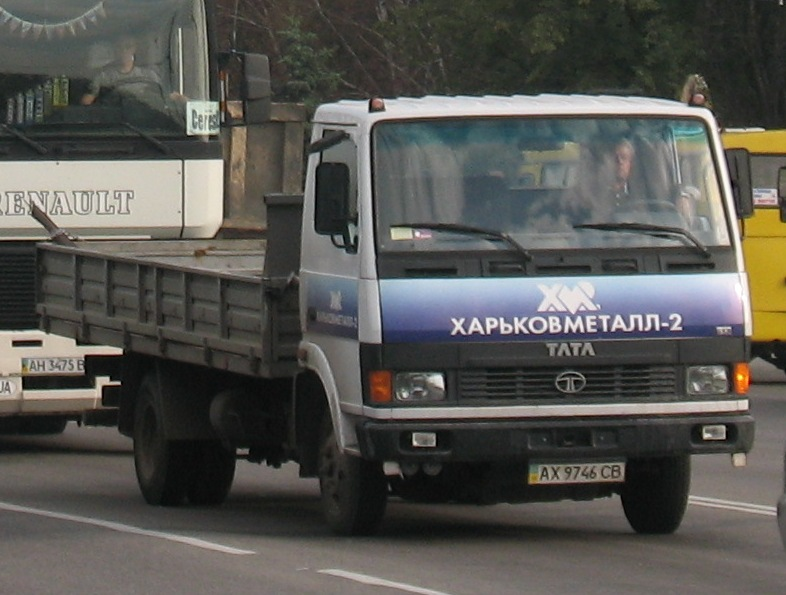

Overview
- Type: Truck
- Manufacturer: Tata Motors
- Assembly: Jamshedpur, Jharkhand (Tata Motors)

Body and chassis
- Class: truck

Dimensions
- Wheelbase: 3,800 mm (149.6 in)
- Length: 6,860 mm (270.1 in)
- Width: 2,075 mm (81.7 in)
- Height: 2,341 mm (92.2 in)

TATA LPT 613 is a truck produced by the Indian manufacturer Tata Motors. This truck is part of the TATA LPT family of trucks, based on second-generation Mercedes-Benz LN. In Ukraine, this model is manufactured in the city of Chornomorsk in the Odesa Oblast at the CJSC "ZAZ" and in the "Boryspil Bus Plant" in Prolisky, Kyiv Oblast. The trucks manufactured by the latter are sold under the brand name BAZ-T713 Podorozhnik. From the 2004 model year, the model is made in Russia by the company "Automobiles and engines of the Urals" under the name AMUR-4346.

== Powertrain ==
A reliable, time-tested engine Tata 697 NA, issued under the license from the Mercedes-Benz OM 352. 6-cylinder in-line, 5.755 liters with max power of 130 hp at 2,400 RPM and a peak torque of 416 - 430 Nm at 1,400 - 1,700 RPM, it works in pair with 5-speed manual transmission Tata GBS-40. PPC - with synchronizers on all forward gears, and a slippery gear for reverse gear. Clutch - friction, single disc, dry, with diaphragm spring. Engine Cooling - Liquid. Rechargeable battery - 120 A / h, 12 W.
