= MAZ-203 =

Belarus manufactured low-floor single-decker bus

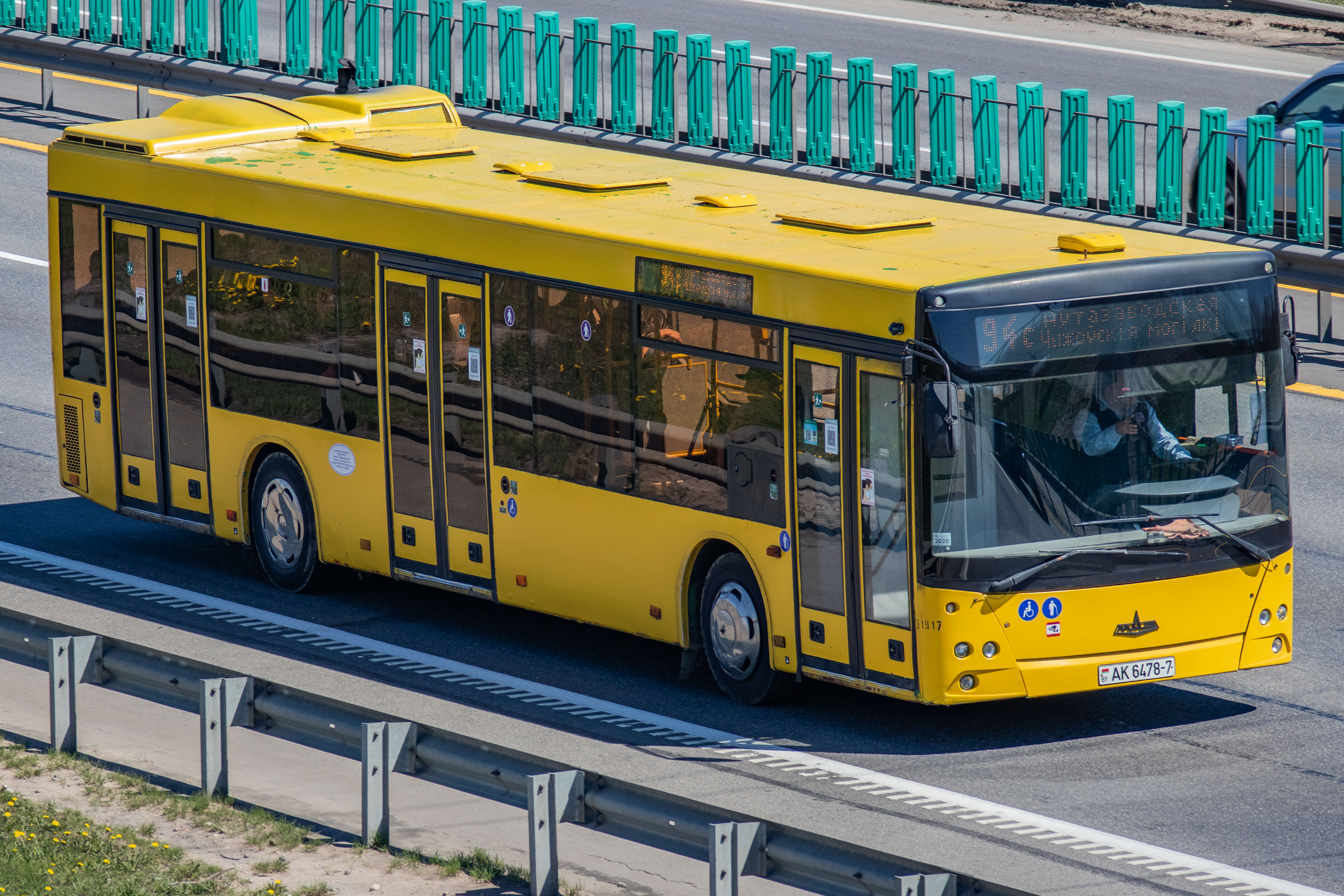
- MAZ-203

Overview
- Manufacturer: MAZ
- Production: 2006–present
- Assembly: Minsk, Belarus (MAZ); Kragujevac, Serbia (Vulović Transport)

Body and chassis
- Class: Single-decker city-bus
- Doors: 3; 2 (suburban variant)
- Floor type: Low-floor
- Chassis: MAZ

Powertrain
- Engine: Mercedes-Benz OM 906 LA; Deutz TCD 2013LO6; Euro III or Euro IV
- Capacity: 28—37 seats
- Power output: 205 (Mercedes-Benz) or 170 (Deutz)
- Transmission: automatic or mechanic ZF or Voith Diwa

Dimensions
- Length: 12,000 mm (39 ft 4 1/2 in)
- Width: 2,550 mm (8 ft 4 3/8 in)
- Height: 2,930 mm (9 ft 7 3/8 in) (3,050 mm [10 ft 1/8 in] with air-conditioning)
- Curb weight: 11,100 kg (24,500 lb) (kerb); 18,000 kg (40,000 lb) (full)

Chronology
- Predecessor: MAZ-103
- Successor: MAZ-303

The MAZ-203 is a fully low-floor single-decker bus. It is a representative of the second generation of MAZ city buses, being a successor to the MAZ-103. It has been built since 2006, there are over 100 models have been built already. MAZ 203 can be found in Poland, Ukraine, Russia and Romania. In Serbia, MAZ has been working in cooperation with local-based company BIK (Bus industries Kragujevac) for the manufacture of BIK-203, a bus manufactured on the basis of the platform of MAZ-203.

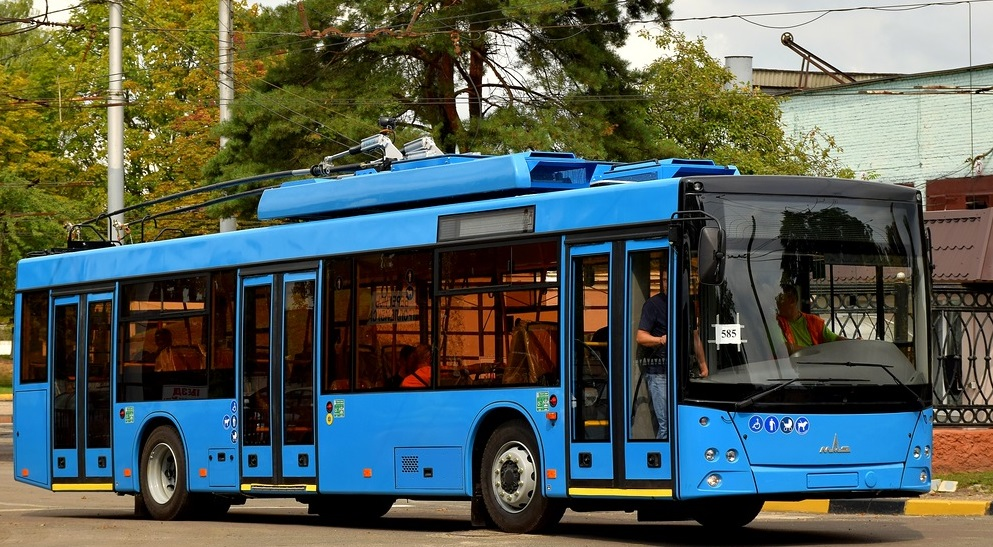
Trolleybus MAZ-203T in Gomel

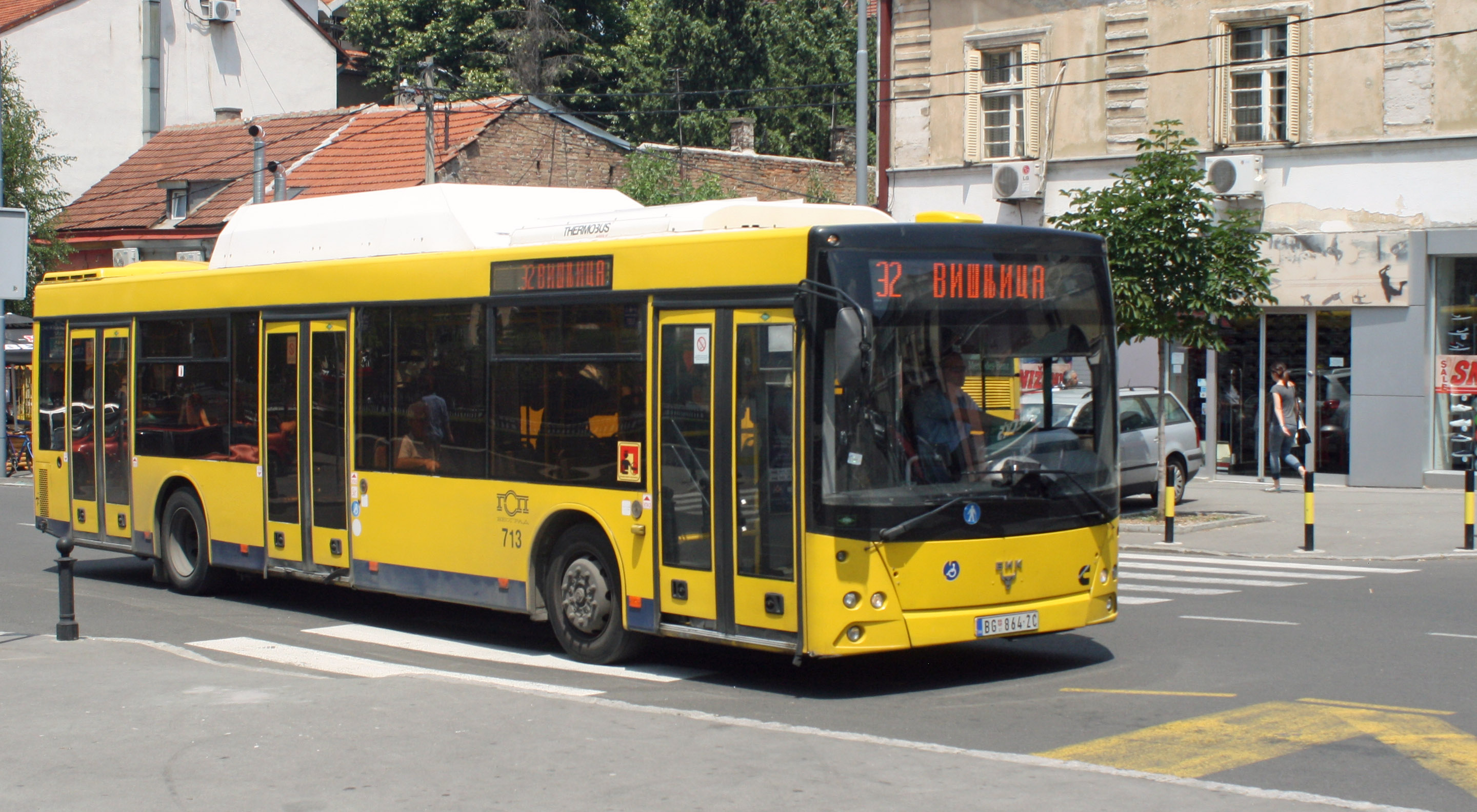
MAZ-203 CNG in Belgrade

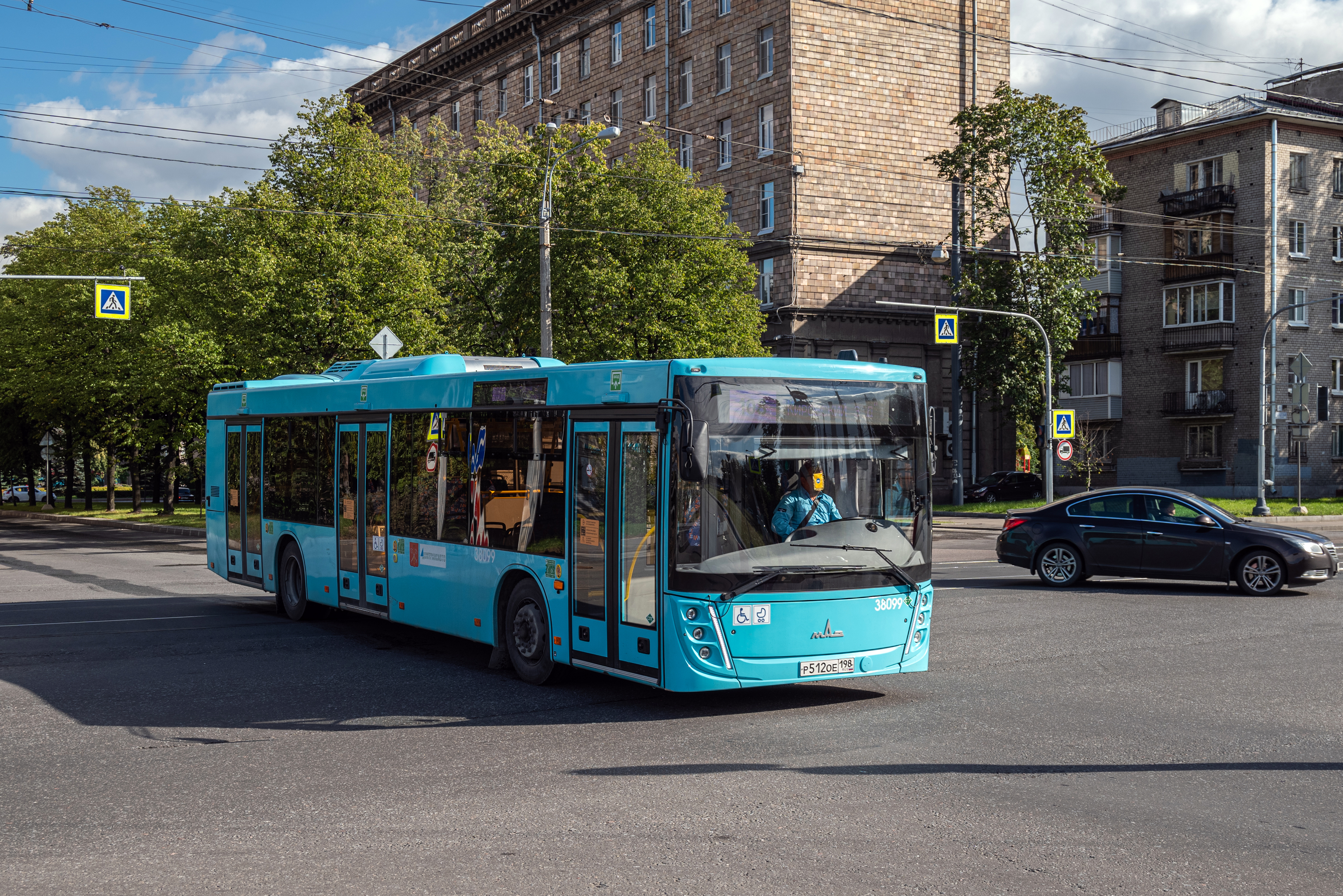
MAZ-203 LNG in Saint-Petersburg

There is also a trolleybus variant of the MAZ-203 built from 2008, MAZ-ETON T203 with electrical equipment of Eton, Belarus (GTO or IGBT).

== See also ==
- List of buses
