= Belkommunmash =

Belarusian automotive manufacturer

BKM Holding OJSC “HMC “BKM”
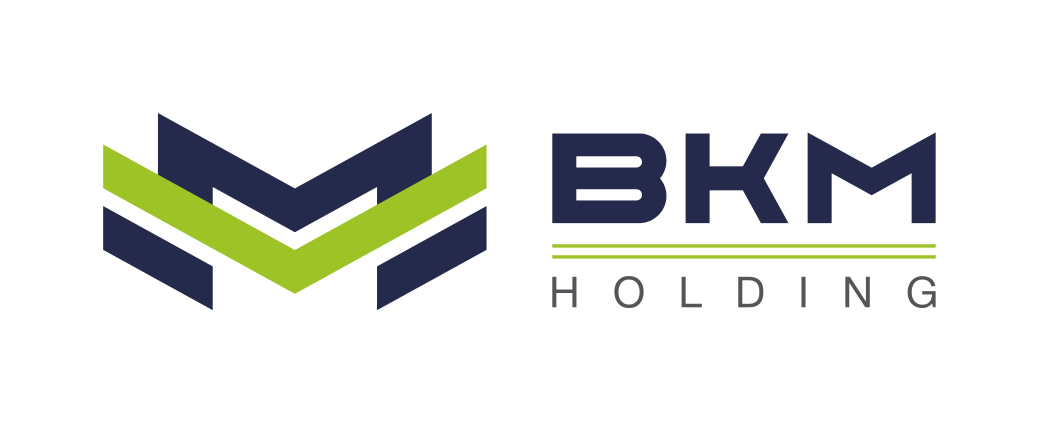
- Native name: Open Joint Stock Company «Holding Management Company «Belkommunmash»
- Company type: Joint-stock company
- Industry: Automotive
- Founded: July 1, 1973
- Headquarters: Minsk, Belarus
- Area served: Worldwide
- Key people: Taras Murog (general director)
- Products: Electric buses, trolleybuses, trams, hybrid buses
- Revenue: 122,097,000 Belarusian ruble (2021)
- Net income: −8,445,000 Belarusian ruble (2021)
- Total assets: 136,315,000 Belarusian ruble (2021)
- Parent: Ministry of Industry of the Republic of Belarus
- Website: holdingbkm.com/en/

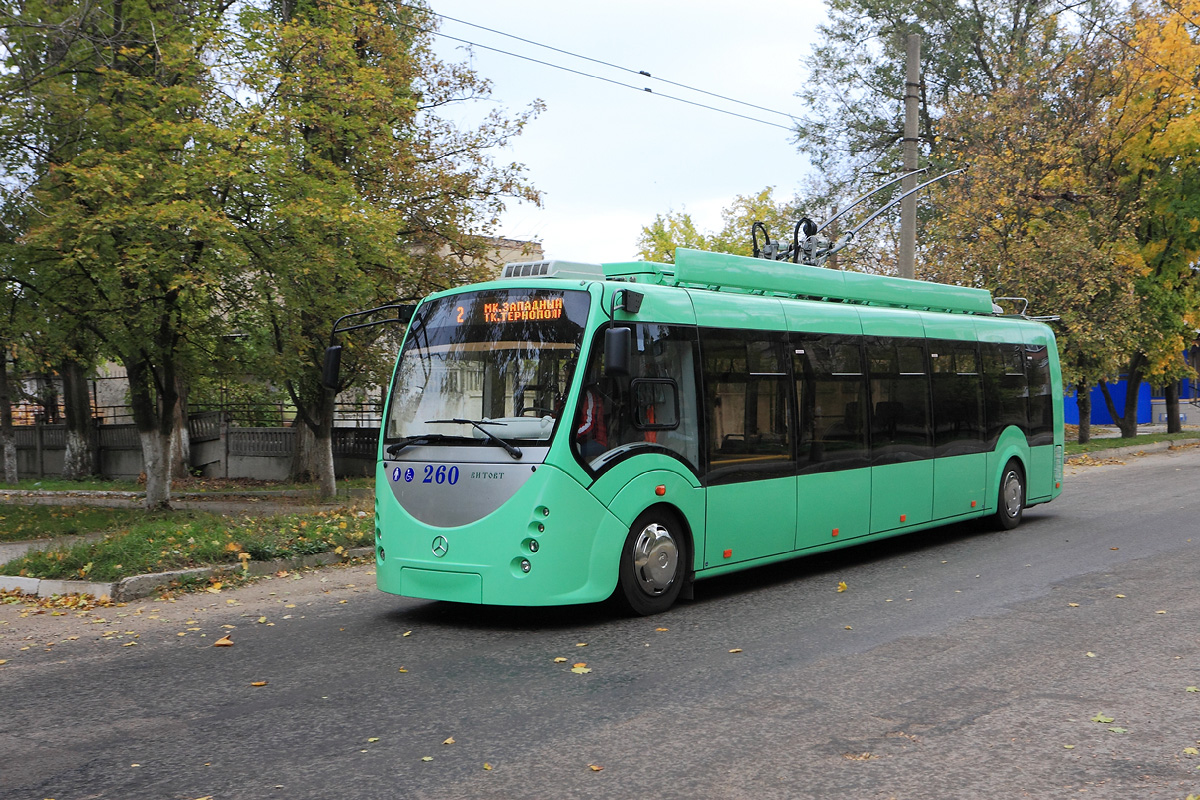
AKSM-420 trolleybus in Tiraspol. Note that the logo has been removed and replaced by a Mercedes-Benz sign on this particular bus.

OJSC "Holding Management Company "Belkommunmash" (Belarusian: ААТ "Кіруючая кампанія холдынгу «Белкамунмаш», Belkamunmash), is a Belarusian manufacturer of electric public transport vehicles. The enterprise was based on a tram and trolleybus repair facility which was opened in 1973. Today it is the leading industrial enterprise in Belarus in the field of manufacture and major overhaul of rolling stock for electric transportation in cities. Trolleybuses manufactured by Belkommunmash are operated in 7 cities in Belarus and over 40 cities in Russia, Ukraine, Kazakhstan, Kyrgyzstan, Mongolia, Moldova, Argentina, Bulgaria, Bosnia and Herzegovina and Serbia.

In June 2022, EU and Switzerland imposed sanctions on Belkommunmash.

== Electric bus ==
- Е420
- Е433
- Е321
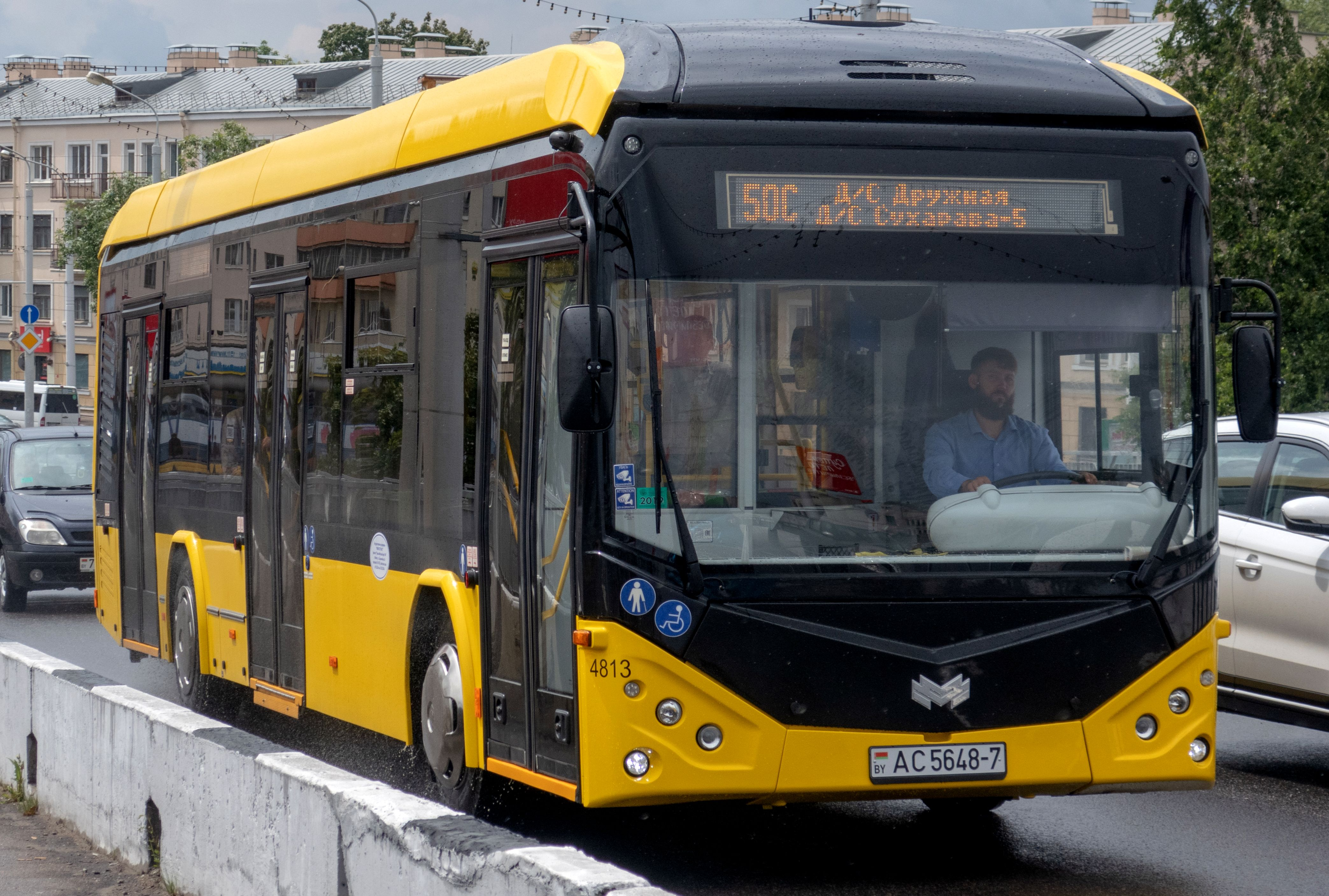
E321 in Minsk

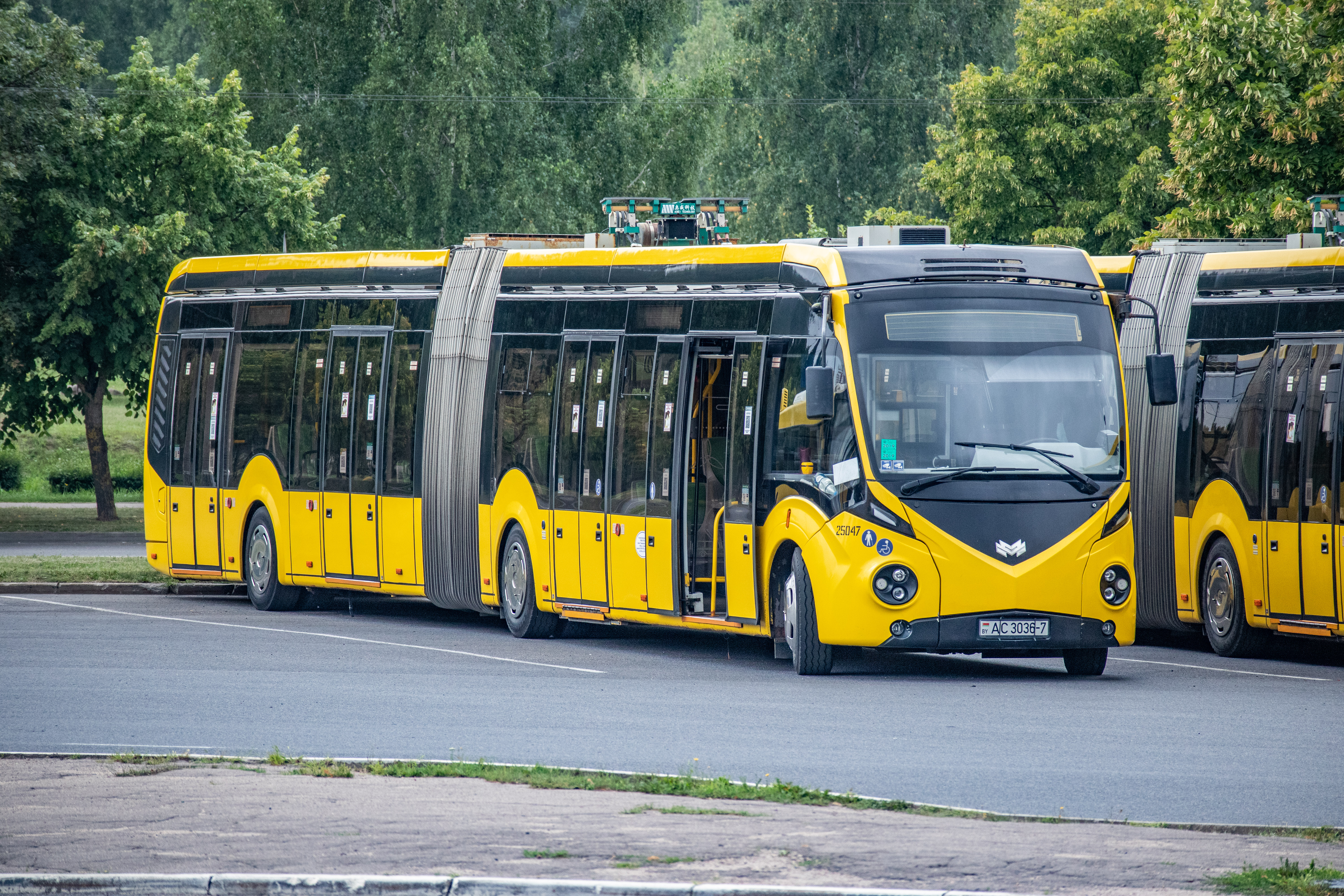
E433 in Minsk

== Trams ==
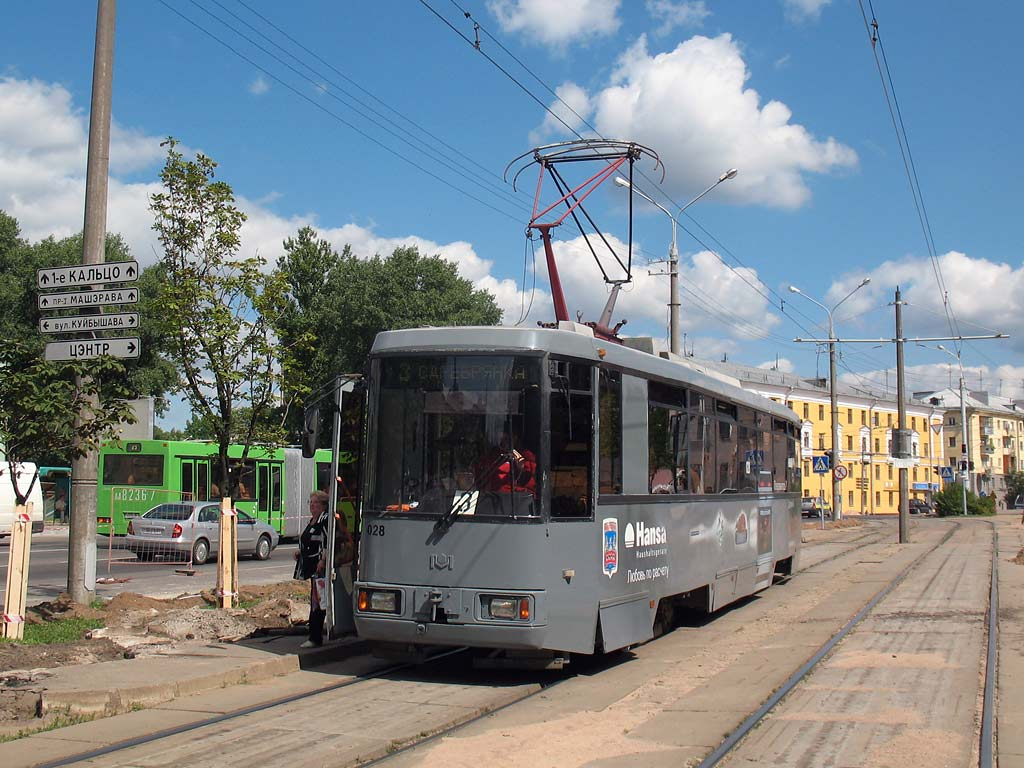
AKSM - first-generation tram in Minsk

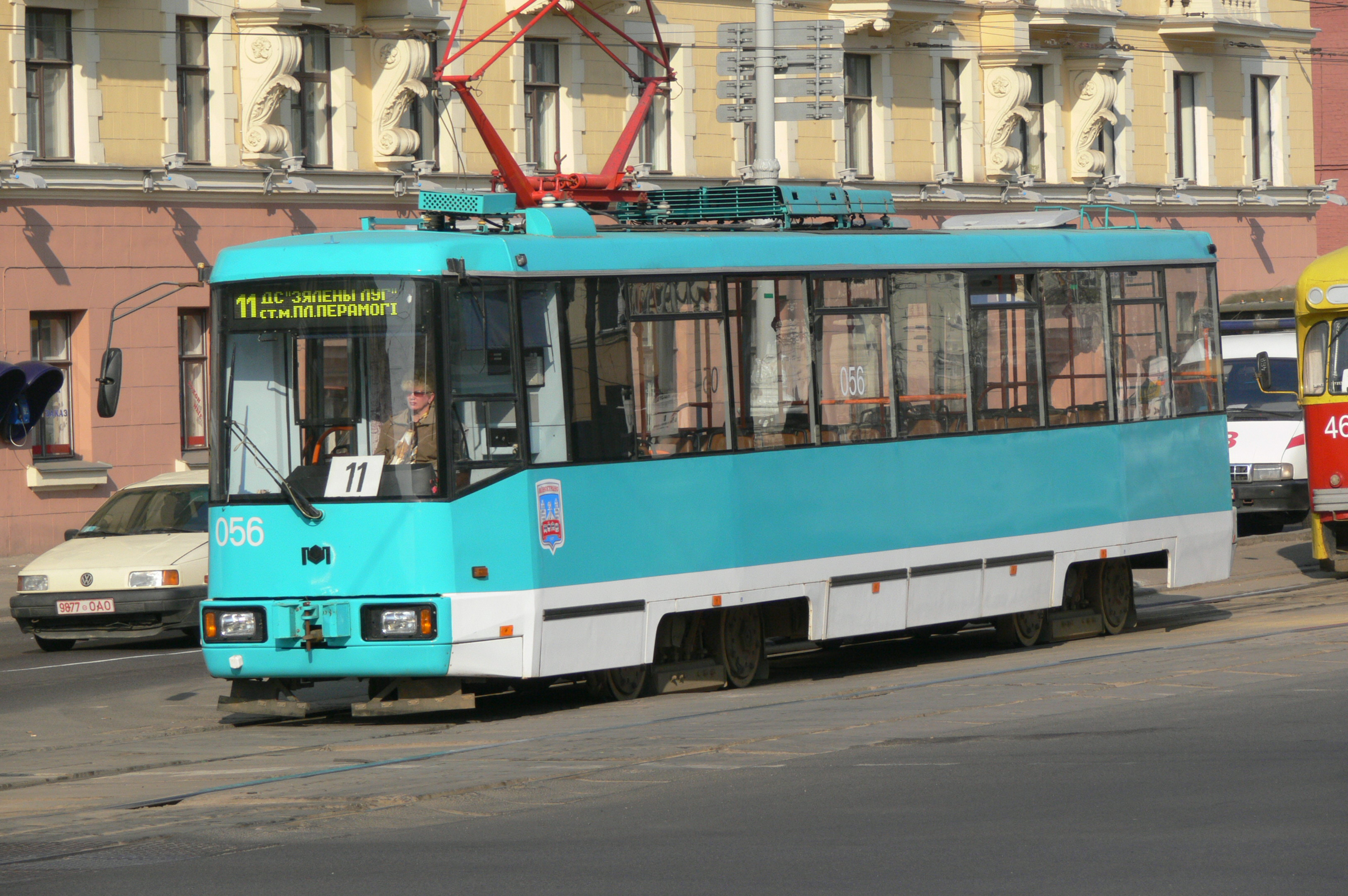
AKSM-60102 - second-generation tram in Minsk

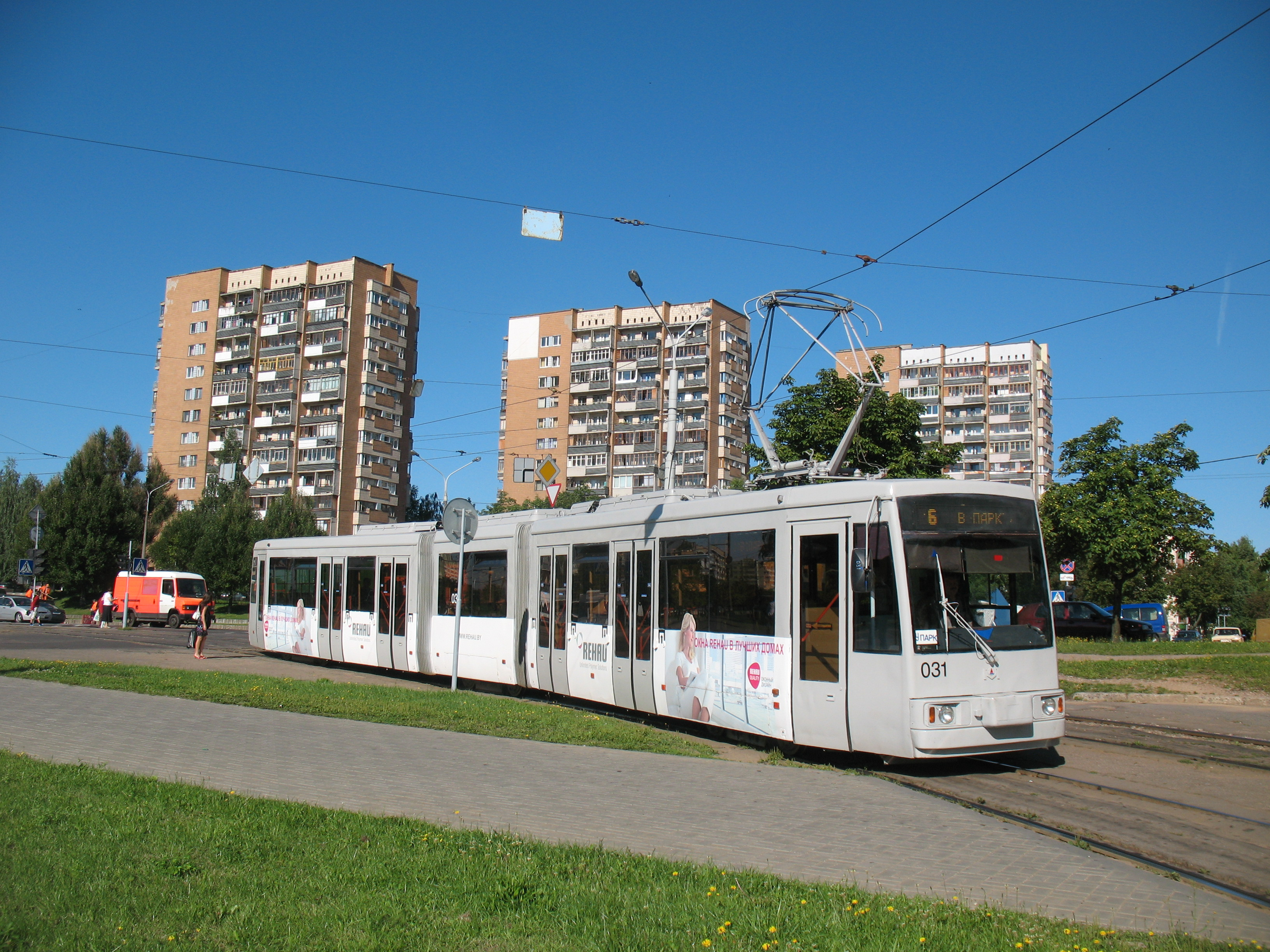
AKSM-743 - third-generation tram in Minsk

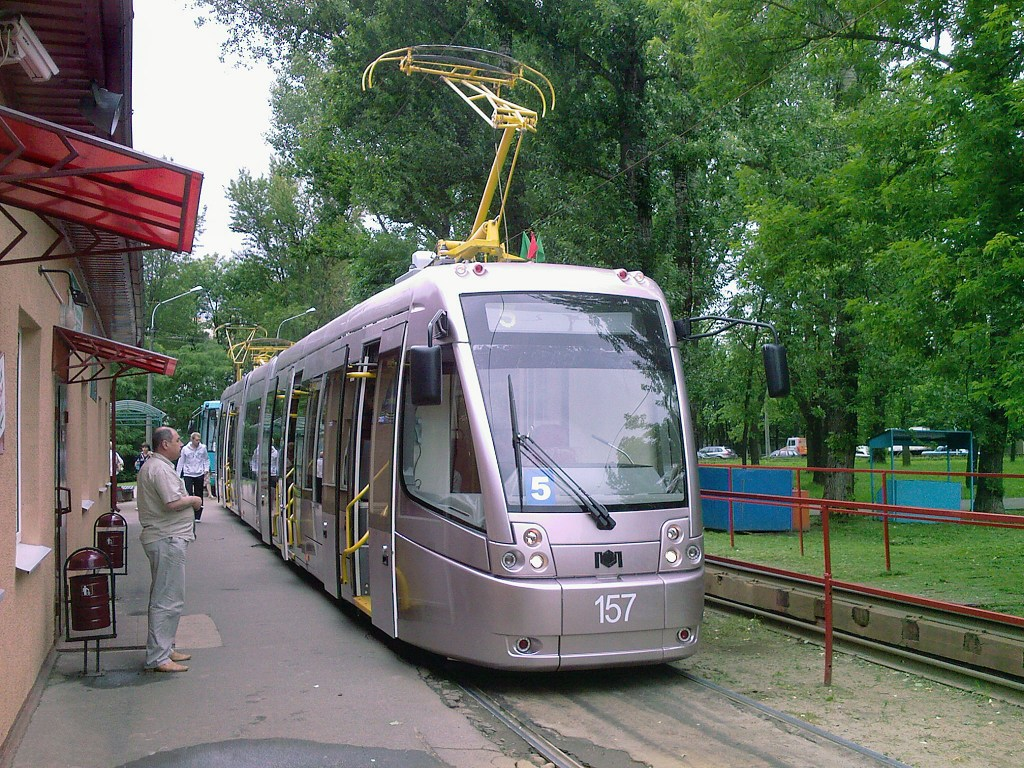
AKSM-843 - fourth-generation tram in Minsk

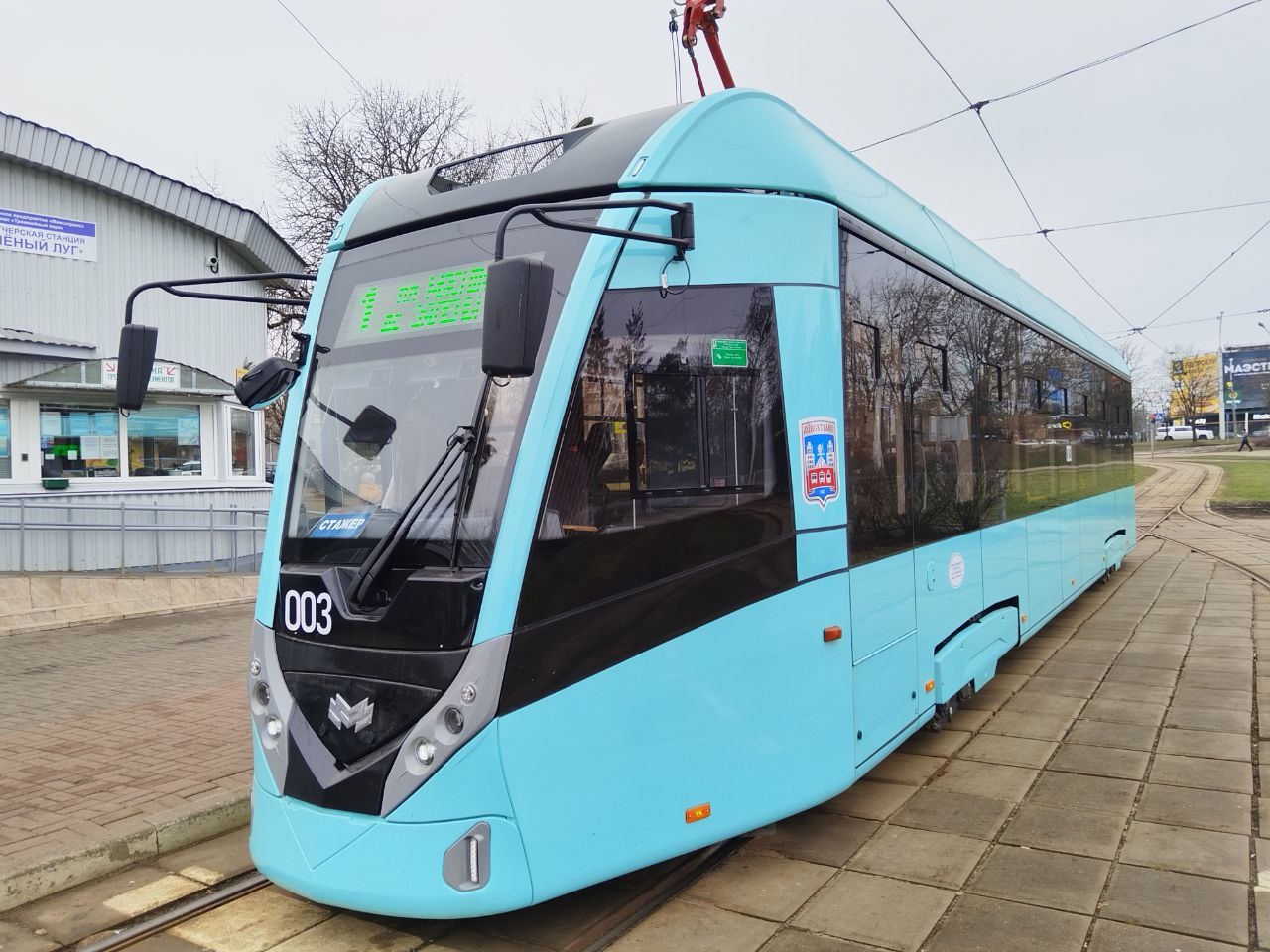
AKSM-T811 - fifth-generation tram in Minsk

== Duobus ==
- Vitovt Max Duo

== Trolleybuses ==
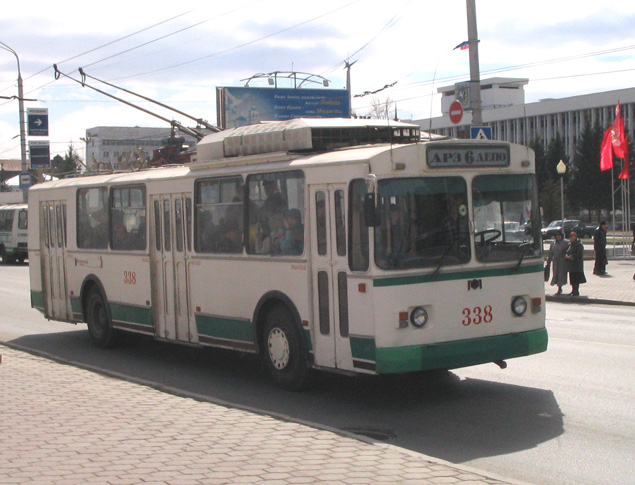
AKSM-101 trolley bus unified with ZiU-9 in Tomsk

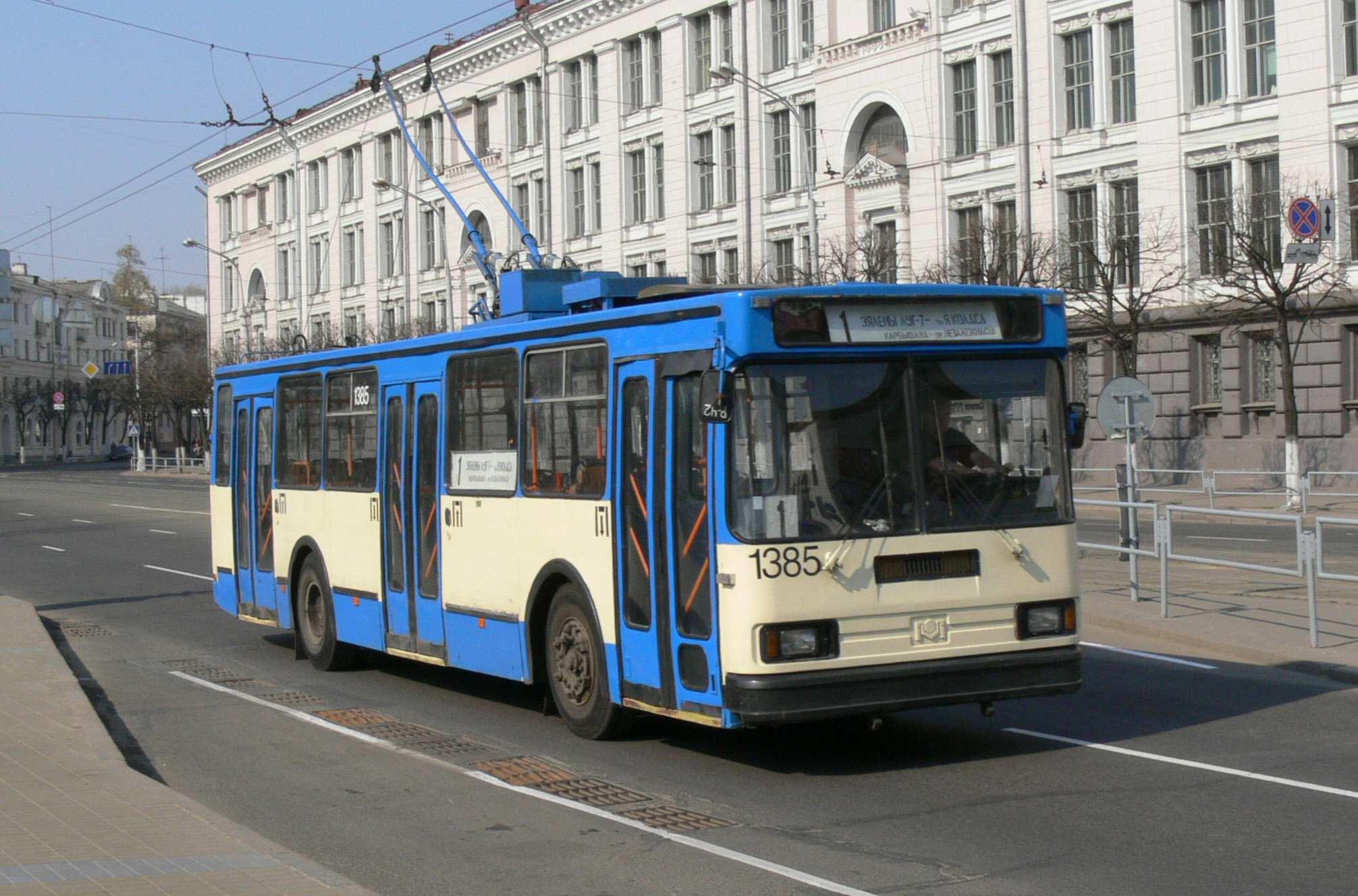
AKSM-201 - second-generation trolley bus in Minsk

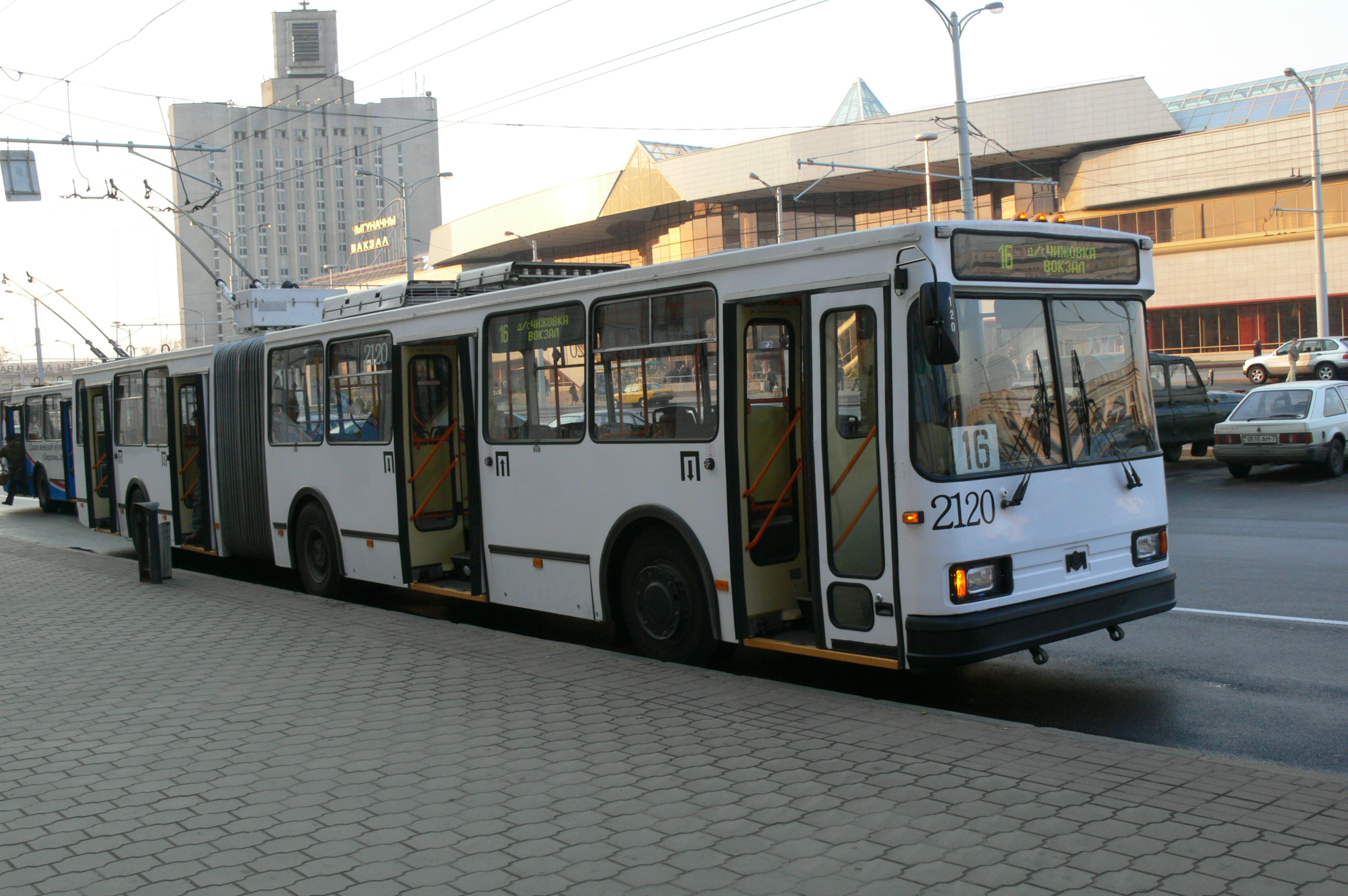
AKSM-213- second-generation articulated trolley bus in Minsk

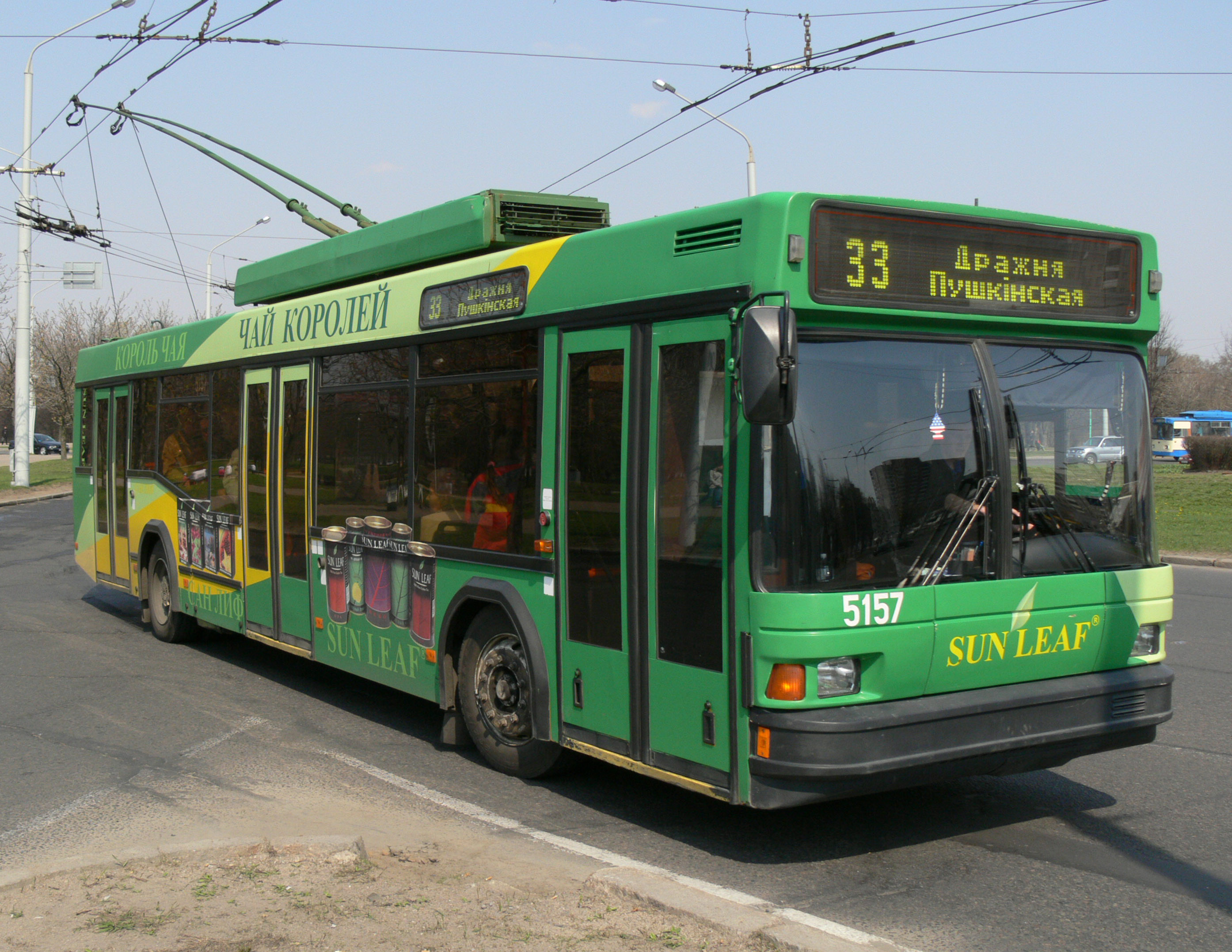
AKSM-221 - low-floor trolley bus unified with MAZ-103T in Minsk

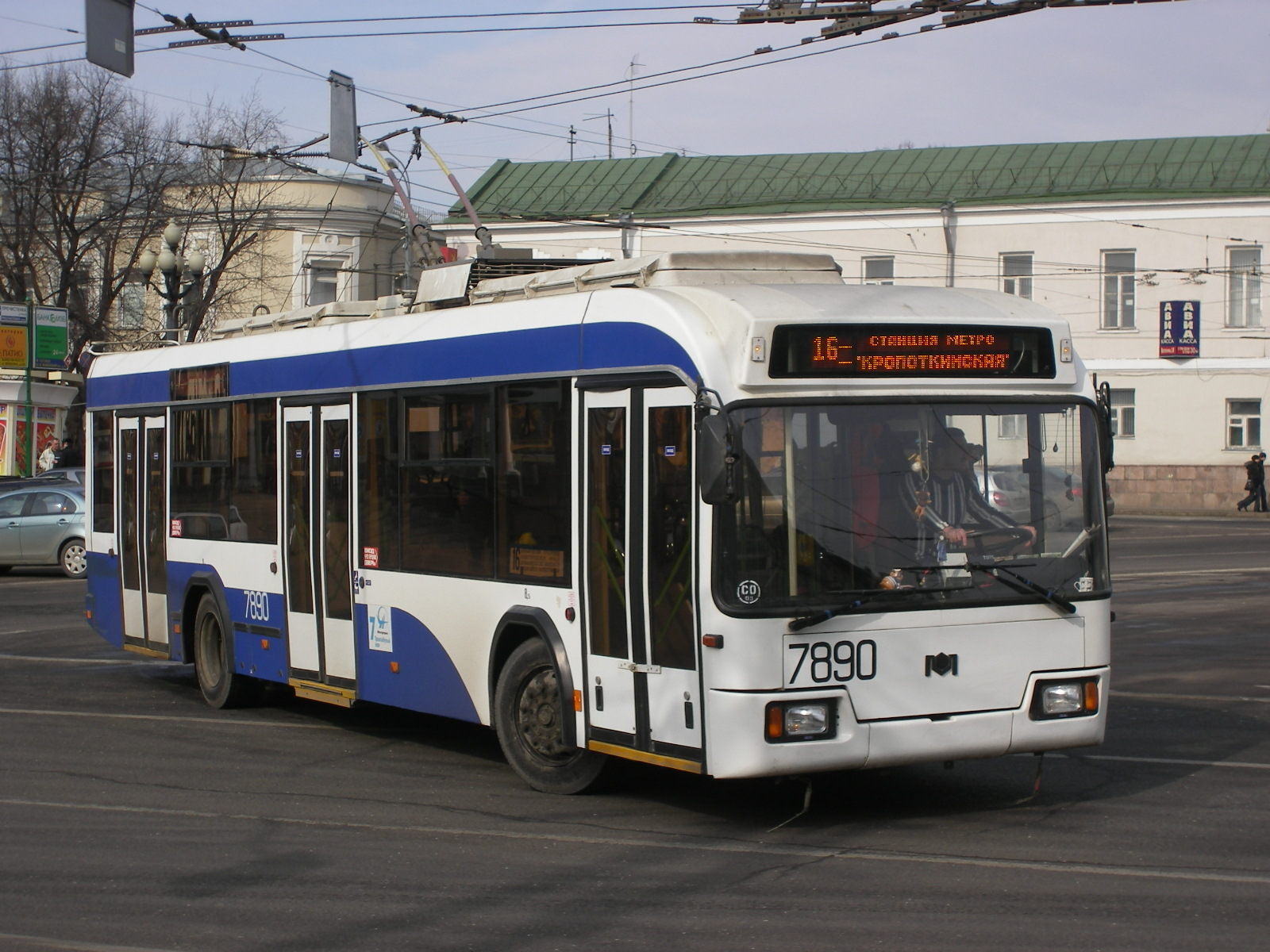
AKSM-321 - low-floor third-generation trolley bus in Moscow

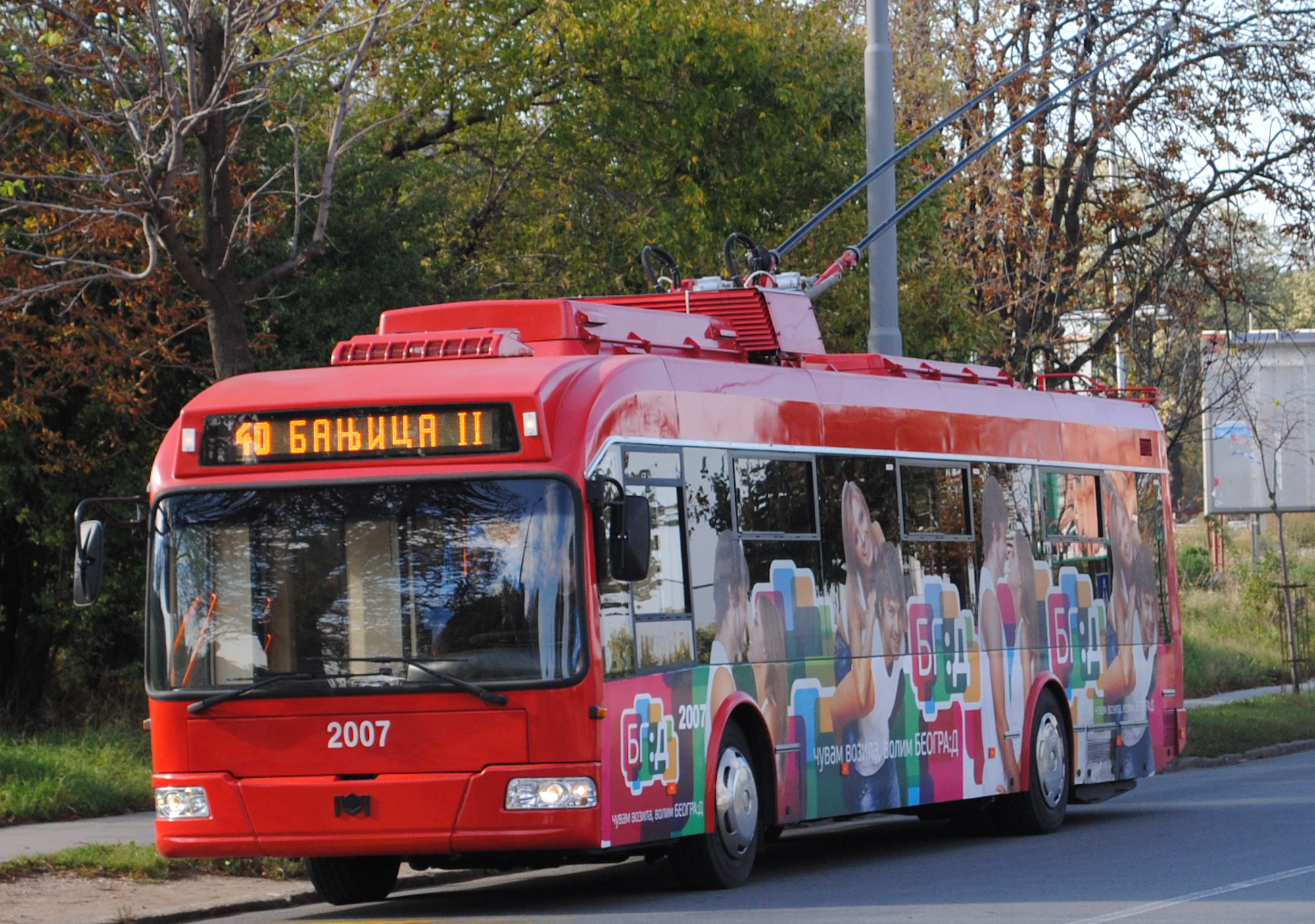
AKSM-321 - low-floor third-generation trolley bus in Belgrade

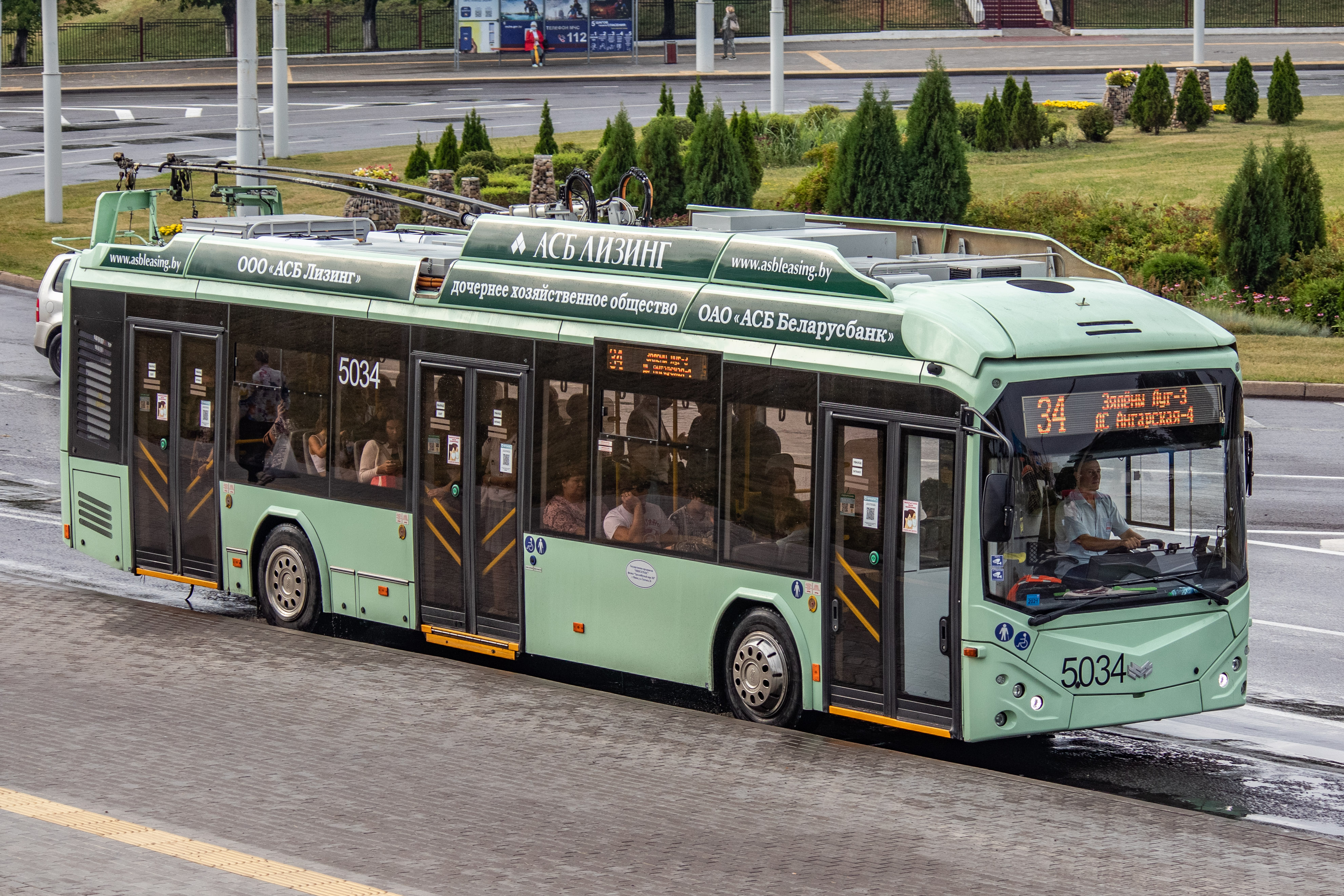
AKSM-32100D - low-floor third-generation trolley bus with batteries in Minsk

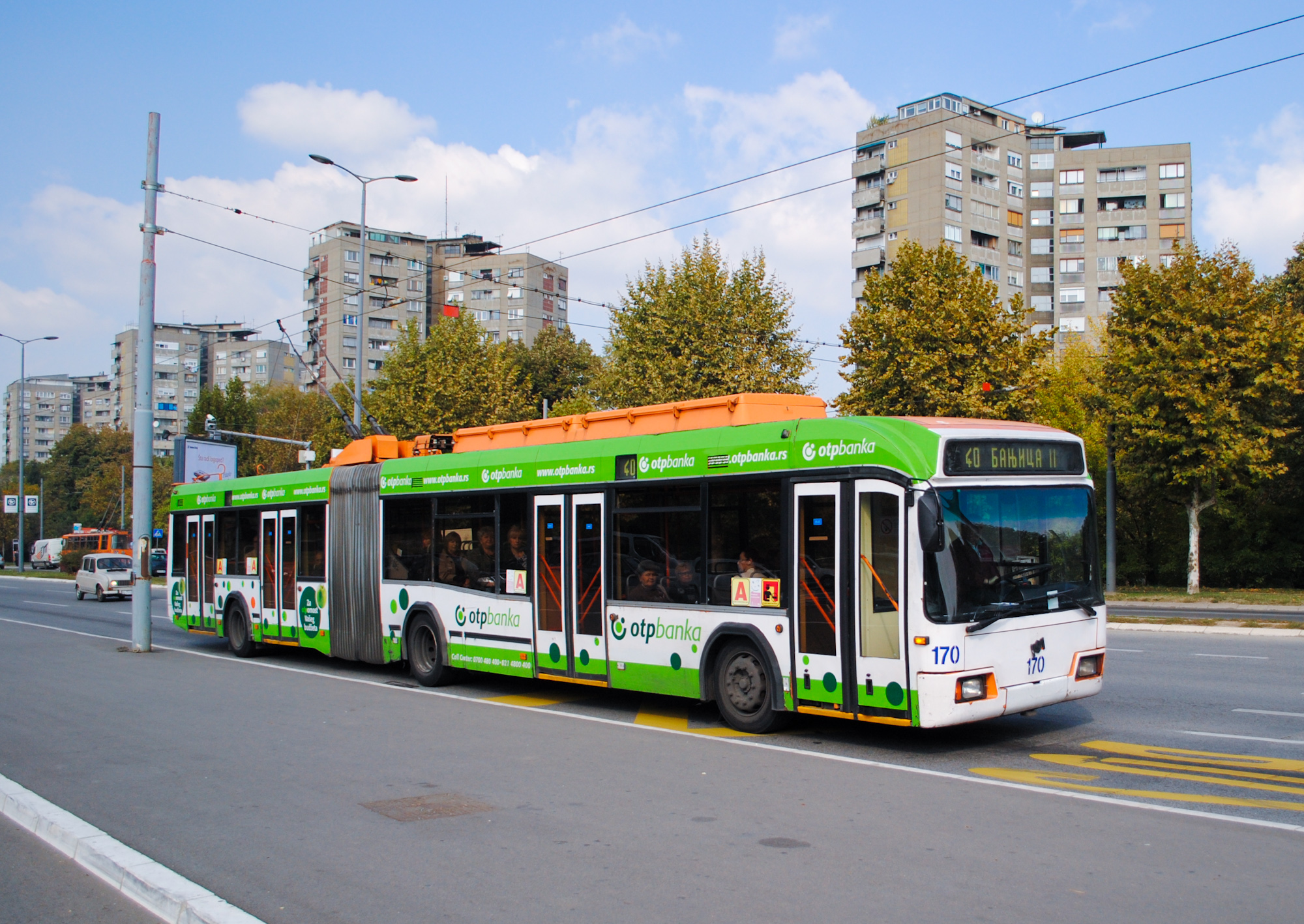
AKSM-333 - third-generation articulated three-axle low-floor trolley bus in Belgrade

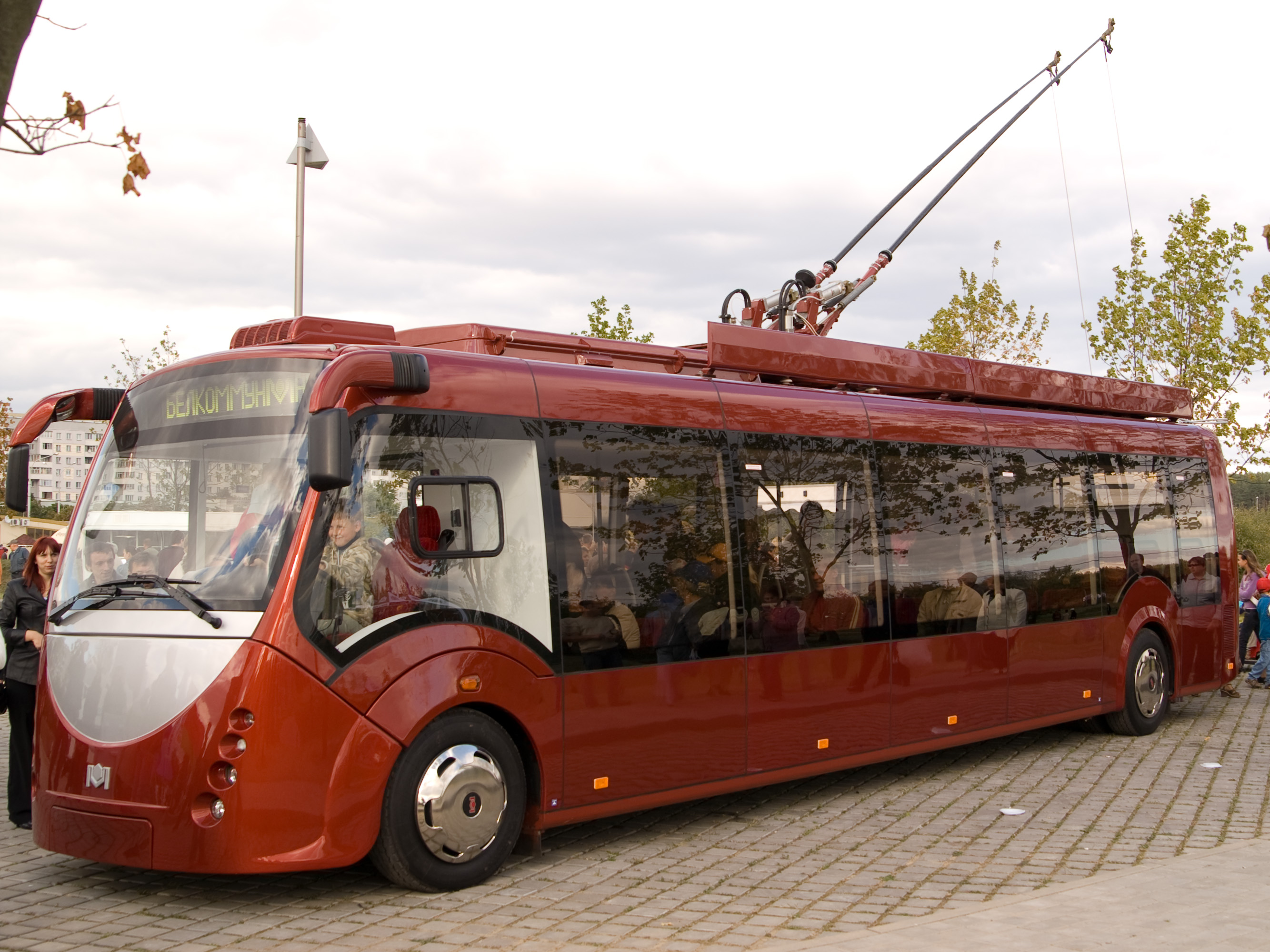
AKSM-420 - fourth-generation low-floor trolley bus in Minsk

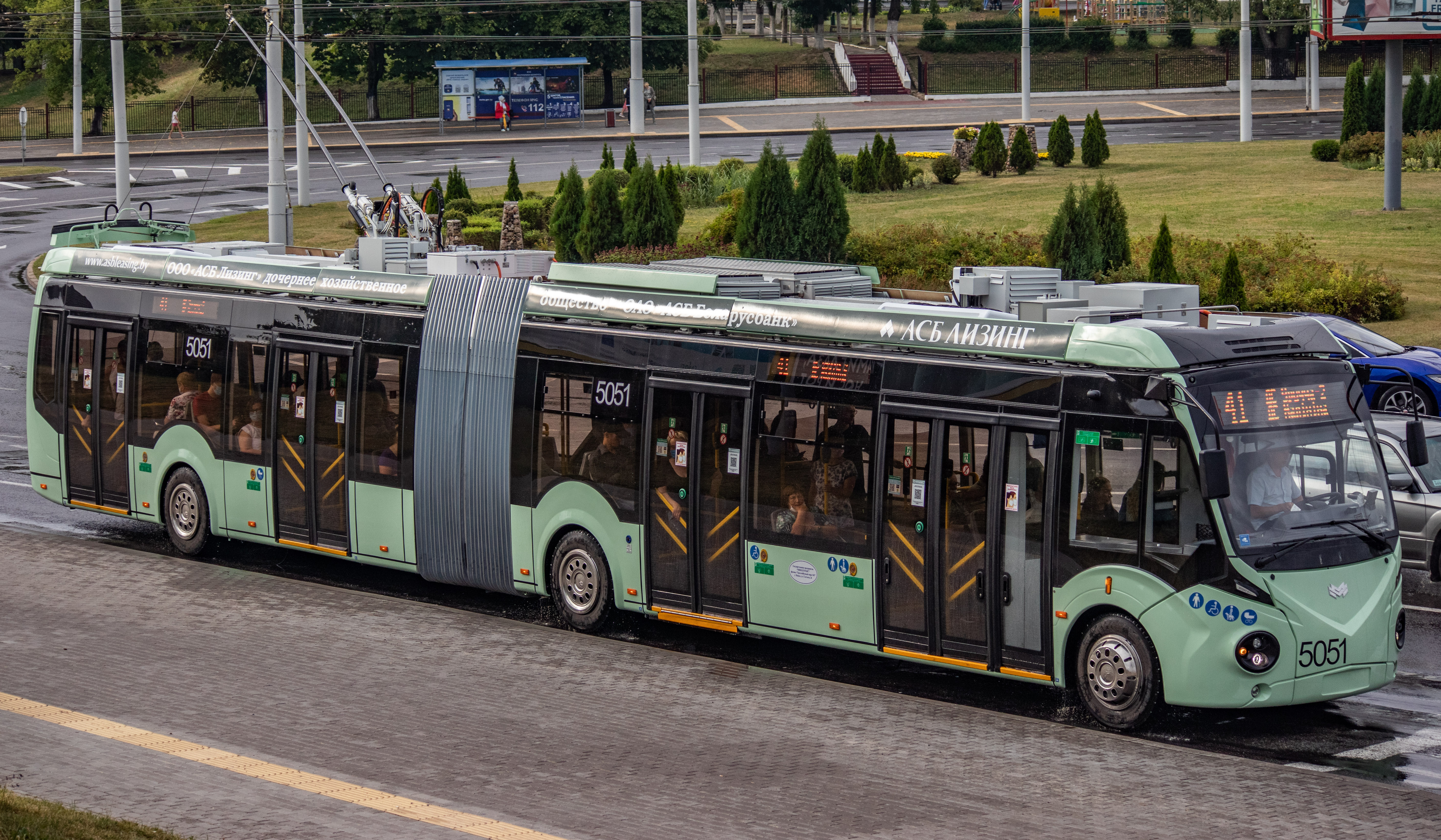
AKSM-43300D - fourth-generation articulated three-axle low-floor trolley bus in Minsk

== Hybrid buses ==
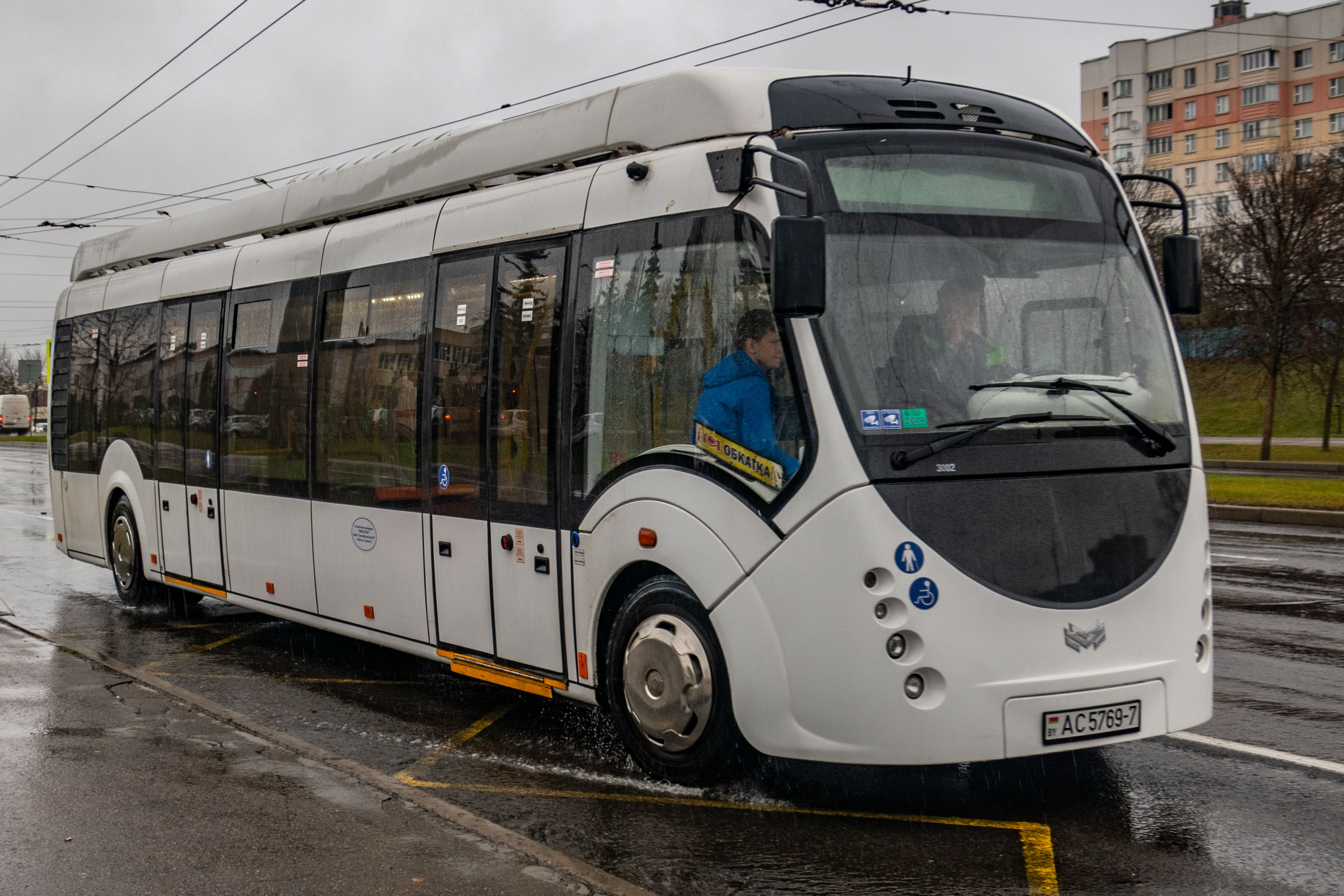
AKSM-4202K "Vitovt Hybrid"
