= Prolisky =

Rural locality in Kyiv Oblast, Ukraine

Prolisky Проліски
- Map of Ukraine with Prolisky highlighted Prolisky (Ukraine)
- Coordinates: 50°23′36″N 30°47′18″E
- Country: Ukraine
- Oblast: Kyiv Oblast
- Raion: Boryspil Raion
- Hromada: Prystolychchia rural hromada

Government
  - Mayor: Mykola Shmayun

Area
  - Total: 3,493 km^{2} (1,349 sq mi)
- Elevation: 130 m (430 ft)

Population (21 October 2011)
  - Total: 6,700 (local council area)
  - Density: 3,622/km^{2} (9,380/sq mi)
- Time zone: UTC+2 (EET)
  - Summer (DST): UTC+3 (EEST)
- Postal code: 08322
- Area code: +380 44
- License plate: AI / 10

Prolisky (Ukrainian: Проліски) is a settlement on the eastern edge of the city of Kyiv, in Boryspil Raion, Kyiv Oblast of Ukraine. It belongs to Prystolychchia rural hromada, one of the hromadas of Ukraine.

The name of the village is derived from the Ukrainian word "Пролісок", which can be translated as "snowdrop" or "Galanthus".

== Local government ==
The local council is located in Shchaslyve, a neighboring village located on the opposite side of the Boryspil Highway, which connects Kyiv and the Boryspil International Airport and is part of Highway M-03, Kyiv-Kharkiv. Several big projects have been planned in the area because of the UEFA Euro 2012, including the construction of the new Business Park "Prolisky" and the Boryspil Plaza. The area is home to the Ukrainian soccer club FC Knyazha Shchaslyve. The new Master Plan of the development of the local council area projects the growth of the population in Prolisky-Schalyve to 14,200 people.

== Economy ==
The Boryspil Autoplant Closed Joint Stock Company, the PrivatLeasing Company (PrivatBank), a branch of the Joint Stock Bank "Pivdennyj", and АМАКО (American Machinery Company) are located in Prolisky. The village main employers include also the Open Joint Stock Company Dnipronaftoprodukt, several customs business companies, and a hypermarket Fozzy.

== Education ==
The Institute of Animal Breeding and Genetics of the Ukrainian National Academy of Agricultural Sciences is located in the nearby village Chubynske.

== Culture ==
Recreational areas in Prolisky include a pine forest mixed with birch groves. A riding center and the 10 hectares landscape reserve with oak grove are located in Chubynske.

The recently built Ukrainian Orthodox Church of All Saints, Kyiv Patriarchate, is located in Prolisky (see History of Christianity in Ukraine).

== Transportation ==
The Heorhiy Kirpa train station in the Darnytsia rayon of Kyiv is located 1.5 km from the village. Boryspilska is the closest subway station on the Syretsko–Pecherska line of the Kyiv Metro, reachable by marshrutka.
