= Marhanets train accident =

Locomotive accident

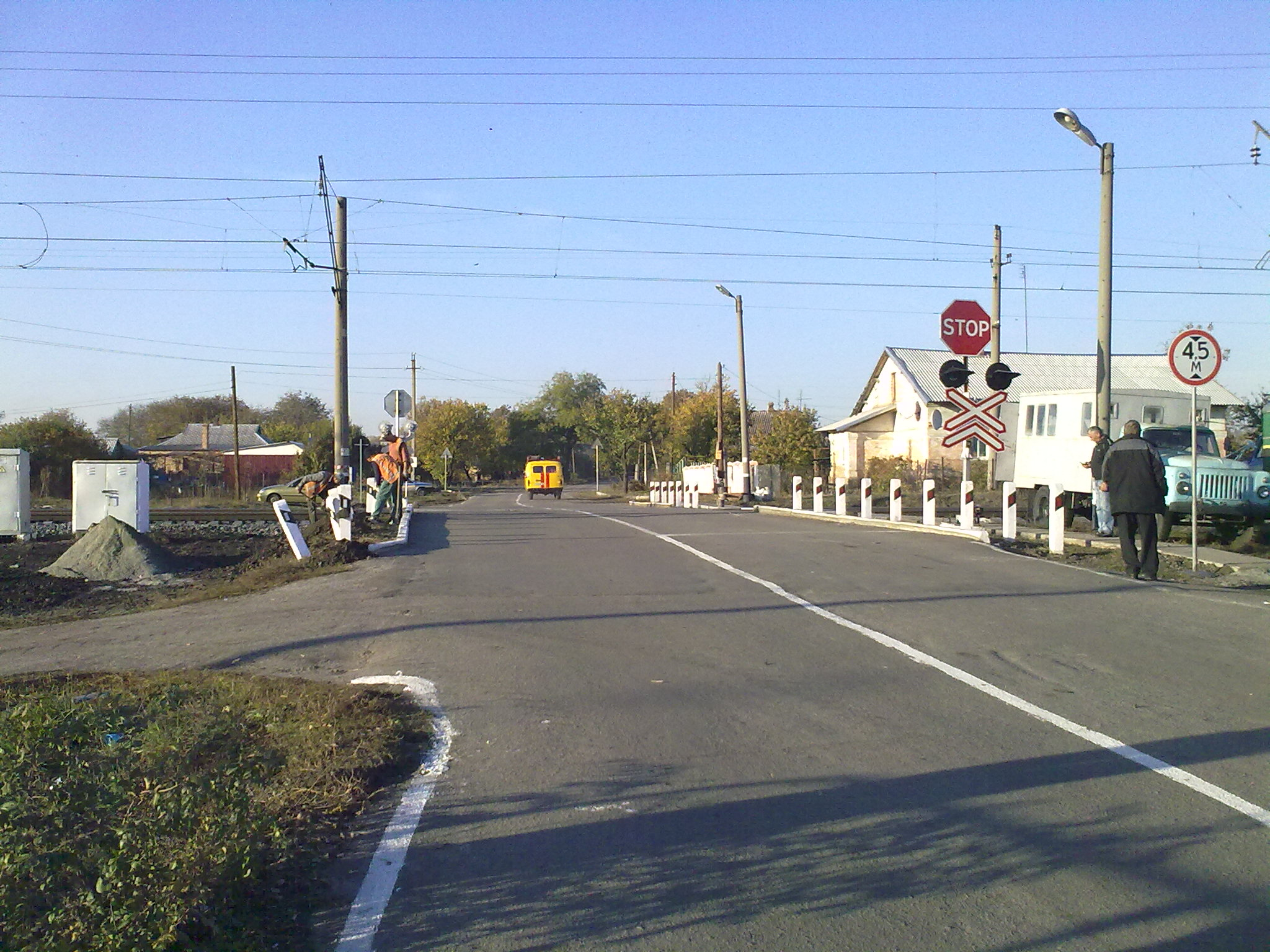
- A railway crossing near Marhanets where the collision occurred

Details
- Date: 12 October 2010; 08:30 a.m. local time (05:30 UTC)
- Location: Marhanets, Dnipropetrovsk Oblast
- Coordinates: 47°39′05″N 34°35′02″E
- Country: Ukraine
- Line: Zaporizhzhia-Marhanets
- Operator: Ukrainian Railways
- Incident type: Level crossing collision
- Cause: Violation of traffic rules

Statistics
- Trains: 1
- Passengers: 54
- Deaths: 45
- Injured: 9

The Marhanets train accident occurred on 12 October 2010, at Marhanets, Dnipropetrovsk Oblast, Ukraine when a train collided with a passenger bus on a railroad level crossing. Forty-three people were reported dead and nine injured. The bus driver, whose actions allegedly caused the collision, was killed in the accident as well. The collision was the worst single road accident in Ukraine's history by number of victims.

== Accident ==
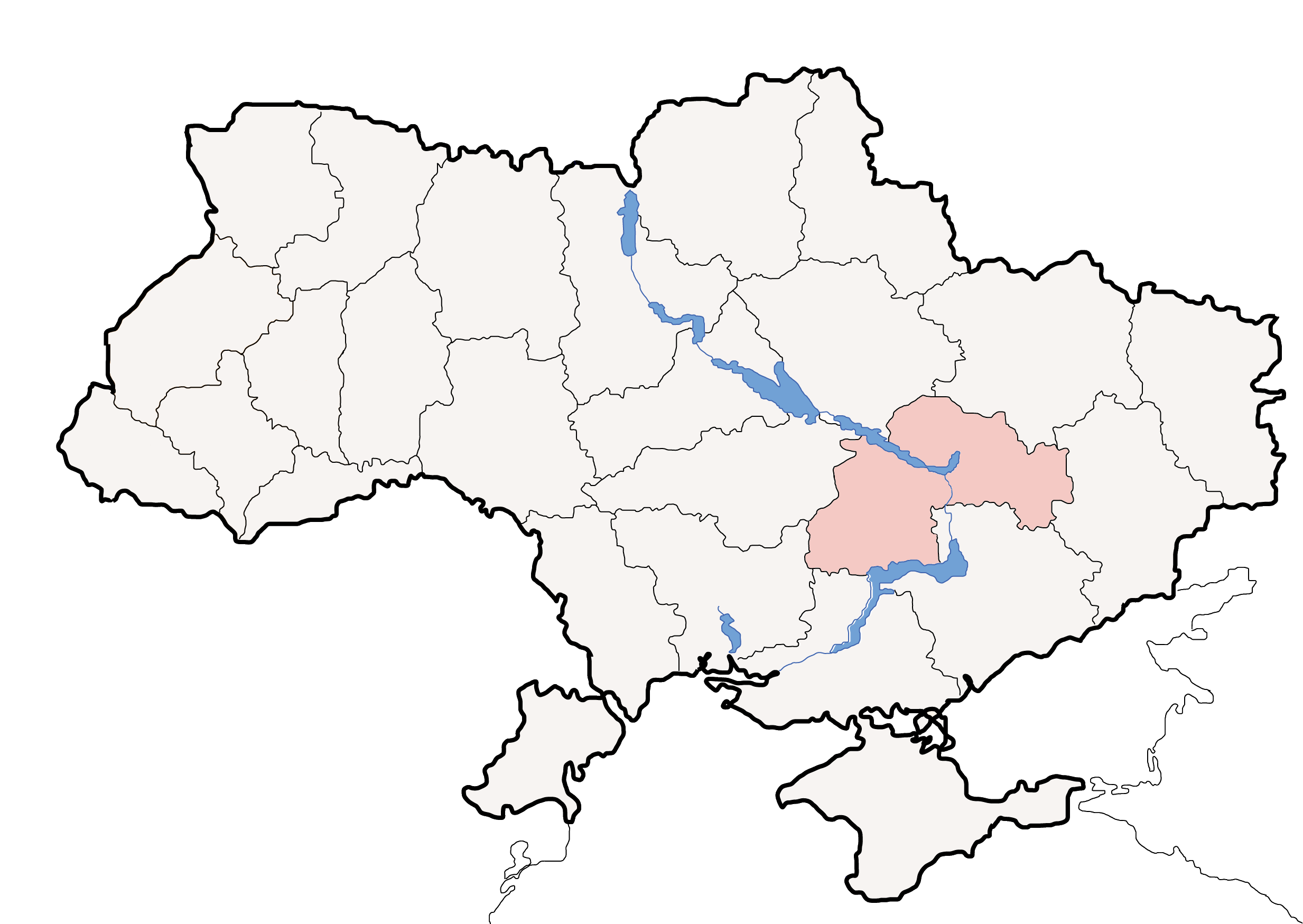
Dnipropetrovsk Oblast in Ukraine

The collision between a BAZ A079 midibus carrying around 48 passengers and a VL8 locomotive occurred at 08:30 a.m. local time (05:30 UTC) at an unstaffed automated railway crossing. Of those who were killed, 38 died at the scene and the others in hospitals from their injuries.

Ukrzaliznytsia's press service reported that a preliminary theory on the cause of the accident was the violation of traffic rules by the driver of the bus.

Reportedly, the locomotive was sent to replace another VL-8, which was damaged after hitting a tractor at another railroad crossing earlier that day.

== Reaction of the authorities ==
The Cabinet of Ministers of Ukraine planned to allocate ₴100,000 (approx. 12,600 US dollars) to each family of those killed and injured in a collision. Officials said this was the deadliest vehicle accident in the country's history. President Viktor Yanukovych, on a visit to the region at the time, declared Wednesday the 13th a day of national mourning. Yanukovych also ordered for an investigation into the incident to be carried out in order to determine who bore responsibility for the crash and instructed transport officials to install automated crossing gates at all railway crossings to prevent cars, buses and trucks from ignoring signals.

Road and railway accidents are common in Ukraine, where the roads are in poor condition, vehicles are poorly maintained, and drivers and passengers routinely disregard safety and traffic rules.

== See also ==
- Scânteia train accident
