= 2020 Lutsk hostage crisis =

Hostage crisis in Lutsk, Ukraine

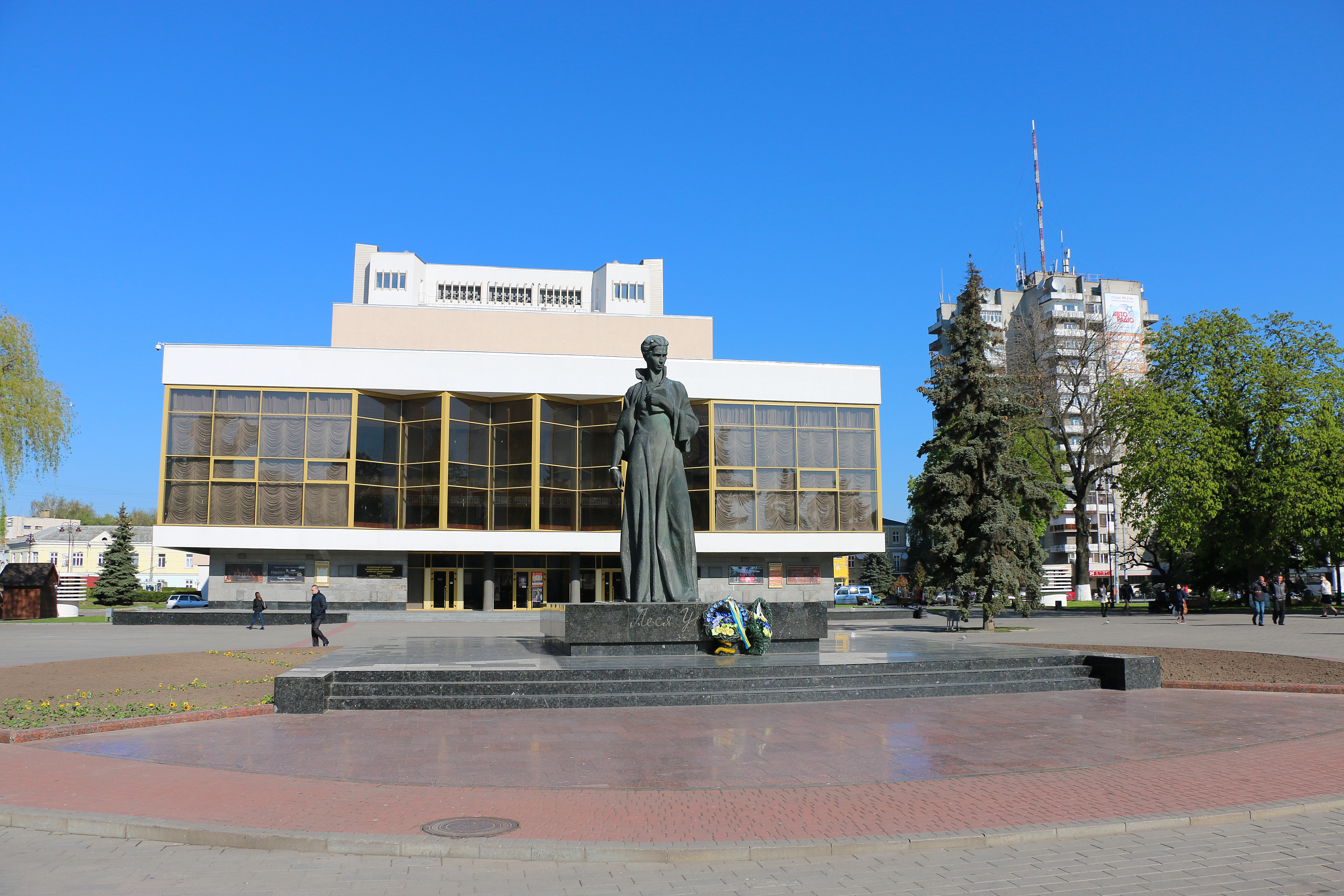
- The bus with hostages located on Teatralna Square near the Lesia Ukrainka monument
- Location: Lutsk, Volyn Oblast, Ukraine
- Date: 21 July 2020
- Weapons: AKS-74U, revolver, RGD-5 grenades, bombing
- Deaths: 0
- Injuries: 0
- Victim: 13 hostages
- Perpetrator: Maksym Kryvosh
- Motive: Eco-terrorism

On 21 July 2020, a hostage situation took place in Lutsk, Volyn Oblast, Ukraine. Maksym Kryvosh seized a BAZ A079 bus and barricaded himself and 13 passengers inside at the Teatralna Square. The crisis was eventually resolved with the release of the hostages and Kryvosh's arrest.

== Events ==
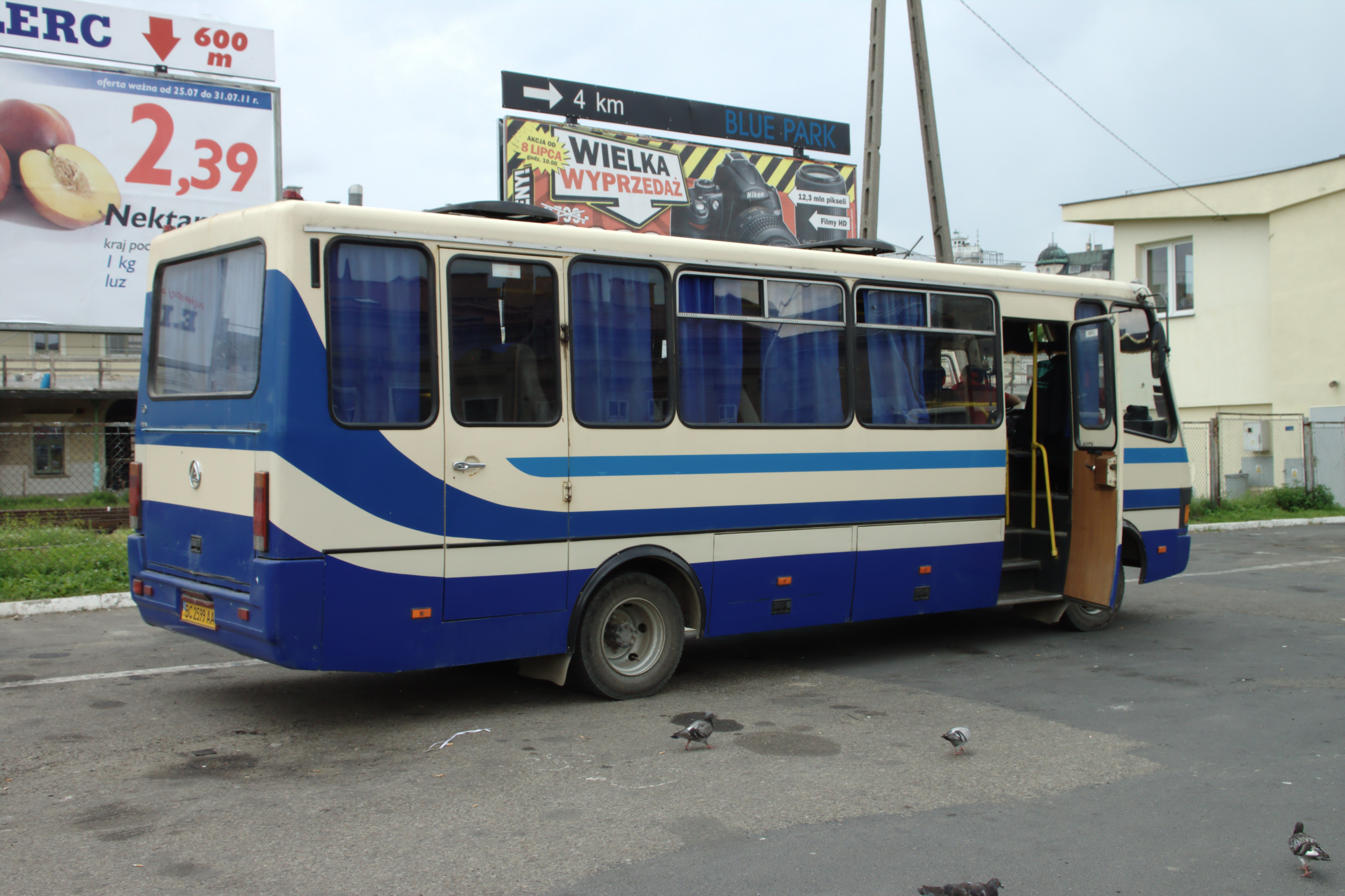
A BAZ A079 bus

=== Before the crisis ===
External videos
- Earthlings documentary film

Before seizing the bus, Maksym Kryvosh wrote on Twitter that "the state is the first terrorist" and made demands that heads of courts, the High Council of Justice, the Prosecutor General of Ukraine, the Minister of Justice of Ukraine, the director of the prison service, the Prime Minister of Ukraine, the Verkhovna Rada (Ukraine's parliament), the Minister of Defense of Ukraine, the Chairperson of the Security Service of Ukraine and various heads of churches post video messages on social media expressing their name, position and stating that they are терорист в законі (a "terrorist in law"). In addition, he demanded that President of Ukraine Volodymyr Zelenskyy publish an appeal to all to watch the 2005 documentary film Earthlings, a documentary film about human exploitation of animals.

=== Bus seizure ===
Kryvosh captured a bus en route from Krasnylivka to Berestechko via Lutsk. Kryvosh had a backpack and a travel bag. The captured bus stopped at Teatralna Square near the Lesia Ukrainka monument. According to Deputy of Interior Minister of Ukraine Anton Herashchenko, the terrorist who took the hostages called the police at 9:25 am at the same day and introduced himself as "Maksim Plokhoy", claiming to have a bomb.

Due to the seizure of the bus, the city center was blocked. The police began Operation Hostage, and the Security Service of Ukraine introduced the Boomerang plan. Investigators of the National Police of Ukraine in Volyn Oblast qualified the seizer of the bus under Article 147 of the Criminal Code of Ukraine (taking hostages). The police initially reported that there were 20 people on the bus, but the number of people on board was later confirmed to be 13.

Interior Minister Arsen Avakov flew to Lutsk. The President of Ukraine Volodymyr Zelenskyy stated that he was keeping the situation under control and was trying to resolve the crisis without casualties.

Journalist Yuriy Butusov said that the perpetrator had called him, demanding that journalists come to the bus.

According to preliminary information, Kryvosh fired several shots at the police and threw a grenade at them, which did not explode. Later three explosions were reported near the bus, the city police office came under fire.

Natalia Bosa, one of the hostages of the bus, said after her release that Kryvosh treated the hostages well and offered them a bucket as a toilet.

By 7:00 pm, the perpetrator had allowed water to be handed over to the hostages.

Before the release of the hostages Maksym Kryvosh apologized to them.

=== Negotiations ===
By 9:00 p.m. Volodymyr Zelenskyy spoke to the perpetrator by phone for about 10 minutes, after which the perpetrator released three hostages. Zelenskyy also fulfilled the perpetrator's demand by recording a video with the text in Russian: "The film Earthlings from 2005. Everyone should watch it". This video was removed later.

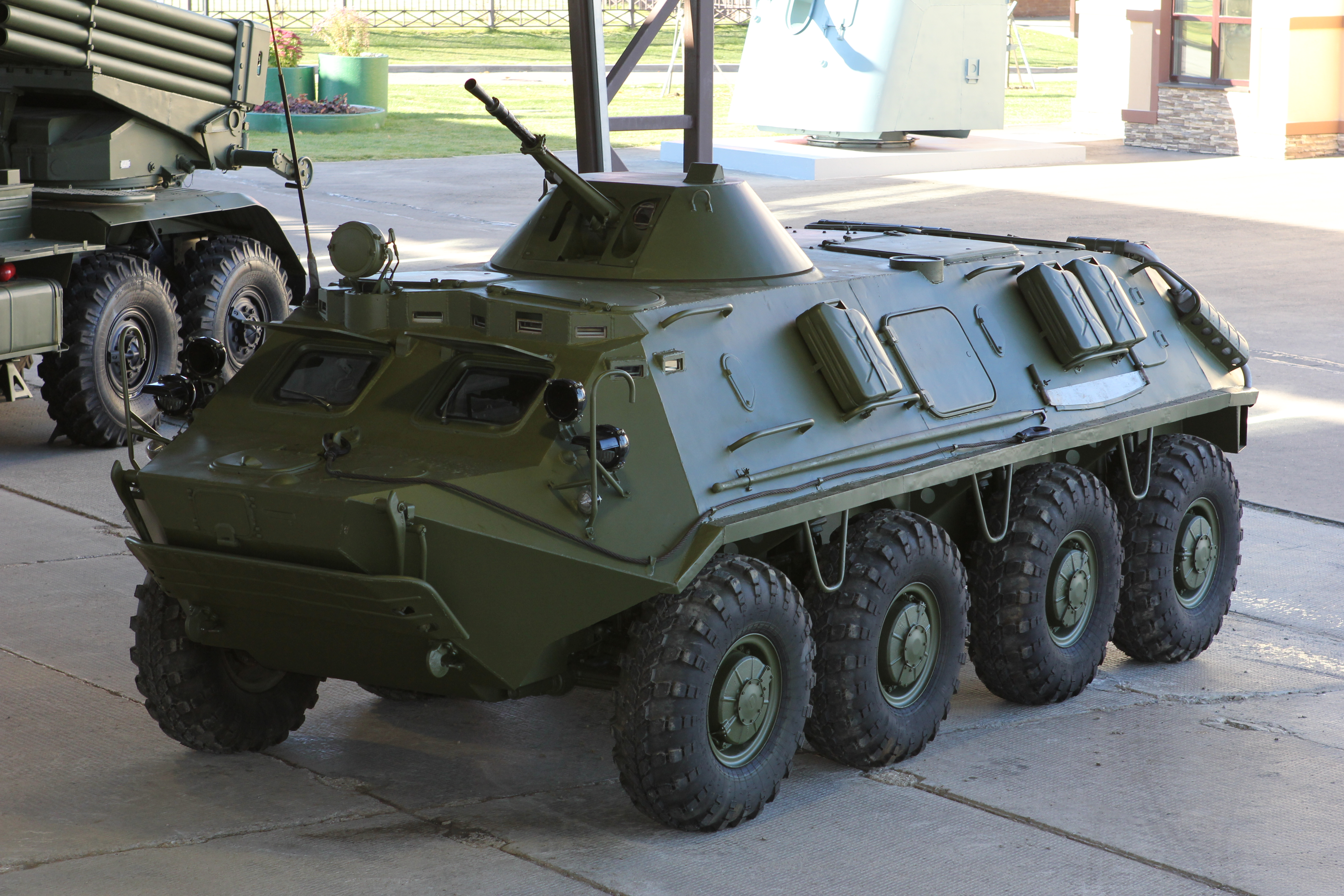
The National Guard of Ukraine BTR-60 participated in the hostage rescue operation

At approximately 9:46 pm, Kryvosh got off the bus with his arms outstretched and waited for about a minute before three people approached him and arrested him without resistance from Kryvosh. After that, the special forces advanced in an assault on the bus, using an armored personnel carrier and flash-noise grenades. All of hostages were freed during the police assault after hours of negotiations, and Kryvosh was arrested. All the hostages are said to be unharmed. Deputy of Interior Minister Anton Herashchenko explained that the assault was carried out because police didn't know whether Kryvosh would do anything else.

=== Immediate aftermath ===
Arsen Avakov reported that the accomplice of the perpetrator was arrested in Kharkiv.

On the night of 21–22 July, criminologists began to work at the crime scene.

The Guardian reports the following consequence:

Late on Tuesday [July 21], the Ukrainian interior minister, Arsen Avakov, said: “The film … is a good one. And you don’t have to be so screwed up and cause such a horror for the whole country – you can watch it without that.”

On 24 July, a court in Kharkiv took into custody a possible accomplice of Kryvosh, Dmytro Mykhaylenko. He was arrested for two months on bail of ₴175,000.

== Investigation ==
After the arrest of the perpetrator, he was charged under four articles of the Criminal Code: taking hostages, illegal handling of weapons, encroachment on the life of a law enforcement officer, and terrorist act. As the judge read out the 13-year sentence, Kryvosh threw a piece of soap at him.

=== Attacker ===
The attacker is Maksym Kryvosh, a 44-year-old man. He was born on 6 November 1975, in the city of Gay, Orenburg Oblast, Russian SFSR. His father, Stepan Kryvosh, an associate professor of the Polytechnic University, is an author of a patent for the manufacture of a collector of an electric machine and a method for hardening ring-shaped parts. His mother died in 2013 in a car accident. Maksym has a brother Bohdan, in 2005 a son was born to Maksym Kryvosh.

He was twice convicted for robbery, extortion and fraud. Initially, on 21 July, police reported that the attacker was receiving psychiatric treatment. Interior Minister Avakov denied this information.

In 2014, he published the Philosophy of the Criminal book in Russian in the VolynPoligraf publishing house, where he describes his stay in prison. The circulation of the book was 400 copies.

Kryvosh later stated that he had originally planned to seize the Orthodox Church of Ukraine Holy Trinity Cathedral in Lutsk.

== Reaction ==
=== Internal ===
==== Critics of the actions of special services and the authorities ====
The Security Service of Ukraine's actions during the incident were criticized for incompetence, in particular for allowing the terrorist to negotiate with President Zelenskyy.

=== Foreign ===
- Representatives of the US Embassy in Ukraine welcomed the release of the hostages.
- The authors of the Earthlings film reacted to the events in Lutsk and stated that they do not approve of terror.

== Aftermath ==
After the incident the National Police of Ukraine tightened security measures in 9 western oblasts of Ukraine (Vinnytsia, Zhytomyr, Zakarpattia, Ivano-Frankivsk, Lviv, Rivne, Ternopil, Khmelnytsky and Chernivtsi) and Kyiv.

== See also ==
- 2010 Manila bus hostage crisis
- 1995 San Diego tank rampage
- 2004 Bulldozer rampage police chase
