= DE1 =

Ukrainian series of DC electric locomotives

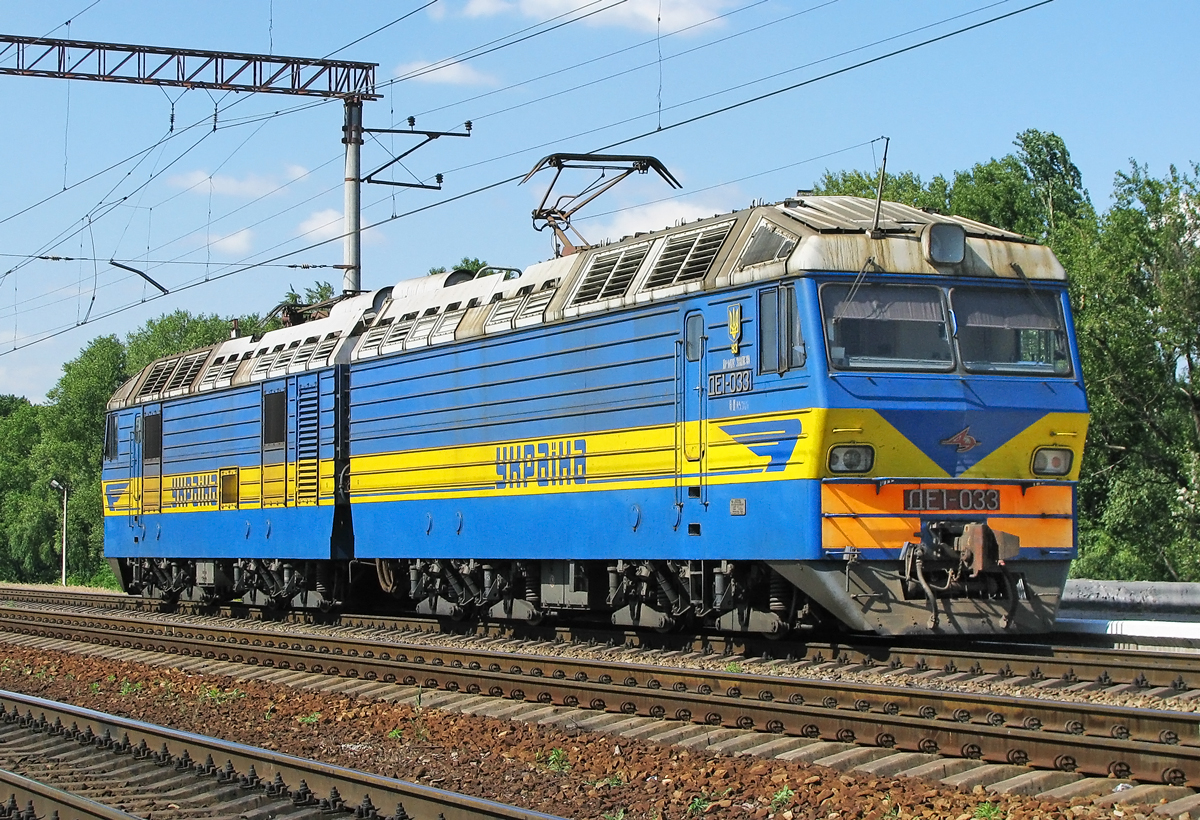
Type and origin
- Builder: Dnipropetrovsk research-and-production association for electric locomotive engineering
- Build date: 1995–2008
- Total produced: 40
Specifications
- Configuration
  - AAR: 2(2_{О} - 2_{О})
- Gauge: 1,520 mm (4 ft 11 27/32 in) Russian gauge
- Power supply: overhead line
Performance figures
- Maximum speed: 100 km/h (62 mph)

DE1 is a Ukrainian series of DC electric locomotives. It is the first electric locomotive developed by Ukraine since the end of the Soviet Union. The DE1 was produced for service in the Near-Dnieper and the Donets Basin regional divisions of the Ukrainian Railways. All of them were produced by the Dnipropetrovsk research-and-production association for electric locomotive engineering.

== History ==
By the middle of the 1990s there was a need to replace the ageing VL8 locomotives, which had stopped operating in Russia were only being used by that point on the Near-Dnieper and Donets territorial railways in southeastern Ukraine. The Dnipropetrovsk electric locomotive factory was tasked with developing a new electric locomotive.

The first two units produced, numbered DE1-001 (made in 1995) and DE1-002 (in 1997), became test prototypes that were used to further develop the design. They were both retired in 2007 and 2013, respectively. By 2008, a total of 40 units of the DE1 were produced.

== Technical specifications ==
The series was succeeded by the DS3 locomotives.

== Operators ==
Railroad	Qty.	Road Numbers	Notes
Ukrainian Railways	40	DE1-001–DE1-040	At least two of them may have been captured by the Donetsk People's Republic since the War in Donbas. The original two prototype units have been completely taken out of service, while several others appear to be currently out of order but still in service. All of them were based out of the Lyman or Dnipro depots. Their status since the Russian invasion of Ukraine is unknown.

== Gallery ==
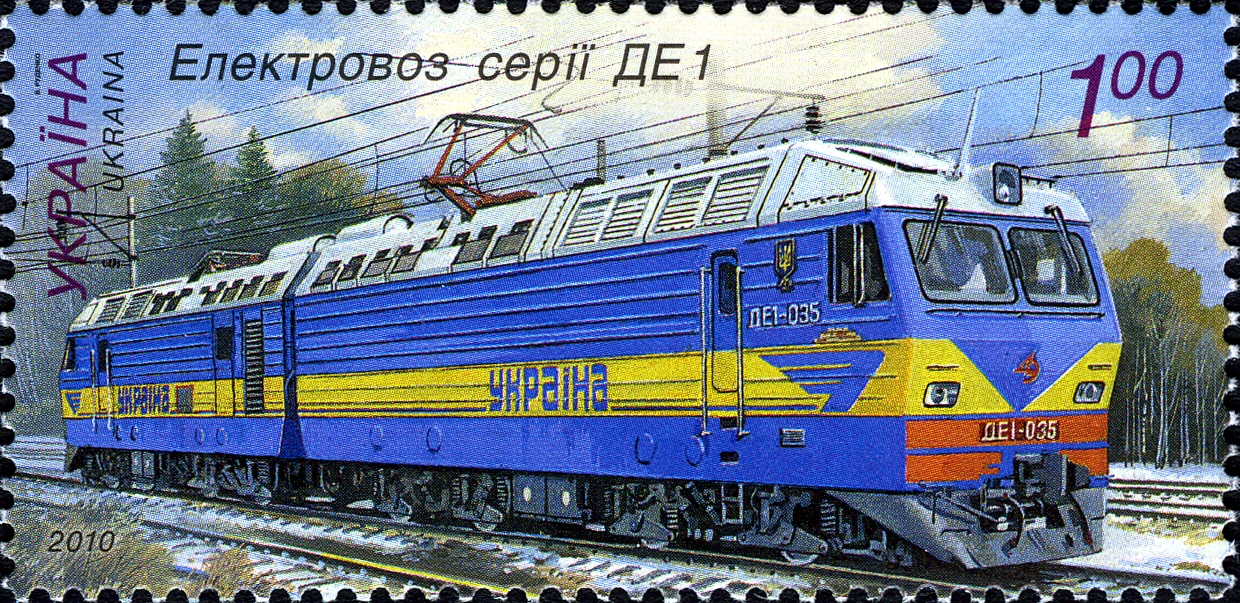
On a 2010 postage stamp.

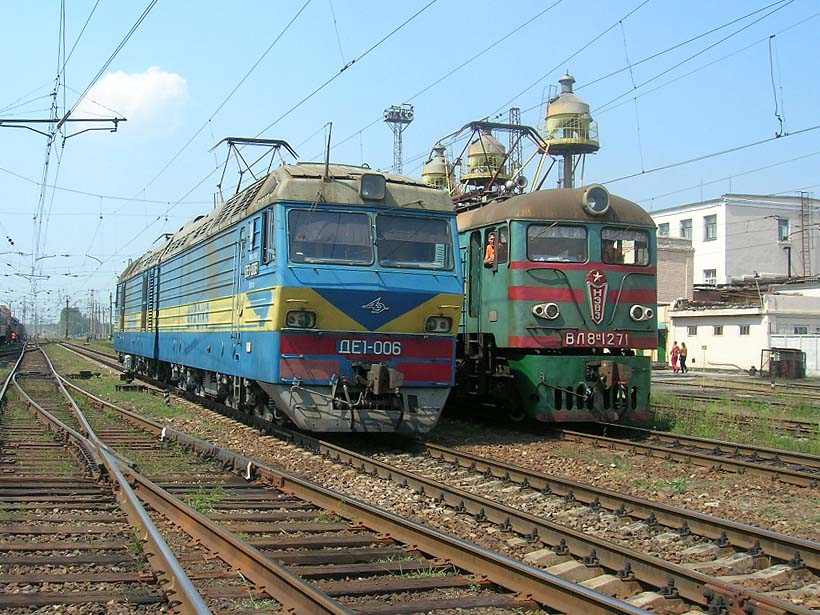
DE1-006 next to a Soviet era VL8.

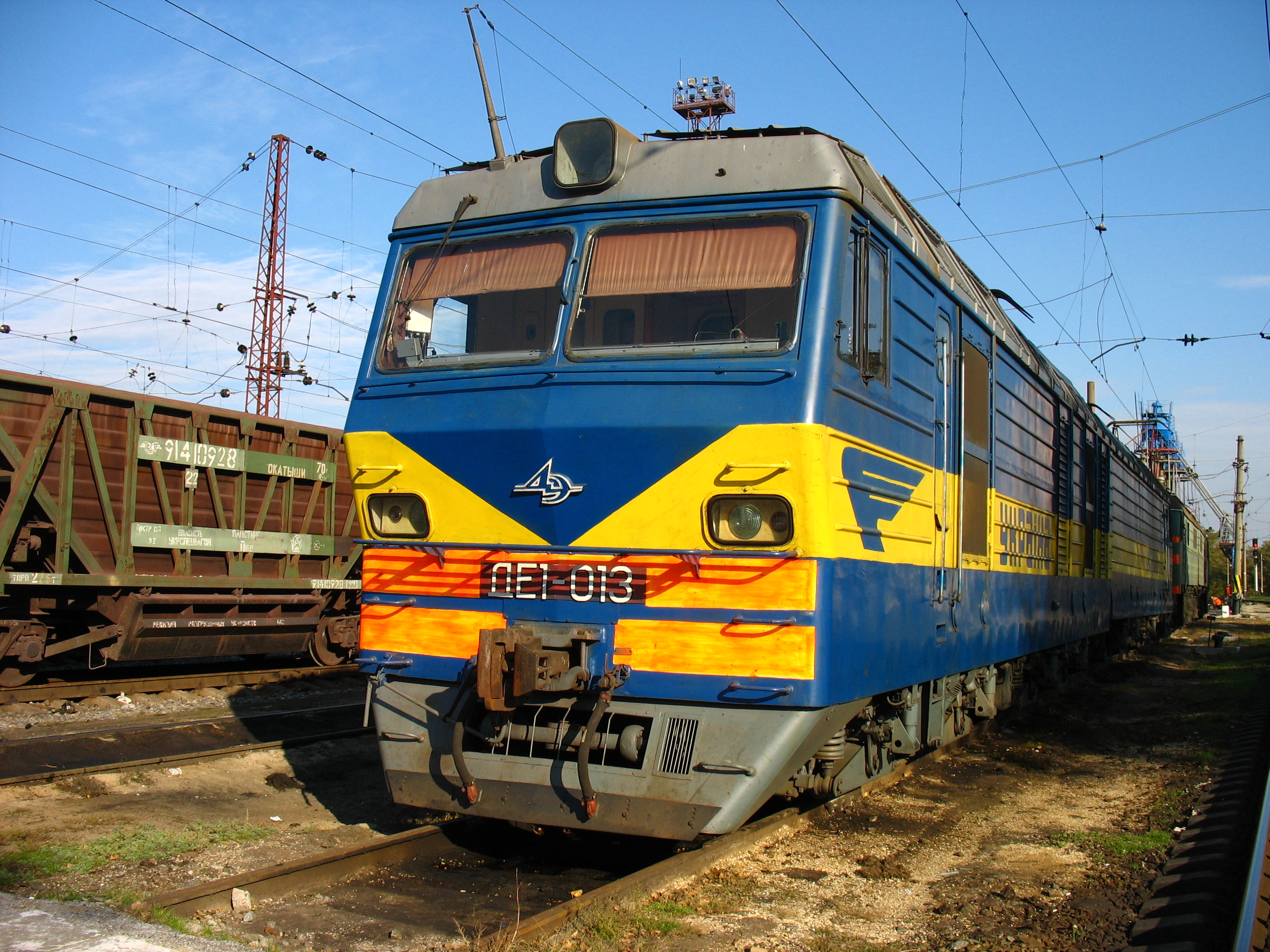
Locomotive cab up close.

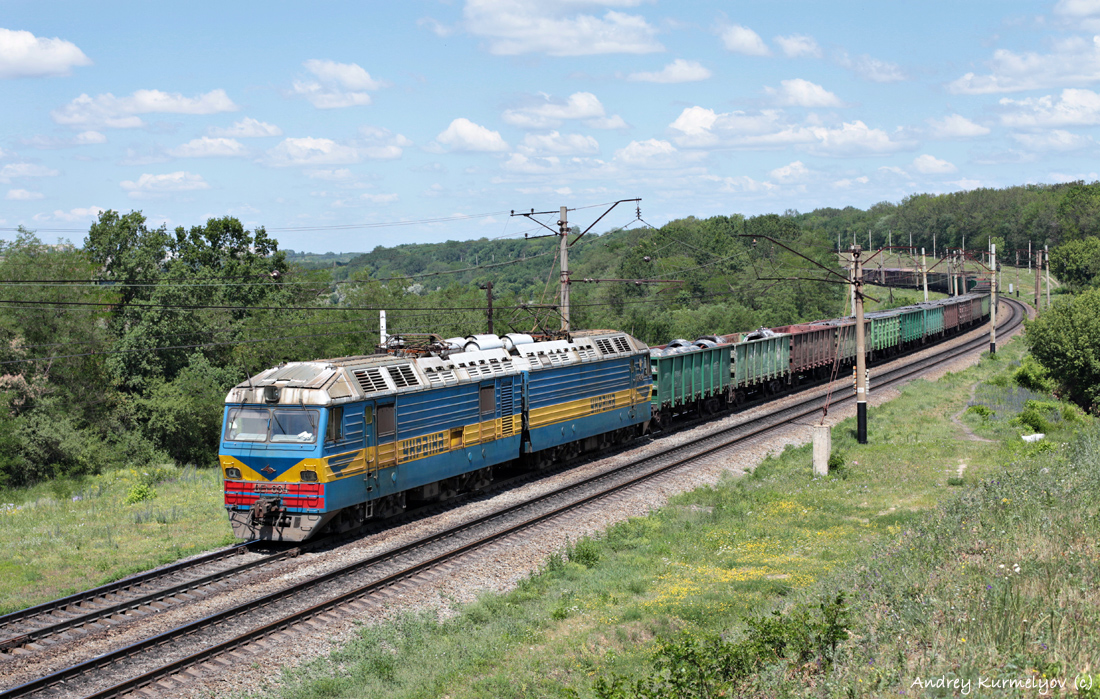
Pulling a freight train in Dnipropetrovsk Oblast.

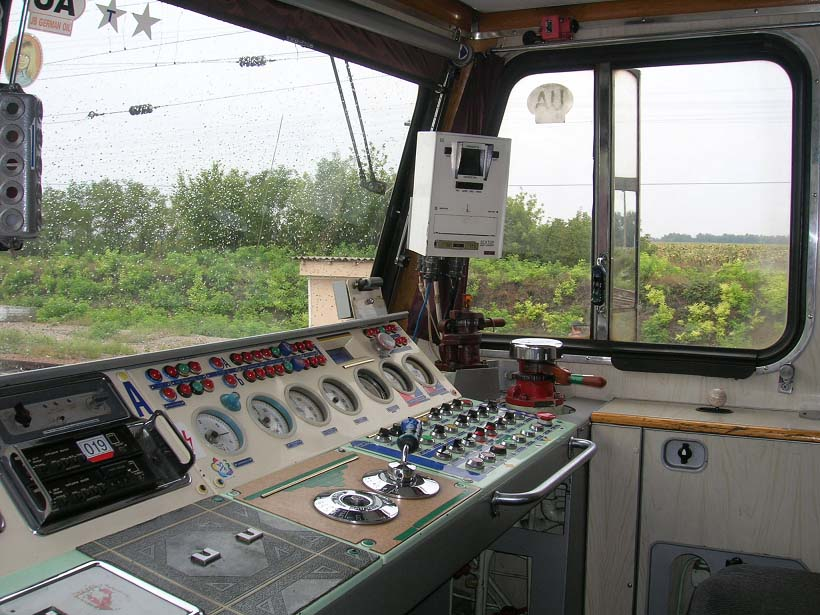
Inside a DE1 cab.
