= VL8 =

Class of 1723 Soviet electric locomotives

ВЛ8
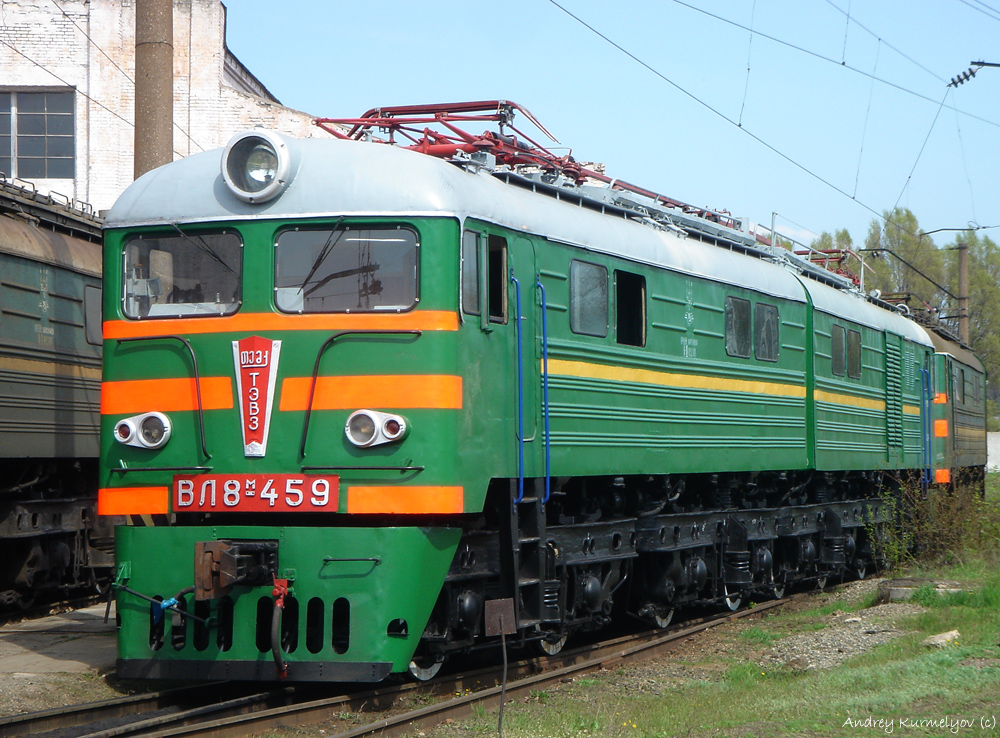
- VL8^{м}-459 in the suburbs of Dnipro
Type and origin
- Power type: Electric
- Builder: Soviet Union; Tbilisi Electric Locomotive Works, Novocherkassk Electric Locomotive Plant
- Build date: 1953, 1955–1967
- Total produced: 1,722 + 1 VL8^{v}
Specifications
- Configuration
  - AAR: B-B + B-B
  - UIC: Bo′Bo′+Bo′Bo′
- Gauge: 1,520 mm (4 ft 11 27/32 in) Russian gauge
- Wheel diameter: 1,200 mm (47.24 in)
- Length: 27,520 mm (90 ft 3 1/2 in)
- Width: 3,106 mm (10 ft 2 1/4 in)
- Height: 5,080 mm (16 ft 8 in)
- Loco weight: 180 tonnes (180 long tons; 200 short tons)
- Electric system/s: 3 kV DC Catenary
- Current pickup: Pantograph
- Traction motors: 8×TED НБ-406А
- Loco brake: Regenerative
Performance figures
- Maximum speed: VL8: 80 km/h (50 mph); VL8^{м}: 100 km/h (62 mph)
Career
- Operators: РЖД (RZhD), УЗ (UZ), Azerbaijan Railways, Georgian Railway
- Locale: SUN Soviet Union; RUS Russia; Ukraine; Georgia; Azerbaijan

The VL8 (Russian: ВЛ8)is an electric two-unit mainline DC freight locomotive used in the Soviet Union, still operated today by the state-owned Russian rail company RZhD and Ukrainian Railways. The initials VL are those of Vladimir Lenin (Russian: Владимир Ленин), after whom the class is named.

== History ==
The VL8 series was built as a replacement for the aging VL22^{м} which, by 1953, no longer met Soviet rail requirements. The VL8s were manufactured at the Tbilisi Electric Locomotive Works (ТЭВЗ) between 1957–1967, as well as the Novocherkassk Electric Locomotive Plant.

== Gallery ==
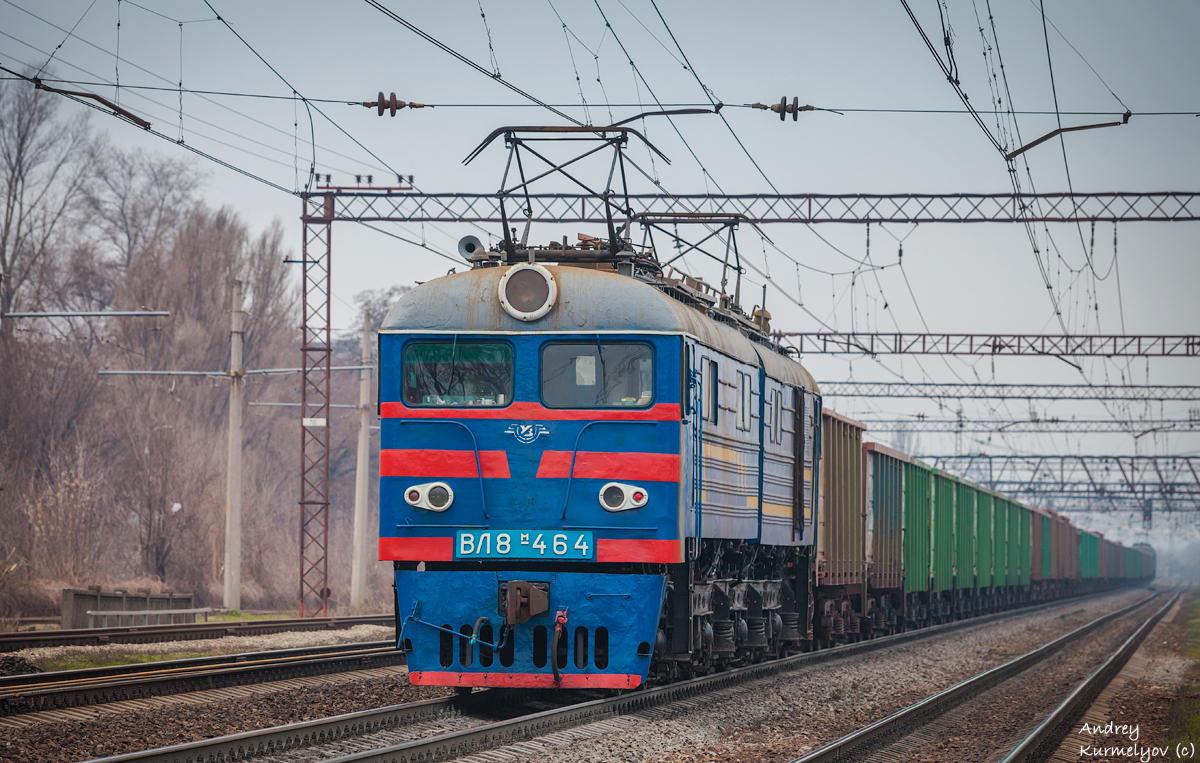
ВЛ8^{м}-464, Dnipro

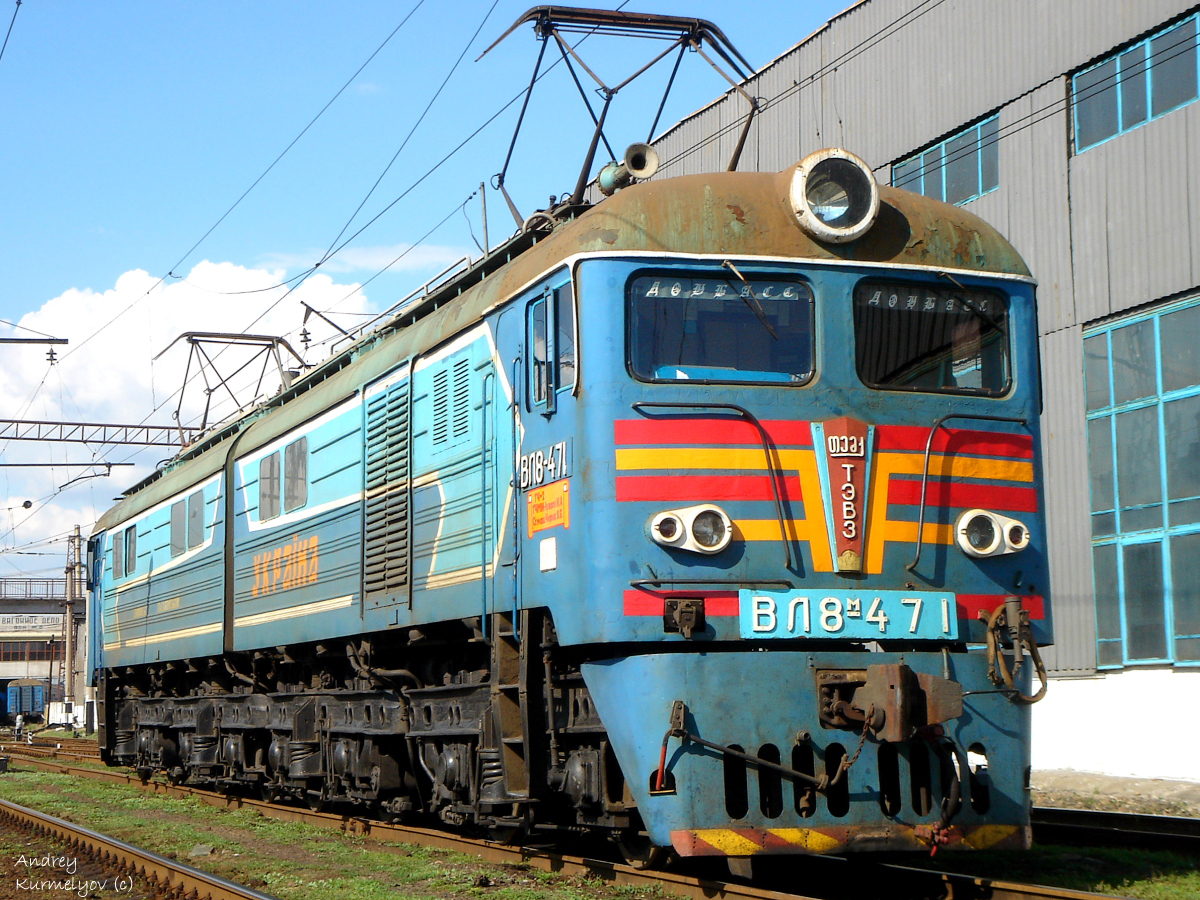
Электровоз ВЛ8^{м}-471, Debaltseve

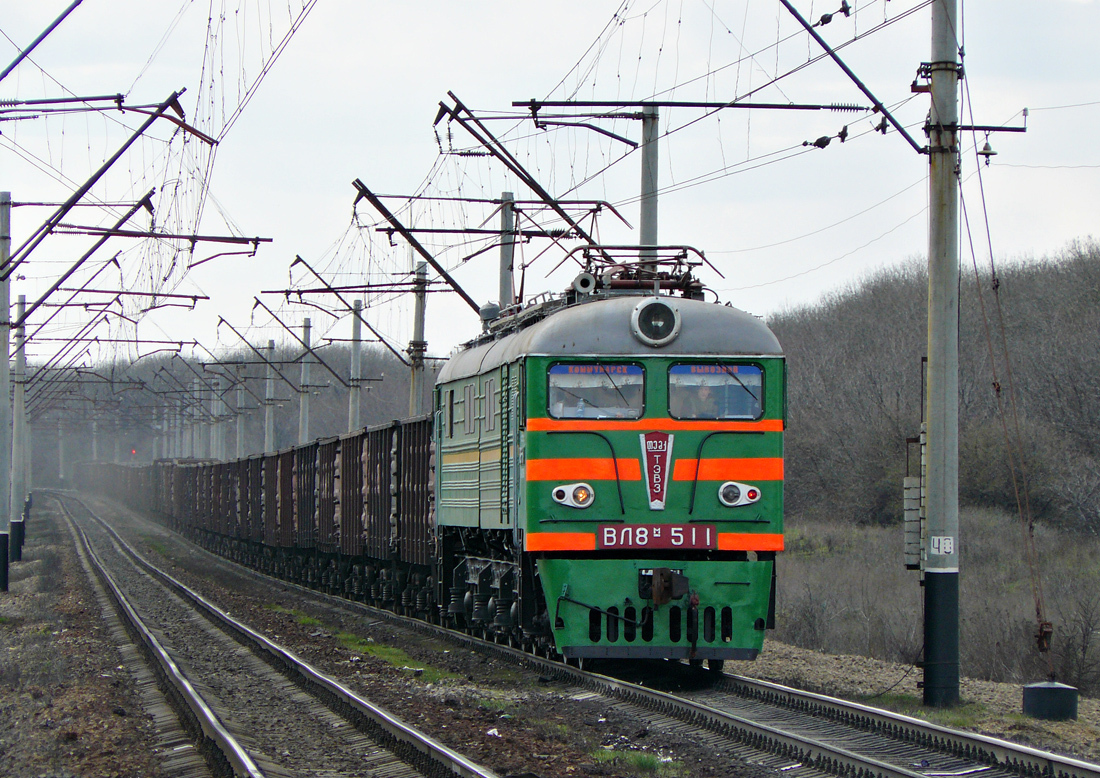
ВЛ8^{м}-511, Luhansk Oblast

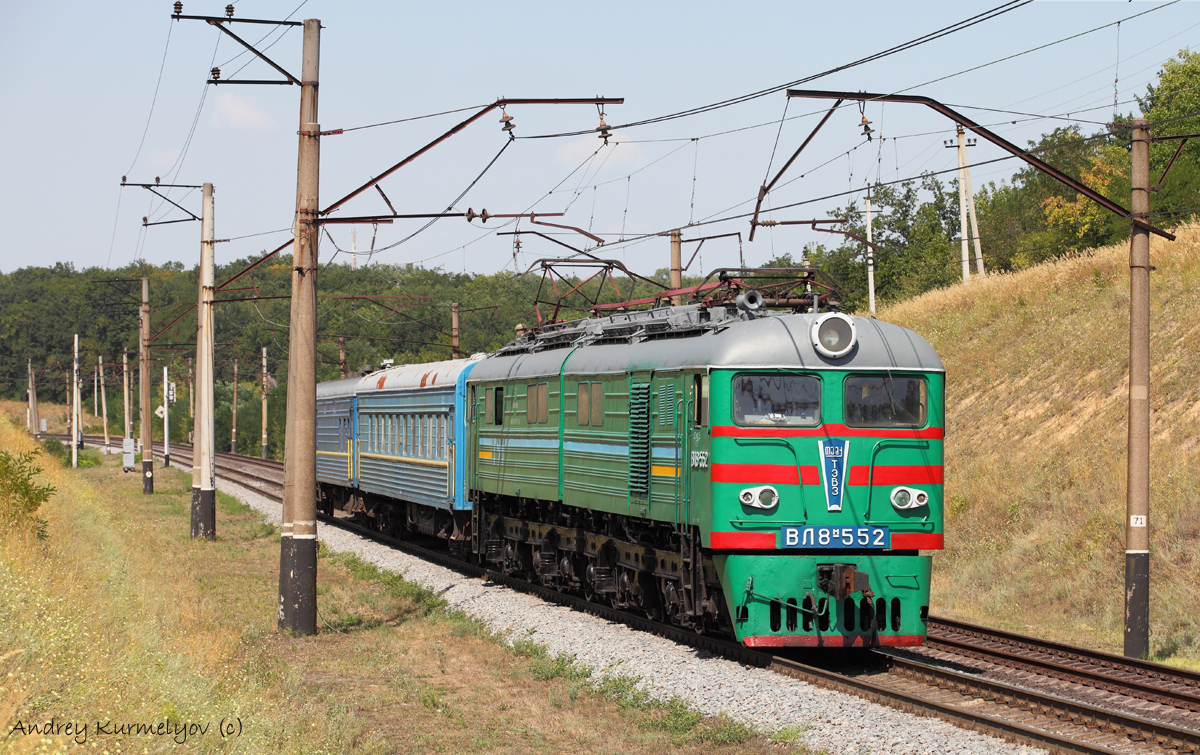
ВЛ8^{м}-552, Dnipro

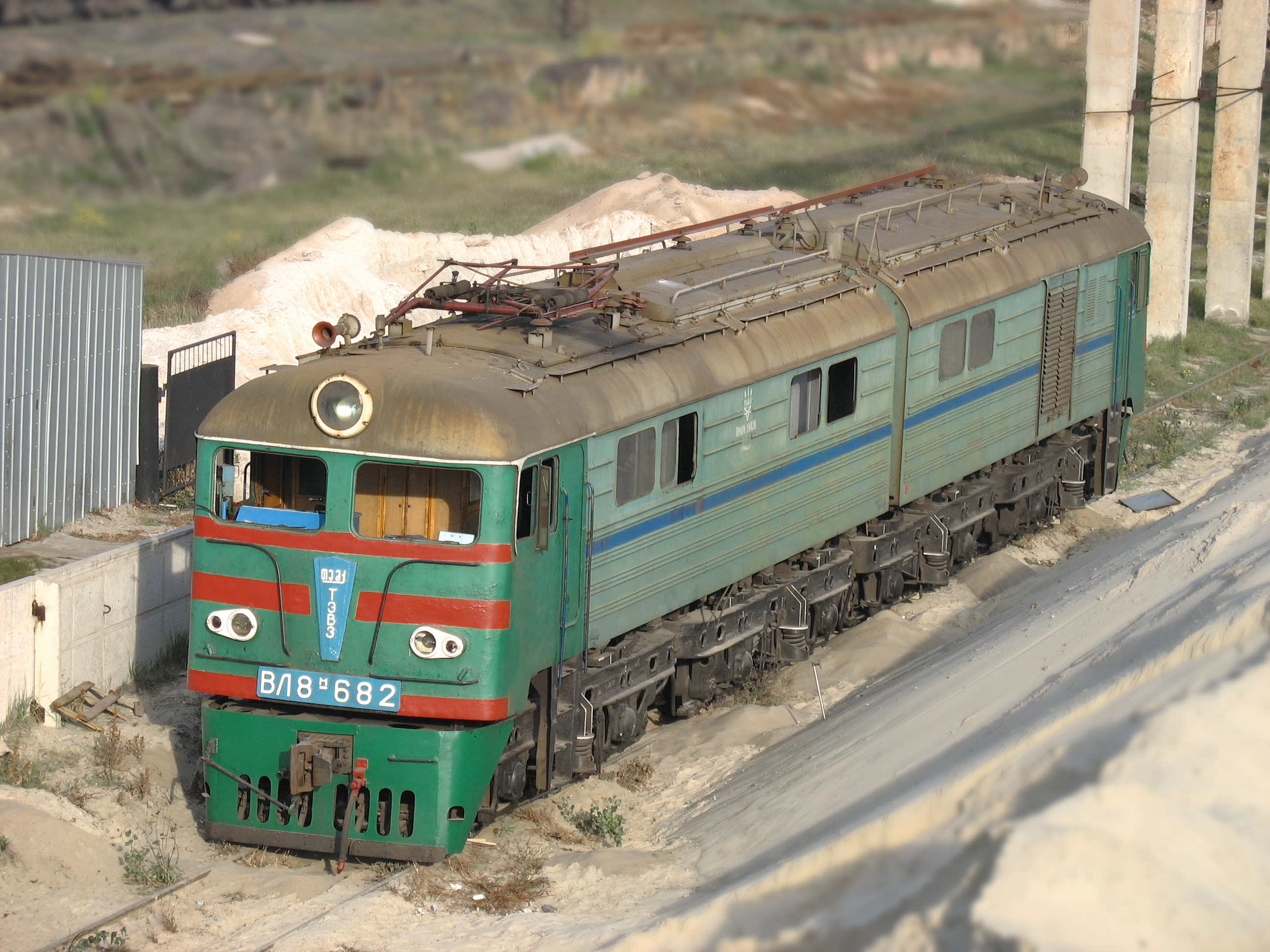
ВЛ8^{м}-682, Dnipro

ВЛ8^{м}-720 и ВЛ8^{м}-1622, Dnipro

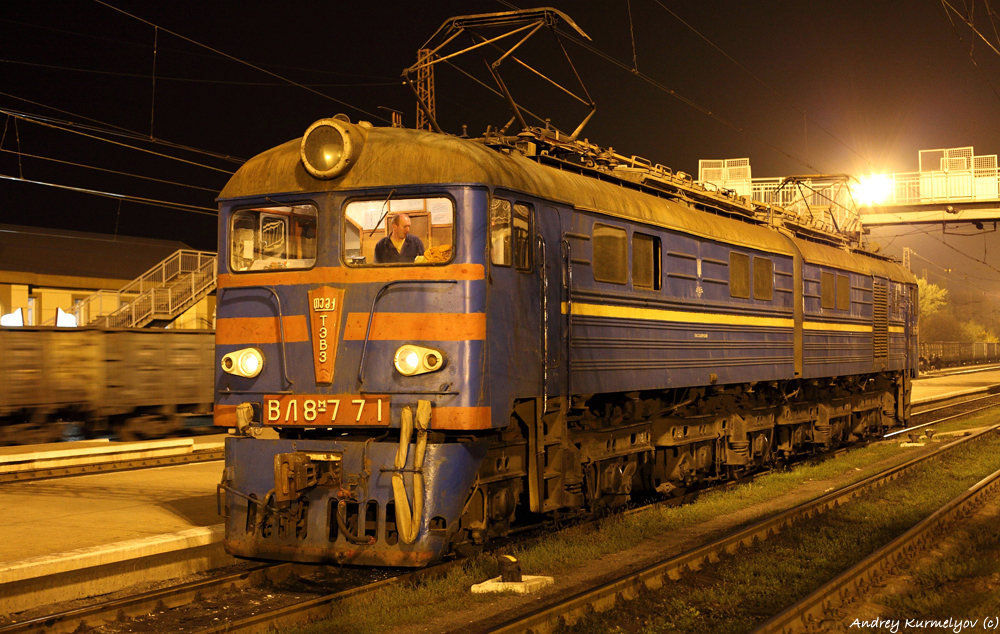
ВЛ8^{м}-771, Donetsk Oblast

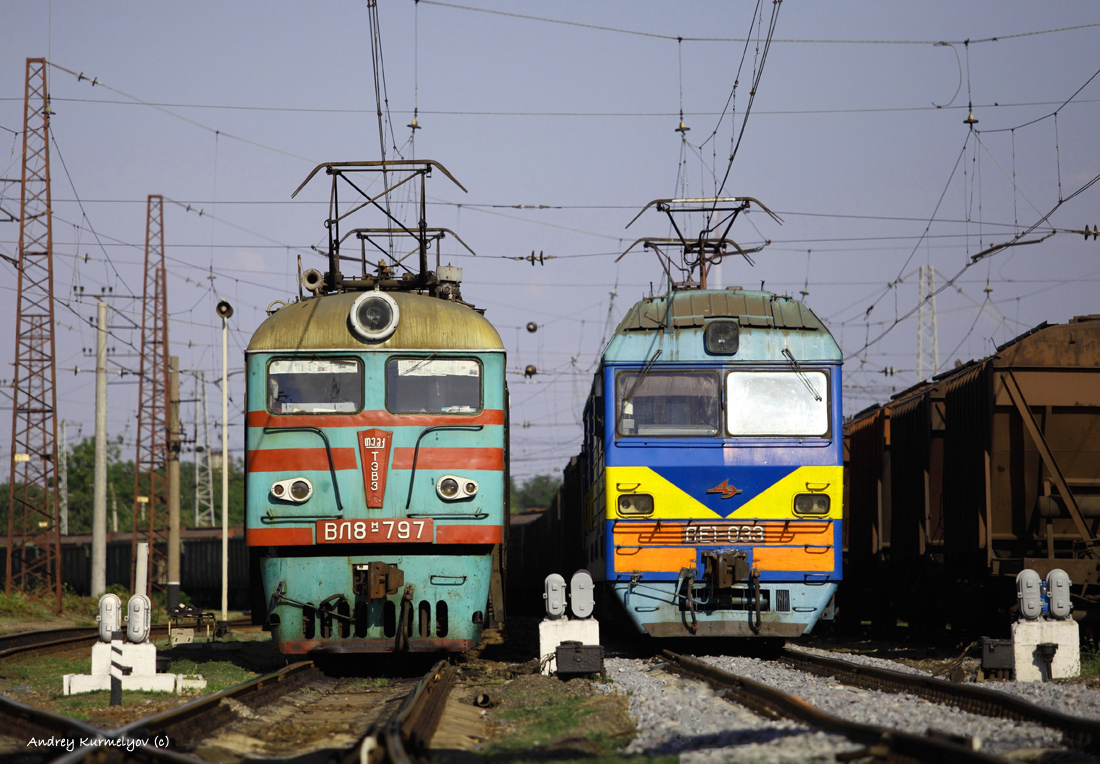
ВЛ8^{м}-797 and ДЭ1-033, Synelnykove

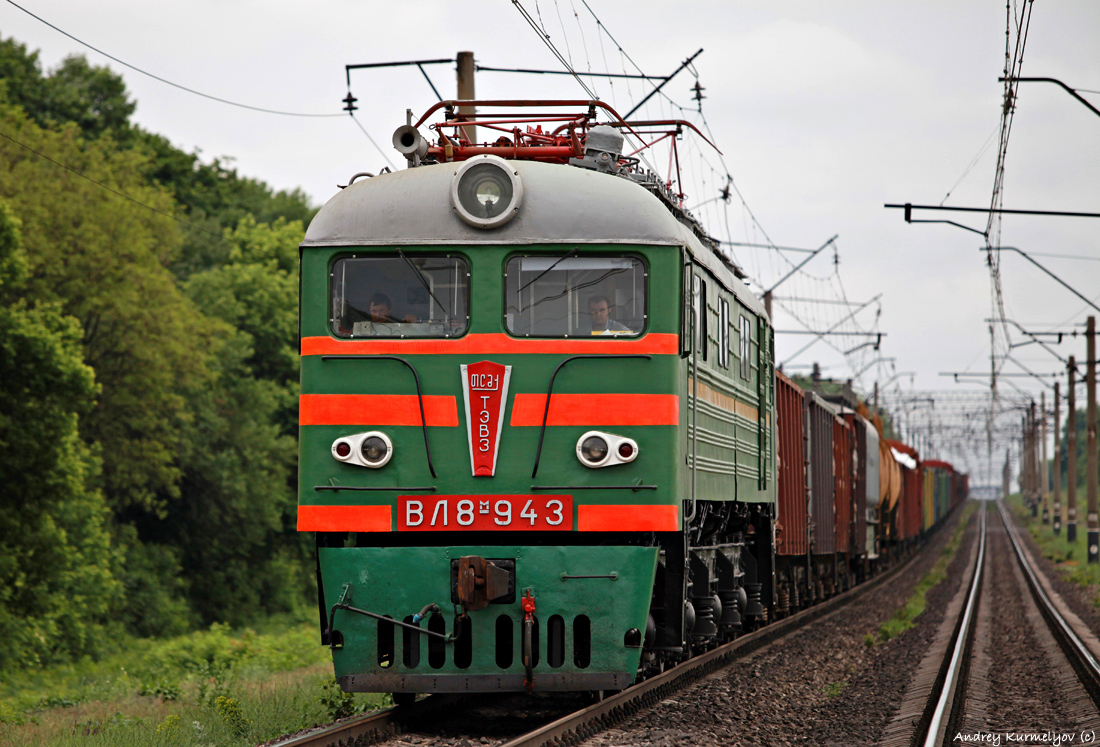
ВЛ8^{м}-943, Dnipropetrovsk Oblast

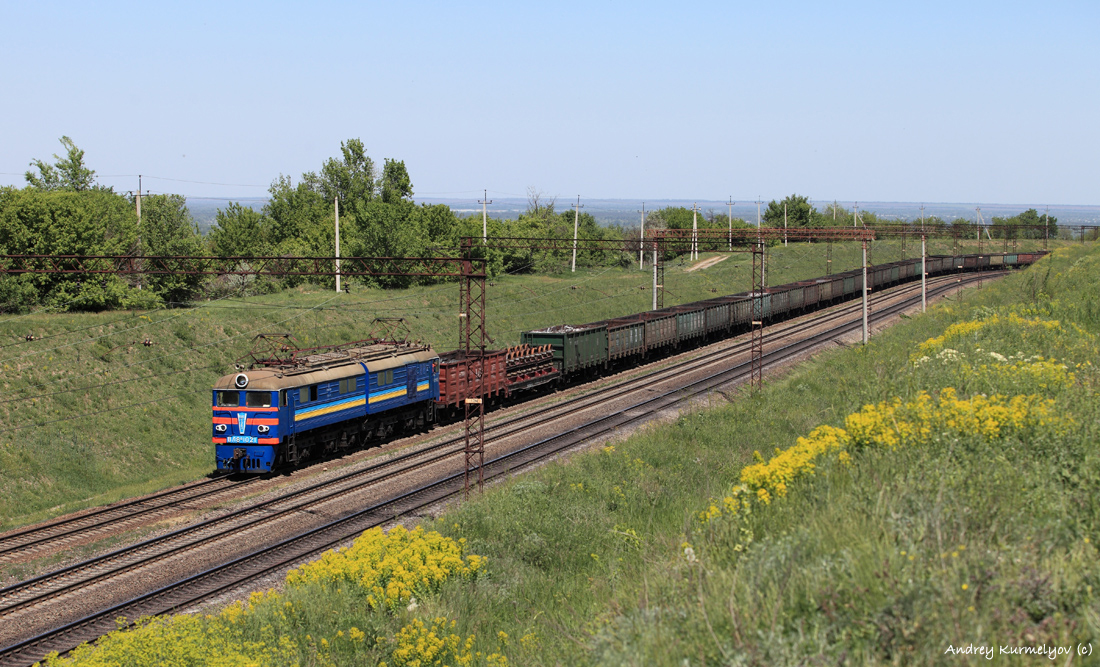
ВЛ8^{м}-1021, Dnipro

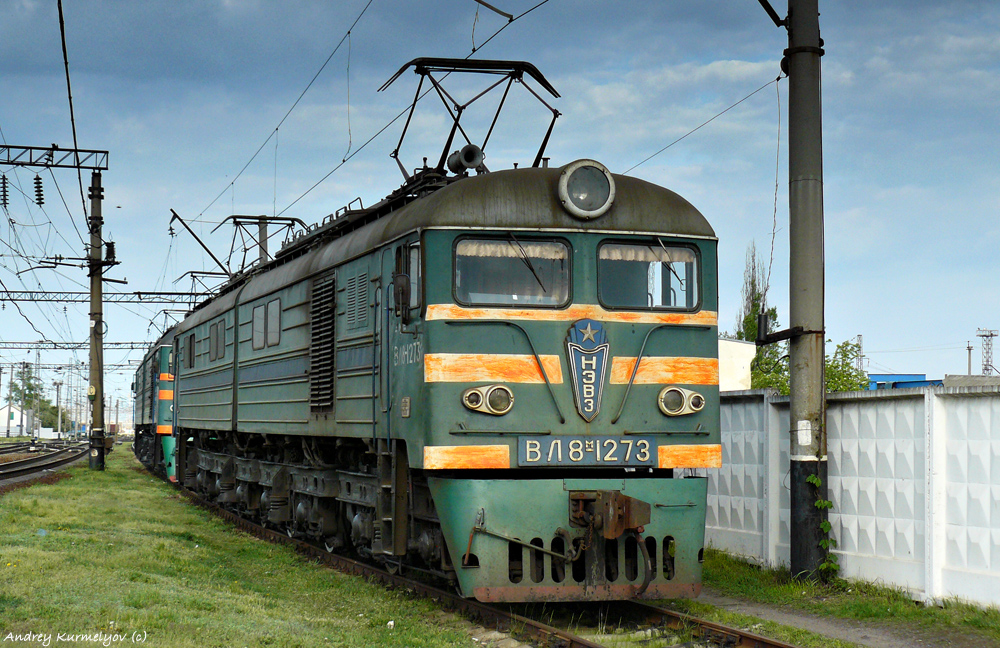
ВЛ8^{м}-1273, Piatykhatky, Dnipropetrovsk Oblast

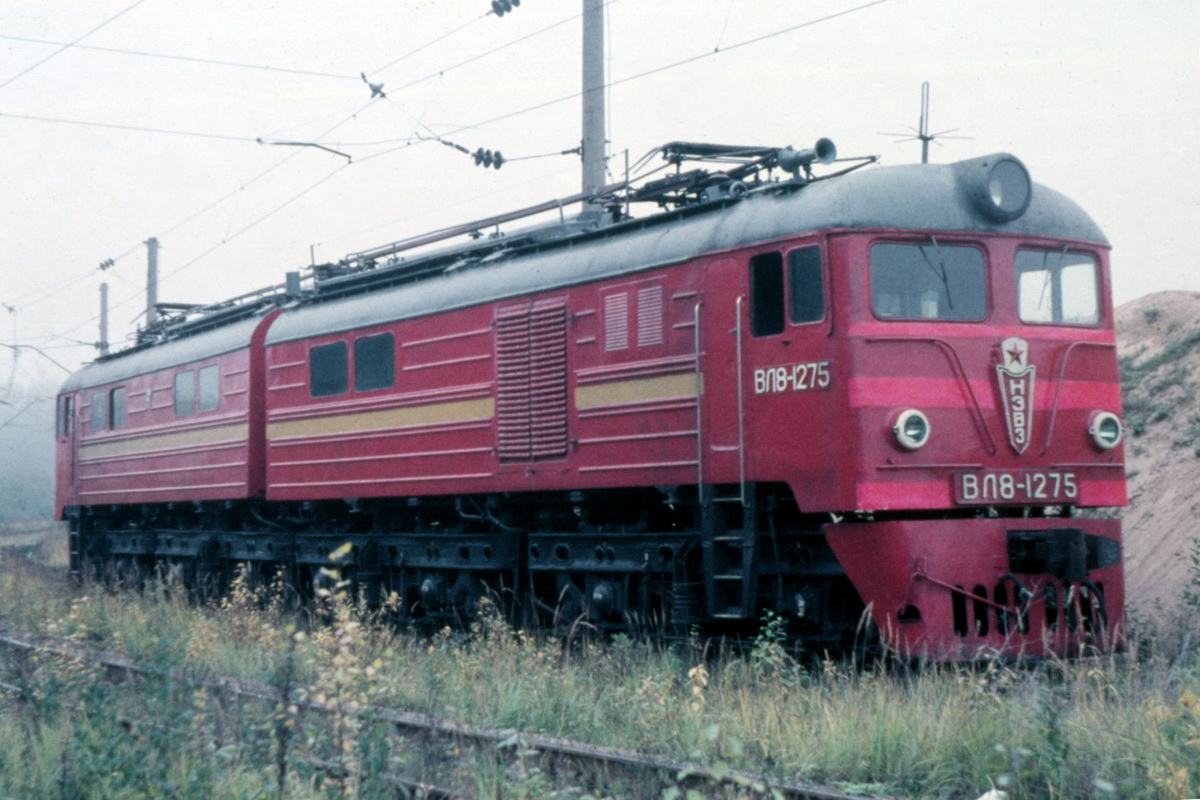
ВЛ8-1275, Sukhinichi (Russia)

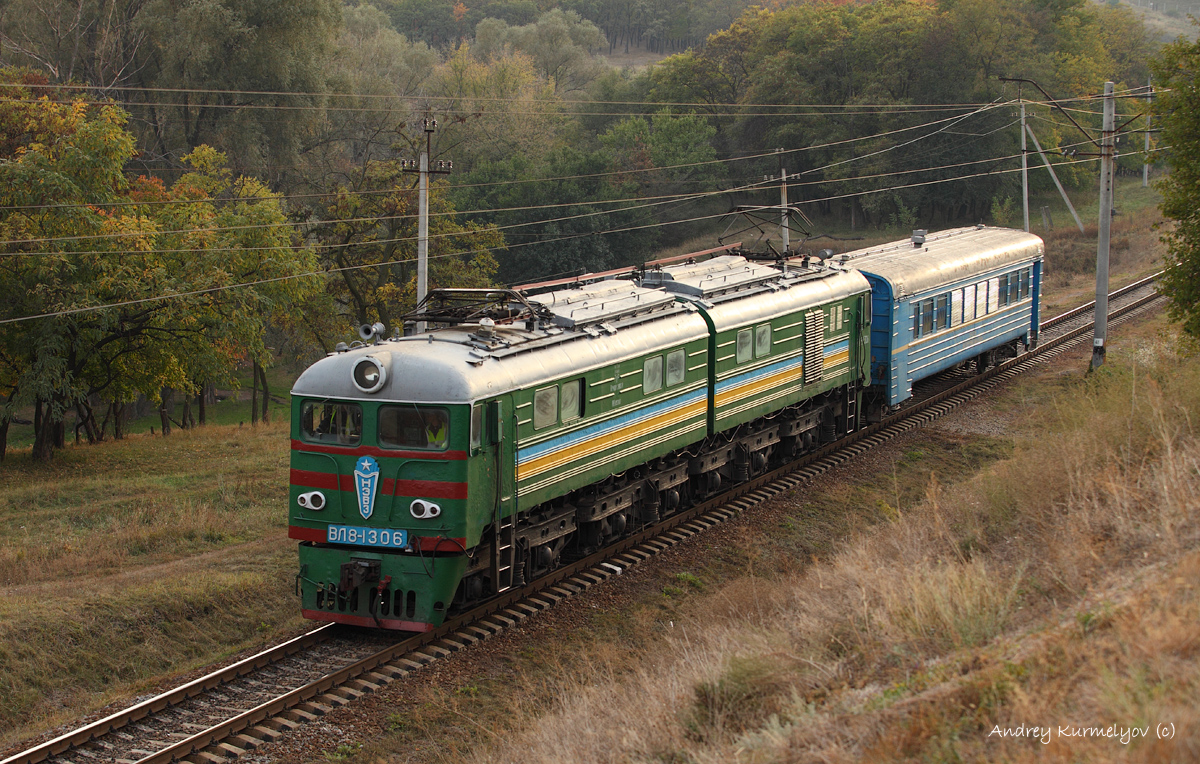
ВЛ8^{м}-1306, Dnipro

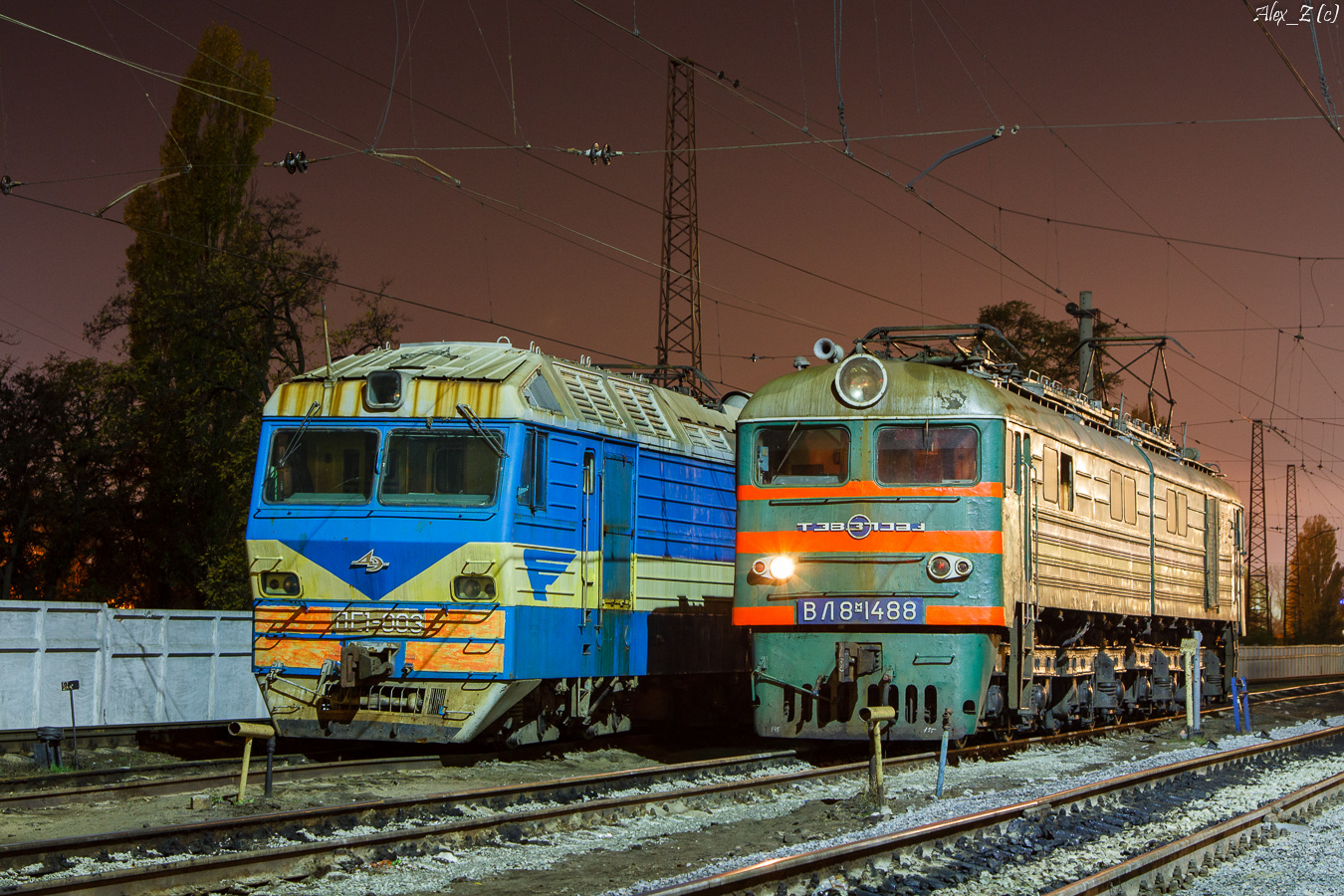
ВЛ8^{м}-1488 and ДЭ1-003, Dnipro

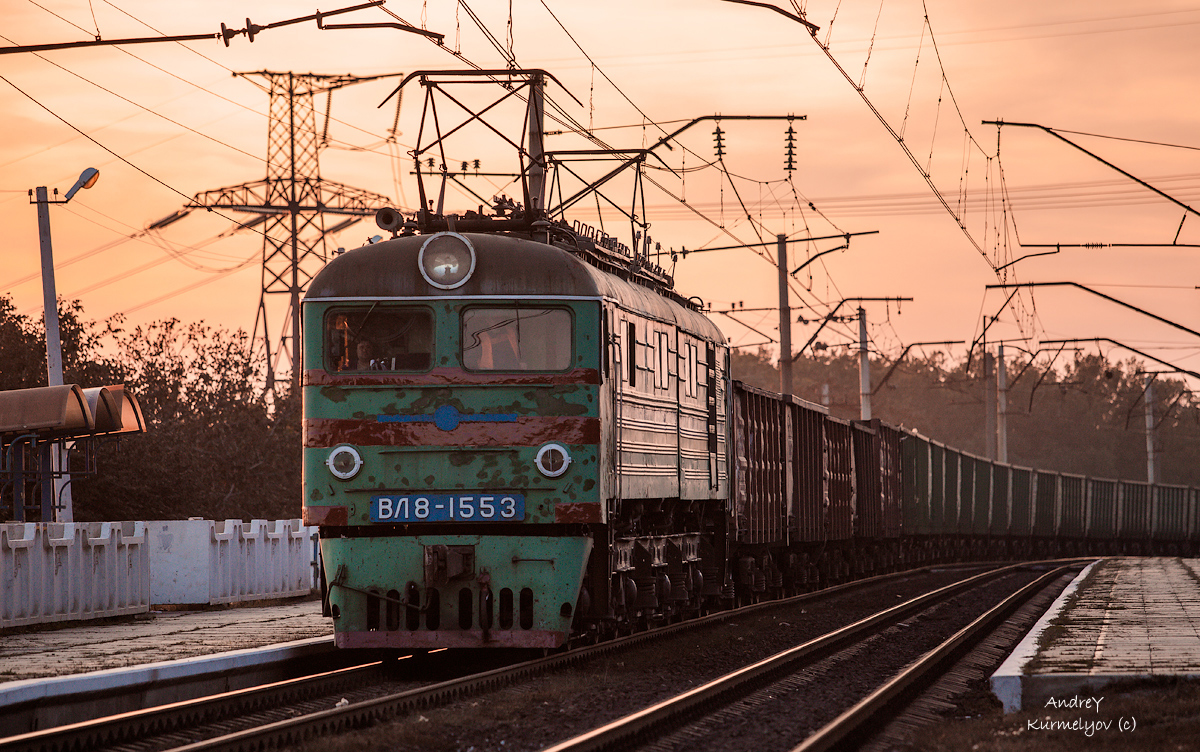
ВЛ8-1553, Dnipro

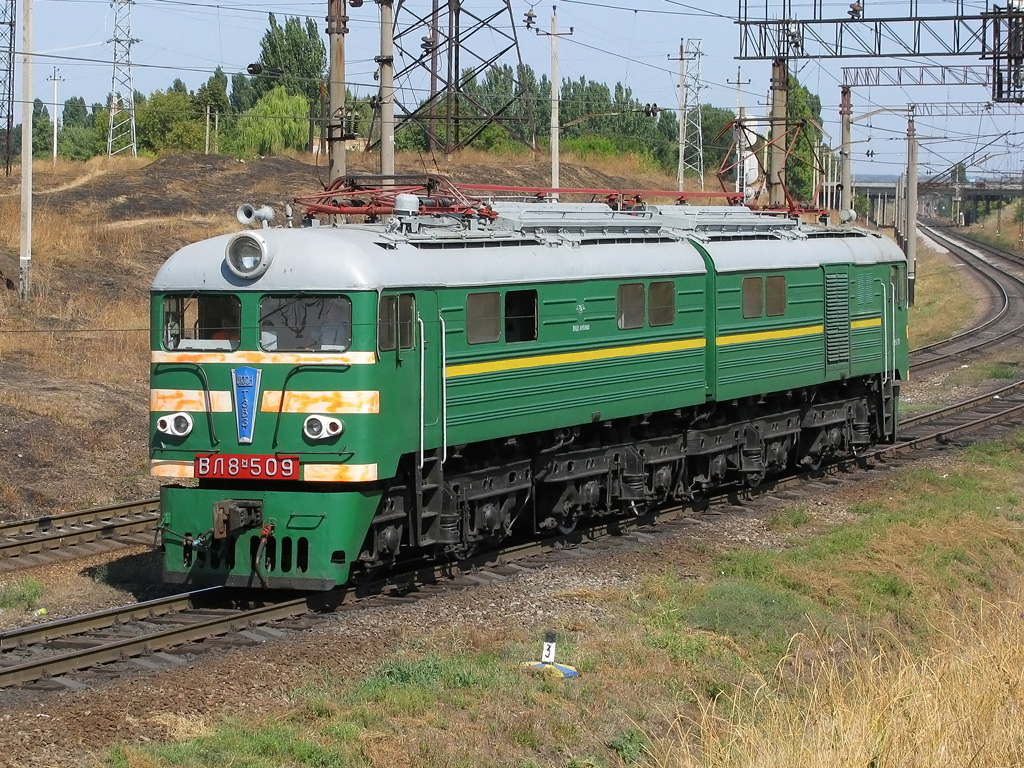

== See also ==
- Novocherkassk Electric Locomotive Plant
- Russian Railway Museum
- Museum of the Moscow Railway (Moscow Rizhsky station)
- History of rail transport in Russia
