= BAZ A079 =

BAZ A079 Etalon/Prolisok/Malva
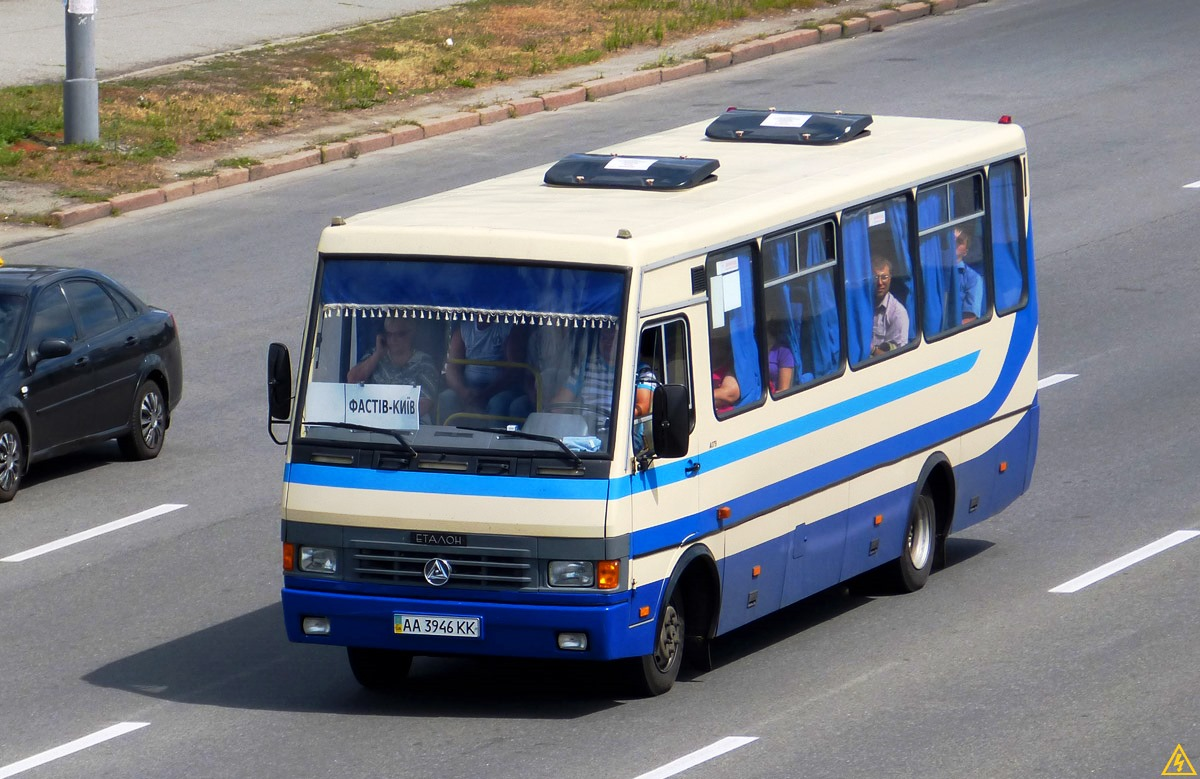
- BAZ A079 in Kyiv

Overview
- Manufacturer: Etalon
- Production: 2002-2015
- Assembly: Prolisky, Ukraine (BAZ); Chernihiv, Ukraine (ChAZ)
- Designer: UkrAutobusProm

Body and chassis
- Class: midibus
- Doors: 2
- Floor type: high-floor
- Chassis: Tata LPT 613
- Related: LAZ A073; ZAZ A07

Powertrain
- Engine: Tata 697; Tata 697 TC55; Tata 697 TC65

Dimensions
- Wheelbase: 3,800 mm (149.6 in)
- Length: 7,150 mm (281.5 in)
- Width: 2,260 mm (89.0 in)
- Height: 2,880 mm (113.4 in)
- Kerb weight: 4,750 kg (10,472 lb)

Chronology
- Successor: BAZ A081

BAZ A079 Etalon, known as Prolisok (Bluebell) or Malva (Mallow) in 2008–2015, is a Ukrainian high-floor midibus manufactured by Etalon at BAZ and ChAZ factories in Ukraine.

== History ==
In 2002 newly-formed Etalon Corporation ordered UkrAutobusProm institute to design a minibus heavily based on Tata LPT 613 chassis. The first prototype was assembled in Lviv the same year and presented at SIA-2002 summer exhibition in Kyiv. The first two buses were made in October at Boryspil Bus Factory opened earlier that month in Prolisky village near Kyiv.

In April 2003 Etalon assembled their 100th A079. At SIA-2003 the complany presented a school bus version of the bus with 29 seats to comply with the state school bus program. A tour bus version debuted at next year's SIA-2004.

At SIA-2005 the company unveiled an experimental three-axle BAZ A079.30 Etalon City and a deluxe coach BAZ A079.42 Etalon L. Neither of two went into production and while Etalon L worked in a non-regular transfer across southern Ukraine in 2006-2020 working for single company, Etalon City proceeded to switch several owners. At first worked in Sevastopol before being sold to Dubno in 2010, there it worked until 2018 when it was sold to Lutsk where it was abandoned.

In 2005 BAZ assembled their 1000th A079, it was a school bus sent to Novohrad-Volynskyi (now Zviahel) at July 25. In November the model began to be assembled at Chernihiv Bus Factory alongside the one in Prolisky due to high demand.

In 2006 A079 received a Euro-2 standard engine that caused minor changes to the driver's cabin and a new modification indexes. At SIA-2006 BAZ solemnly handed their 2000th A079 to its buyer.

In 2008 the model was update with another new engine, now complying with Euro-3 standards. September 26, 2008 Etalon held a new marketing strategy announcement event in Chernihiv, renaming all of their models after the flowers of Ukraine, the city version of A079 was named Prolisok (Bluebell) and the intercity version was named Malva (Mallow).

Ukrainian bus market was heavily affected by the 2008 financial crisis with sales plummeting instantly in September. In December both BAZ and ChAZ seized their assembly planning to renew it in February 2009 but the absence of demand pushed it back to April.

In 2009 Etalon designed a new A079 modification, A079.45. The model was adapted for transportation of disabled persons and was equipped with a PPA-150 wheelchair elevator and had a wider two-section rear door for it.

In 2010 BAZ A079 got Euro-4 engines. The same year in August Etalon assembled their 600th specialized bus, it was an A079 school bus delivered to Crimea.

Etalon's new Ashok Leyland-based A081 lineup introduced in 2009 was meant to eventually replace the aging A079, so with new models entering production in 2010 the company stopped udating the older models. Etalon's president Volodymyr Butko stated that A079 remains their most popular model as of 2013 and will stay in production as long as there is demand for it.

Eventually Tata's technology started growing outdated and Etalon decided to cease A079's production in 2015. The following year Ukraine outlawed any city public transport below Euro-5.

== Modifications ==
- BAZ A079.03, A079.13, A079.31 and A079.51 Etalon/Malva — intercity buses with one automatic door and one hand-opening door
- BAZ A079.04, A079.14, A079.32 and A079.52 Etalon/Prolisok — city buses with automatic doors
- BAZ A079.07, A079.17 and A079.27 Etalon/Malva — intercity buses with hand-opening doors
- BAZ A079.09, A079.19 and A079.29 Etalon/Malva — intercity buses with one automatic door and one hand-opening door
- BAZ A079.20, A079.23, A079.33 and A079.53 Etalon/Malva — longer intercity buses with hand-opening doors
- BAZ A079.21, A079.24, A079.34 and A079.54 Etalon/Malva — longer intercity buses with one automatic door and one hand-opening door
- BAZ A079.22, A079.25, A079.35 and A079.55 Etalon/Malva — deluxe intercity buses with one automatic door and one hand-opening door
- BAZ A079.45, A079.46 and A079.56 Prolisok — city buses with automatic doors and a wider rear entrance
- BAZ A079.48 Prolisok — city bus with automatic doors and a CNG engine
- BAZ A079.03Sh, A079.13Sh, A079.31Sh and A079.51Sh Etalon/Malva — school buses with one automatic door and one hand-opening door
- BAZ A079.21Sh, A079.24Sh, A079.34Sh and A079.54Sh Etalon/Malva — longer school buses with one automatic door and one hand-opening door
- BAZ A079.45Sh, A079.46Sh and A079.56Sh Prolisok — school buses with automatic doors and a wider rear entance
- BAZ A079.24S Etalon/Malva — police bus with one automatic door and one hand-opening door
- BAZ A079.30 Etalon City — three-axel city bus with automatic doors
- BAZ A079.42 Etalon L — deluxe intercity bus with hand-opening doors
- BAZ A079Sht Shtabnyi — factory staff bus

== Gallery ==
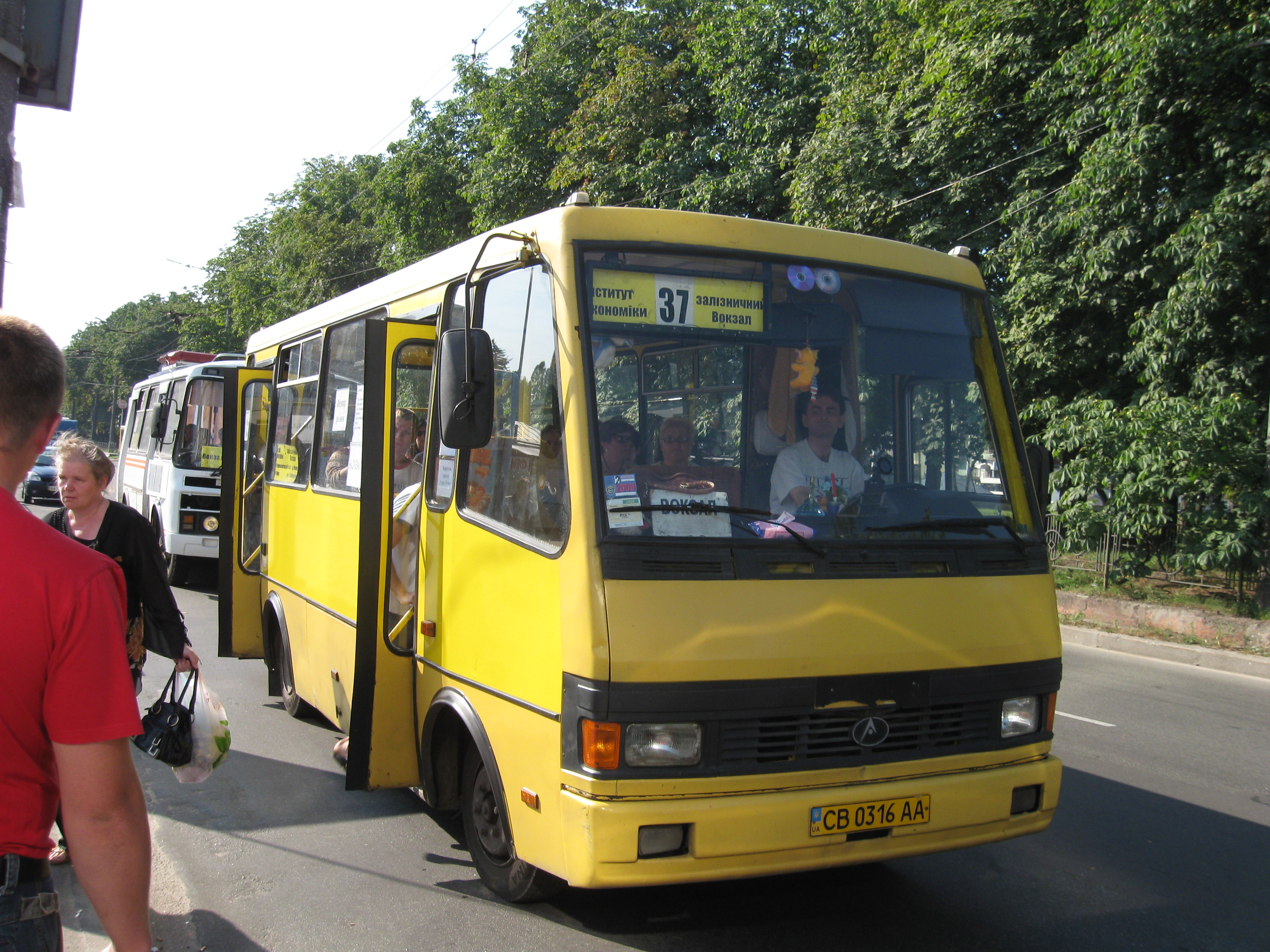
BAZ A079 Prolisok in Chernihiv

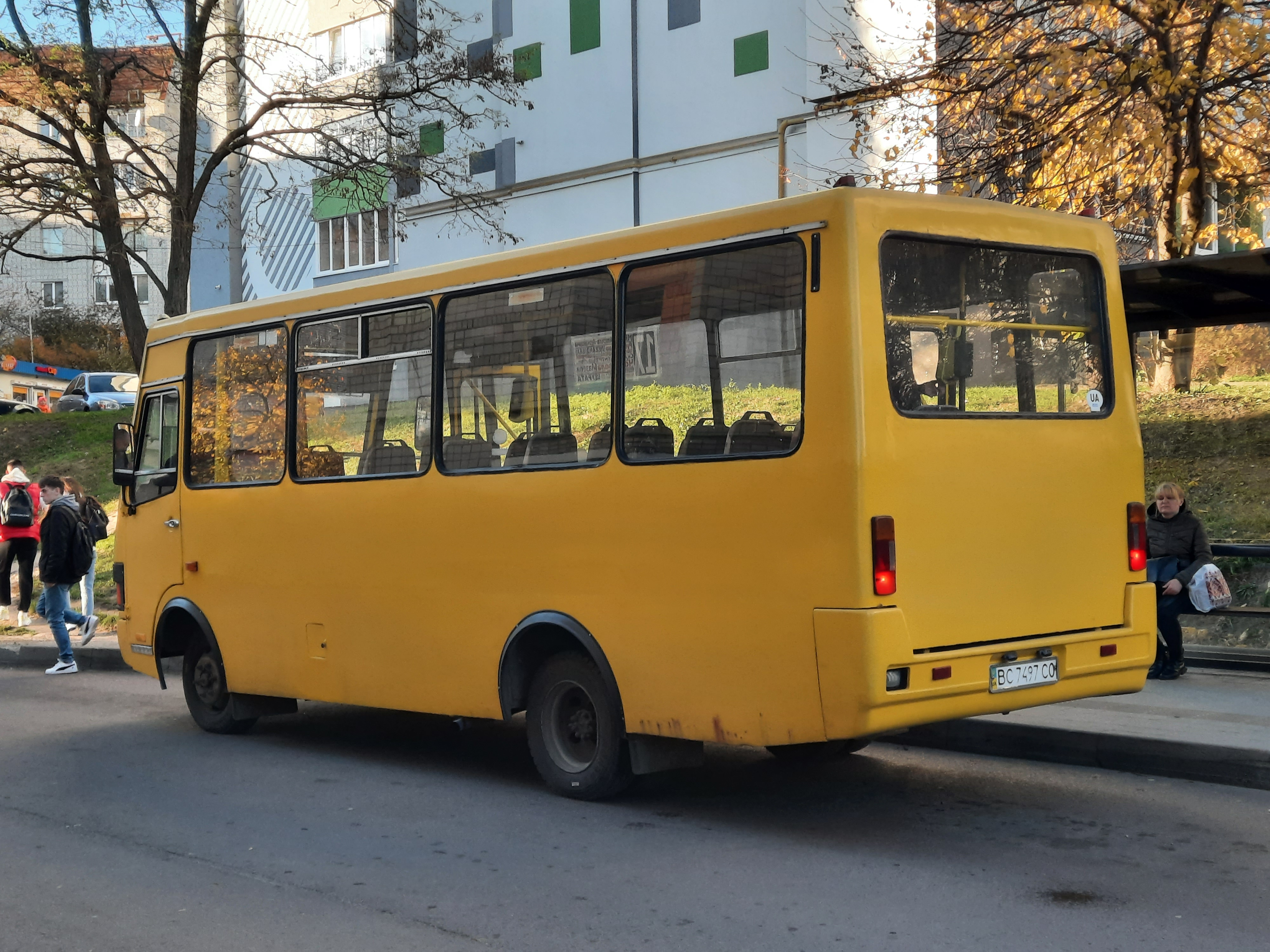
BAZ A079 Prolisok in Lviv

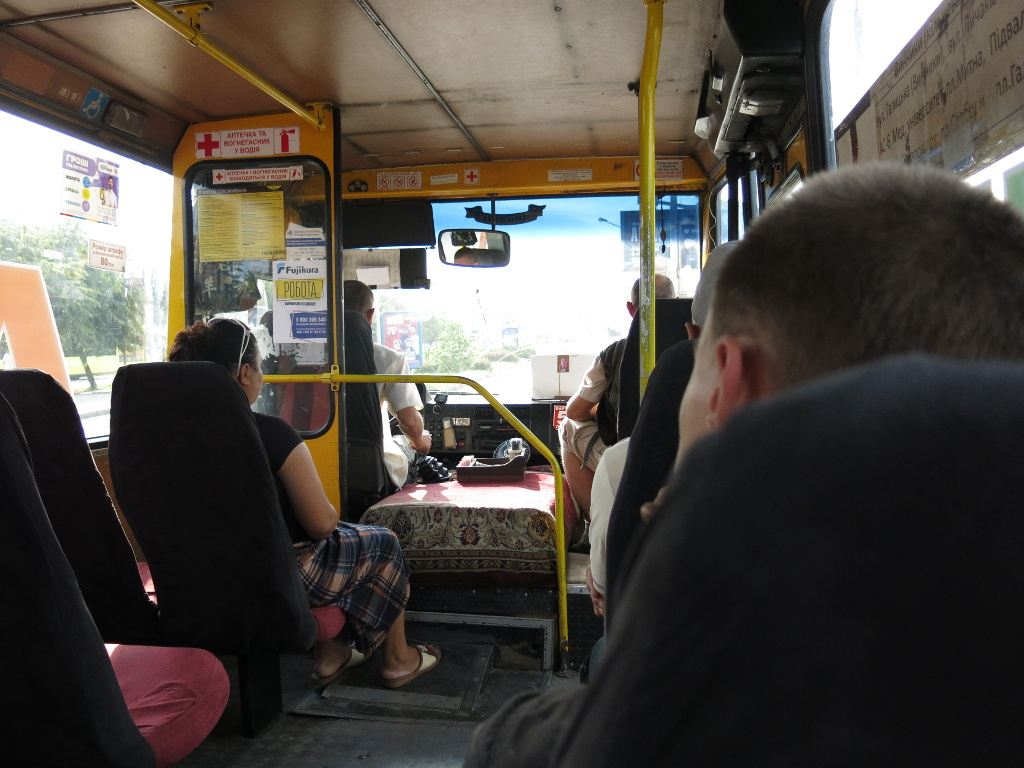
BAZ A079 Prolisok interior

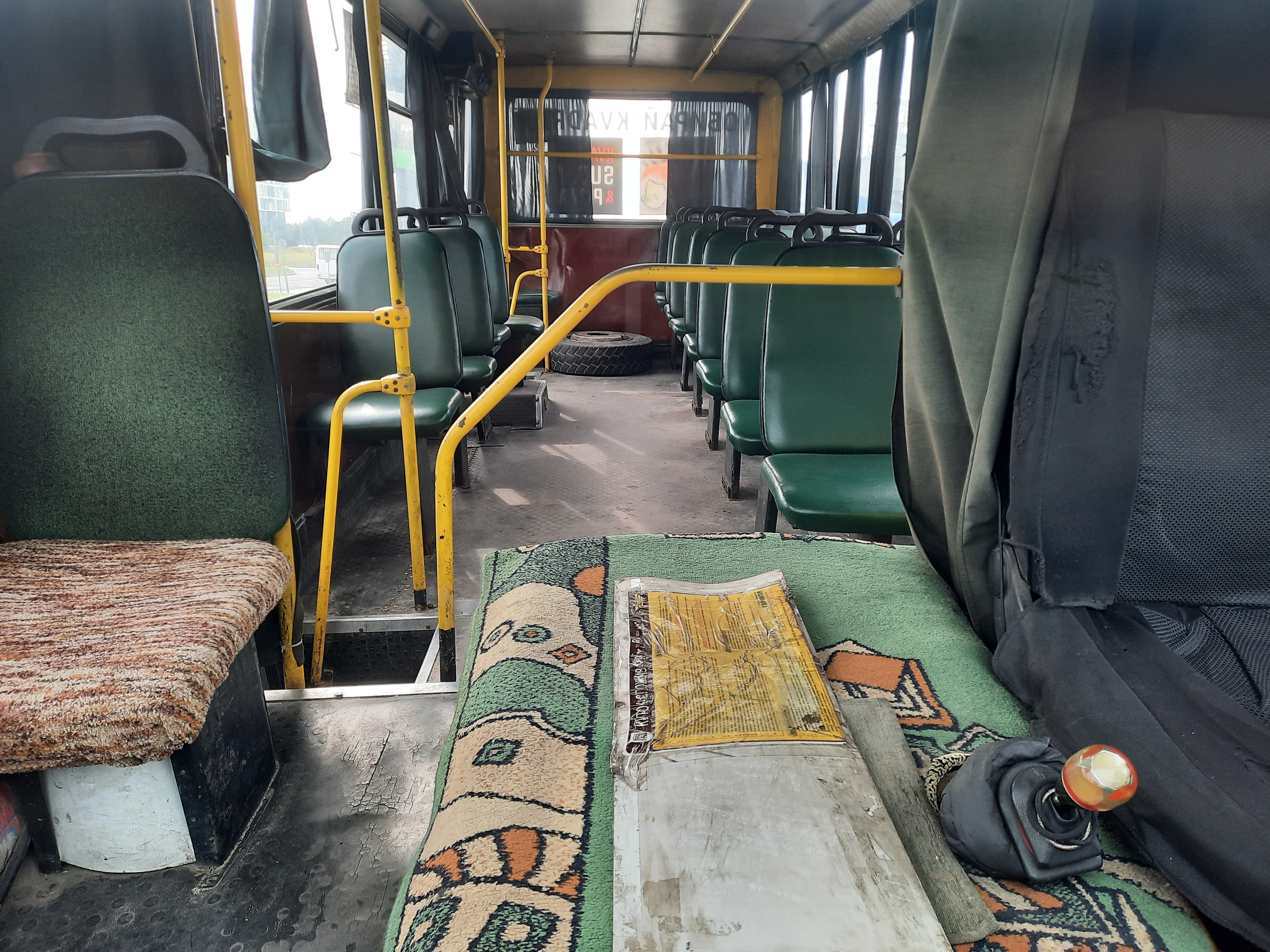
BAZ A079 Prolisok interior

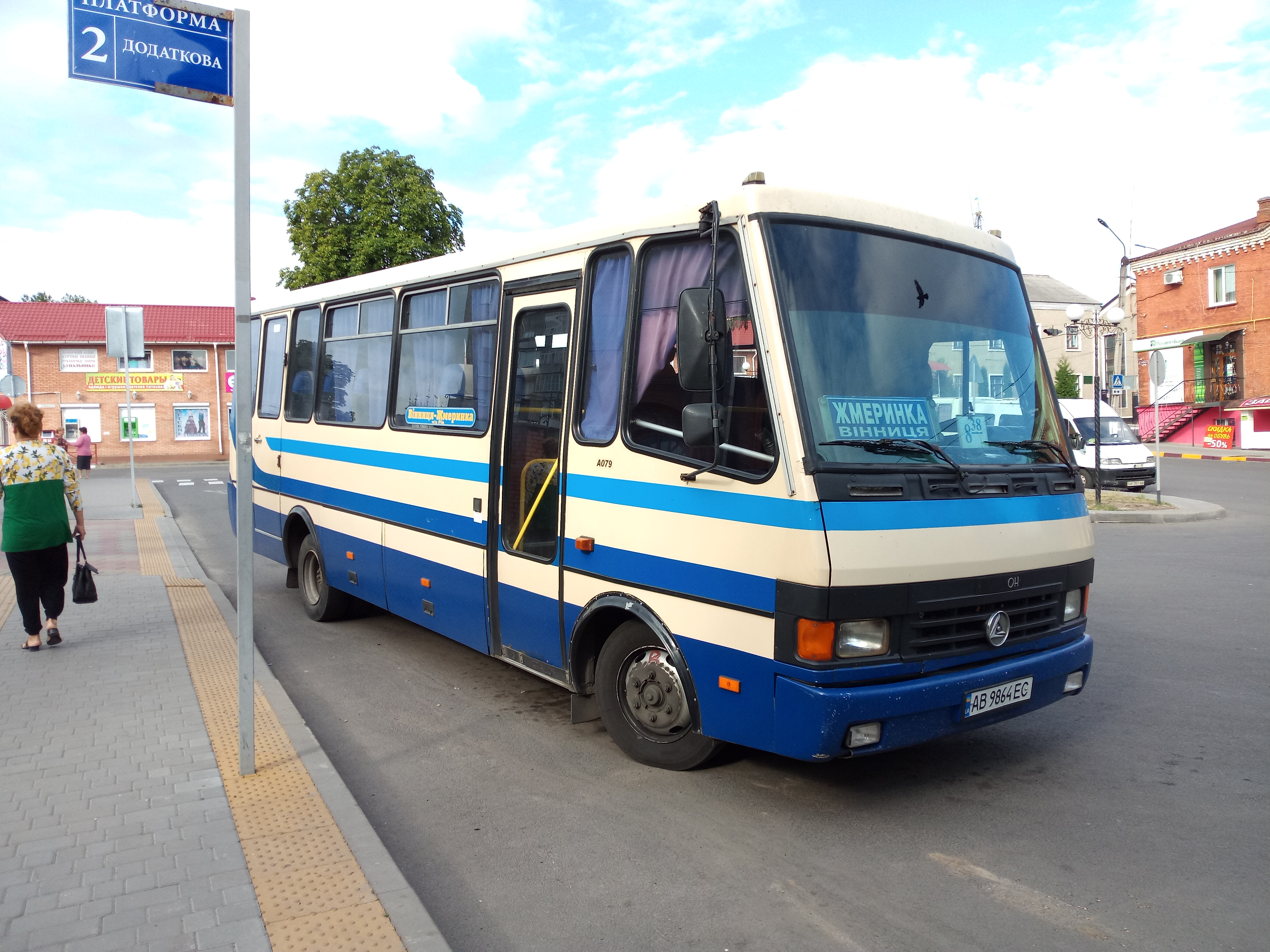
BAZ A079 Malva in Zhmerynka

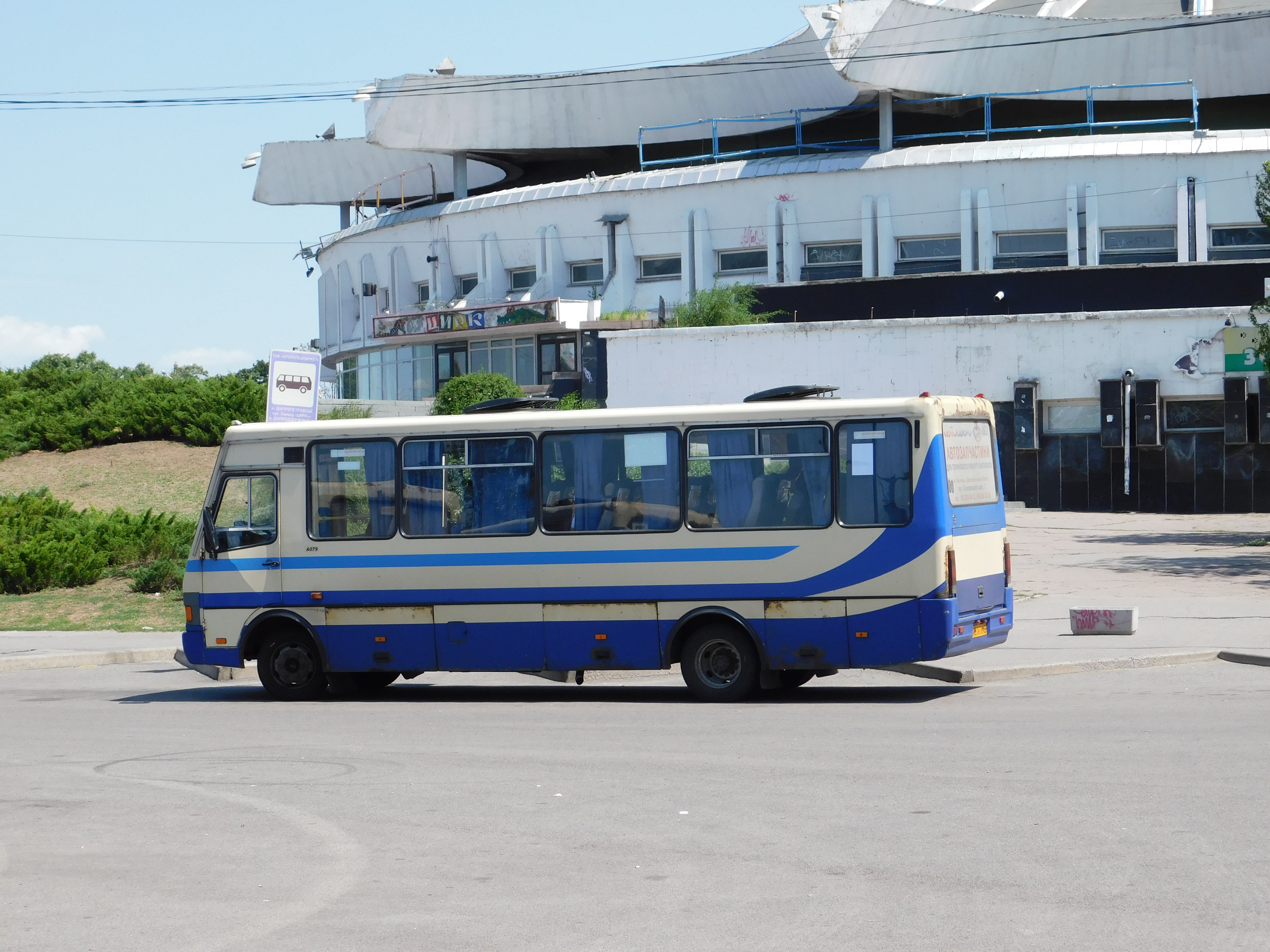
BAZ A079 Malva in Dnipro

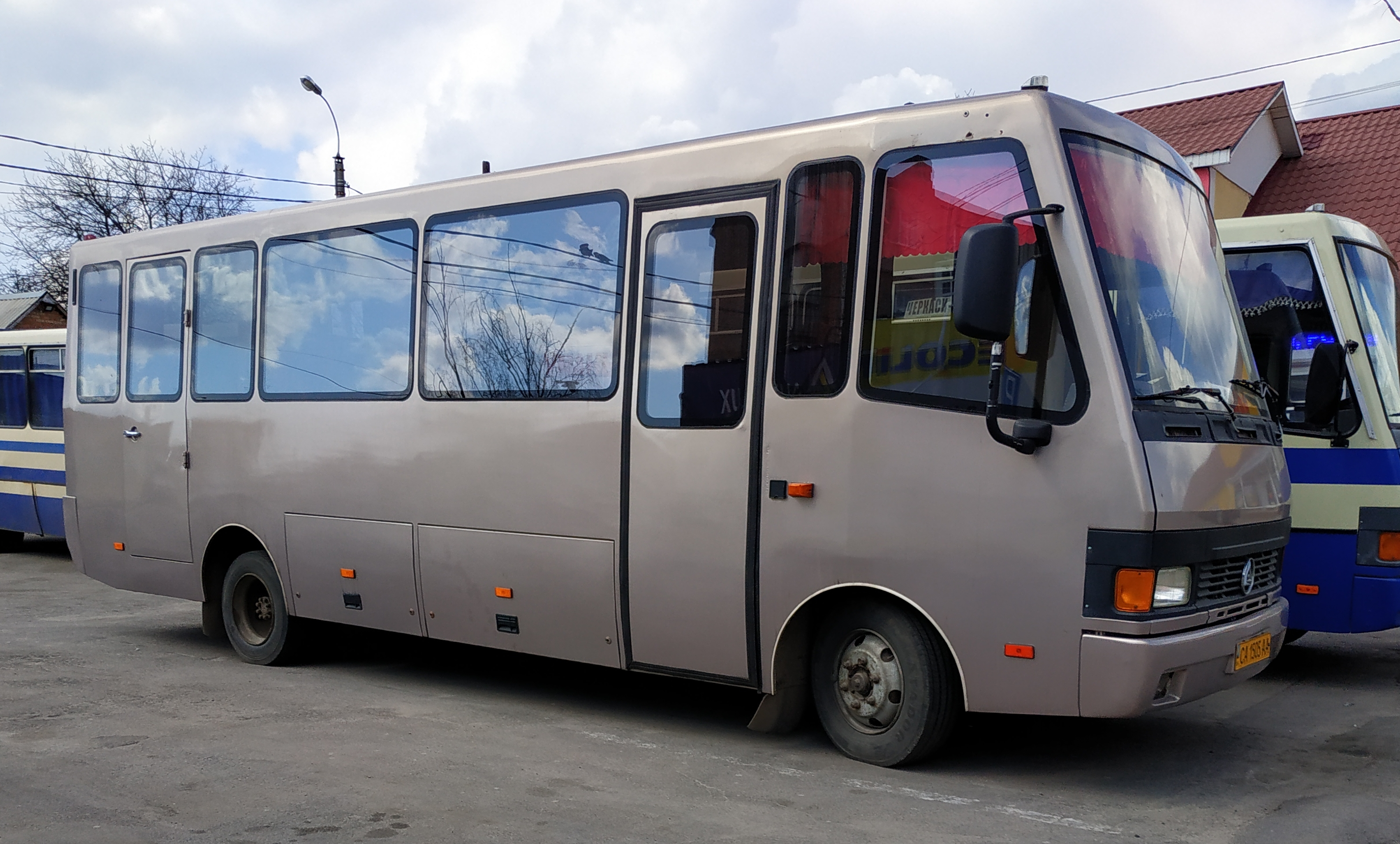
BAZ A079 Malva in Uman

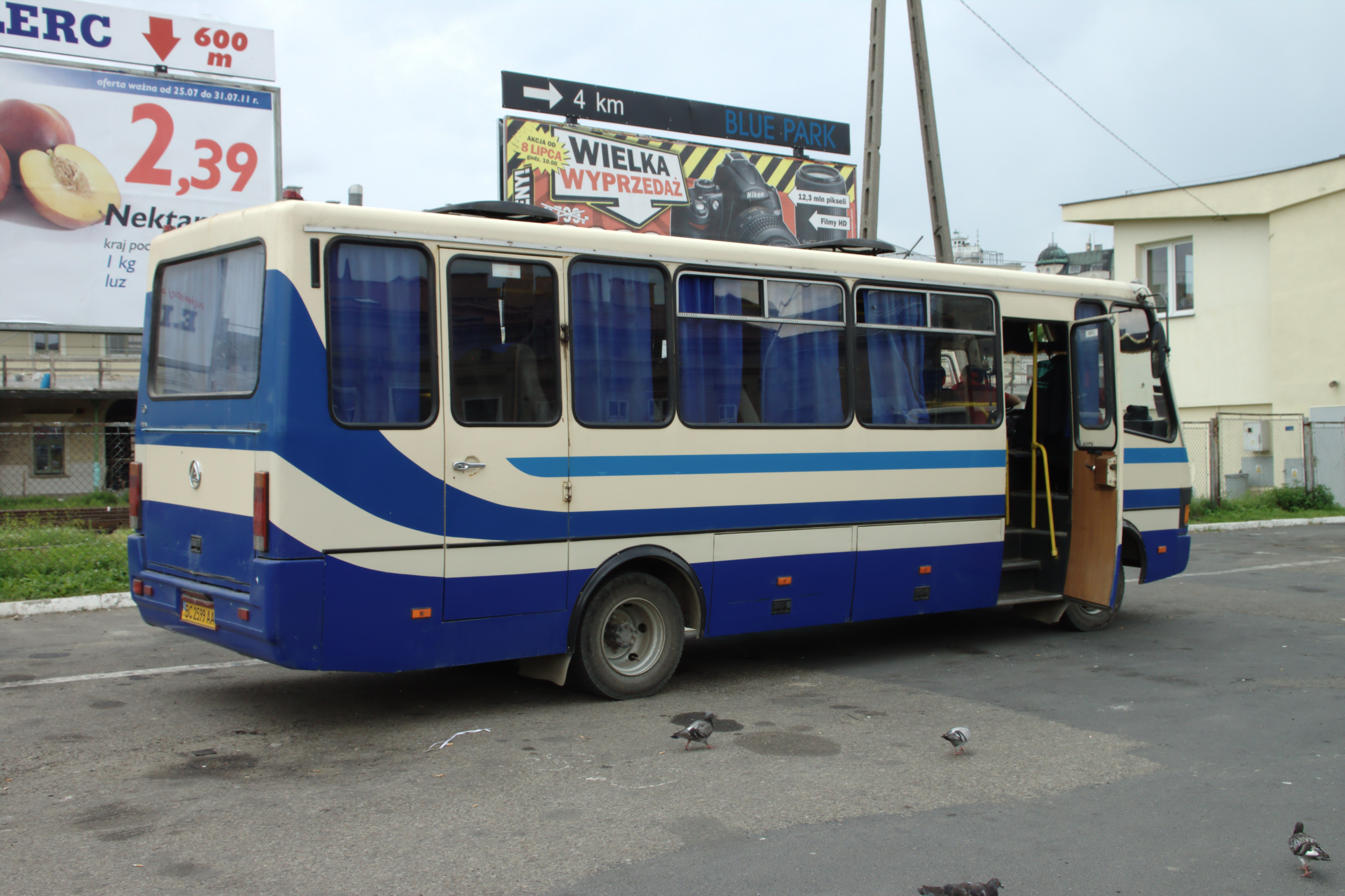
BAZ A079 Malva in Przemyśl
