= TEP70 =

Soviet passenger diesel locomotive

- TEP70-0124 with an express train from St. Petersburg to Minsk at Vitebsky railway station
Type and origin
- Power type: Diesel-electric
- Builder: Kolomna Locomotive Works
- Build date: TEP70: 1973–2006; TEP70BS: 2002, from 2006; TEP70U: 2006–2007
- Total produced: 994; TEP70: 576; TEP70BS: 383; 2TE70: 12; TEP70U: 26
Specifications
- Configuration
  - UIC: Co′Co′
- Gauge: 1,520 mm (4 ft 11 27/32 in) Russian gauge
- Bogies: TEP70A.31.00.002(-01); TEP70A.31.00.002-02(03)
- Wheel diameter: 1,220 mm (4 ft 0 in)
- Minimum curve: 125 m (410 ft)
- Wheelbase: Prototype: 4,600 mm (15 ft 1 in); Serial: 4,300 mm (14 ft 1 in)
- Length: Prototype: 20,470 mm (67 ft 2 in); Serial: 21,700 mm (71 ft 2 in)
- Width: 3,086 mm (10 ft 1.5 in)
- Height: Prototype: 5,080 mm (16 ft 8 in); Serial: 4,975 mm (16 ft 3.9 in)
- Axle load: Prototype: 21.5 t (21.16 long tons; 23.70 short tons); Serial: 22.5 t (22.14 long tons; 24.80 short tons)
- Service weight: Prototype: 129 t (126.96 long tons; 142.20 short tons); Serial: 135 t (132.87 long tons; 148.81 short tons)
- Fuel type: Diesel
- Prime mover: 2A-5D49 (16CH26/26)
- Engine type: Four-stroke diesel engine
- Traction motors: ED-119 (prototype); ED-121AU1 (serial); ED-150AU2 and EDU-133R (BS, U), DTK-417R (BS)
- Transmission: AC-DC Electric
- Gear ratio: TEP70, TEP70U, TEP70BS: 78 : 25 = 3,12 (at 160 km/h (99 mph)); TEP70BS: 83 : 20 = 4,15 (at 120 km/h (75 mph))
- Loco brake: Electric rheostatic (excluding prototype TEP70); Pneumatic; Electropneumatic
- Couplers: SA-3
Performance figures
- Maximum speed: 160 km/h (99 mph) (TEP70, TEP70U, and TEP70BS with bogies model TEP70A.31.00.002(-01)); 120 km/h (75 mph) (TEP70BS with bogies model TEP70A.31.00.002-02(03))
- Power output: 2,964 kW (3,975 hp)
- Tractive effort
  - Starting: TEP70, TEP70U, TEP70BS: 280 kN (62,946.50 lbf) (at 160 km/h (99 mph)); TEP70BS: 373 kN (83,853.74 lbf) (at 120 km/h (75 mph))
  - Continuous: TEP70, TEP70U, TEP70BS: 167 kN (37,543.09 lbf) (at 160 km/h (99 mph)); TEP70BS: 222 kN (49,907.59 lbf) (at 120 km/h (75 mph))
Career
- Operators: Soviet Railways (until 1991); Russian Railways; Ukrainian Railways; Belarusian Railway; Lithuanian Railways; Latvian Railways; Estonian Railways; Uzbek Railways; Kazakhstan Railways; Türkmendemirýollary
- Nicknames: Тапок (Slipper); Кирпич (Brick); Гроб (Coffin); Саркофаг (Sarcophagus); Горбатый (Hunchbacked)
- Locale: TEP70: USSR (until 1991); Russia; Ukraine; Belarus; Lithuania; Latvia; Estonia; Uzbekistan; Kazakhstan; TEP70BS: Russia; Belarus; Lithuania; Turkmenistan; Uzbekistan; TEP70U: Russia
- Disposition: TEP70: 309 in service 105 out of order, 5 preserved (1 cab preserved), remainder scrapped TEP70BS: 319 in service 51 out of order, 9 scrapped, 5 not yet entered service

TEP70 (Russian: ТЭП70, type 70) is a class of Soviet mainline passenger diesel-electric locomotives with AC-DC electric transmission, manufactured in the USSR and Russia at the Kolomna Locomotive Works from 1973 to 2006. Since 2006, the TEP70BS locomotive, based on this design, was produced. It also served as the basis for the mainline passenger locomotive TEP70U and the dual unit freight locomotive 2TE70. The crew compartment of the TEP70 and a similarly designed body are also used on the EP2K DC electric passenger locomotive.

== History ==
=== Before the design ===
==== Early development ====
The increase in the weight and speed of passenger trains in the 1970s required the use of more powerful locomotives than the TEP60 on certain lines. On the Privolzhskaya, October, and some other railways, 2TEP60 locomotives (or the same TEP60s in double heading) began to be used. However, the use of dual-unit locomotives led to a significant increase in maintenance and operational costs. It became necessary to develop a locomotive with greater power than the TEP60, yet still in a single unit configuration.

In addition, the design of the TEP60 locomotive had a number of shortcomings. In particular, the two-stroke 11D45 diesel engine could not meet future requirements due to its high fuel consumption. The running gear of the TEP60 locomotive provided a smooth ride, but required a significant amount of maintenance.

The design of the TEP70 locomotive started at Kolomna Locomotive Works in 1969 under the chief constructor, Yu. V. Khlebnikov. The design had a weight of 135 t (132.87 long tons; 148.81 short tons) with Co'Co' wheel arrangement and a maximum speed of 160 km/h (99 mph), fitted with 2,264kw (3,975hp) Kolomna DA-5D49 four-stroke V16 diesel engine. Engineers demonstrated that a diesel locomotive with this design was a practical concept.

==== Visit to the United Kingdom ====
In 1969, it was decided for a Soviet railway delegation from the Ministry of Ways & Communications (MPS) to visit the United Kingdom, as part of a programme of exchange of expert groups. The group was led by Dr N. A. Frufrianskii, who was both deputy director of the All-Union Railway Scientific Research Institute (VNIIZhT) and head of the railway research and test centre at Shcherbinka. The main reason for a visit was to examine the technology and design of British diesel locomotives operating on the British Rail Network, one of them was mostly the British Rail HS4000 "Kestrel" prototype, which was the most technologically advanced locomotive in Britain at that time.

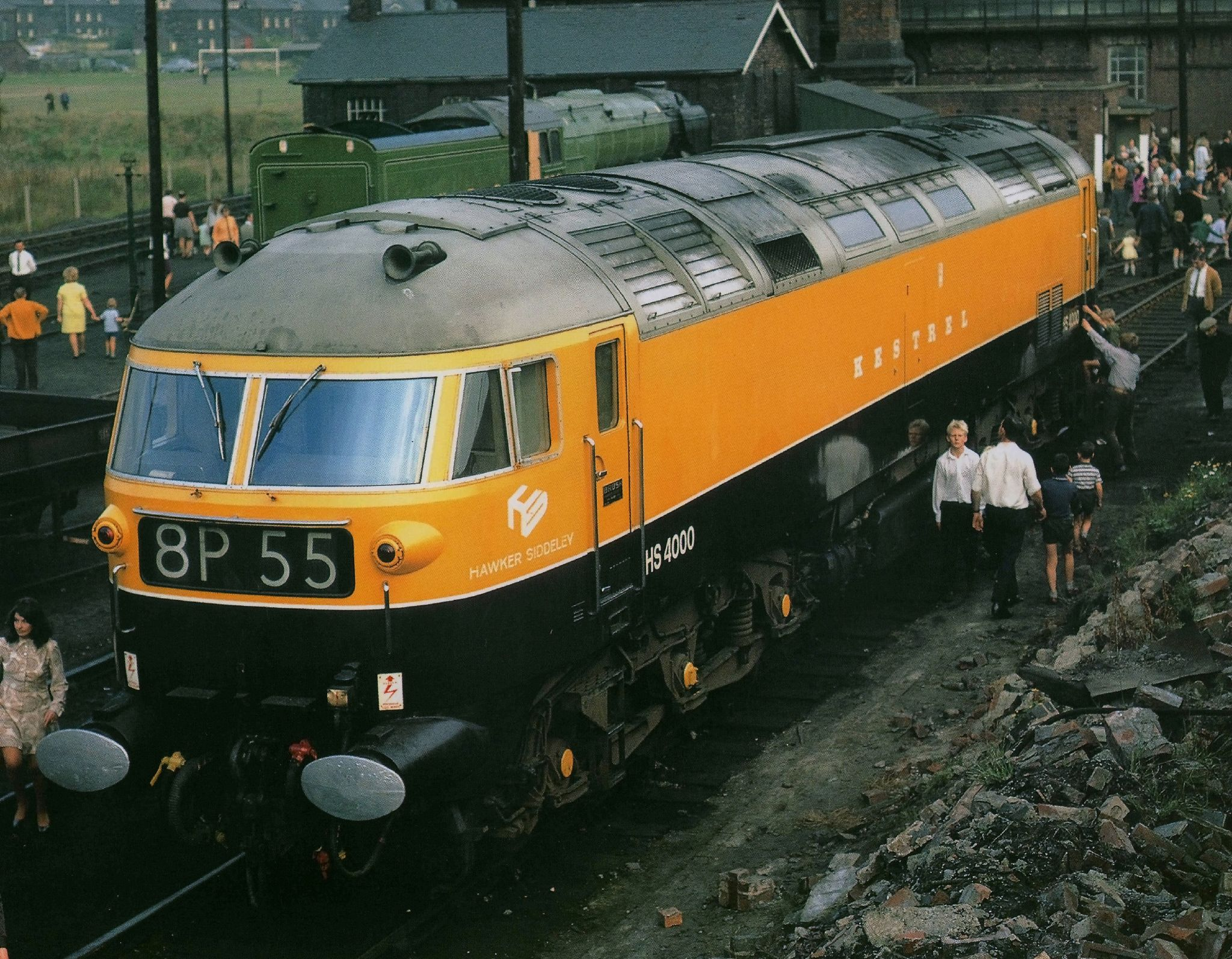
British Rail HS4000 "Kestrel", a British locomotive where most of TEP70's technology was derived from

One of the visits was to the Brush Traction works at Loughborough, where Kestrel was on display. Frufrianskii’s group was greatly impressed by the innovative features: its AC-DC transmission, electronic control system, electrodynamic brakes, fault indicator system, and a two-stage suspension that made the locomotive suitable for both passenger and freight traffic, the cab design and the level of crew comfort was also far in advance of anything found on Soviet locomotives. Frufrianskii in its own words said "Kestrel incorporated all that was best in world diesel locomotive design and construction, and fundamentally new technical ideas. It was the shape of things to come."

A few days later, at a chance encounter in London, Mr F. Beasant, head of Brush Traction, asked Dr Frufrianskii whether the USSR would be interested in buying the locomotive, Frufrianskii replied cautiously that as a member of a scientific institute, he had no power to make purchasing decisions but undertook to make a report to the MPS on his return to Moscow, which Frufrianskii did, recommending that negotiations should be opened with Brush Traction. The stated objective was to see how the HS4000 locomotive performed under the Soviet railway conditions by comparison with the current mainline passenger locomotive, TEP60.

The unstated objective was to stimulate the Soviet locomotive manufacturing industry where managerial success was measured by building “more of the same” to meet production requirements rather than experimenting with new and untried designs. The MPS took the decision in principle to purchase in early 1971, the question was the amount of money to pay, and to that end a somewhat roundabout approach was adopted.

==== Kestrel technology examination ====
The locomotive changed its track gauge to 1,520 mm (4 ft 11 27/32 in) Russian gauge, and the cabs were boarded over to protect them during the sea voyage, it arrived at Cardiff Docks and was loaded onto the freighter Krasnokamsk, it was then shipped to Leningrad.

Two series of tests were carried out between 1972 and 1973 to gather comprehensive data upon further aspects of the locomotive. The first were dynamic tests to assess the locomotives' riding qualities and effect upon the permanent way. These tests were carried out on the Ozerskaya branch near Kolomna Locomotive Works and on a stretch of a high speed railway line between Belorechenskaya and Maikop. The second set of tests was on the 6km circuit at Shcherbinka, where the locomotives' power plant, cooling system, electrical machinery and electronic control systems were assessed. Ease of maintenance tests were also carried out.

The technology from the British locomotive was later put into the Soviet locomotive in 1973, incorporating much of the technology from it.

=== Production ===
The first diesel locomotive according to the new design was built in June 1973. The locomotive was designated TEP70-0001. In 1974–1975, locomotives 0002, 0003, 0004 were built, and in 1977–1978 — 0005, 0006, 0007. The locomotives began undergoing operational tests on the Belarusian Railway. The TEP70-0005 locomotive underwent thermal and dynamic (impact on the track) tests.

The experience gained from the tests provided the designers of the Kolomna Plant with valuable information for making modifications to the design of the diesel locomotive. A decisive role was played by the construction in 1976 of the experimental diesel locomotive TEP75-0001, with a power of 6,000 hp and a 20-cylinder 20ChN26/26 diesel engine, which incorporated the latest solutions at that time in the domestic locomotive building practice, particularly concerning the running gear. Starting in 1978, the plant began the construction of diesel locomotives numbered from 0008, which differed significantly from their predecessors, essentially constituting a new series of locomotives under the former designation (in fact, it was a TEP75 with a simpler diesel-generator 2A-9DG with a 16-cylinder 16ChN26/26 diesel engine producing 4,000 hp, equipped with turbocharging, more in line with the production realities at the Kolomna Plant).

Further modifications to the design were made during production. Three main types of TEP70 locomotives are generally distinguished:

- experimental 0001–0007
- serial numbers 0008–0185, with vertically arranged marker lights, and riveted panel joints of the bodywork
- Serial units with No. 0186, with horizontally arranged buffer lights, and a mixed connection of body panels. Among locomotives of the last type, a number of changes were also introduced into the design during production.
  - Prototype No. 0316, equipped with a microprocessor control and diagnostic system with a distributed architecture.
  - serial numbers from No. 0340, with the replacement of the body panels from aluminum alloys to steel and the flooring of the diesel room from aluminum to cast iron.
  - No. 0400 and all series units from No. 0414 onwards are equipped with a standardized locomotive automation system (USTA)
  - No. 0562 is an experimental diesel locomotive designed for sections with steep and long inclines, equipped with gearboxes with a gear ratio of 4.15, as a result of which the design speed is reduced to 120 km/h (75 mph).
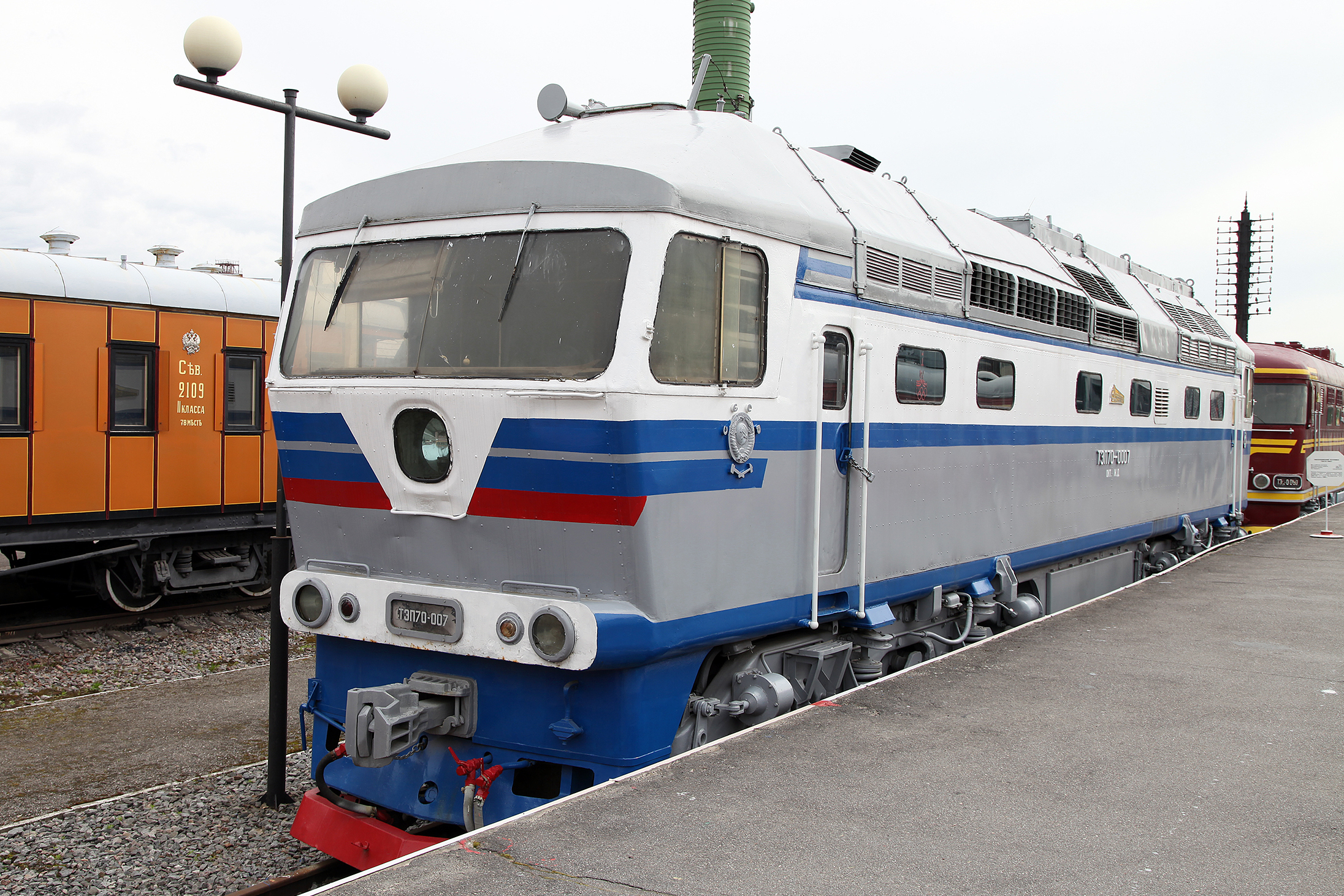
TEP70-0007 locomotive of the first type. Built in 1977

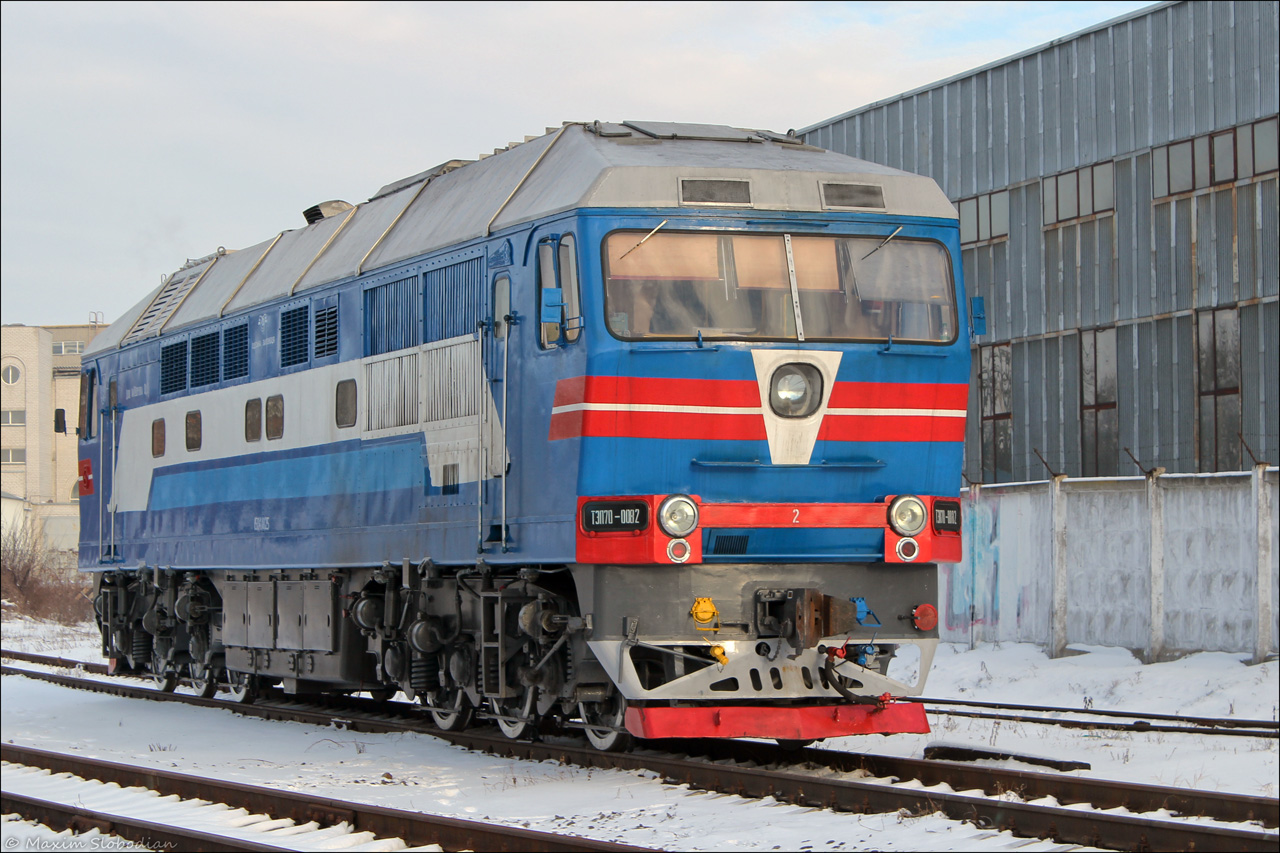
TEP70-0082 locomotive of the second type. Built in 1987

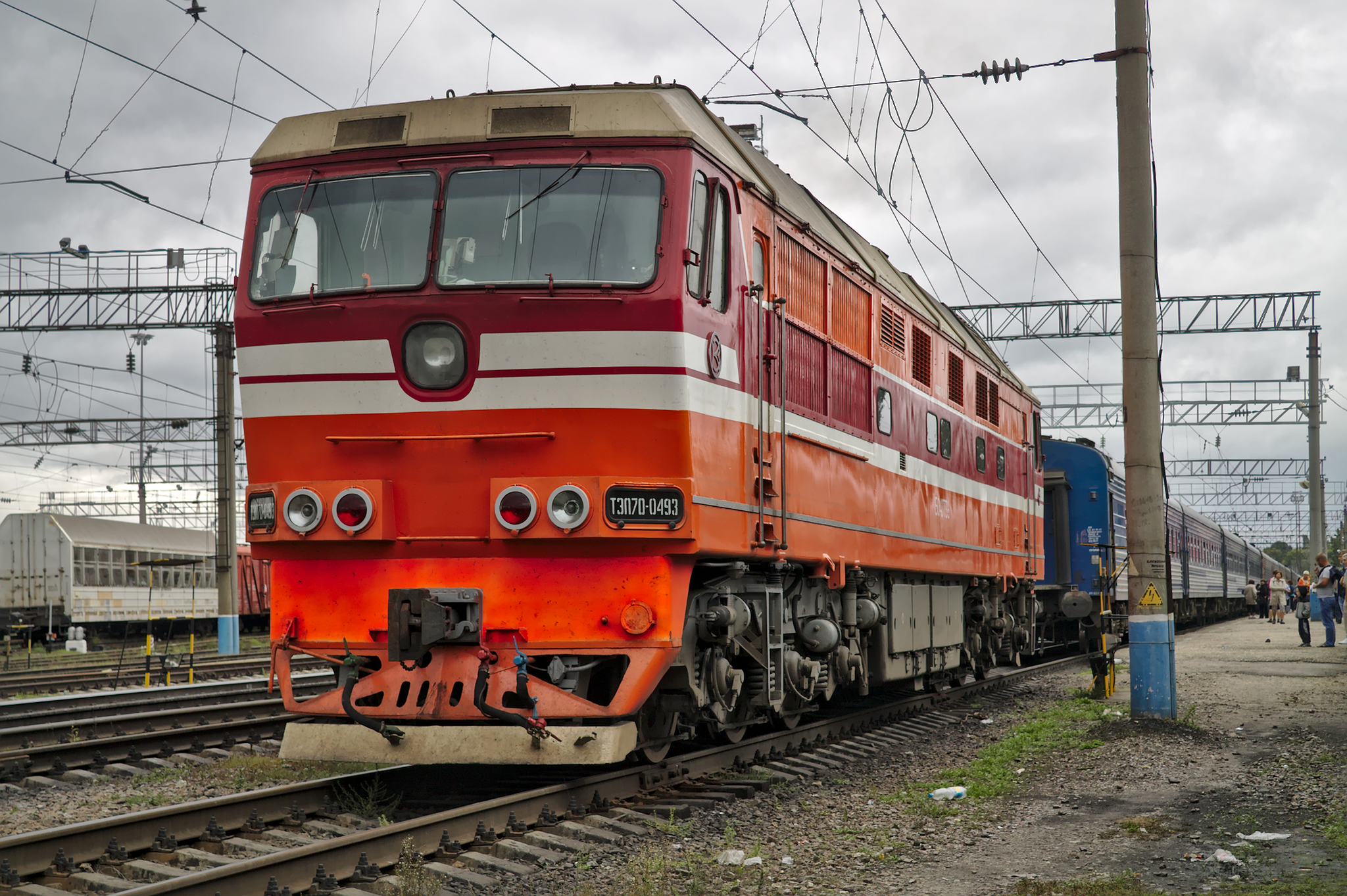
TEP70-0493 locomotive of the third type. Built in 2003.

=== Modifications ===
==== TEP70BS ====
In 2002, the Kolomna Plant produced the TEP70A-001 diesel locomotive, which was the result of the further improvement of the TEP70. Compared to the TEP70, it primarily differed by having more technologically advanced body, the presence of the MSUD (microprocessor control and diagnostic system), as well as an electric train heating system (a 3000-volt cable connected to the first car of the passenger train), similar to passenger electric locomotives. In 2003, in honor of the Hero of Socialist Labor — Boris Konstantinovich Salambekov, the TEP70A series was renamed the TEP70BS (Boris Salambekov). Since then, all locomotives of the class, starting from number 002 and onwards, have been produced under this designation. Serial production of the locomotives began in 2006.

In the factory, TEP70BS locomotives initially received a red paint scheme with stylized two-color patterned lines at the front and on the sides, corresponding to the colors of the flag of the country of operation: for Russian locomotives, the lines were white and blue, forming together with the main red at the bottom the Russian flag; for Lithuanian locomotives, they were yellow and green, forming together with the main red at the bottom the Lithuanian flag; for Belarusian locomotives, they were white and green, as used on the Belarusian flag. On the front walls of the cab, these lines have a shape similar to a curved number '7'. On the side walls of Russian and Belarusian locomotives, the curving patterns are located in the cab area and resemble horizontally connected mirror-symmetrical letters 'L', while on Lithuanian locomotives, they are placed near the entry doors on the side opposite the cab with inverted symmetry.

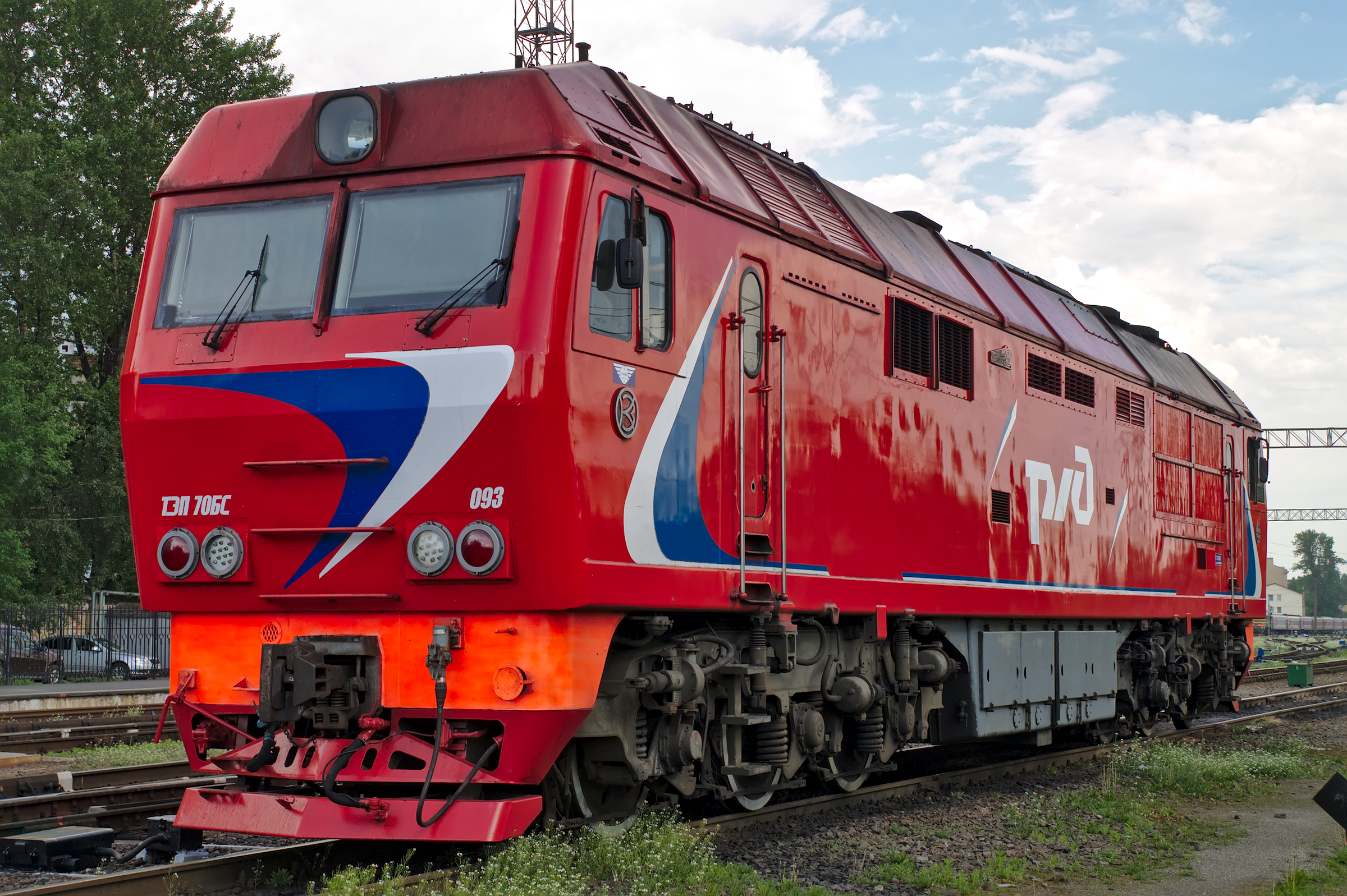
TEP70BS-093 of the Russian Railways at St. Petersburg Vitebsky railway station

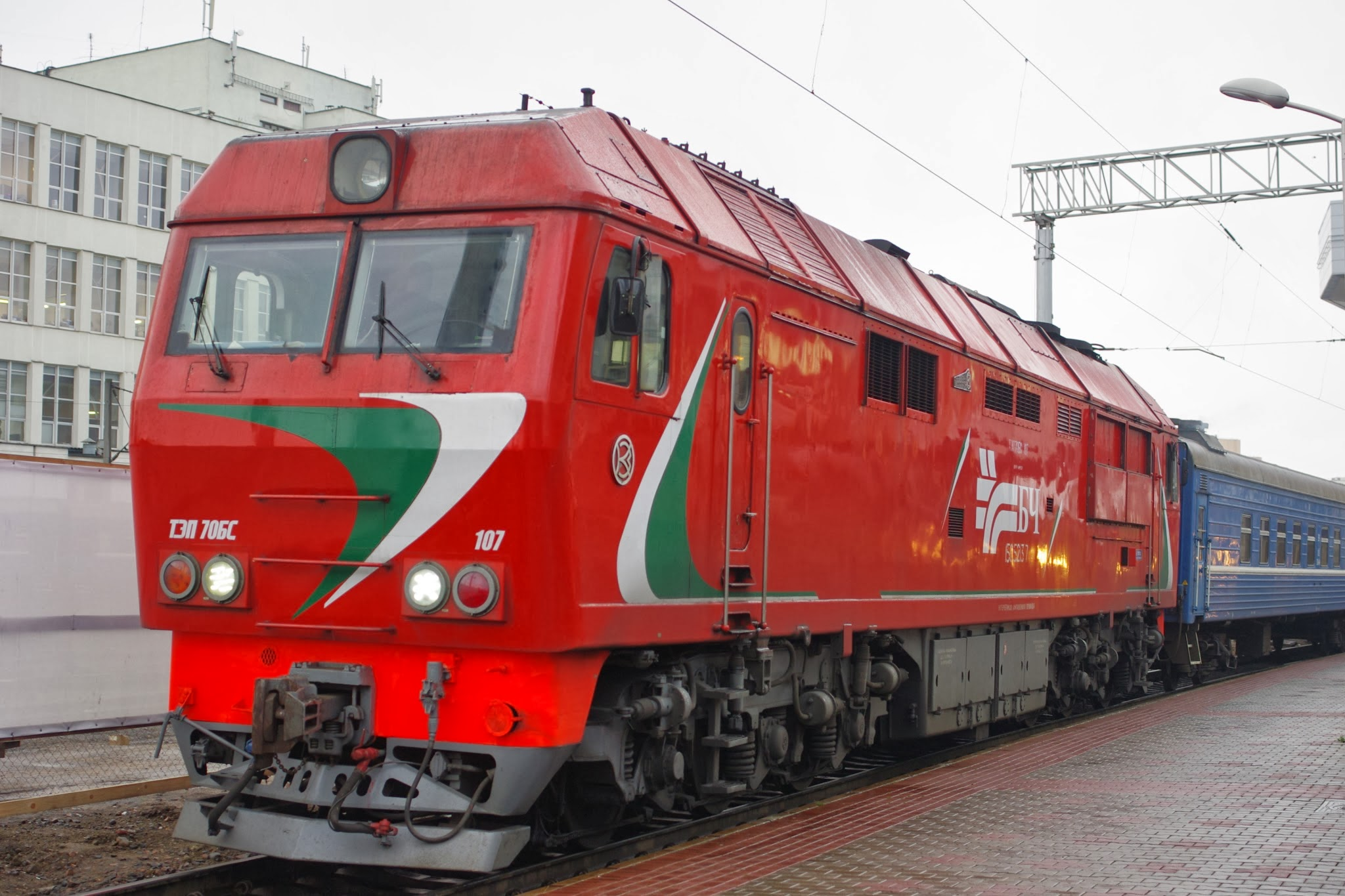
TEP70BS-107 of Belarusian Railways at Minsk railway station

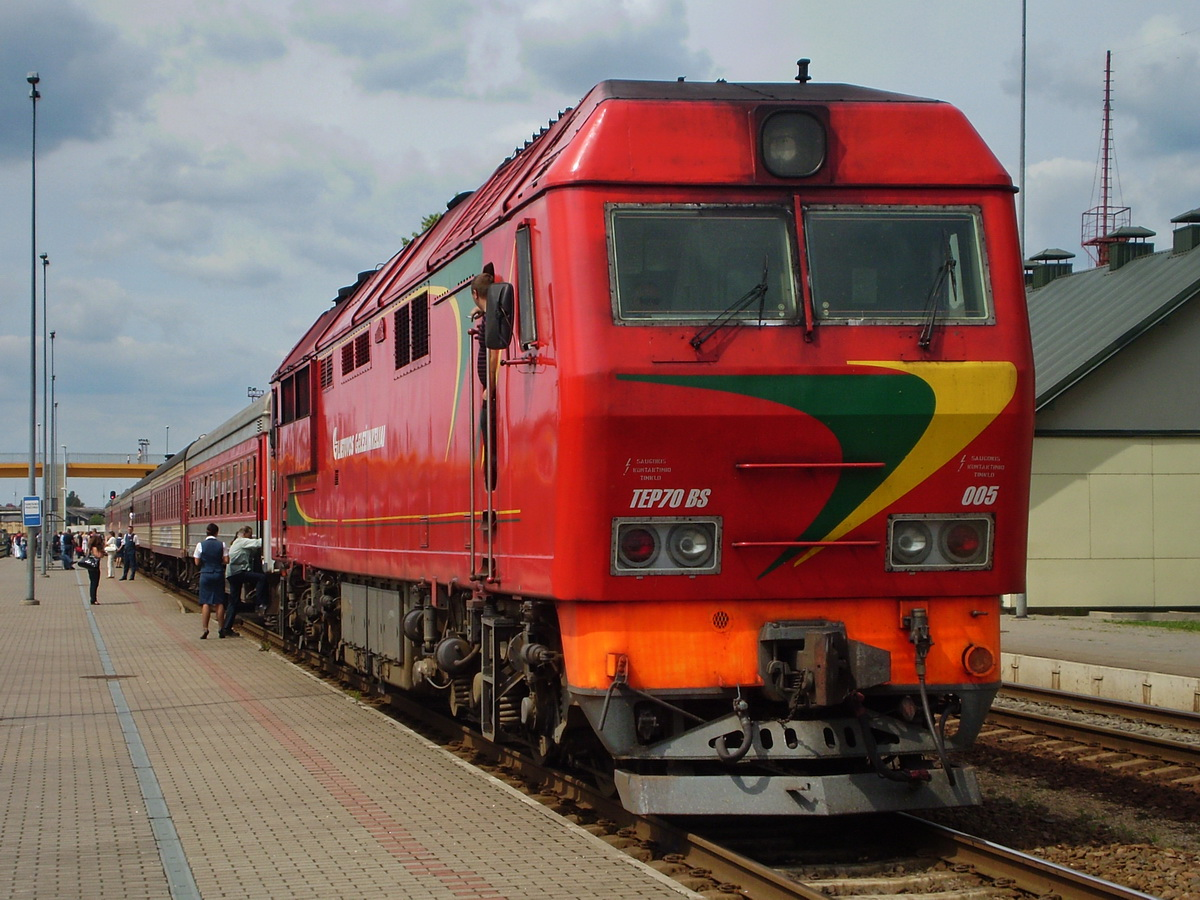
TEP70BS-005 of Lithuanian Railways at Šiauliai railway station

Later models of locomotives for Russia were painted in the official corporate livery of Russian Railways, with curved lines of variable thickness (the upper half of the front mask and a narrow stripe at the top of the sides were red, the middle and upper parts of the side walls between the cabs were light gray, and the lower part was dark gray). Uzbekistani locomotives were painted in a similar way, but with a different color scheme — blue at the top and bottom, green in the middle of the sides, with white and red separating stripes between the green and upper blue areas.

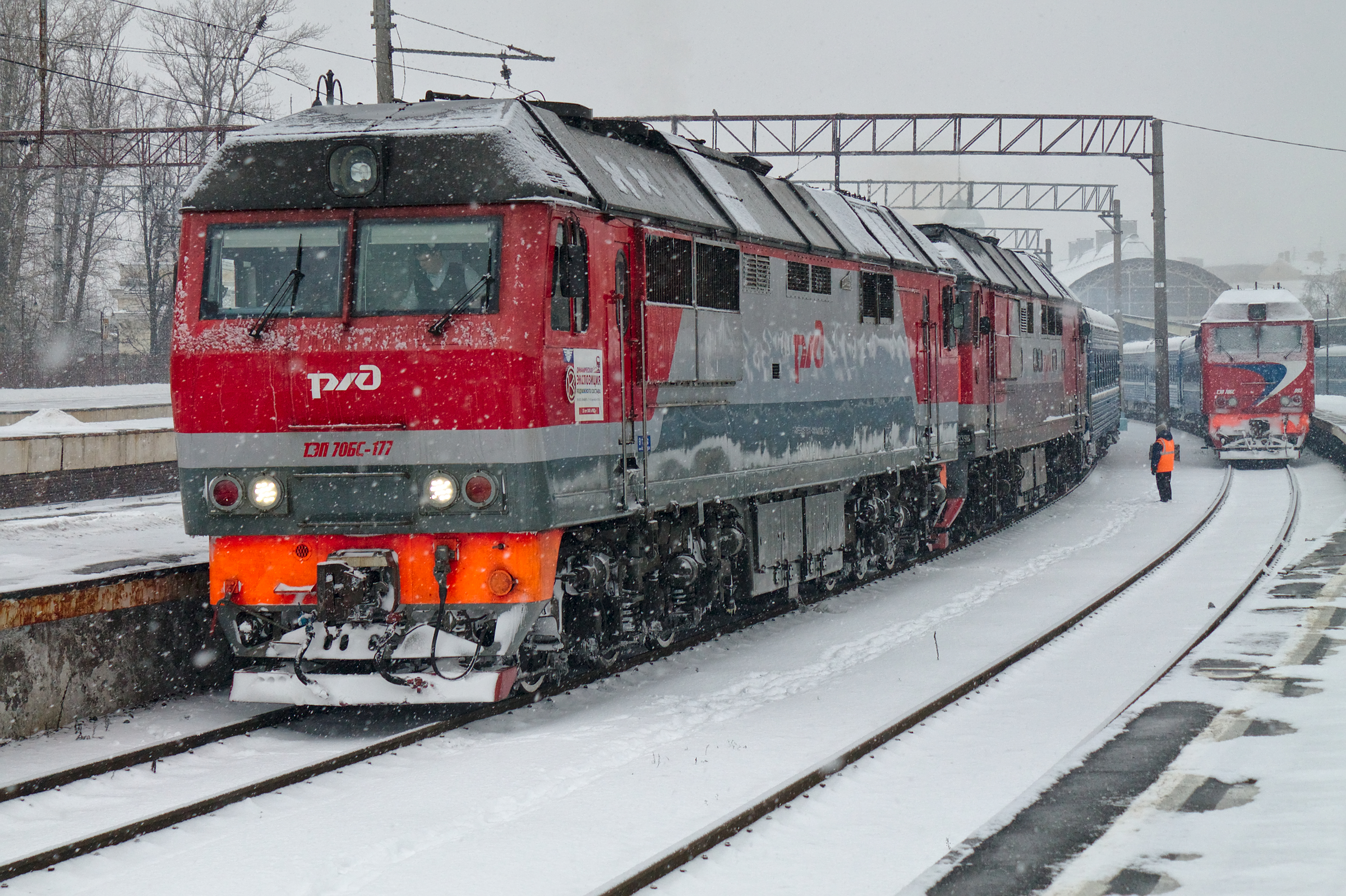
TEP70BS-177 in the Russian Railways corporate livery with a passenger train at St. Petersburg Vitebsky railway station

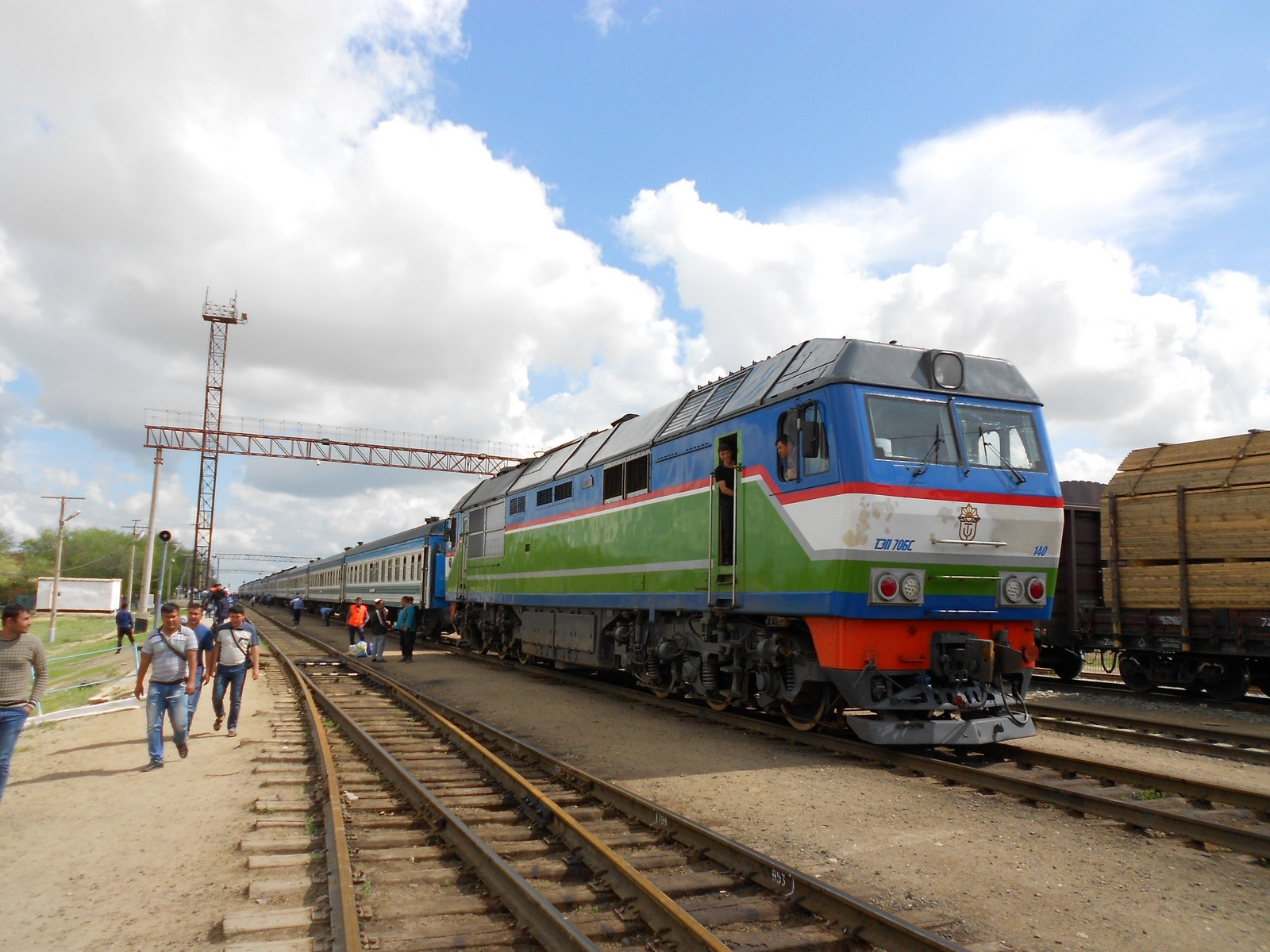
TEP70BS-140 in Uzbek Railways livery at Karakalpakia railway station

The TEP70BS locomotive has two main variants, which differ in the gear ratio of the reducers and, accordingly, in continuous operating speeds and design speeds, as well as in the transition speeds to the first and second stages of traction motor field weakening and back. The first version has a gear ratio of i = 3.12, as in the TEP70 locomotive, and a design speed of 160 km/h (99 mph). In this version were the diesel locomotives of the initial production series and part of the 200 series numbers, as well as some later locomotives with a two-wire power supply system for operating "Lastochka" electric trains, and all export locomotives. The second version features traction gear reducers with a gear ratio of 4.15, as on the experimental TEP70-0562 locomotive, which allows for an increase in the continuous permissible tractive effort at low speeds (for operating long trains on extended ascents in mountainous areas with limited speed), however, the design speed of the locomotive is reduced to 120 km/h (75 mph). This version constitutes the main production in terms of volume.

The numbering of machines of both design versions is sequential; an indicative list with build dates is provided above.

Since 2018, TEP70BS locomotives of a new design have been produced, starting from number 316, equipped with an improved power supply system for passenger cars. These locomotives can provide power supply both through the classical single-wire system and the new two-wire train power supply system, which allows for the elimination of using rails as the return conductor and, accordingly, the need to install choke transformers in the rail circuit (most non-electrified lines are not equipped with choke transformers, which previously made it impossible to use electric heating via the single-wire scheme). They can also be operated in a two-unit system from the cab of the leading locomotive, including with parallel operation of the power supply generators for the needs of a passenger train. In June 2018, JSC "Kolomna Plant" received a certificate of conformity for the TEП70BS locomotive of this modification. The design speed of this version of the locomotive, as well as the base version, is 120 km/h (75 mph) or 160 km/h (99 mph).

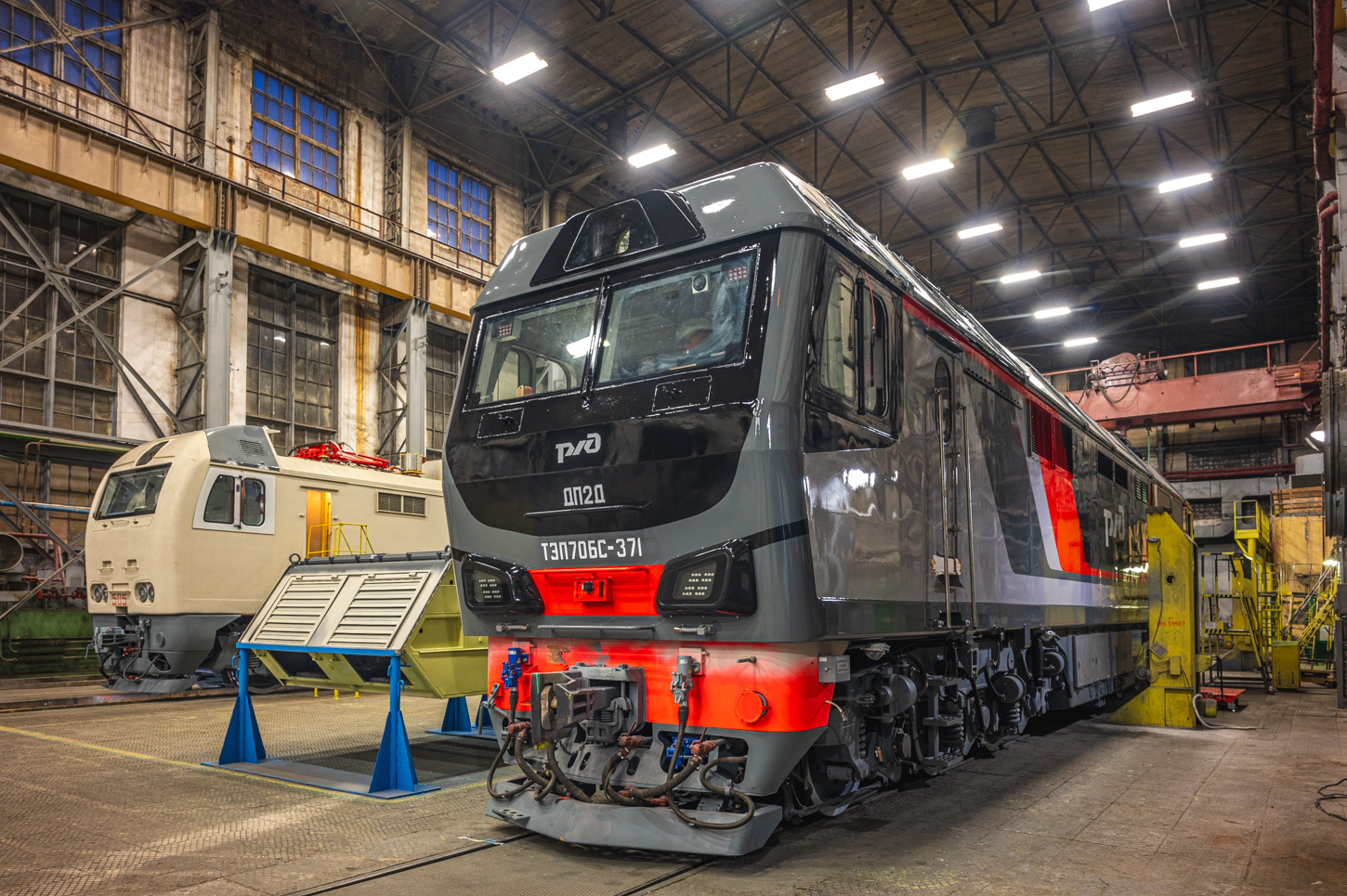
TEP70BS-371 locomotive for operation as part of a DP2D push-pull train

In early 2025, the Kolomna Plant produced the first TEP70BS-371 locomotive in a new version, equipped with a remote control system for operation as part of shuttle trains of the "push-pull" type with a fixed formation. The locomotive was fitted with a new headlight and protruding trapezoid-shaped LED buffer lamps, between which connectors for remote control cables were installed, and red tail lights were placed behind the front window to indicate the rear of the train when moving in pushing mode. In the driver's cab, the control panel was equipped with additional buttons for operating automatic doors and carriage systems, displays for monitoring and controlling systems and video surveillance in the carriages, and a "passenger-driver" voice communication system. From the factory, the locomotive received the new black-and-gray corporate livery of Russian Railways. The locomotive was manufactured in a low-speed version with a design speed of 120 km/h (75 mph). This locomotive and its future analogs are intended to be used together with the leading and intermediate cars produced by the Demikhovo Machinebuilding Plant, which were classified as the DP2D diesel multiple unit. At the same time, this set is strictly speaking not a diesel train, since according to the definition it must include at least one motor car, which is conventionally assumed to be the locomotive; however, this locomotive is not a specialized single-cab traction head unified with the cars and can operate as a full-fledged locomotive within a regular train, including under a multiple-unit system. In the end of March 2025, after factory testing, the locomotive was sent to the Demikhov Plant for coupling with the cars to form the DP2D train set and for joint testing with it.

==== TEP70U ====
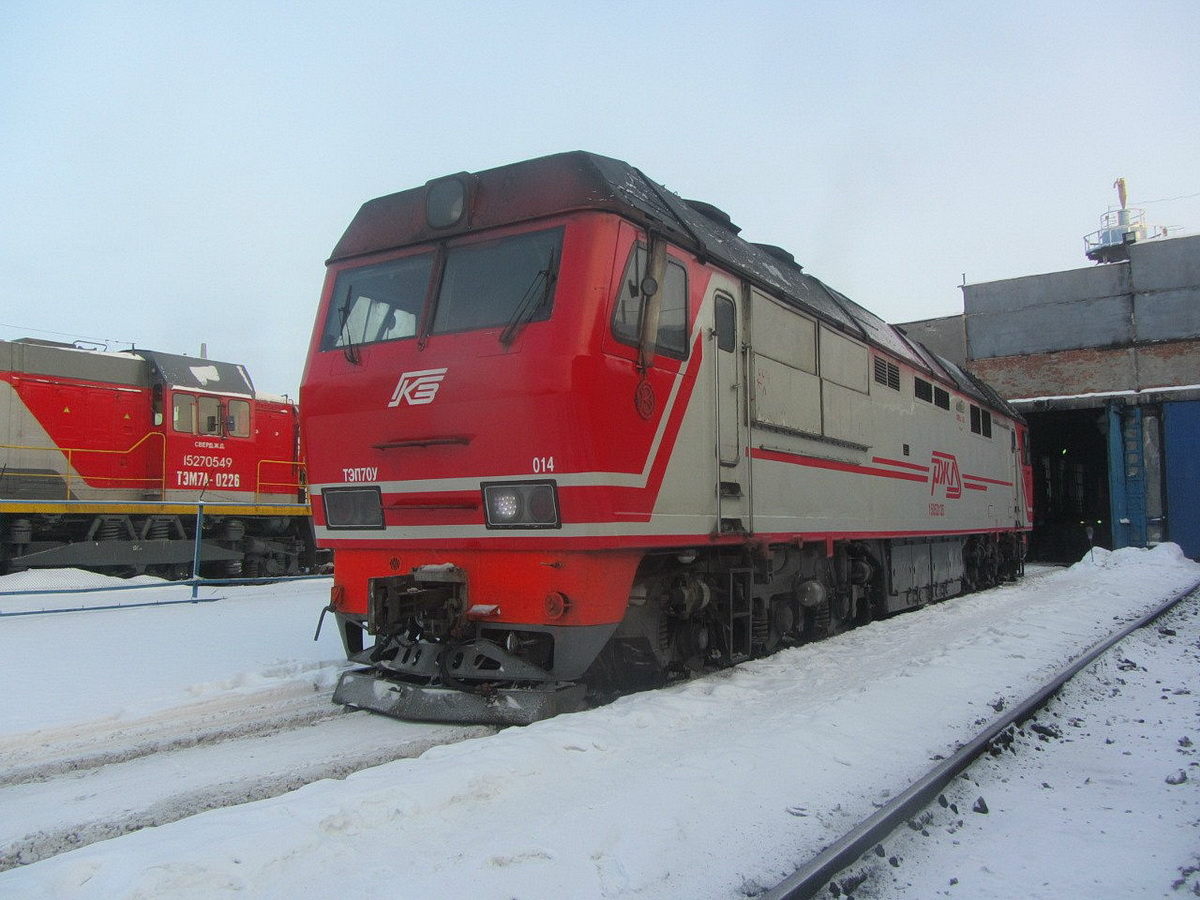
TEP70U-14 at Surgut depot

The TEP70U diesel locomotive was created based on the TEP70BS. The differences are limited to the installation of a slightly more powerful 2A-9DG-02 diesel generator with an output of 3000 kW instead of 2942 kW (4080 hp instead of 4000 hp) and the absence of the train's electric heating system used on TEP70BS locomotives. In practice, electric heating from the locomotive via the standard single-wire scheme is used only on the Rtishevo — Kochetovka and Krymskaya — Taman-Passazhirskaya sections; on other sections, it is practically not used due to the lack of choke transformers, which pass high current bypassing the insulating joints of signaling systems, on most non-electrified lines in Russia.

==== 2TE70 ====
Based on the design of the TEP70 locomotives, the dual-unit freight locomotive 2TE70 was made, unified in its main components with the passenger locomotives TEP70U and TEP70BS, intended for hauling freight trains. Each unit has only one driver's cab, and at the point of coupling, the units have ends with an inter-section gangway. Compared to the TEP70BS and TEP70U, the adhesive weight of each unit is increased by 6 tonnes (5.91 long tons; 6.61 short tons), from 135 to 141 tonnes (132.87 to 138.77 long tons; 148.81 to 155.43 short tons); the locomotive's electrical circuit underwent significant changes, in particular, axle-by-axle traction control was implemented. The fuel capacity was increased, a gearbox with a higher gear ratio was used, resulting in a maximum speed reduction to 110 km/h (68 mph).

The first diesel locomotive was showcased on 14 July 2004. The locomotive underwent the necessary tests, and a certificate of compliance with the safety standards NB JТ CT 02-98 was obtained for the machine from the certification body of the Federal Budgetary Institution "RS FZhT." In 2006, a second diesel locomotive was built, and in 2007, another 10 locomotives. All 12 locomotives left the factory with a two-tone paint scheme of blue and silver-white: the cabs, front, sides, and the middle height area of the side walls were painted blue, while the upper and lower parts of the side walls were painted gray. As of 2017, the locomotives were assigned to the Kotlas depot.

The project of a dual-unit freight diesel locomotive based on the TEP70 was developed by the Kolomna Plant back in the 1980s; however, the Ministry of Railways preferred the 2TE121 diesel locomotive, which was being introduced at that time by the Voroshilovgrad Locomotive Factory named after the October Revolution (VZOR).

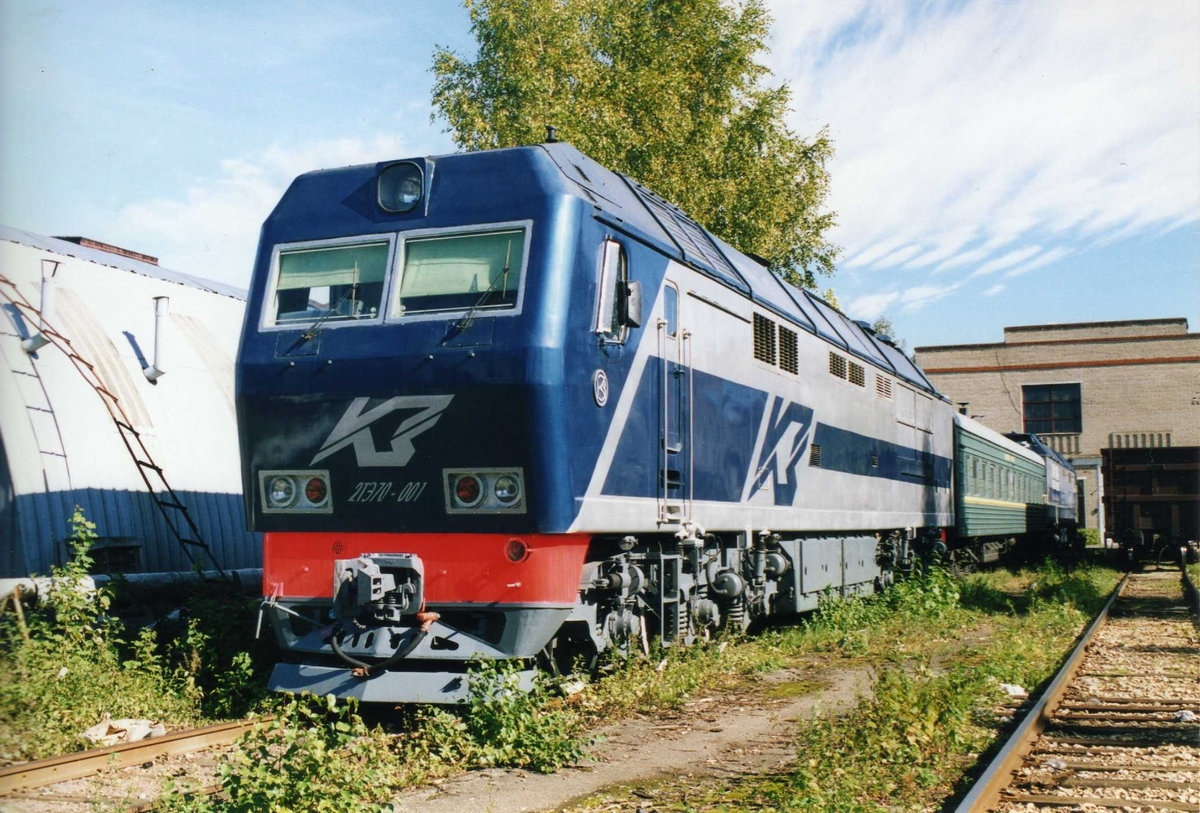
2TE70-001

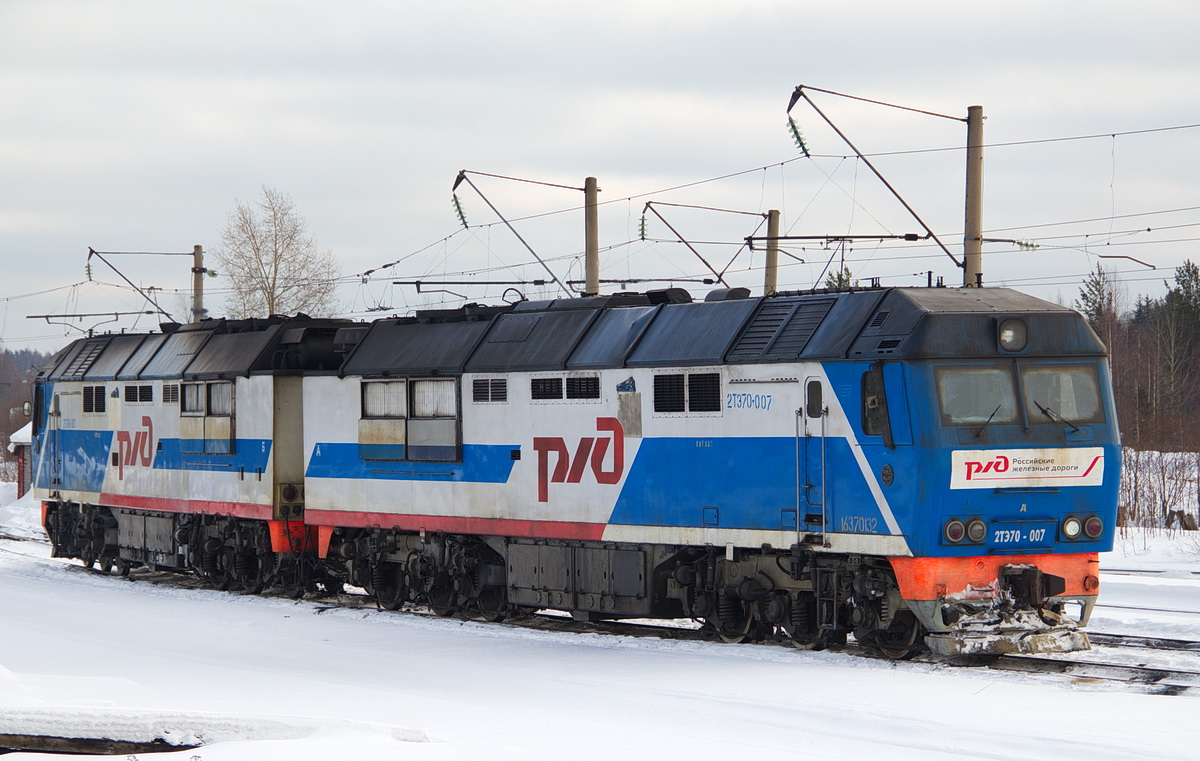
2TE70-007

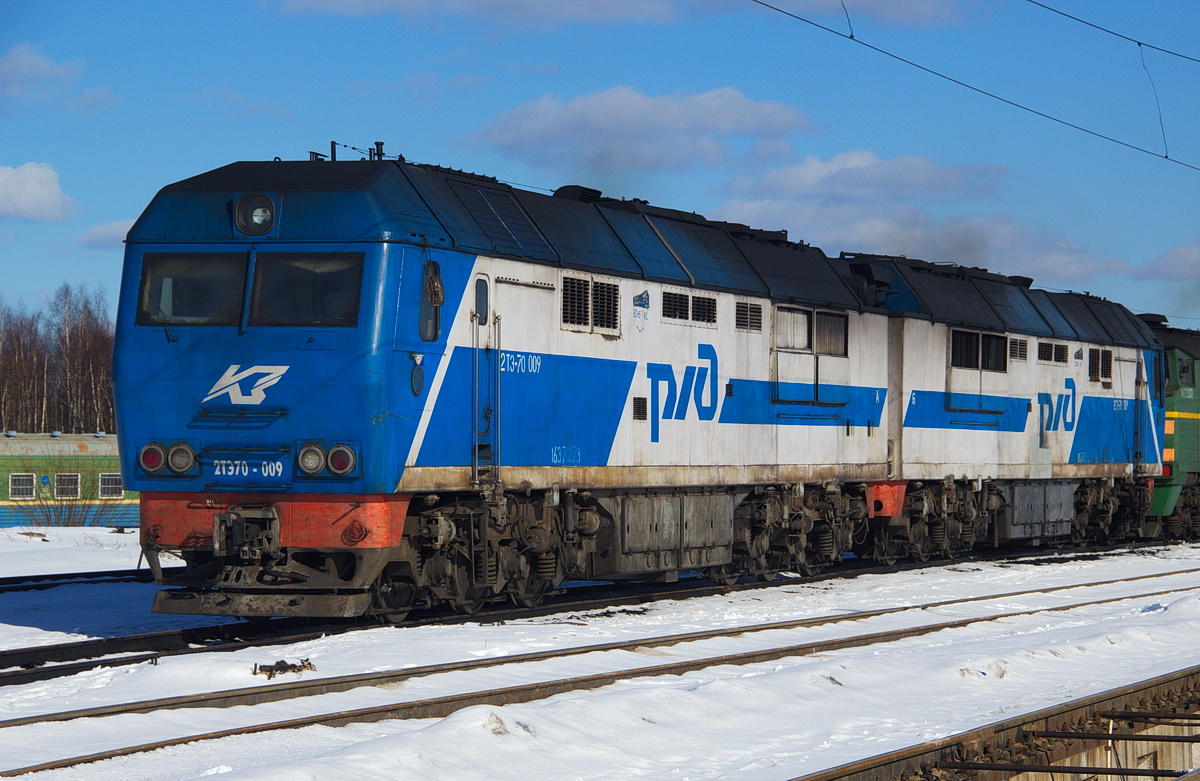
2TE70-009

=== Locomotive production figures ===
As of the beginning of 2026, a total of 576 TEP70 locomotives, 12 2TE70 locomotives, 26 TEP70U locomotives, and 380 TEP70BS locomotives have been built. The details on the production of TEP70 locomotives and their modifications by year are presented in the table:

Build date	Class	Number of locomotives	Fleet numbers
1973	TEP70 (prototype)	2	0001–0002
1974	TEP70 (prototype)	1	0003
1975	TEP70 (prototype)	1	0004
1976	TEP70 (prototype)	2	0005–0006
1977	TEP70 (prototype)	1	0007
1978	TEP70	2	0008–0009
1979	TEP70	2	0010–0011
1980	TEP70	2	0012–0013
1981	TEP70	2	0014–0015
1982	TEP70	2	0016–0017
1983	TEP70	3	0018–0020
1984	TEP70	5	0021–0025
1985	TEP70	10	0026–0035
1986	TEP70	21	0036–0056
1987	TEP70	37	0057–0093
1988	TEP70	54	0094–0147
1989	TEP70	51	0148–0198
1990	TEP70	46	0199–0244
1991	TEP70	39	0245–0283
1992	TEP70	33	0284–0316
1993	TEP70	22	0317–0338
1994	TEP70	16	0339–0354
1995	TEP70	12	0355–0366
1996	TEP70	10	0367–0376
1997	TEP70	8	0377–0384
1998	TEP70	10	0385–0394
1999	TEP70	15	0395–0409
2000	TEP70	21	0410–0430
2001	TEP70	22	0431–0452
2002	TEP70	23	0453–0475
2002	TEP70BS	1	001
2003	TEP70	23	0476–0498
2004	TEP70	32	0499–0530
2004	2TE70	1	001
2005	TEP70	45	0531–0575
2006	TEP70	1	0576
2006	TEP70BS	24	002–025
2006	TEP70U	16	001–016
2006	2TE70	1	002
2007	TEP70BS	24	026–049
2007	TEP70U	10	017–026
2007	2TE70	10	003–012
2008	TEP70BS	37	050–086
2009	TEP70BS	22	087–108
2010	TEP70BS	26	109–134
2011	TEP70BS	28	135–162
2012	TEP70BS	30	163–192
2013	TEP70BS	42	193–234
2014	TEP70BS	32	235–266
2015	TEP70BS	15	267–281
2016	TEP70BS	15	282–296
2017	TEP70BS	19	297–315
2018	TEP70BS	12	316–327
2019	TEP70BS	19	328–346
2020	TEP70BS	5	347–351
2021	TEP70BS	5	352–356
2022	TEP70BS	4	357–360
2023	TEP70BS	4	362–365
2024	TEP70BS	4	361, 366–368
2025	TEP70BS	10	369–378
2026	TEP70BS	5	379–383

== General characteristics ==
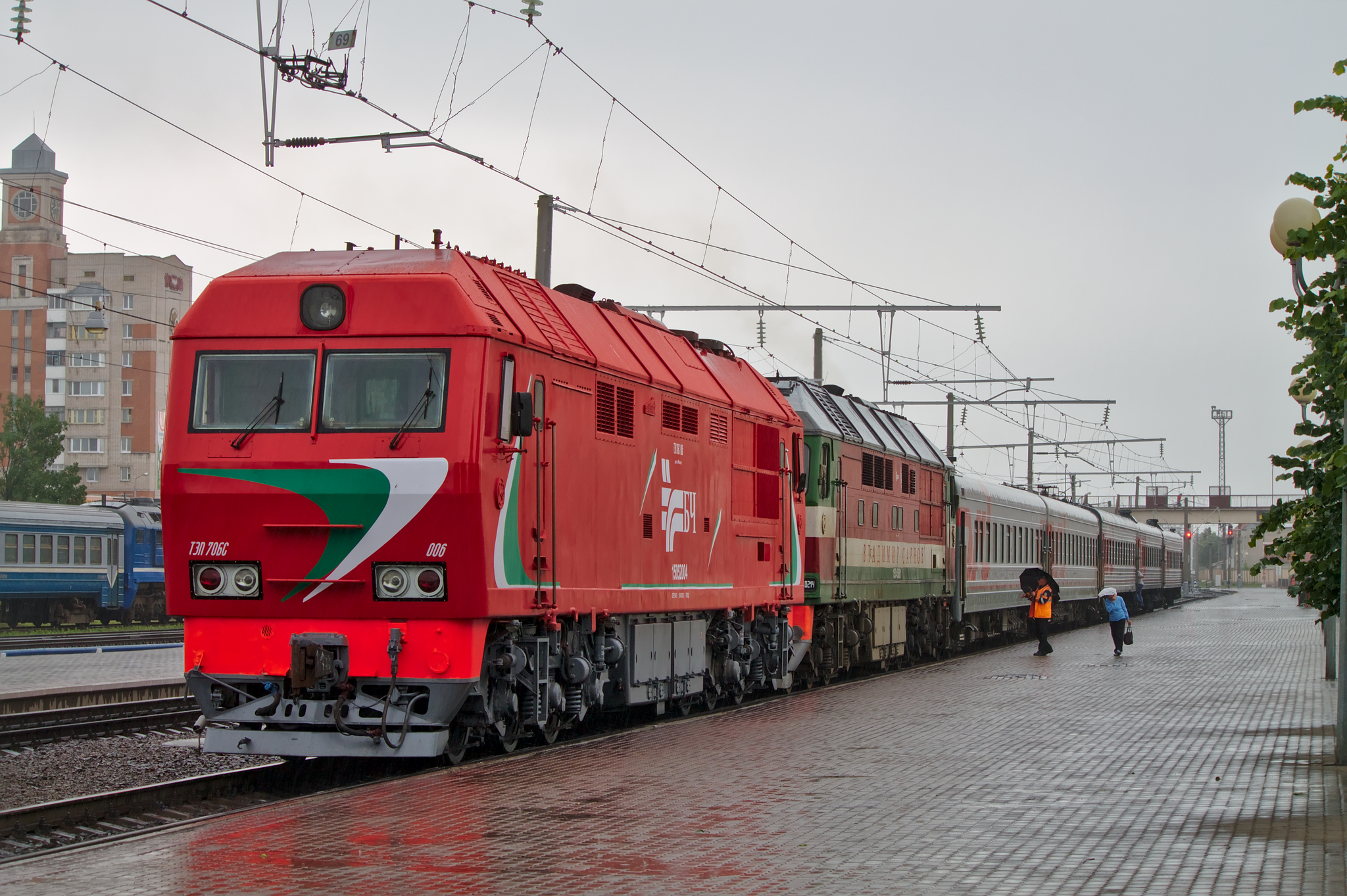
TEP70BS-006 and TEP70-0214 of Belarusian Railways with a passenger train

TEP70 locomotive engine startup. The sound of the oil pump operation and the start of the diesel engine operation.

The TEP70 family of diesel locomotives are single-unit, double cab, six-axle locomotives designed to haul passenger trains on non-electrified railway sections with a track gauge of 1,520 mm (4 ft 11 27/32 in). The modified variant of the TEP70 locomotives are the TEP70BS and TEP70U locomotives. The 2TE70 locomotives are dual-unit locomotives with single-cab units, structurally standardized with the TEP70U and designed to haul heavy freight trains.

The TEP70 locomotives have a diesel engine power of 4,000 hp and were primarily positioned as a replacement for the TEP60 locomotives, which had a 3,000 hp diesel engine, on the most heavily loaded non-electrified routes where the TEP60 locomotives were not powerful enough to haul long trains at a required speed. As of 2017, they are the most common passenger locomotives in Russia and several other Post-Soviet countries. At the same time, the freight variant of the locomotive, the 2TE70, due to its higher cost compared to other freight locomotives, did not go into mass production.

TEP70 locomotives up to serial number 0317 inclusive were designed to be capable of operating under MU (Multiple Unit) control similar to the TEP60, for which purpose the 'B' cab (closer to the grilles) was equipped with multiple control sockets. During measures aimed at reducing costs and simplifying the design of the locomotive in the 1990s, a decision was made to abandon MU operations, due to the fact that the use of two locomotives in traction was quite rare, and where it did occur, the requirement for a third crew member in locomotives connected under MU control nullified its advantages.

=== Technical specifications ===
The main parameters of TEP70 locomotives of various modifications
Parameter		Locomotive model					
Parameter		TEP70 prototype	TEP70 serial	TEP70BS		TEP70U	2TE70
Number of units		1	1	1		1	2
Axial formula		3_{0}—3_{0}					
Dimensions
Overall size		1-Т					
Main dimensions in milimetres	Length along the coupler axles	20 470	21 700				2×21 700
Main dimensions in milimetres	Body width	3086					
Main dimensions in milimetres	Body height from rail level	5080	4975				4990
Main dimensions in milimetres	Height of the coupler axles	1060					
Running gear dimensions in milimetres	Full wheelbase of the unit	15 900	16 850				
Running gear dimensions in milimetres	Bogie wheelbase	4600	4300				
Running gear dimensions in milimetres	Wheel diameter	1220					
Running gear dimensions in milimetres	Track gauge	1520					
Running gear dimensions in milimetres	Minimum curve	125*10^{3}					
Weight
Working weight in tonnes		129±3%	135±3%				2×(141±3%)
Axle load in tonnes		21,5±3%	22,5±3%				23,5±3%
Supplies in kilograms	Fuel	6000	6000	6000		6000	2×7000
Supplies in kilograms	Water	1480	1134	1134		1134	2×?
Supplies in kilograms	Oil	1430	1000	1000		1000	2×?
Supplies in kilograms	Sand	800	600	600		600	2×1000
Traction and power characteristics
Nominal power	Diesel in kilowatts (horsepower)	2942 (4000)	2942 (4000)	2942 (4000)		3000 (4080)	2×3000 (2×4080)
Nominal power	Electric motors in kilowatts	2466 (6×411)	2478 (6×413)	2484 (6×414)		2484 (6×414)	2×2484 (2×6 × 414)
Gear ratio		78 : 25 (3,12)	78 : 25 (3,12)	78 : 25 (3,12)	83 : 20 (4,15)	78 : 25 (3,12)	85 : 18 (4,72)
Thrust force in kilonewtons (tons per force)	When accelerating	280 (28,55)	280 (28,55)	280 (28,55)	373 (38)	280 (28,55)	2×510 (2×52)
Thrust force in kilonewtons (tons per force)	Long-term mode	167 (17)	167 (17)	167 (17)	222 (22,67)	167 (17)	2×304 (2×31)
Speed in kilometres per hour	Long-term mode	50	48	48	37,5	48	26
Speed in kilometres per hour	Design speed	160	160	160	120	160	110
Brake resistor power in kilowatts		—	3200				2×3200

=== Numbering and labeling ===
TEP70 class locomotives were assigned four-digit numbers, starting from 0001. The designation was in the form TEP70-XXXX, where XXXX is the locomotive serial number, and was applied in white letters on black number plates, which were inserted into special numbered glass panels on the front of the cab. On locomotives of the experimental batch, the glazed number plates were positioned at the center of the cab between the headlights. On serial locomotives, starting from number 0008, the central plate was removed, and instead, two glazed number plates were installed at the edges of the cab at an angle to the buffer lights. On the first locomotives, the series designation and number were also applied in the middle of the side walls under the windows in the form of raised text attached to the body; subsequently, this type of designating was no longer applied.

TEP70BS, TEP70U, and 2TE70 locomotives were assigned three-digit numbers starting from 001, with each series having separate numbering. On TEP70BS locomotives, the series designation and number were initially placed above the headlights: when looking at the cab from the left side, the series was indicated above the left set of lights and the number above the right. On the first TEP70BS locomotive, until 2004, when it was designated as TEP70A, the number designation was not present. On TEP70BS locomotives painted in the Russian Railways corporate livery, the series and number designation were moved to the center and displayed as a single inscription in the format TEP70BS-XXX, where XXX is the locomotive serial number. Some locomotives also featured side markings, painted in the center of the side walls near the top under the ventilation grilles.

== Design ==
The TEP70 locomotive is a single-unit, double-cab diesel locomotive. In terms of design, it differs significantly from its predecessor, the TEP60, a fundamentally different body, a three-axle bogie, it does not require special adjustments, and is "dry"; moreover, in terms of ride smoothness, the TEP70 is undoubtedly the leader among domestic locomotives. It also features a class III frame-supported drive (a hollow shaft rigidly connected to the traction motor; the axle of the wheelset passes inside the shaft, and the wheels are connected to the hollow shaft via rubber-metal couplings), but with traction couplings for longitudinal compensation that are not demanding in terms of alignment, instead of transverse ones. The uneconomical two-stroke DN23/30 (11D45) diesel engine (the same as in M62 locomotives, but with an increased number of cylinders and intermediate cooling) was replaced with a four-stroke 5D49. A more modern AC-DC electric transmission was introduced.

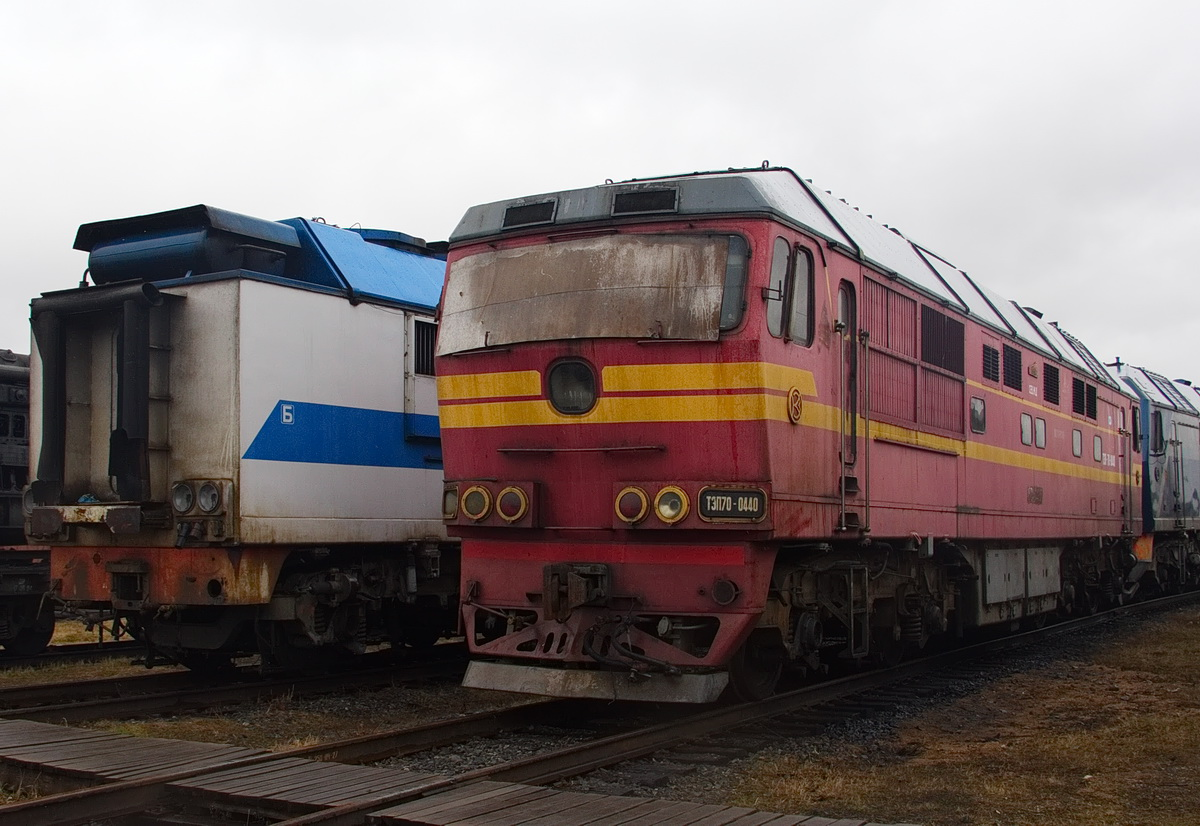
TEP70-0440 of the third series and the back of the 2TE70 locomotive unit

=== Mechanical part ===
==== Body ====
The locomotive body is a load-bearing, truss-brace type, with two control cabs. It is made of low-alloy steel and aluminum alloys for the frame and cladding. Compared to the TEP60 locomotives, the body shape was significantly modified; the cabs and roof were formed from various inclined planes with sharp angles. The mass-to-length ratio decreased from 1030 kg/m to 890 kg/m. The main longitudinal beams of the box-section body are located along the outer contour. In the middle part of the frame, between the bogies, a fuel tank with compartments for batteries is welded to the frame on the underside, suspended in the space between the bogies.

The first 7 locomotives had bodies with a length of 20,470 mm (67 ft 2 in) measured between coupler axes and a height of 50,080 mm (164 ft 4 in) from rails. The body width was 3,086 mm (10 ft 1.5 in). In the serial TEP70 locomotives, the body design underwent a number of changes; the body became longer and slightly lower, and the shape and arrangement of several elements on the front and side walls were altered. The locomotive length increased by 1,230 mm (4 ft 0 in), reaching 21,700 mm (71 ft 2 in), while the height decreased by 105 mm (4.1 in) to 4,975 mm (16 ft 3.9 in). Along with the body, the overall wheelbase of the locomotive also became longer; the distance between the axles of the outermost wheel pairs increased by 950 mm (3 ft 1 in). In the TEP70BS locomotives, the body received a modified exterior, modified arrangement and the design of the windows, grilles, and signaling devices, but the body dimensions remained unchanged compared to the serial TEP70. In the 2TE70 locomotives, instead of a second cab in each unit, extended side walls with an inter-sectional gangway were installed; however, the section length remained unchanged.

===== Front panels =====
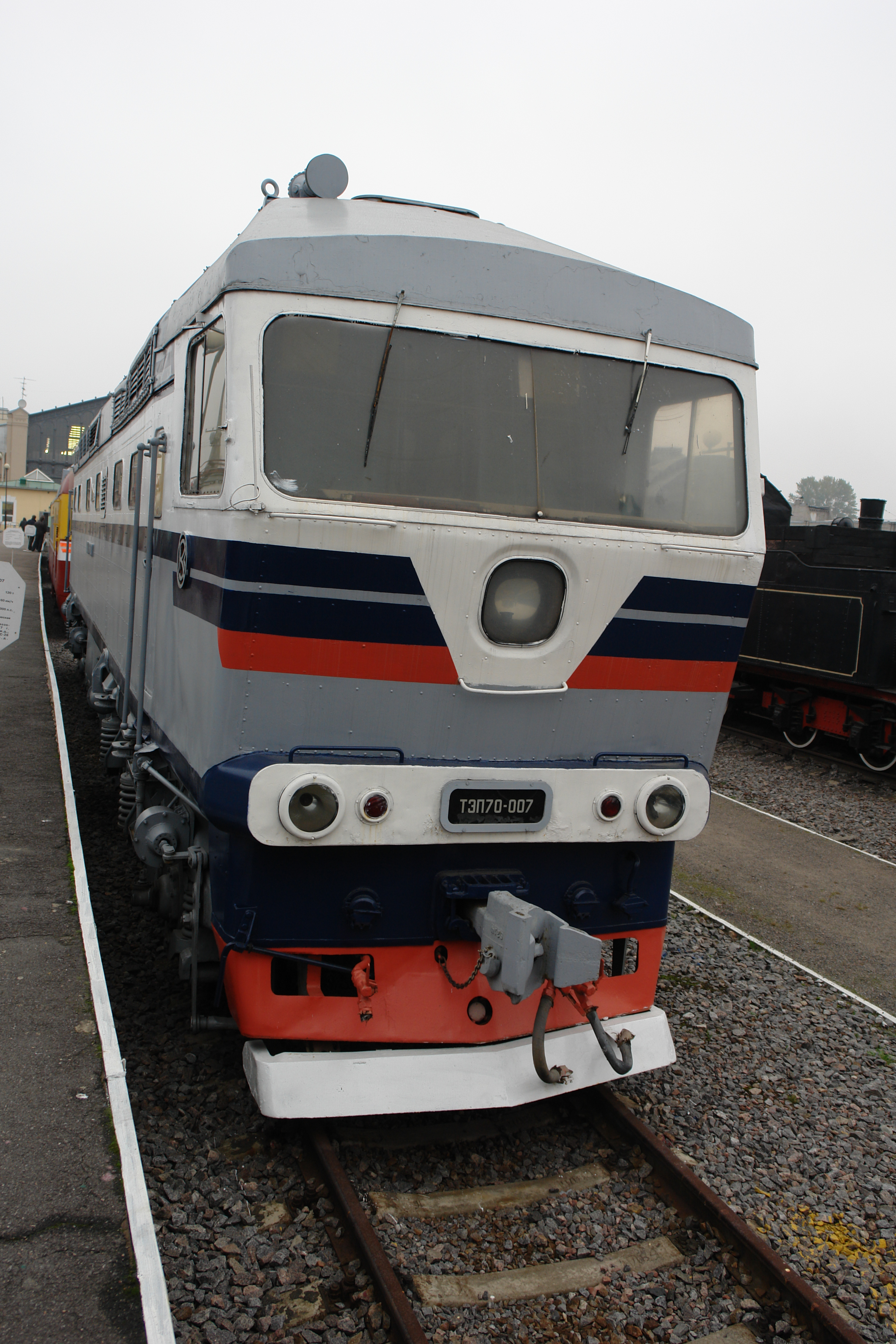
Front panel of the TEP70-0007 locomotive

Front panel of the TEP70BS locomotive

The front side of the locomotive cab consists of two smooth body panels positioned at an angle to each other (the lower one inclined forward, the upper one backward at a smaller angle) and a front panel at the bottom with an integrated automatic coupling and a snowplow.

The upper slanted body panel is almost entirely occupied in both width and height by a window opening with two windshields, through which the locomotive crew has a view of the track. Until the late 1930s, the windshield opening did not have a vertical mullion, although the glass itself consisted of two halves glued together. This design was later abandoned, as after the first winter the seam would crack and the glass would lose its airtight quality, resulting in a mullion being installed between the panes in the middle of the opening.

The lower slanted panel on the front side is approximately twice as tall as the upper one. In its upper part, centered under the windshields, there is a recessed body-mounted square-shaped headlight with rounded corners, while at the bottom, at the level of the frame, there are protruding forward buffer panels with symmetrically arranged buffer lights built into them, two on each side (a white headlight and a red tail light) along with license plates. The buffer lights have round bulbs that protrude forward; their size and arrangement vary among locomotives of different production batches. In the first batch of locomotives (No. 0001–0007), a single panel almost spanning the entire width of the cab was installed, featuring one number plate in the center and horizontally positioned buffer lights; large white ones at the edges and small red ones closer to the center. For second-production locomotives (No. 0008–0185), instead of a single wide panel, two separate panels were installed at the edges, while the number plates were positioned at an angle to the side of the buffer lights, and the red tail lights were placed below the white ones. For third-production locomotives (from No. 0186), the red lights began to be installed beside the white ones toward the center and became the same size as them, resulting in buffer panels that were wider but shorter in height.

On the TEP70BS, TEP70U, and 2TE70 locomotives, the forward-projecting buffer panels with number plates were completely removed, the headlight units were recessed into the body, and the projector lamp was moved from under the front windows to the front slope of the roof above the front windows, with the projector housing slightly protruding from under the slope. As with the third serial TEP70, the white and red lights were of the same size and were arranged horizontally. On the first TEP70BS, TEP70U, and 2TE70 locomotives, halogen headlight lamps recessed inside and covered with protective glass were installed; later, LED lamps began to be installed. Then, lamps of a modified design without external glass and slightly protruding from the body surface began to be installed. The TEP70BS-371 locomotive of the new design features new LED buffer lights with a trapezoidal housing, similar to those used on the leading cars of DP2D trains, and a recessed trapezoidal-shaped headlight. Additionally, red tail lights are installed behind the windshield to indicate the end of the train.

Below the lower inclined wall at the ends of the locomotive, beneath the frame level, there is a vertical front panel that transitions into an inclined snowplow with triangular cutouts. In the center of the upper part of the snowplow are SA3 automatic couplers, the axis of which is at a height of 1,060 mm (3 ft 6 in) above the rails. On either side of them, on TEP70 locomotives up to number 0317, near the cabin closest to the grilles, there are sockets for coupling via CME. Below the automatic coupler, in the cutouts of the snowplow, are the pneumatic line hoses. On TEP70BS locomotives, on the lower front panel on the left side (right side when facing the locomotive), next to the automatic coupler, there are train power supply sockets.

Instead of one of the cabs (on the side of the grilles), the 2TE70 locomotives have a straight end wall with an inter-unit gangway in the form of bellows soufflé with a transition platform.

===== Side panels =====
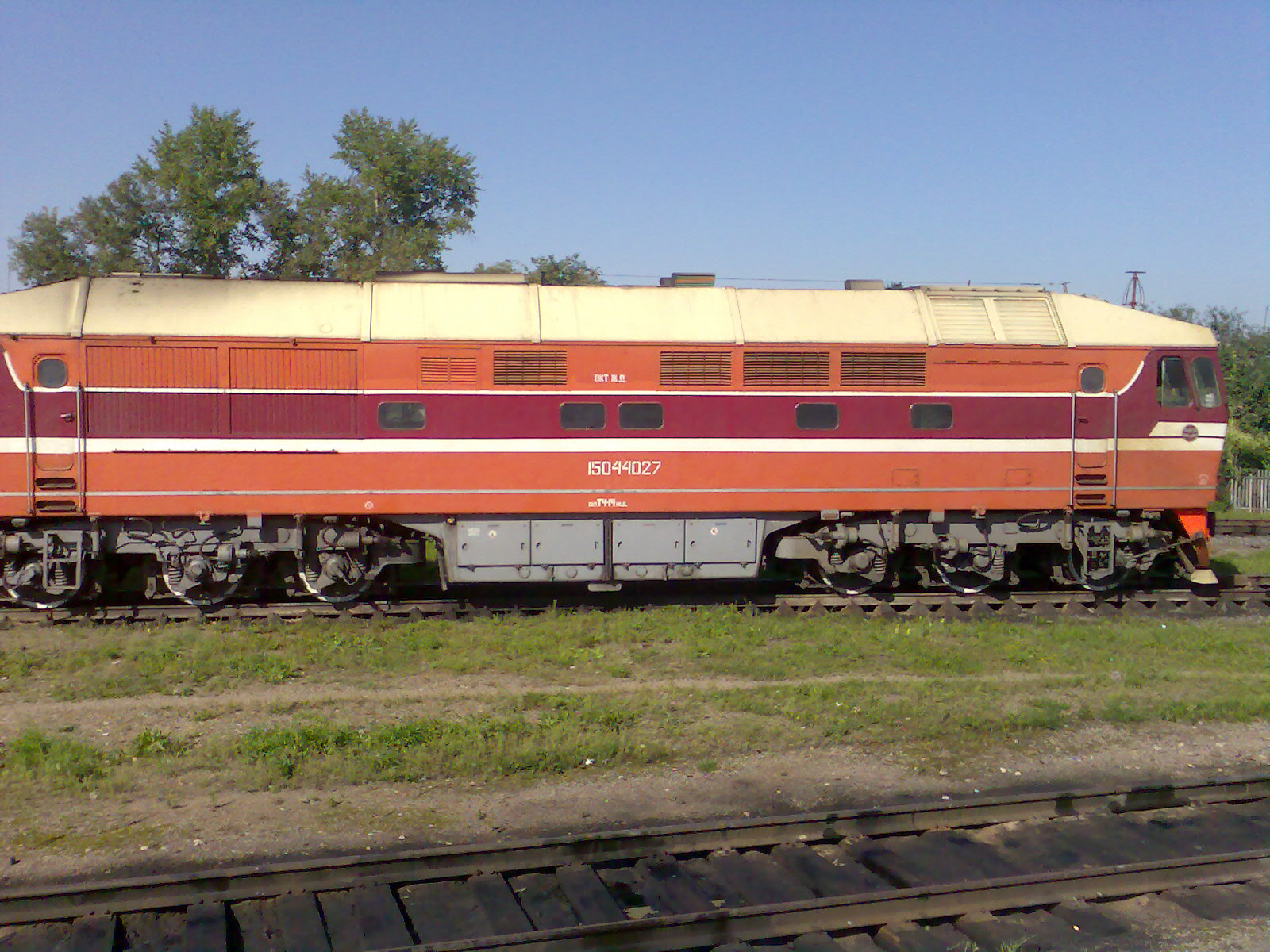
Side view of TEP70-0402 locomotive

Side view of TEP70BS-185 locomotive

The side panels of the locomotive are smooth and vertical. On both sides of the driver's cab, there are windows with slanted front sections. The side windows of the TEP70 cab are divided into two parts, with the rear part capable of opening by sliding the glass forward. In the first seven locomotives of the prototype batch, the opening and fixed glass were separated by a vertical rubber seal; in the serial production, a rigid metal slanted dividing strip was introduced. For the TEP70BS-001, 059 locomotives, and starting from 063, the side windows of the driver's cab also consist of two parts; a fixed front part and an opening rear part, whereas on TEP70BS units numbered 002–062 (except 059), TEP70U, and 2TE70, only the rear opening half is retained. Behind the windows on both sides are single-leaf hinged doors for the locomotive crew to enter. The door leaves are equipped with glass. To allow the crew to rise from the embankment level to the doors, vertical side ladders are installed under the doors.

In the space between the entrance doors in the side panels, there are windows and ventilation grilles of the engine compartment, the design of which changed during production. For example, the first seven prototype locomotives had six panes on each side, arranged in groups of two symmetrically relative to both cabs. On serial locomotives, the windows were moved down and reduced to only five, above which, as well as on the side of cab B (closer to the cooling system ventilation units), ventilation grilles appeared. With the start of production of the TEP70BS locomotives, the first one retained only three windows, and starting from the second locomotive, all windows in the engine compartment were completely removed. The arrangement of the ventilation grilles, however, did not change.

==== Bogies ====
The locomotive has two Co-Co traction bogies without side frames. The bogies feature a two-stage spring suspension: in the first (axle box) stage, the bogie frame rests on the axle boxes of the wheelsets, and in the second (body) stage, the body rests on the frames of the two bogies. The wheel diameter at the running circle is 1,220 mm (4 ft 0 in).

===== Prototype locomotive bogies =====
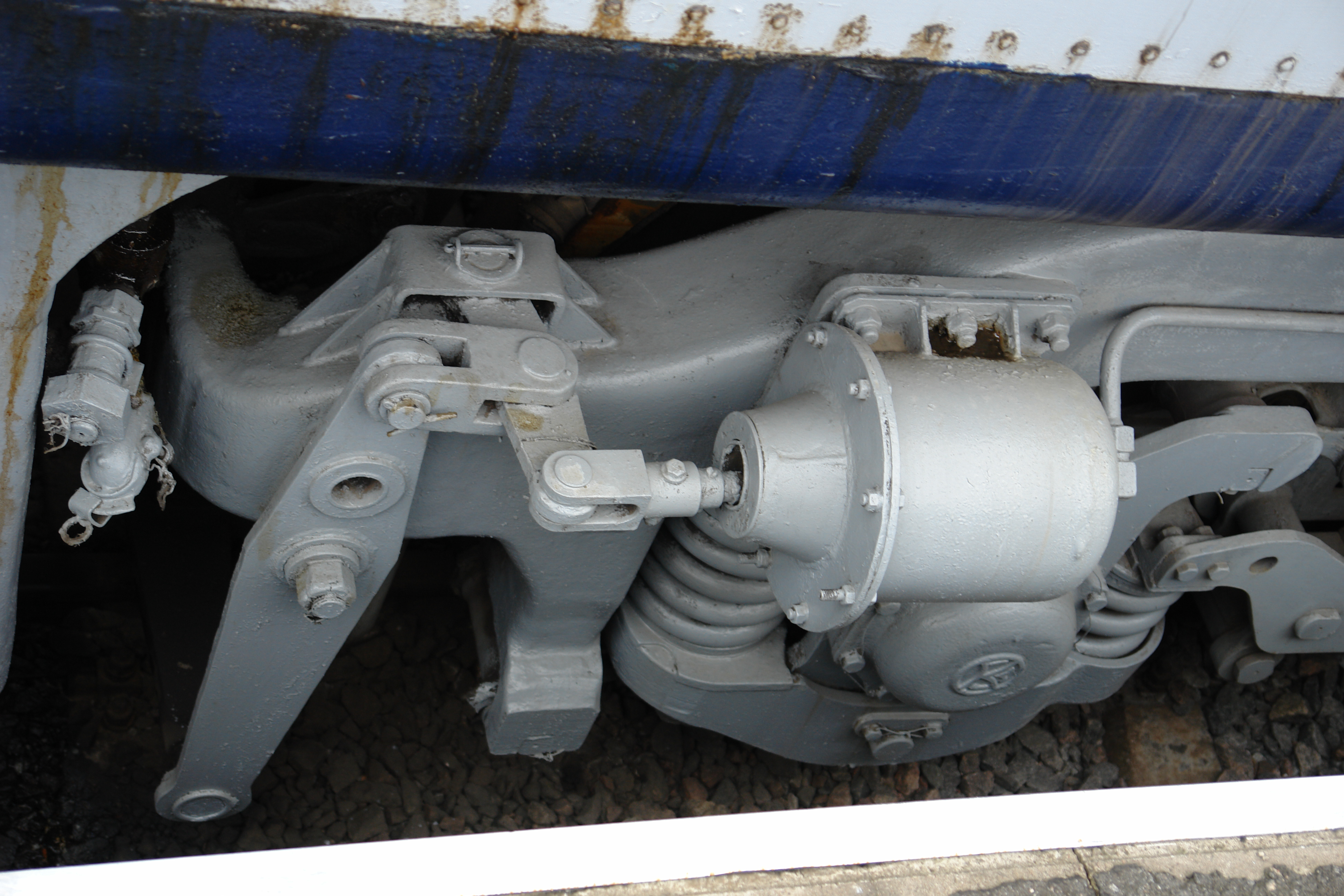
Bushing and brake cylinder of the TEP70-0007 locomotive bogie

The bogies of the first seven locomotives are largely similar in design to the TEP60 bogies and differ from them mainly in their greater length, which is due to the increased wheel diameter compared to their predecessors. The frames of these bogies are welded from stamped elements. The length of the bogie frame increased by 200 mm (7.9 in); however, the distances between the axles of the wheelsets remained the same: 2,400 mm (7 ft 10 in) between the axles of the front and middle wheelsets, 2,200 mm (7 ft 3 in) between the axles of the middle and rear wheelsets, with a total wheelbase of 4,600 mm (15 ft 1 in).

In the second stage of the suspension, the load from the body onto the bogie frame is transmitted through two main swing supports located in the middle of the kingpin beams and four spring side supports installed on brackets welded to the sides of the bogie frame on the outside in the zones between the axles. The load on each main support is approximately 95,500 N, and the deflection of a single rubber cone under load is about 15 mm (0.59 in). The load on each side support is half that of the main support. The static deflection of the side springs under this load, to compensate for lateral rocking, is 98 mm (3.9 in). The stability of the body in the transverse direction is provided by spring return devices installed between the lugs of the main supports and the body.

In the first stage of the suspension, the load from the frame of the bogie is transmitted to the wheelsets through end and middle cylindrical springs and leaf springs, balanced with each other. The end springs and leaf springs absorb the load through rubber dampers: ring-shaped above the springs and rectangular above the spring clamp. Through spring balancers, the leaf springs load the adjacent springs, installed in the seats of the double-arm under-axle balancers, which in turn are suspended by shafts on the axlebox housings and transmit the load to them. The second ends of the balancers of the end axleboxes are loaded with end springs. The static deflection of the cylindrical springs and leaf springs amounts to 94 mm (3.7 in).

Electric traction motors have a frame-supported suspension and are arranged in the same way as in a jaw bogie: two geared in one direction, the third in the opposite direction. The traction torque from the motor to the wheelsets is transmitted through a gearbox with a special mechanism that simultaneously compensates for vertical movements of the motor relative to the wheelset axis. The gear ratio of the gearbox is 78:25 = 3.12.

Traction and braking forces from the wheelsets to the car body frame and the automatic coupler are transmitted through journal boxes connected to the bogie frame by journal box levers with rubber elements. The pins of the levers are fixed in special wedge-shaped grooves of the journal box housings and the brackets of the bogie frame. From the bogie frame, the traction force is transmitted through special hardened keys on the main support posts to the car body, and then to the automatic coupler.

The bogies' braking equipment includes four brake cylinders with a diameter of 254 mm (10.0 in) (10"), each of which, through a lever transmission system, acts on three brake pads, that is on two brake pads of one wheel and on one pad of an adjacent wheel. The lever brake transmission allows for the installation of cast iron or composite pads. During manual braking, the pads are applied to the front wheelset on both sides and to the adjacent wheelset on one side.

===== Serial locomotive bogies =====
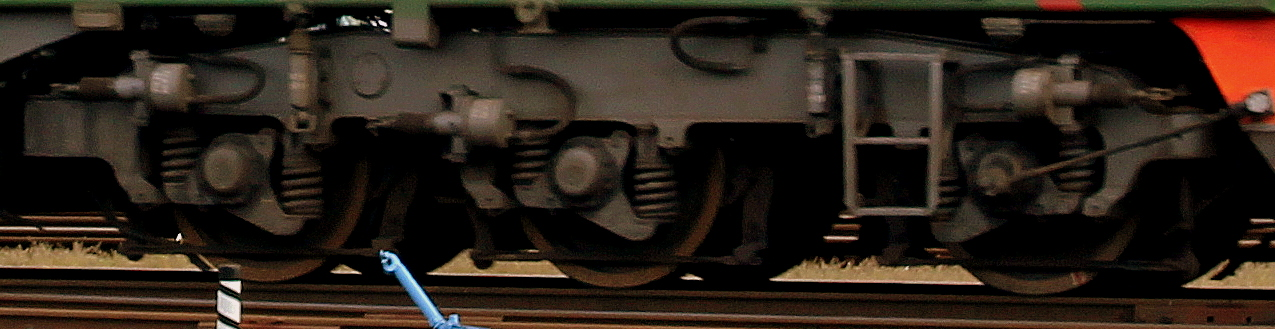
Side view of the serial TEP70 locomotive bogie

On serial TEP70 locomotives, from designation number 0008, bogies of a modified design began to be used. The bogie frame has a welded structure and differs somewhat in execution, and the suspension design was changed. The distance between the axles of the wheel sets of the bogie was also reduced; between the front and middle axles it is 2,300 mm (7 ft 7 in), between the middle and rear axles; 2,000 mm (6 ft 7 in), with the total wheelbase being 4,300 mm (14 ft 1 in).

In the second stage of the suspension, the load from the car body is transmitted to the bogie frame through eight cylindrical springs mounted on the sides of the bogie frame (four on each side) instead of rubber central mounts and spring side supports with friction surfaces. The springs of the second stage suspension simultaneously provide elastic connection during transverse and angular movements of the bogie relative to the car body. The static deflection of the springs is 113 mm (4.4 in). In the first stage of the suspension, the load from the bogie frame to the wheelsets is transmitted through individually suspended springs, instead of leaf springs, with a spring deflection of 57 mm (2.2 in), which is twice less than in the second stage. Due to the increase in the overall static deflection of the spring suspension from 104 to 170 mm (4.1 in to 6.7 in), in order to maintain the damping properties of the suspension that were provided on the first locomotives by leaf springs, hydraulic shock absorbers have been installed on the new locomotives in the second stage: two vertical and one horizontal on each side. In the first stage, shock absorbers are absent.

Relative movements of the bogie and the body in the transverse direction are possible due to the elastic kingpin device. The maximum displacement of the kingpin in this direction is 60 mm (2.4 in), of which 30 mm (1.2 in) corresponds to free play and 30 mm to elastic travel with compression of the kingpin device spring. The engagement of the kingpin device spring when the body deflects beyond 30 mm allows ensuring a nonlinear dependence of the restoring force on the displacement.

Traction electric motors have a frame-supported suspension and are placed in a single direction behind the axles of the wheel sets, one after another. The wheel set drive is one-sided. Torque from the motor shaft to the wheel set is transmitted via a gearbox that includes a gear drive, links with rubber-metal hinges, and a tube with two drive flanges at the ends. The gear ratio of the gearbox has remained unchanged.

The tractive and braking forces from the wheelsets to the locomotive frame and the automatic coupling are transmitted through journal boxes, connected to the bogie frame by journal box levers with rubber elements, as in the bogies of prototype diesel locomotives. From the bogie frame, the tractive effort is transmitted to the locomotive frame through a kingpin lowered to the level of the wheelset axles.

The bogie braking system includes six brake cylinders with built-in rod stroke regulators instead of four, individual lever transmissions providing bidirectional brake block application, and notched brake blocks. During manual braking, the brake blocks press against the tires of only one wheelset.

The bogies of the TEP70BS, TEP70U, and 2TE70 locomotives have received a number of improvements. In particular, hydraulic shock absorbers were applied in both suspension stages, which reduce the vertical dynamics coefficient of the axle stage by 25%. The total static deflection is less than 160 mm (6.3 in). The design of the traction motor support-frame suspension units has been improved, eliminating the need for hydraulic tightening of the fasteners. The horizontal hydraulic shock absorbers have been relocated from under the body to a position convenient for maintenance.

=== Interior ===
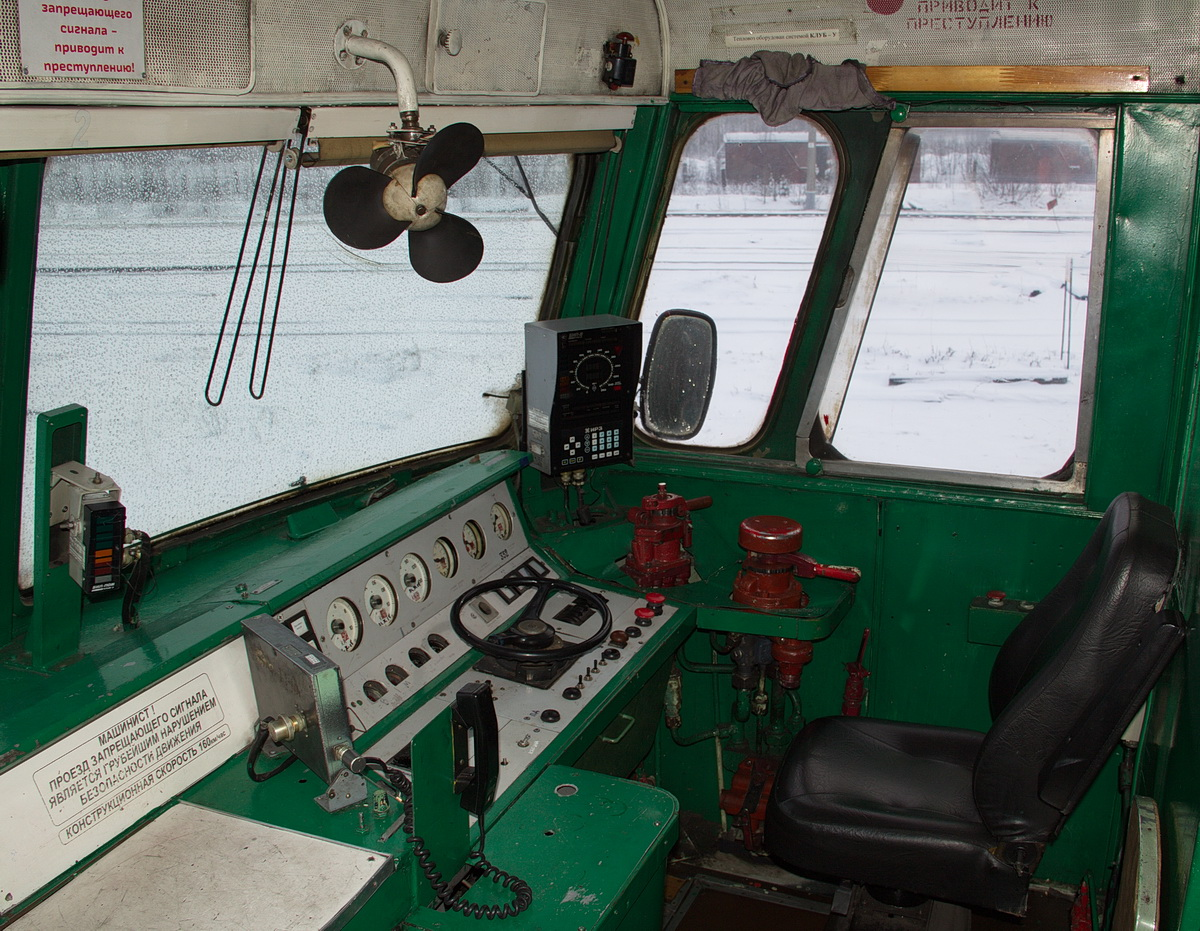
General view of the TEP70 locomotive cab from the right side (driver's position)

==== Driver's cab ====
The locomotive cab is designed for the operation of the locomotive by a two-person crew; a driver and an assistant. In terms of design, it differs significantly from the TEP60 cab. The hand brake is located on the rear wall of the cab, allowing for a single, desk-like control panel, with a protrusion in the middle that houses the headlight box. On the right side of the cab is the driver's control panel and seat, and on the left is the assistant's seat.

The control panel of the TEP70 locomotive engineer consists of two flat gray panels; a horizontal one with the controller and main switches in front of the engineer, and an inclined panel at the front of the cab, on which there are dial measuring instruments, signal lamps, and a number of switches. The engineer's control stand has a steering-type handle and is located centrally directly in front of the engineer, allowing it to be operated with both hands. On TEP70-0220 locomotive, a combined engineer's control stand of the KM-2202 type was installed instead of two controllers: the train controller KV-1554 and the electric brake controller KV-0551. On the left side of the control panel is the radio station. Directly in front of the controller on the inclined panel are installed (from left to right): the traction current ammeter, the EDT ammeter, the EDT speed setpoint indicator (absent in later units), the brake cylinder pressure gauge, the brake and supply line pressure gauge, and the equalizing reservoir pressure gauge. Below, on the left, there are 2 sets of instruments for monitoring diesel, water and oil (thermometers and pressure gauges). The TEP70-0515 locomotive is equipped with a switch for selecting water temperature readings for the hot and cold circuits. The activation of the field weakening stages can be carried out in both automatic and manual modes, for which switches are provided on the control panel. Manual control of field weakening allows selecting the most economical train operation mode, as the efficiency of electric machines depends on voltage and current. To the right of the control panel are the pneumatic brake valves, units numbered 0395 and 0254, and on the corner between the front and side windows, an Integrated Train Protection System (KLUB) indicator unit is installed. Previously, speedometers 3SL2M and KPD-3 were installed. Some switches and instruments (including the traction voltmeter) are located on the assistant driver's control panel. From number 0272, the factory installs a second set of type 42RTM; 4M radio stations.

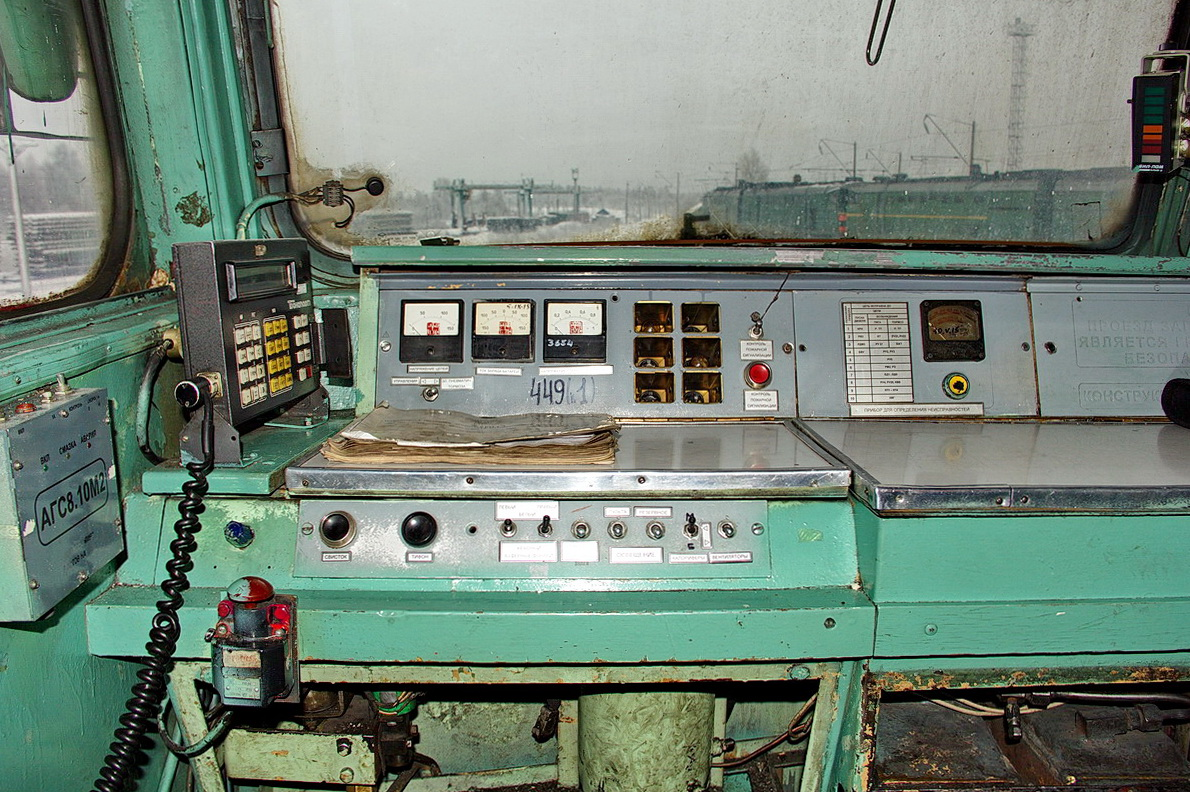
Assistant driver's control panel of the TEP70 locomotive

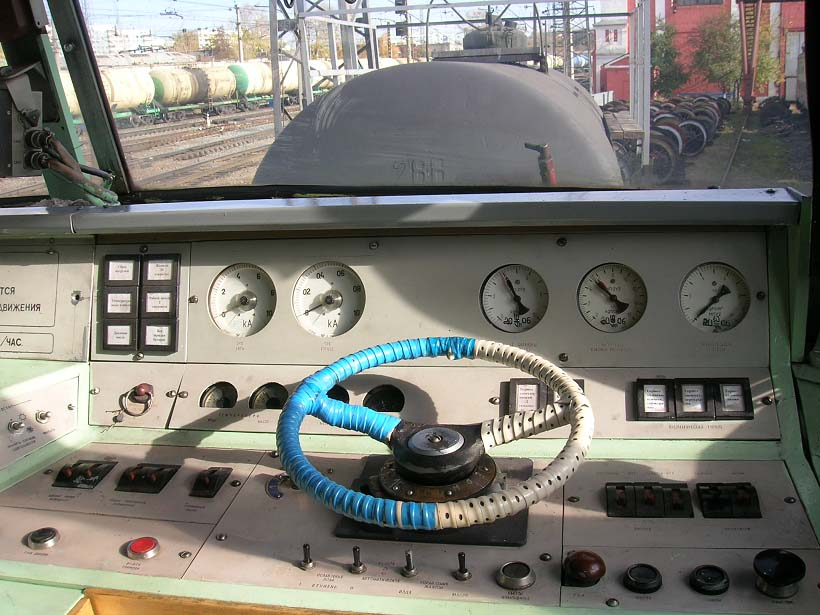
Driver's control panel of the TEP70 locomotive

The control panel of the TEP70BS, TEP70U, and 2TE70 locomotives underwent significant changes in design and equipment; it became wider in size and acquired a concave arched edge in front of the driver. In the inclined rear part of the panel, on the left side and in the center, a digital display of the microprocessor-based control and diagnostic system was installed, providing the driver with information about the locomotive's condition and its parameters; in the center, a wide display of the KLUB system, visualizing the texts of the locomotive signaling and speedometer, with a panel of switches located on its right side; on the right, two dual-needle pneumatic system pressure gauges: a brake and feed line pressure gauge and a pressure gauge for the brake cylinders of the first and second bogies. In the horizontal part of the control panel, switches are installed, arranged, like the panel itself, in an arched layout. The driver's control stand is located on the left side of the control panel, to the right of the radio station, and instead of a control wheel, it is designed as a compact handle that rotates forward and backward in the vertical plane. Compared to the TEP70BS, the control panel of the dual-unit 2TE70 has two additional buttons for the diesel engine of the second unit. For comfortable working conditions, the driver's cab has been equipped with an air conditioning, ventilation, and heating system.

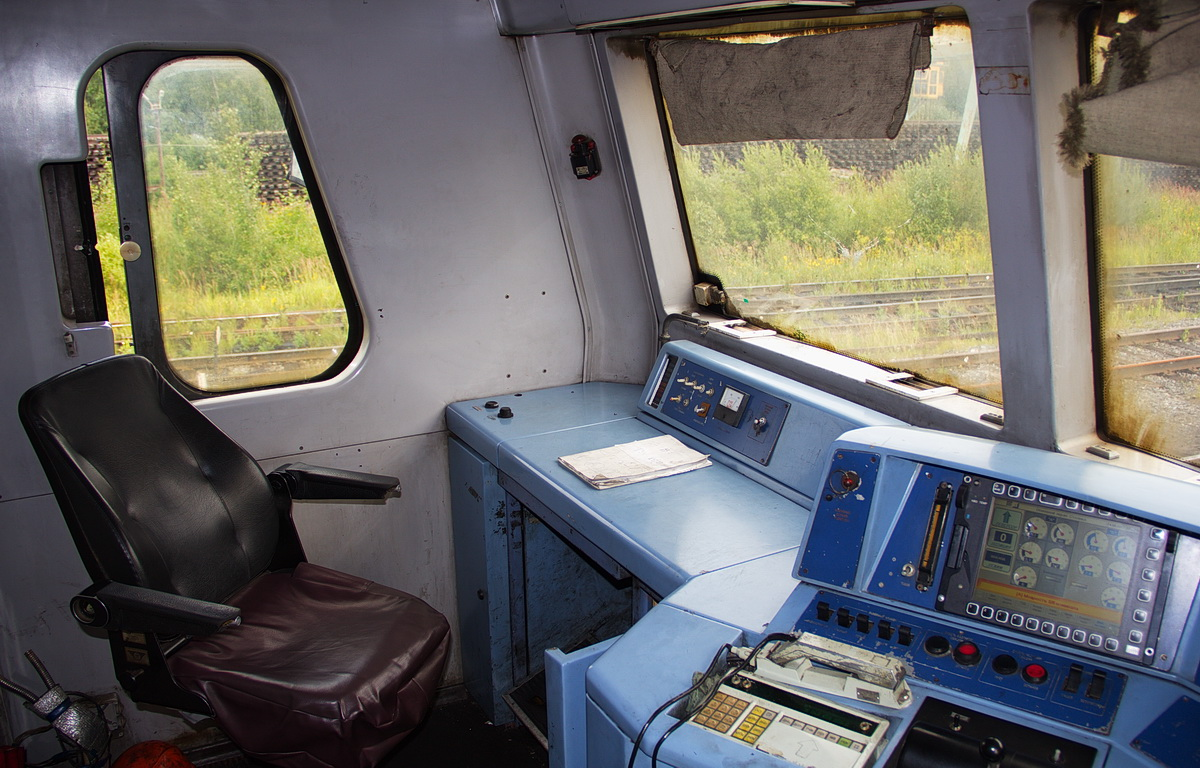
Control panel and assistant driver's seat of the 2TE70 (left side of the cab)

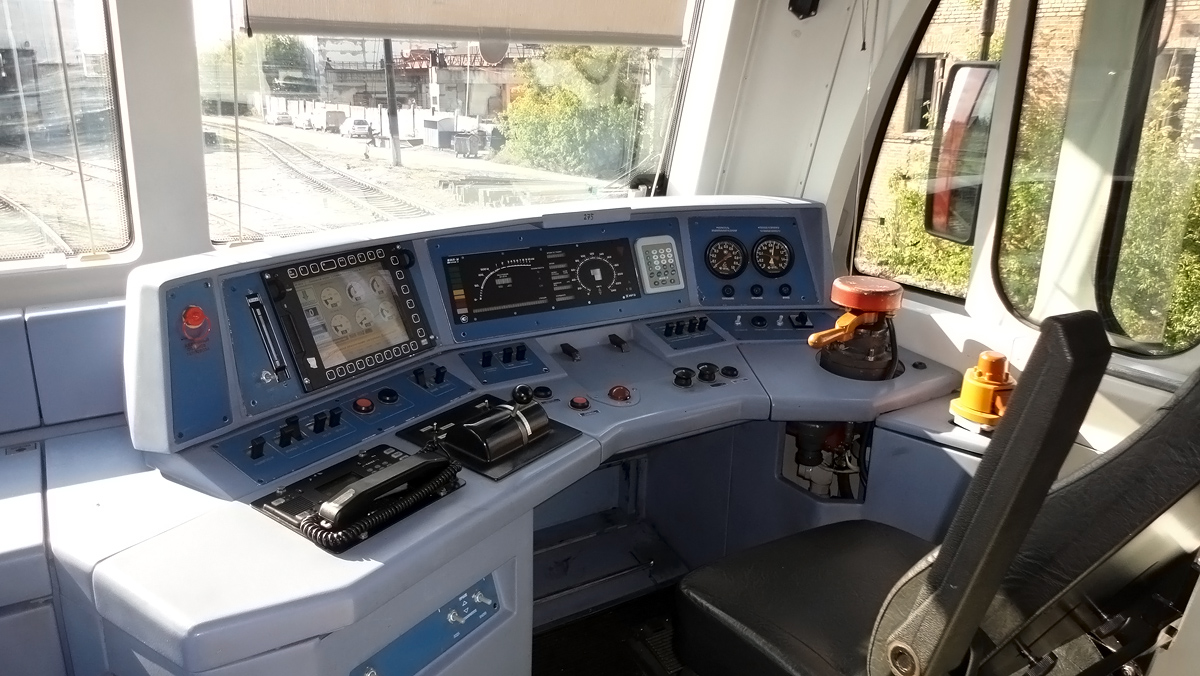
TEP70BS control panel (right side of the cab)

==== Engine compartment ====
Interior of the cabs and engine compartment of the TEP70BS locomotive

The engine room is rather spacious; the high-voltage chamber, located behind the first cab, has gangways on both sides. Behind it are the control units (VU) and auxiliary switchboards (UVV), followed by the central control system (CVS), and behind the CVS is the traction generator and the diesel engine. At the other end of the diesel engine, pumps and hydraulic pumps are installed. In the refrigerator shaft, there are a motor-compressor, oil filters, a fire foam generator, and the diesel engine's oil pump. The air drawn by the diesel from both sides of the locomotive through the louvers located under the roof passes through octagonal mesh cassettes, the lower halves of which are immersed in oil baths, while air passes through the upper halves. A pneumatic drive is provided to moisten the cassettes, rotating them 45 degrees in one stroke. The automatic operation of the drive is arranged quite originally, it activates each time the motor-compressor is switched on.

=== Powertrain and electric transmission ===
The design of the powertrain and electrical transmission is the same used in the 2TE116 and TEM7 locomotives, the 5D49 diesel engine drives two oil pumps (first and second stages), two water pumps (for the first circuit, cooling the diesel, and for the second circuit, cooling the diesel oil and the charge air), two auxiliary electric machines (a commutator starter-generator and a single-phase synchronous exciter), and drives through a flexible coupling, a traction synchronous generator (SG), which has two three-phase star windings on the stator, shifted relative to each other by 30 electrical degrees, which halves the pulsations of the rectified current in the traction motor circuits. Current from the control circuit (110 V voltage generated by the starter-generator) is supplied to the exciter rotor; the alternating current generated by the exciter is rectified by a controlled excitation rectifier (CER) (the CER is assembled from thyristors and allows voltage adjustment during rectification, controlled by the excitation control unit) and is supplied to the SG rotor.

The alternating voltage generated by the generator is rectified in the rectifier unit (RU), assembled from diodes, and through the train contactors it is supplied to six traction motors connected in parallel. The power circuit also includes a pneumatic reverser and two field weakening contactors, allowing for two levels of excitation weakening. The reverser is operated by the driver, while the field weakening contactors are actuated both automatically via transition relays (each for its own level), which monitor the traction motor current and voltage, and manually. The excitation control system is electronic, monitoring the traction generator current and voltage, the diesel engine load using an inductive sensor installed in the diesel regulator, and other parameters.

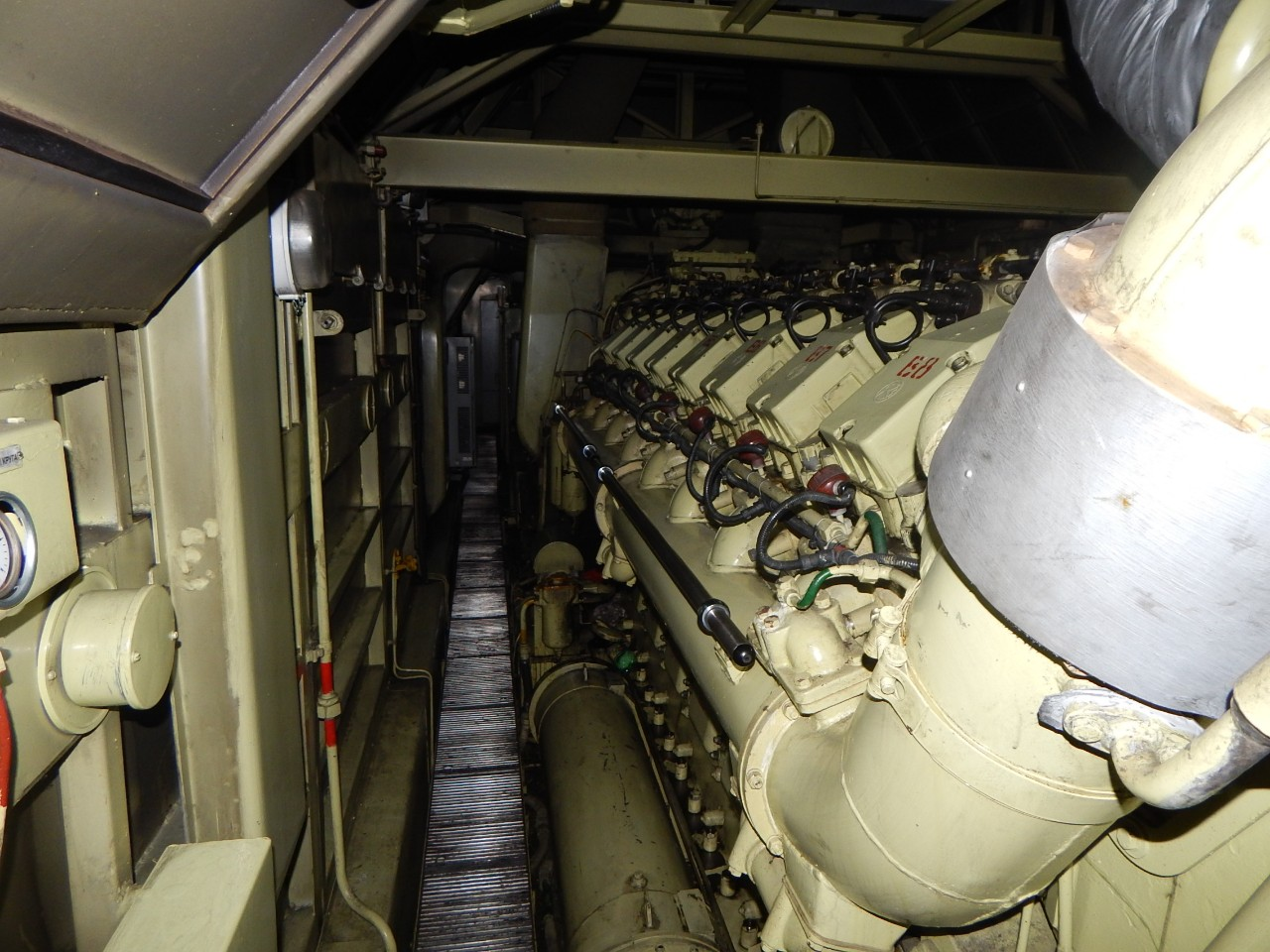
TEP70BS locomotive diesel engine

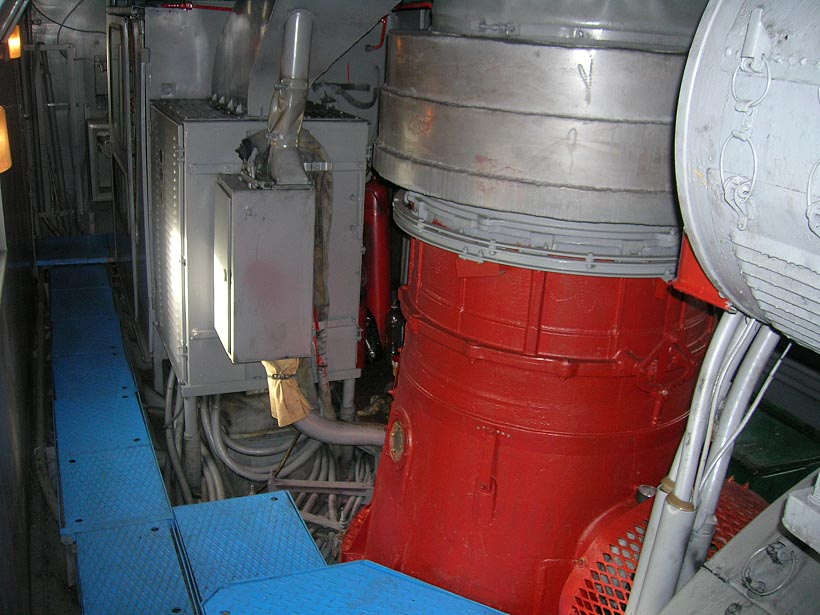
Electrical traction equipment and HVAC installation of the TEP70 locomotive

=== Auxiliary equipment ===
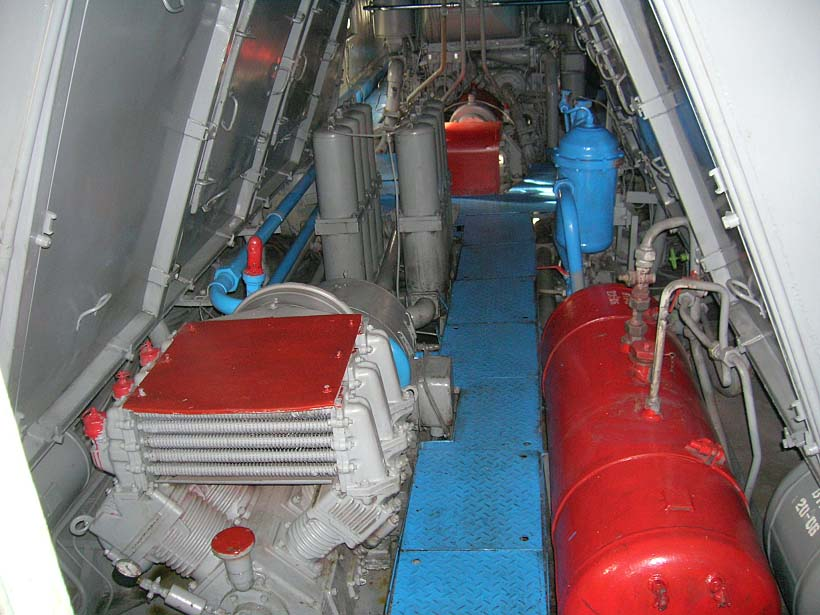
View from the cab into the refrigerator shaft in the TEP70 locomotive

The diesel locomotive has four auxiliary machines: the central air supply (CAS) unit, a motor-compressor, and two refrigerator fans. The CAS is a highly efficient axial fan with fixed blade guide and straightening apparatus, supplying air to all six traction motors, the main generator, the traction drive, and the auxiliary equipment. The PK-5.25 motor-compressor, with a nominal speed of 1450 rpm and a capacity of 5.25 m³/min, which is also installed on the industrial modification of the TEM7 locomotive, the shunter locomotive TGM6, and the Ukrainian electric locomotive DE1, is equipped on the TEP70 with an electric drive from a commutator motor. This engine is powered by a starter-generator with a DC voltage of 110 V. The diesel water is cooled in a radiator, blown by two fans, which are driven by nine-cylinder axial-piston hydraulic motors, supplied with low-viscosity oil under a pressure of up to 220 kg/cm². This pressure is generated by two hydraulic pumps driven by the diesel engine. This hydrostatic drive system is borrowed from the TEP60 locomotive.

== Service ==
=== Prototype TEP70 ===
TEP70-0005 prototype locomotive at Kolomna Locomotive Works in 1976

Prototype TEP70 locomotives of the first type were delivered to the Orsha depot of the Belarusian Railway and operated passenger trains on the Orsha–Gomel, Orsha–Novosokolniki, Orsha–Ovruch, and Orsha–Brest sections. At the same time, they consumed 10-12% less fuel compared to TEP60 locomotives. The TEP70-0005 locomotive also underwent thermal engineering tests at the VNIIZhT test ring and dynamic tests on the Belorechensk–Maykop section of the North Caucasus Railway. Due to significant differences from serial machines, which complicated maintenance, the locomotives operated with passenger trains for a comparatively short period until 1982, after which they were withdrawn from service.

Subsequently, locomotive numbered 0001 was sold in 1986 to the Lubny Paint and Varnish Factory (Southern Railway), where it was used as a power station, while locomotives numbered 0004–0007 were transferred to the October Railway to the Reshetnikovo (OPMS-1) and Gory (PMS-28) track machine stations for hauling maintenance trains, where they were not subjected to high operational loads. In the 1990s, all locomotives numbered 0001–0006 were withdrawn and scrapped. Locomotive numbered 0007 was transferred to the October Railway Museum in Saint Petersburg, where it was preserved for static display.

=== Serial TEP70 ===
TEP70 locomotives of serial production near Vitebsky station in 2012

The first batch of serial TEP70 locomotives of the second type (0008-0032) was delivered to the Central Asian Railway (Uzbekistan) at the Tashkent depot. Some of the machines from the Central Asian Railway were transferred in the late 1980s to early 1990s to the track machine stations of the October Railway and to the Southern Railway, where subsequent locomotives were sent. Of the locomotives transferred to the October Railway, nothing remains at present (except for the cab of TEP70-0183, borrowed from TEP70-0023); some individual locomotives of the Southern Railway are still in service. The very first locomotive of the second series was preserved and transferred to the Tashkent Museum of Railway Equipment.

Then, the second batch of locomotives, starting with 0033, were primarily delivered to the October Railway (Russia) and the Southern Railway (Ukraine). Subsequently, some of these locomotives were transferred to other depots in Russia and Ukraine. Separate small batches of TEP70 locomotives from the second batch were sent to Kazakhstan to the Alma-Ata depot.

Starting with locomotives numbered from 0180, practically simultaneously with the beginning of the production of third-type locomotives, the locomotives also began to be delivered to many other railways of Russia and the countries of the former USSR. The majority of the TEP70 locomotives were intended for Russia. A significant portion of the TEP70 locomotives went to Belarus (mainly locomotives numbered from 200 and 300, with some from 400) and Latvia (from 200); small batches of locomotives numbered from 300 were delivered to Lithuania and Estonia, while those numbered from 190 went to Kazakhstan.

==== Russia ====
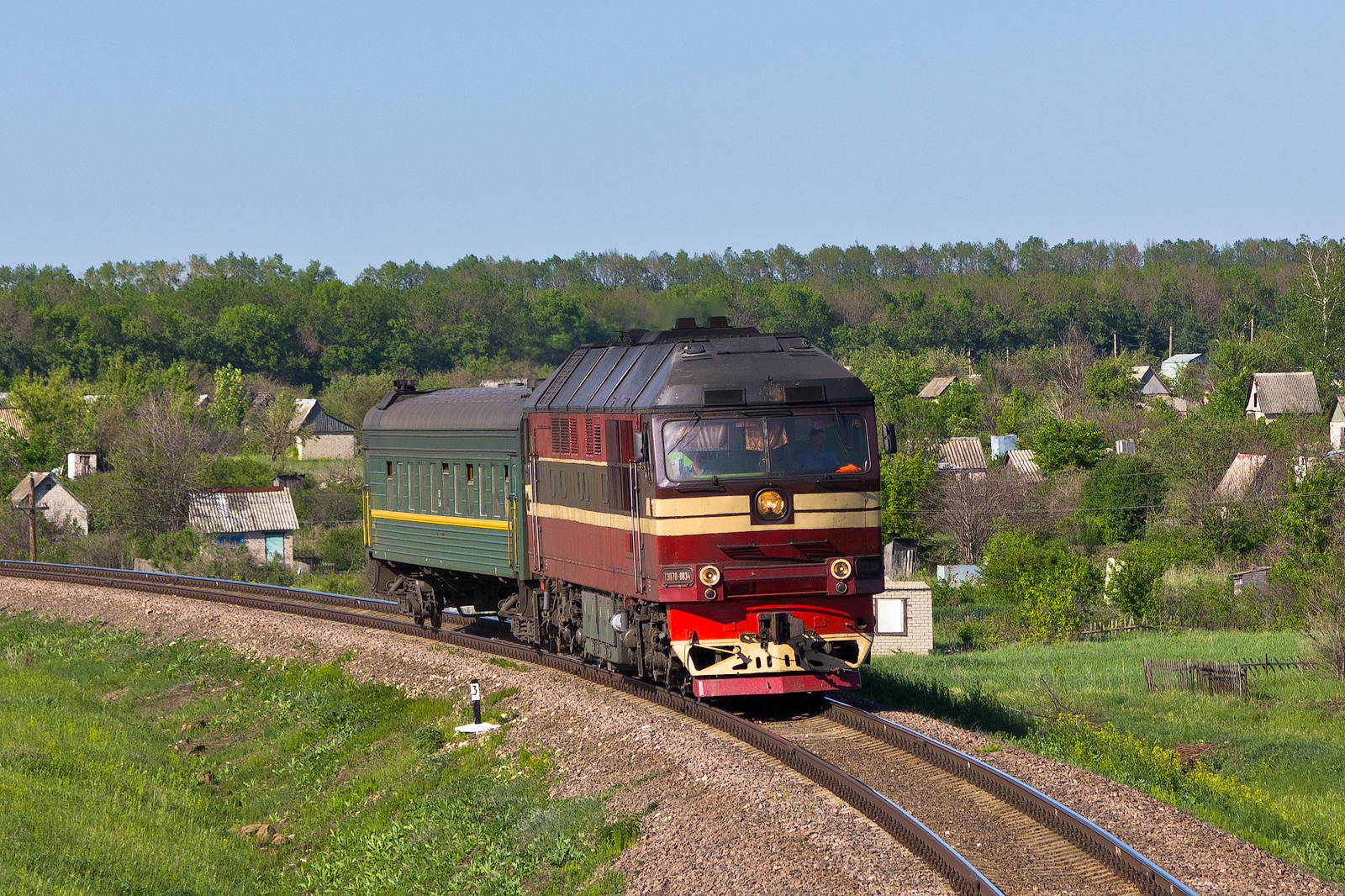
TEP70-0034 was the oldest locomotive of the series in service in Russia until 2020. Built in 1985.

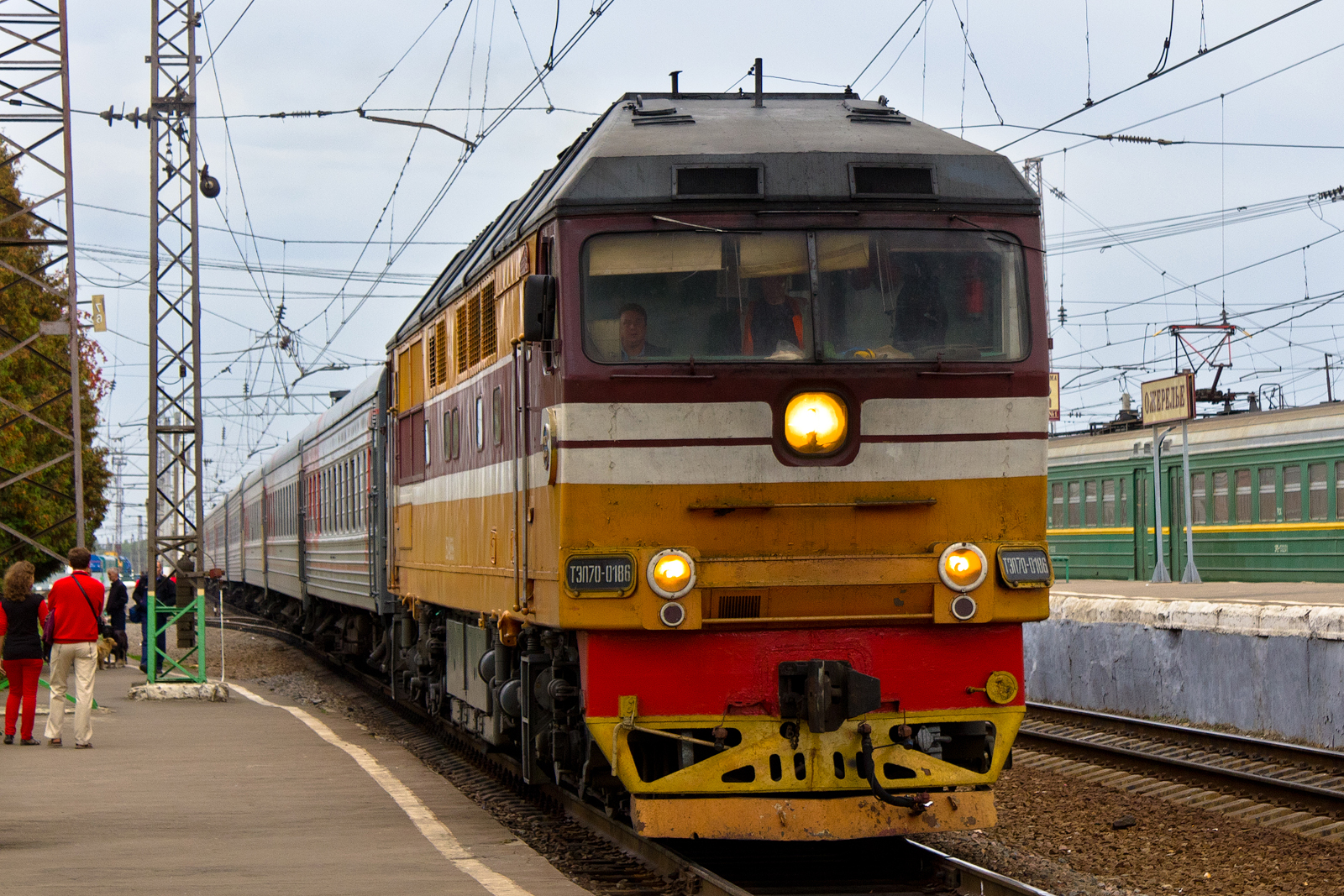
TEP70-0186 (currently 0070). The first diesel locomotive of the third type numbered 0186 was destroyed in a crash near Tambov. Now a diesel locomotive of the second type operates under this number.

The humming TEP70-0183 with an express train

Most of the TEP70 locomotives of all series were delivered to the territory of Russia (initially — the RSFSR as part of the USSR). Locomotives were supplied from the factory starting from 0033.

In the late 1980s, part of the diesel locomotives from Tashkent was transferred to the ownership of the PMS of the October Railway in the RSFSR, and in the 1990s, some of the diesel locomotives of the Southern Railway (Numbered 0085, 0159, 0169, 0176–0181) were transferred to Russia, which were delivered to the Stary Oskol depot, and later — partially transferred to the Yelets depot of the Southeast Railway and other depots. Additionally, four units — TEP70-0042, 0531, 0533, and 0539 — were transferred to the South Ural Railway at the Orenburg depot for commissioning, but the depot staff encountered significant difficulties, as there had previously been no locomotives on the railway with components such as the D49 diesel engine, hydrostatic fan drive, or domestic 110-volt electrical equipment. Later, these locomotives were transferred to the Kotlas depot. At the Velikiye Luki depot, TEP70-0119, 0262, and 0270 are operated, while at the SPB-Varshavsky depot (today SPB-Vitebsky in Shushary) — TEP70-0316, TEP70-0272 (formerly TEP70-0220).

Initially, the TEP70 locomotives numbered from 0 and 100 were delivered only to the October Railway at the Leningrad-Varshavsky depot, and later to the Bologoe and Velikiye Luki depots. Subsequently, the geographical distribution of the TEP70 expanded significantly, and they began to spread throughout Russia, replacing TE10 and M62 freight locomotives used in passenger traffic and gradually displacing the TEP60. Some of the locomotives from the October Railway were later transferred to others.

As of 2017, TEP70 locomotives can be found on almost all railways of the Russian Federation — October Railway (St. Petersburg-Varshavsky depot (today St. Petersburg-Vitebsky in Shushary), Velikiye Luki), South Eastern Railway (Rtishchevo, Yelets depots), Volga Railway (Saratov, Volgograd, Astrakhan depots), Kaliningrad Railway (Kaliningrad depot), Northern Railway (Kotlas and Ivanovo depots), Gorky Railway (Agryz, Yudino depots), Sverdlovsk Railway (Voinovka, Serov-Sorting, and Yegorshino depots), South Urals Railway (Orenburg depot), Far Eastern Railway (Tynda depot), and others.

As of 2017, the oldest operational diesel locomotives of the series in Russia are TEP70-0034 (Serov depot of the Sverdlovsk Railway) and 0035, the number of which was changed to 0119 (Tynda depot of the Far Eastern Railway, temporarily not in operation). The last locomotive of the series, TEP70-0576, was sent to the Ivanovo depot.

The numbers of some TEP70 diesel locomotives were changed during service. Typically, number replacement was carried out to simplify the accounting of the locomotive fleet in the event that one of the fleet’s locomotives suffered a serious accident and was damaged beyond repair, at which point another locomotive from a different depot was assigned as its replacement. The replacement locomotive was excluded from the inventory fleet by its number, although in fact, the numbers of the damaged locomotive were applied to it, after which it continued to operate in the new depot as if it were the old one that had not been involved in an accident. During renumbering, second-type locomotives with vertical buffer lights received the numbers of third-type locomotives with horizontal lights. For example, the TEP70-0264 and TEP70-0186 locomotives collided and were destroyed in an accident near Tambov in 2009, after which they were withdrawn, and their numbers were subsequently assigned to the earlier production locomotives numbered 0159 and 0070.

==== Ukraine ====
TEP70-0145 with a passenger train

In the Ukrainian SSR, the Southern Railway received TEP70 diesel locomotives of the second type from the factory numbered 0046–0047, 0054–0062, 0066–0069, 0071–0082, 0085, 0087–0089, 0094, 0100–0101, 0109–0110, 0114–0117, 0141–0152, 0154–0156, 0159–0170, 0173–0181, as well as two third type diesel locomotives numbered 0221 and 0222. Initially, they were assigned to the Poltava, Osnova, and Lyubotyn depots. From Tashkent, in late 1980s, four Uzbek diesel locomotives numbered 0029–0032 were transferred to the Southern Railway. Subsequently, some locomotives (numbered 0085, 0159, 0169, 0176–0181) were transferred from the already independent Ukraine to Russia in the early 1990s. In the 2000s, some locomotives of the Southern Railway were transferred to the Odessa Railway.

As of 2017, approximately half of the remaining Ukrainian diesel locomotives are in operational service at the Poltava, Romny, Osnova, and Lozova depots of the Southern Railway and at the Taras Shevchenko and Mykolaiv depots of the Odesa Railway, while the other half are stored at these depots. Some locomotives have been decommissioned due to wear and economic infeasibility of repair. The diesel locomotives TEP70-0030 and 0031, which are the oldest operating units of the TEP70 series, remain in service.

==== Kazakhstan ====
Initially, Kazakhstan received locomotives numbered 0095, 0098, 0099, 0102–0108, 0111–0113 at the Alma-Ata depot of the Alma-Ata Railway. Later, five more locomotives arrived in Kazakhstan — three at the Ayagoz depot (numbered 0192, 0193, and 0199) and two at the "Yuzhny" space center depot at the Baikonur Cosmodrome (numbered 0196 and 0197). Subsequently, the Baikonur TEP70 locomotives were withdrawn, and all of the Alma-Ata locomotives, except for TEP70-0105, which was involved in a crossing accident and destroyed, and TEP70-0102, which was preserved for static display, were transferred to the Ayagoz depot. As of 2017, only the last of the locomotives, TEP70-0199, was in service, while the rest are stored.

==== Belarus ====
The damaged TEP70-0354 after the collision

Coupling of the Belarusian TEP70-0381 to a passenger train, view from the carriage

In Belarus, TEP70 locomotives were delivered to the Orsha and Minsk depots. From the factory, locomotives numbered 0205–0214, 0223–0227, 0265–0266, 0284–0286, 0290, 0313–0315, 0353–0354, 0357–0358, 0369–0370, 0372, 0374–0375, 0377, 0379, 0381, 0384, 0425, 0428, 0435, and 0465 were sent to the depots. Later in 2006, six more locomotives were sold to the Minsk-Sorting Depot — three from Latvia (numbered 0232, 0251, 0260) and three from Estonia (numbered 0322, 0325, 0326); in 2016, all six locomotives were transferred to the Orsha depot along with the others. Before being transferred to the Belarusian Railway, these locomotives underwent major repairs at the Daugavpils Locomotive Repair Plant, as a result of which their series was changed to TEP70K.

As of 2017, all serial TEP70 locomotives of the Belarusian Railway are in regular service, with the exception of two that were destroyed as a result of collisions at crossings and written off, numbered 0213 and 0354.

==== Latvia ====
Daugavpils Station. Arrival of the train with the Lithuanian TEP70-0347, coupling of the Latvian TEP70-0234 from the other end. At the moment of departure, smoke is visible and the sound of the diesel and traction motors accelerating can be heard.

Diesel locomotives numbered 0200–0204, 0228–0237, 0249–0253, 0260–0261, and 0267–0269 were delivered to Latvia from the factory, initially operated at the Zasulauks depot of the Baltic Railway, which became part of the Latvian Railways after the collapse of the Soviet Union. In 1994, they were transferred to the Riga depot. Later, the Latvian Railway sold some of its diesel locomotives to other countries. In 2005, TEP70-0269 was sold to Russia, and its number was changed to 0304 to replace a Russian locomotive that had been involved in a crash in Estonia. In 2006, three locomotives numbered 0232, 0251, and 0260 were sold to the Belarusian Railway to the Minsk depot, and two more locomotives numbered 0236 and 0237 were sold to the Estonian Railways for the Tallinn depot (now owned by the company GoRail). In 2012, the Lithuanian Railways sold locomotives numbered 0235 and 0249 to the Vilnius depot. TEP70-0228 was sold to the "Yakut Railways" company to the Aldan depot, where it was hardly used due to the local crews' lack of experience in operating these locomotives and extreme natural and climatic conditions. Of the locomotives remaining in Latvia, as of 2018, most are in reserve or have been withdrawn, with only 5 units, numbered 0203, 0204, 0230, 0267, and 0268, still in service.

==== Lithuania ====
Four locomotives, numbered 0332, 0335, 0346, and 0347, were delivered from the factory to the Vilnius depot in Lithuania for the Lithuanian Railways ("LG"). In 2012, two more locomotives, numbered 0235 and 0249, were also transferred there from Latvia. In 2015, the previously reserved locomotive TEP70-0249, which had been transferred to Lithuania, underwent modernization with the installation of an MTU diesel engine and a redesign of the front mask exterior similar to the TEP70BS, after which it was designated TEP70M. This is the first example of installing a foreign engine on a "standard" TEP70 (produced before 2006). As of 2017, three locomotives, numbered 0235, 0249, and 0347, are in service, while the others are stored.

==== Estonia ====
TEP70-0229 owned by GoRail arriving at Tallinn Baltic station with the international train from Moscow to St. Petersburg.

Four locomotives, numbered 0320, 0322, 0325, and 0326, arrived from the factory at the Tallinn depot in Estonia. In 2006, the last three, after undergoing major repairs, were sold to Belarus, and locomotives numbered 0236 and 0237 arrived from Latvia, which, together with the remaining TEP70-0320, became the property of the Estonian operator GoRail (Tallinn-Väike depot), where they are still in service. In 2017, TEP70-0229 was purchased in Latvia.

=== TEP70BS ===
The first TEP70BS-001 series locomotive was initially assigned to TCh-14 depot of the October Railway (St. Petersburg–Varshavskyy). It underwent a series of tests both individually and with various trainsets, including experimental runs at maximum speeds of up to 220 km/h (140 mph) and above. It was used in numerous tests of the EVS1/EVS2 "Sapsan" and Sm3 "Pendolino" high speed trains, as well as in passenger train operations on the St. Petersburg–Helsinki and St. Petersburg–Tallinn lines. Additionally, between 2008 and 2009, together with TEP70-0316, they transported "Sapsan" trainsets from the port of Ust-Luga to the TCh-10 "St. Petersburg-Moscow" depot (near Metallostroy station). In early 2010, it was withdrawn from service and placed in the Gatchina reserve base; in November 2010, it was sent for an overhaul to the Voronezh TRZ. In 2011, it was returned without repair. It currently serves as a source of spare parts and is held at the Gatchina reserve base. Further repair is planned.

As of January 2021, the majority of the 356 locomotives built are operated by Russian Railways on many railway mainlines; the very first locomotive, numbered 001, is not in service and is used as a source of spare parts. The TEP70BS was also exported to countries of the former USSR — Lithuania, Belarus, and Uzbekistan.

Since 13 March 2018, the TEP70BS locomotives were in service with a two-wire train power supply system to operate the Lastochka ES2GP electric multiple units as a locomotive traction set, enabling direct Lastochka services on partially non-electrified routes. In this case, the new power supply scheme allows all the electric multiple unit's own needs to be met while travelling on non-electrified sections of the railway. As of June 2019, TEP70BS locomotives with Lastochka ES2GP electric multiple units are in service on the Vladimir—Ivanovo, Luga—Pskov (from August 2019 on weekends to Pechory station), and Kamennogorsk—Sortavala routes, as well as with Lastochka ES1P electric multiple units on the Veliky Novgorod—Pskov route.

Since 25 December 2019, TEP70BS locomotives have been providing regular passenger service to the Crimean Peninsula via the Crimean Bridge on the section from Razyezd 9 km (Krasnodar Krai) to Dzhankoy (Republic of Crimea).

In November 2021, a TEP70BS series locomotive was delivered to Demirýollary in Turkmenistan, where it was solemnly received in accordance with traditional national customs and practices.

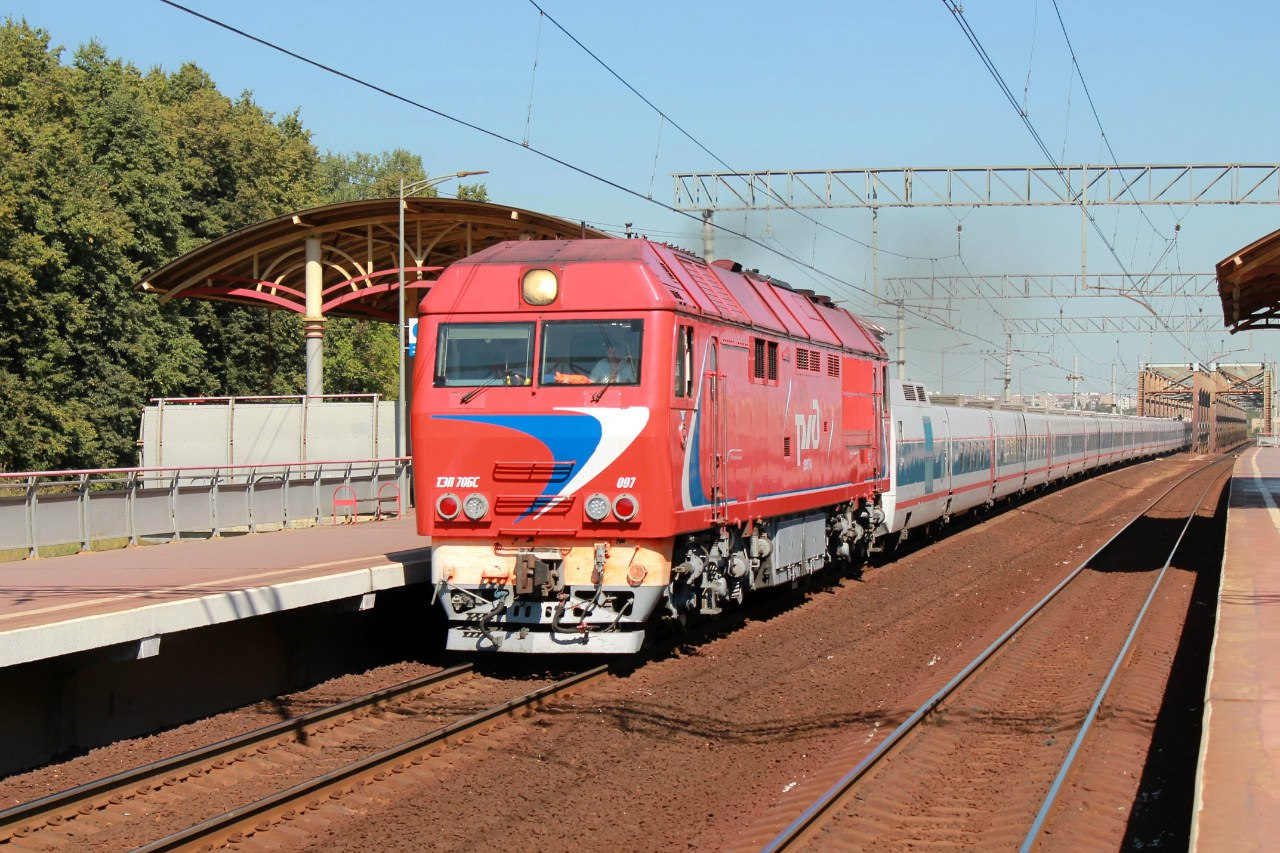
TEP70BS-097 with a Talgo Strizh train

TEP70BS-239 in the RZD corporate livery departs with the LDPR train

TEP70BS locomotive coupling up with an ES2G "Lastochka" EMU

=== TEP70U ===
TEP70U-001 performing maneuvers at the station

All 26 locomotives are assigned to the Voynovka depot (TChE-7 of the Sverdlovsk Railway) and serve the Tyumen—Surgut—Nizhnevartovsk route. The TEP70U-014 locomotive was taken out of service following a fire in the diesel compartment in March 2007. Initially, it was kept at the reserve base of the Vagaj station of the Sverdlovsk Railway, and then for a long time on the Kolomna plant area. It has undergone major overhaul repair and is now in active service at its home depot.

=== 2TE70 ===
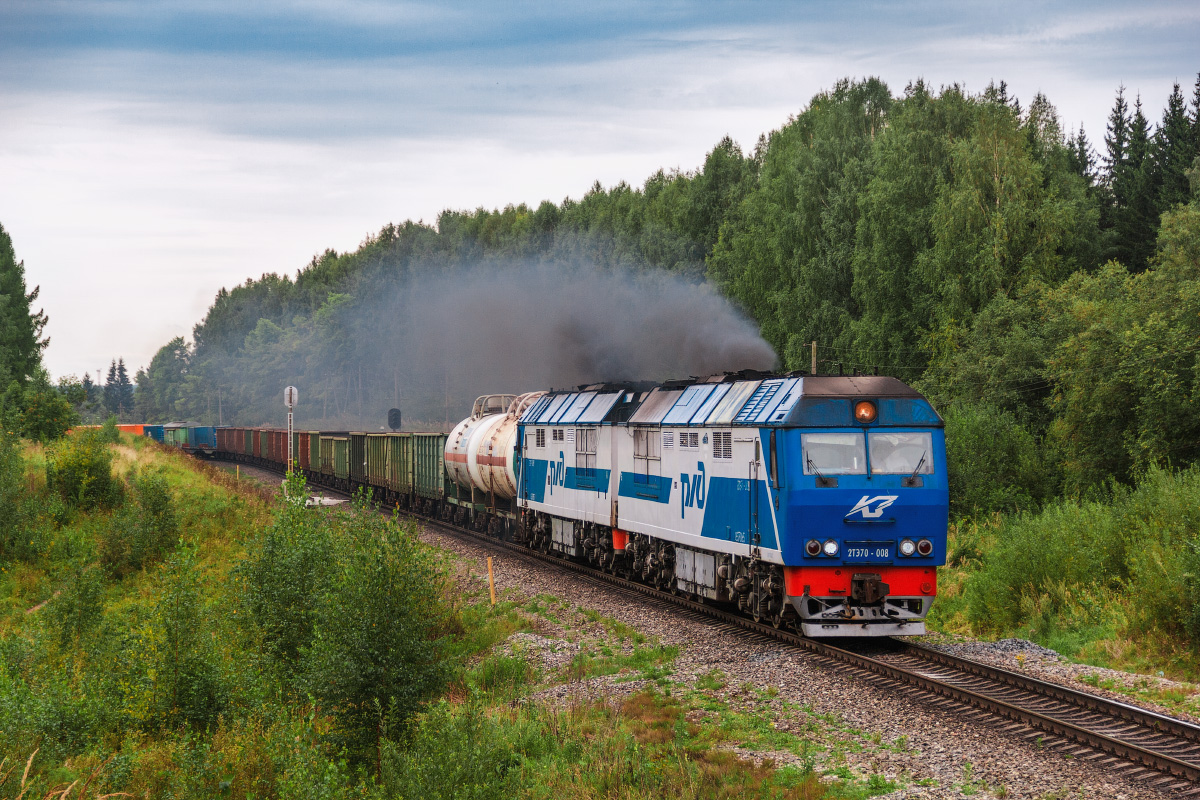
2TE70-008 with a mixed freight train

The 2TE70-001 locomotive, after testing, was sent to the Ulan-Ude depot of the East Siberian Railway in November 2006 for hauling freight trains, where it began service in November 2006. In 2007, the remaining 11 locomotives arrived at the same depot. In autumn 2009, locomotives numbered 001–004 and 008 were transferred to the Tynda depot of the Far Eastern Railway, where they operated for a short period, and in the spring of 2010, locomotives numbered 001–004 returned to the Ulan-Ude depot, while 008 was transferred to the Kotlas depot of the Northern Railway. In 2011, all remaining locomotives of the series were transferred to this depot. As of late 2017, out of twelve locomotives, six were used in hauling freight trains; locomotives numbered 001–004, 010, and 012 were temporarily out of service.

== Preservation ==
A total of 5 TEP70 locomotives have been preserved and plinthed as monuments in railway museums or on the premises of railway educational institutions and depots, one locomotive was cab preserved.

Fleet number	Image	Owner	Location	Country	Condition
TEP70-0007		Russian Railway Museum	St. Petersburg	Russia	Static display
TEP70-0008		Tashkent Museum of Railway Techniques	Tashkent	Uzbekistan	Static display
TEP70-0095		Pavlodar locomotive depot	Pavlodar	Kazakhstan	Monument
TEP70-0102		Transport Technology Center	Astana	Kazakhstan	Static display
TEP70-0130		Volgograd Railway Transport Technical School	Volgograd	Russia	Static display
TEP70-0203		Engineering Arsenal Museum	Daugavplis	Latvia	Cab preserved

== Developments ==
=== TEP75 ===
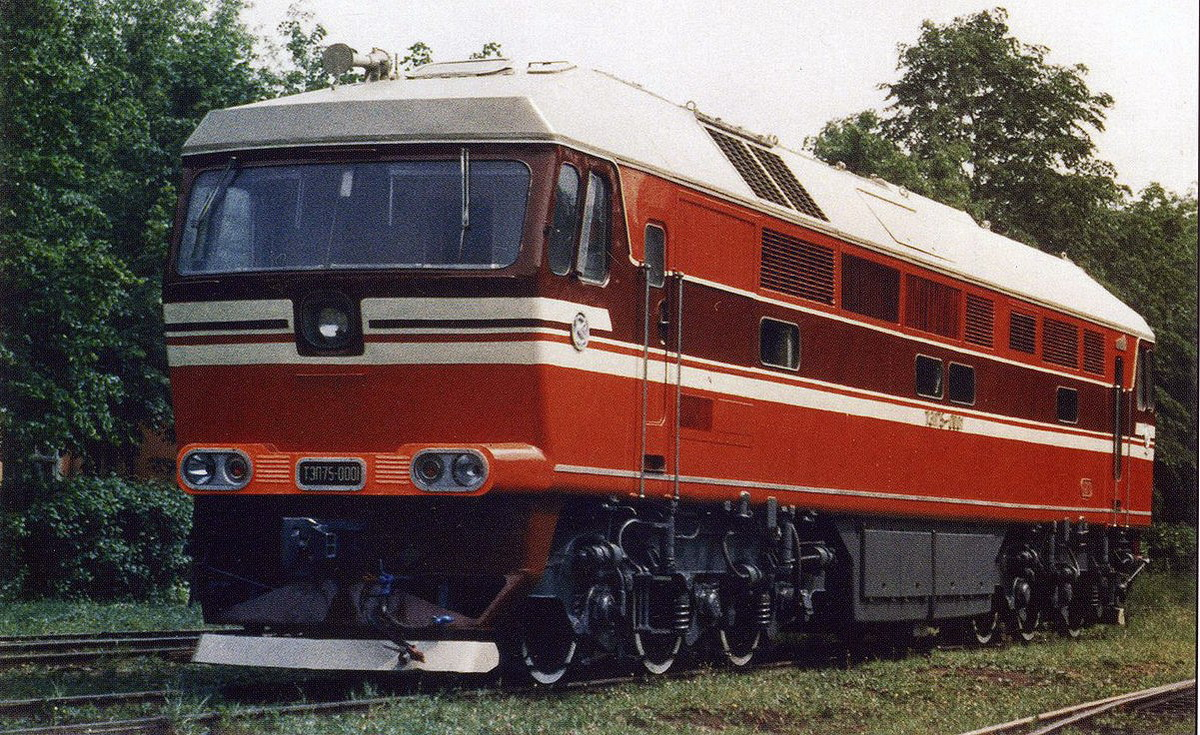
TEP75-0001 locomotive

The TEP75 diesel locomotive is a prototype passenger locomotive, designed according to the technical specifications of the USSR Ministry of Railways and built in 1976 in a quantity of two units. The design of its mechanical part and a number of components was later incorporated into the serial first type TEP70 locomotives. It differs from the latter in the use of a power plant one and a half times more powerful — a twenty-cylinder 1D49 diesel engine with an output of 4,413 kW (6,000 hp). The TEP75 locomotive was intended to replace the dual-unit 2TEP60 diesel locomotives of equivalent power and was designed for hauling long express trains, where the power of a single TEP70 would be insufficient, while at the same time a high adhesive weight for overcoming inclines was not required.

In terms of the mechanical design, they differed from the first series TEP70 by having a body of a different design, slightly lengthened and lowered, as well as new-design bogies that incorporated the most advanced technical solutions of the time, including a second stage of spring suspension made using Flexicoil-type supports. The new bogie demonstrated high dynamic performance on straight sections at speeds up to 200 km/h (120 mph), as well as on gentle curves. The TEP75 locomotive did not enter produuction due to the excessive mass of the diesel generator, the axle load exceeded the value specified by the customer by 1.5 t (1.48 long tons; 1.65 short tons). Consequently, work on the six-axle locomotive was stopped, and the design of the TEP80 locomotive with a 6000 hp diesel engine and two four-axle bogies was initiated.

The prototype diesel locomotives were tested for some time on the Moscow and North Caucasus Railways, and later were put into trial operation at the Leningrad-Varshavskyy depot. TEP75-0001 was retired from service in 1991 and subsequently remained on the depot premises for a while. TEP75-0002 was still used until the early 1990s, after which it was transferred to MGP "Stroitel"; it was destroyed in 1996 on the siding of Kushelevka station due to a runaway incident. Ultimately, the locomotives of this series were scrapped and none have survived.

=== TEP80 ===
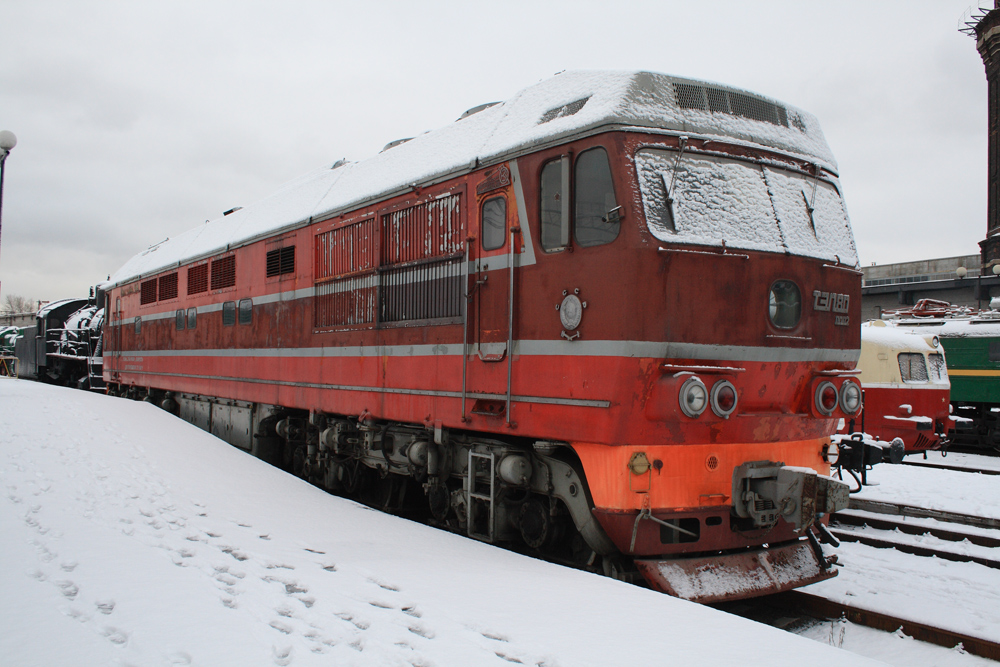
TEP80-0002 locomotive in the Russian Railway Museum at Varshavskiy Station (now relocated to a new site near the Baltiysky Station)

The TEP80 diesel locomotive is an eight-axle locomotive with two four-axle bogies, a newly designed body with a length of 24,400 mm (80 ft 1 in) between couplers, and a twenty-cylinder D49 diesel engine with a power output of 4,413 kW (6,000 hp), similarly used in the TEP75. The decision to develop an eight-axle locomotive with a power of 6,000 hp was driven by the increase in passenger train lengths in the 1980s to 20–22 cars, and in some cases up to 25 cars, which also led to the prior ordering of eight-axle ChS7 and ChS8 electric locomotives for electrified railway lines with direct and alternating current. The transition from a six-axle chassis, previously used on the TEP75 diesel locomotive of the same power, to an eight-axle one was also necessitated by the need to reduce the axle load on the rails due to the use of a heavy diesel generator. As a result, the plant's specialists developed an original four-axle articulated bogie, and in 1988 and 1989, the Kolomna Plant produced two diesel locomotives, designated as TEP80.

The TEP80-0001 locomotive was put into experimental operation on the October Railway at the Velikiye Luki depot, where it was used in passenger service alongside 2TEP60 locomotives, primarily with 001/002 “Latvia” trains (later “Latvijas Ekspresis”) and 003/004 “Jurmala.” In the late 1990s, due to engine malfunctions, the locomotive was withdrawn from passenger service and displaced at the BZ Dno; no funds were received for the restoration of the non-standard power unit. TEP80-0002 was assigned to the All-Russian Research Institute of Railway Transport and participated in rolling stock tests at the Shcherbinka ring of VNIIZhT, as well as on the St. Petersburg–Moscow line. Due to the need to conduct trial runs at speeds exceeding 250 km/h (160 mph), gearboxes with a lower gear ratio were installed, and in 1992 a diesel locomotive with a laboratory car reached a speed of 262 km/h (163 mph). At this point, the capabilities of the laboratory car were exhausted, which led to the installation of research equipment directly on the diesel locomotive, and on 5 October 1993, a solo run on the Shlyuz–Doroshikha section was conducted at speeds of up to 271 km/h (168 mph), setting a world speed record for diesel locomotives. The locomotive tests were successfully completed; however, the financial situation of the Russian Ministry of Railways, the high cost of production, and the declining demand for this type of diesel locomotive due to the decrease in passenger traffic resulted in the decision not to proceed with serial production.

Both locomotives were preserved as a static display. For some time after the completion of the tests, they were displaced on the VNIIZhT depot ring in Shcherbinka, and in late 2000s, they were sent to railway museums. The first locomotive is in the Novosibirsk Museum of Railway Technology, and the second is in the Russian Railway Museum near the Baltiysky Station.

== Accidents and incidents ==
TEP70-0236 as a result of crashing into the platform at Tallinn Baltic station in Estonia

- On 19 June 2008, TEP70-0236 with a "Tallinn express" train arriving at Tallinn Baltic station in Estonia, failed to stop in time, as a result it crashed through the buffer stop and ran onto the station platform. No casualties occurred from the accident, the locomotive was withdrawn from service due to the damage.
- On 28 January 2022, an unknown TEP70 locomotive derailed onto the turntable at the TChE-14 locomotive depot in Orenburg, Russia. It derailed on one bogie, no casualties have occurred.
- On 14 September 2025, TEP70BS-362 with an express train from St. Petersburg to Pechora, derailed off the tracks at a high speed of 153 km/h (95 mph) on the October Railway near Semrino in the Leningrad Region. The locomotive was traveling as a reserve under the control of a single instructor-driver. It accelerated to 163 km/h (101 mph) in a railway section with an 80 km/h (50 mph) speed limit, after which it derailed at a railway switch. As a result of the accident, only driver died from the sustained injuries.
- In August 2026, an unknown TEP70 locomotive was destroyed from the Russian missile strike at the Trostyanets-Smorodino railway station in Sumy Oblast, Ukraine. The missile strike was prior to the 2022 Russian invasion of Ukraine.

== Repair plants ==
- Poltava Locomotive Repair Plant
- Voronezh Locomotive Repair Plant
- Ussuriysk Locomotive Repair Plant
- Daugavpils Locomotive Repair Plant

== Nicknames ==
- Tapok (Russian: Тапок = slipper)
- Kirpich (Russian: Кирпич = brick) – however, this nickname is often applied to EP1 electric locomotive
- Grob (Russian: Гроб = coffin) – due to the shape of the roof
- Sarkofag (Russian: Саркофаг = sarcophagus) – due to the shape of the roof
- Gorbatyy (Russian: Горбатый = hunchbacked) – due to the shape of the roof

== See also ==
- TEP150
- TE33A
- EMD F40PH – North American passenger diesel locomotive
