= Tashkent Museum of Railway Techniques =

Railway museum at Tashkent, Uzbekistan

- Toshkent Temiryo'l Texnikasi Muzeyi
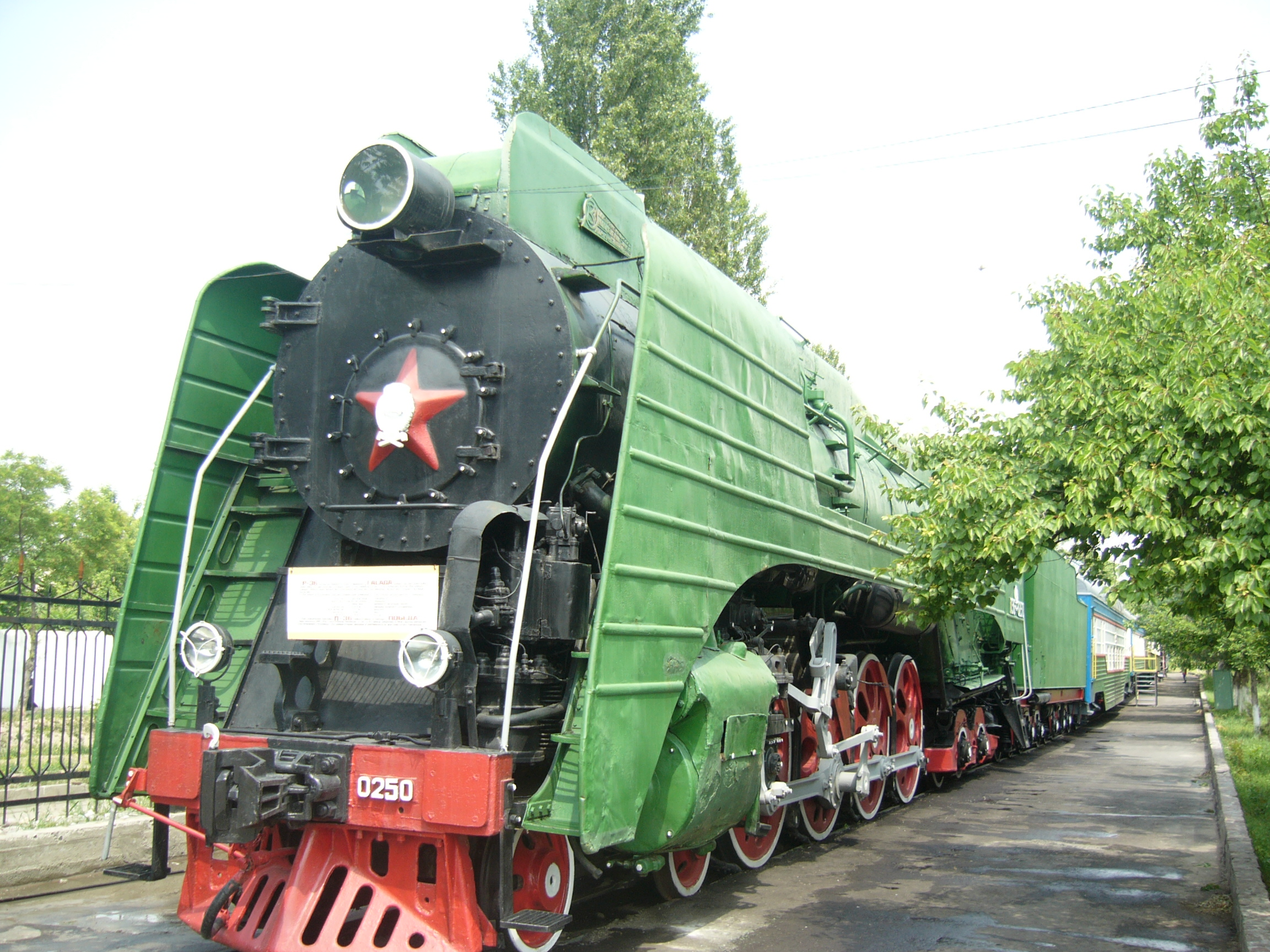
- Established: 1989
- Location: Tashkent, Uzbekistan
- Type: Railway techniques institute, public

Tashkent Museum of Railway Equipment is a railway museum in Tashkent and is the only such museum in Uzbekistan.

== History ==
The museum opened on August 4, 1989, at the 100-year anniversary of the first railways in Central Asia. The museum sponsors exhibits on the development of railway technologies in Uzbekistan in the second half of the 20th century.

== Contents ==
The museum hosts 13 steam engines, 18 diesel and 3 electric locomotives that were used across Uzbekistan to pull different types of wagons - many of which are also on display. The equipment required to operate a railway e.g. signals, semaphore and radio and paraphernalia such as emblems, tools and uniforms of the machinists is included.

The oldest example of railway engine that can be seen there is an OV engine 1534 ("The Lamb"), which has 700 horsepower, was made in 1914, and reached a speed of 55 km/h. The most powerful engine presented in the museum is P 36 ("Victory"), which has about 3000 horsepower. The engine was invented in 1833–1834 by Efim and Makar Cherepanovs and was used up to 1956 when replaced with diesel locomotives – the locomotives of 1961 could reach a speed of 60 km/h.

The museum offers a ride on one of the oldest trains, along a track that is almost 1 km long, through its grounds.

=== Steam Locomotives ===
Photo	Class	№	Year built	Country of origin	Builder
	К^{ч}4	228	1950	Czechoslovakia	Škoda
	С^{у}	250-94	1924	(Soviet Union) USSR	Bryansk Machine-Building Plant
	9П	649	1936	(Soviet Union) USSR	Kolomna Locomotive Works
	О^{в}	1534	1914	Russian Empire	Kolomna Locomotive Works
	Е^{а}	2371	1944	United States	Baldwin Locomotive Works
	Э^{м}	732-35	1931	(Soviet Union) USSR	Malyshev Factory
	Э^{Р}	772-89	1936	Czechoslovakia	ЧКД
	СО^{м}17	1-2657	1934	(Soviet Union) USSR	Malyshev Factory
	Э^{У}	705-74	1930	(Soviet Union) USSR	JSC Michurinsky Locomotive Plant Milorem
	ФД20	2849	1932	(Soviet Union) USSR	
	ЛВ	0487	1956	(Soviet Union) USSR	Lugansk Diesel Locomotive Plant
	П36	0250	1946	(Soviet Union) USSR	Kolomna Locomotive Works
	ТЭ52	5200	1943	Nazi Germany	Fablok

=== Diesel Locomotives ===
Photo	Class	№	Year built	Country of origin	Builder
	ТГК2	2245	1962	(Soviet Union) USSR	Kambarka Engineering Works
	ТГМ23В	1654	1956	(Soviet Union) USSR	
	ТГМ1	1681	1966	(Soviet Union) USSR	
	ТГМ3	1156	1956	(Soviet Union) USSR	Lyudinovsky Locomotive Plant
	Д^{а}	31	1945	United States	ALCO
	ТЭ2	025	1951	(Soviet Union) USSR	Kharkiv Transport Engineering Plant
	ЧМЭ3	4115	1964	Czechoslovakia	ЧКД
	2ТЭ10В	3928	1975	(Soviet Union) USSR	Lugansk Diesel Locomotive Plant
	ТЭМ2	2558	1962	(Soviet Union) USSR	Bryansk Machine-Building Plant
	2ТЭ10Л	254	1962	(Soviet Union) USSR	Voroshilovgrad Locomotive works
	ТЭ3	(102—104) 61-06	1953	(Soviet Union) USSR	Kharkiv Transport Engineering Plant
	ТЭП60	105-108 1081—2090	1961	(Soviet Union) USSR	Kolomna Locomotive Works
	ТЭП70	70-0008-1774	1973	(Soviet Union) USSR	Kolomna Locomotive Works
	ТЭП10 «Стрела»	10-126	1964	(Soviet Union) USSR	Kharkiv Transport Engineering Plant
	ТЭ1	20-068	1947	(Soviet Union) USSR	Kharkiv Transport Engineering Plant
	ТУ7	3143		(Soviet Union) USSR	Kambarka Engineering Works
	ТУ	0544		(Soviet Union) USSR	Kambarka Engineering Works
	~~ТУ 7а~~	~~3142~~		(Soviet Union) USSR	Kambarka Engineering Works
	~~ТУ 2~~	~~064~~		(Soviet Union) USSR	Kambarka Engineering Works

=== Electric Locomotives ===
Photo	Class	№	Year built	Country of origin	Builder
	ВЛ22^{м}	374	1950	(Soviet Union) USSR	Novocherkassk Electric Locomotive Plant
	ВЛ60К	157	1956	(Soviet Union) USSR	Novocherkassk Electric Locomotive Plant
	ЭР2	1270	1981	(Soviet Union) USSR	Rīgas Vagonbūves Rūpnīca

=== Maintenance-of-Way Equipment ===
Photo	Class	№	Year built	Country of origin	Builder
	Автодрезина АГВ	211	1971	(Soviet Union) USSR	Tikhoretsky Machine-Building Plant
	Автодрезина ДГ^{ку}	134	1975	(Soviet Union) USSR	Tikhoretsky Machine-Building Plant
	Автодрезина АГ^{му}	5887	1959	(Soviet Union) USSR	Tikhoretsky Machine-Building Plant
	Автомотриса АС1^{а}	2134	1964	(Soviet Union) USSR	Velikiy Lukomotiv Locomotive Plant
	Грейферный кран МК	6	1930	(Soviet Union) USSR	Lviv Locomotive Repair Plant
	Прицеп УП-2	2989	1972		
	Рельсосварочная машина	РСМ3	1974		
	Путестроительный кран	ДЖ-45	1937	(Soviet Union) USSR	Kolomna Locomotive Works
	Выправочно-подбивоотделочная ВПО	3000	1962		
	Шпалопобивочная машина	001	1961	(Soviet Union) USSR	Kirov Machine Works
	Снегоочиститель	СДП-216	1949		
	Двухосный вагон	САЗ 5000	1946		
	Платформа грузовая (думпкар)	ЦНИИ 959738	1959		

=== Passenger Equipment ===
Photo	Class	№	Year built	Country of origin	Builder
	Двухпалубный вагон с куполом обзора	САЗ 4000	1965	(Soviet Union) USSR	CJSC VAGONMASH
	Межобластной вагон		1976	Polish People's Republic	Завод Цегельского город Познань
