= 1956 in radio =

== Events ==
- 22 January – First emergency Sig Alert broadcast in California as a result of the Redondo Junction train wreck.
- 13 February – NBC and Westinghouse Broadcasting consummate a station ownership trade which saw NBC attaining owned-and-operated AM and TV stations in Philadelphia (renamed WRCV), and Westinghouse receiving NBC's AM, FM and TV stations in Cleveland (all of which took the KYW callsign). A later legal battle found that NBC engaged in extortion to make the trade happen, even threatening to pull the NBC-TV affiliation off of both Westinghouse's TV stations in Philadelphia and Boston. The swap was reversed by the FCC in June 1965.
- 1 August – Fu Hsing Broadcasting Station is opened by the Republic of China Armed Forces.
- 24 September – Manila Chronicle owners Eugenio Lopez, Sr. and Fernando Lopez of the Philippines established Chronicle Broadcasting Network and launches AM stations DZXL 960 (The Voice of the People), DZQL Radio Reloj, and the first FM station DZYL-FM 102.1 MHz (now MOR 101.9).
- 9 November – The Pittsburgh Police "emergency band" frequency goes wild receiving Cuban police dispatches and squawks from a Sheffield, England public safety band. The transmissions are never explained but cease by nightfall.
- 22 December – The BBC Light Programme is able to reach a wider audience when it begins transmitting from the Wenvoe transmitting station in Wales on VHF.
- date unknown – The IRIB World Service, Iran's official international broadcasting radio network, is launched.

== Debuts ==
- January 22 – Fort Laramie debuts on CBS.
- January 27 – CBS Radio Workshop debuts on CBS.
- January 29 – Indictment debuts on CBS.
- 19 May – First edition of the popular record request programme Sveriges bilradio (1956–1973) on Sveriges Radiotjänst (forerunner of Sveriges Radio).
- June – My Word! is piloted on the BBC Midland Home Service, chaired by John Arlott.
- July 30 -NBC Bandstand debuts on NBC.
- August 15 – WWRI-West Warwick, Rhode Island begins broadcasting.

== Closings ==
- February 4 – True or False ends its run on network radio (Mutual)
- April 7 – ABC Dancing Party ends its run on network radio.
- June 29 – The Brighter Day ends its run on network radio (CBS).
- June 30 – The Guiding Light officially ends its 19-year run on CBS radio, having spent the previous four years on both radio and television. It continues on television until September 2009.
- July 1 – America's Town Meeting of the Air ends its run on network radio (ABC).
- November 16 – Aunt Jenny's Real Life Stories ends its run on network radio (CBS).
- December 20 – The Jack Carson Show ends its run on network radio (CBS).
- December 30 – The Greatest Story Ever Told ends its run on network radio (ABC).

== Births ==
- February 22 – Hugh Hewitt, American lawyer, academic and radio host
- February 27 – Tim Brando, American radio host and sportscaster
- March 1 – Helen Boaden, British broadcasting executive
- March 27 – Dale Arnold, American sportscaster
- May 4 – Charlotte Green, English radio newsreader and announcer
- June 2 – Susan Rae, Scottish radio newsreader and announcer
- July 4 – Mark Belling, radio talk-show host for WISN in Milwaukee, Wisconsin
- July 16 – Jerry Doyle, American actor and radio talk show host
- September 1 – Bernie Wagenblast, American editor and broadcaster
- October 6 – Jimmy Cefalo, American sportscaster, game show host and play-by-play commentator for Miami Dolphins, former NFL player
- October 30 – Juliet Stevenson, British actress
- November 8 – Richard Curtis, British scriptwriter
- November 27 – John McCarthy, British journalist
- December 26
  - Simon Fanshawe, British writer and broadcaster
  - David Sedaris, American raconteur
- December 29 – Fred MacAulay, Scottish comedian
- December 31 – Shelagh Rogers, Canadian radio host
- Steve Buckley, Boston Herald sports columnist, Boston, Massachusetts sports radio station WEEI broadcaster from 1993
- Christopher O'Riley, American classical pianist and host of weekly NPR program From the Top

== Deaths ==
- May 20 - Max Beerbohm, British theatre critic, humorist and broadcaster, 83
