= 1956 in rail transport =

This article lists events related to rail transport that occurred in 1956.

== Events ==
=== January events ===
- January 5 – The General Motors Electro-Motive Division "Aerotrain" makes its initial Chicago to Detroit test run.
- January 11 – The Chicago, Indianapolis and Louisville Railway officially adopts its longtime nickname, Monon Railroad, as corporate title.
- January 20 – Circular Quay railway station opens in Sydney, completing the City Circle.
- January 22 – Redondo Junction train wreck, Santa Fe Railway's San Diegan passenger train derails just outside Los Angeles Union Passenger Terminal. The accident is announced over the radio and so many doctors, nurses and sightseers drive to the scene that it causes one of the first Sig Alerts.

=== February events ===
- February 11 – Rock Island's Aerotrain, "Jet Rocket" begins service between Chicago and Peoria, Illinois.
- February 28 – Swampscott train wreck, a southbound Danvers–Boston commuter train crashed into the rear of a stopped Portsmouth–Boston local train just north of Swampscott station during a snowstorm. The collision, blamed on the engineer operating at unsafe speeds for the conditions, killed 13 people and injured 283.
- February 28 – A collision in Revere, Massachusetts injured 143 people – some of whom had already been in the Swampscott wreck.

=== March events ===
- March 5 – The last steam locomotive purchased new by Southern Pacific Railroad, cab forward class AC-12 4-8-8-2 number 4294, is retired from revenue service.
- March 15 – In Tokyo, Japan, the Marunouchi Line begins service between Kasumigaseki and Shinjuku.
- March 17 – Trailer Train Corporation begins operations. Stockholders include the Pennsylvania Railroad, Norfolk and Western Railroad, Frisco and Missouri Pacific Railroad.
- March 24 – Kansas City Southern Railway officially dedicates Deramus Yards in Shreveport, Louisiana, named in honor of William N. Deramus, Jr., the company's current president.
- March – Mitsubishi Heavy Industries of Japan construct the first batch of 2-10-2 steam locomotives for the isolated Ramal Ferro Industrial Río Turbio (RFIRP) 750 mm gauge railway in the southern Patagonian Desert of Argentina to haul coal from Río Turbio for shipping from Río Gallegos, Santa Cruz.

=== April events ===
- April 6 – The East Broad Top Railroad, a 3 ft (914 mm) gauge carrier in Pennsylvania, ceases operations.
- April 28 – Canadian Pacific Railway discontinues the former Imperial Limited passenger train schedule.

=== May events ===
- May 22 – The last Chicago and North Western Railway steam locomotive-powered Chicago commuter train drops its fires.

=== June events ===
- June 3 – Remaining Second class accommodation on British Railways trains (by now surviving only on Southern Region boat trains) is abolished and Third class redesignated Second class.
- June 30 - The Rochester Subway (Rochester Industrial and Rapid Transit Railway) ceases operation after 29 years.

=== July events ===
- July 8 – The Atchison, Topeka and Santa Fe Railway equips its El Capitan with new Hi-Level cars from Budd.
- July 27 – The last two Chesapeake and Ohio Railway 2-6-6-6 "Alleghenies" are taken off standby status. The last revenue run had been made about a month earlier.
- July 31 – Great Northern Railway runs its last electric locomotive over Stevens Pass.

=== August events ===
- August 6 – The last big diesel locomotive constructed by Baldwin-Lima-Hamilton at Eddystone, Pennsylvania, is shipped: Columbus Geneva Steel #35.
- August 12 – The Manila Railroad Company commences the dieselization of its entire fleet.
- August 27 – Pacific Great Eastern Railway, in British Columbia, holds official opening ceremonies to celebrate the beginning of service over its line (which occurred on June 11, 1956).

=== September events ===
- September 1 – Last day of steam locomotive operations on the Bessemer and Lake Erie Railroad.
- September 13 – Last day of steam locomotive power for the New York Central Railroad trains in New York City suburban service.
- September 16 – Chicago South Shore and South Bend Railroad begins operating over a relocated alignment through East Chicago, Indiana, reducing travel time on the railroad between Gary, Indiana, and Chicago by ten minutes.

=== October events ===
- October
  - General Motors Electro-Motive Division introduces the EMD FL9.
  - Harry W. Von Willer succeeds Paul W. Johnston as president of the Erie Railroad.
- October 18 – Head-on collision between two Atlantic Coast Line Railroad freight trains at Pineola, Florida in Citrus County kills five crewmen.
- October 30 – Baldwin-Lima-Hamilton ships its last common carrier sized diesel locomotive from Eddystone, Pennsylvania: Erie Mining S12 #403. The locomotive had been built in 1955.
- October 31 – The last surface streetcars operate in Brooklyn, New York.

=== November events ===
- November – British Railways agrees specification and plan for national installation of the Automatic Warning System (its version of Automatic Train Control).
- November 8 – Paris Métro introduces pneumatic tires on some trains.

=== December events ===
- December 30 – Last day of operation on Liverpool Overhead Railway (England).

=== Unknown date events ===
- Last steam locomotive built for Soviet Railways, express passenger class P36 4-8-4 No. 251, from Kolomna Locomotive Works.
- First China Railways QJ 2-10-2 built: the class will eventually exceed 4,000 in number.
- Benjamin W. Heineman becomes president of the Chicago and North Western Railway.
- The Pullman-Standard "Sun Lounges" debut on the Seaboard Air Line Railroad Silver Meteor.
- The Pullman-Standard "Placid series" sleeping cars enter service with the Union Pacific Railroad.
