= Loyd Sigmon =

American radio broadcaster

- Born: Loyd C. Sigmon; May 6, 1909; Stigler, Oklahoma, U.S.
- Died: June 2, 2004 (aged 95); Bartlesville, Oklahoma, U.S.
- Occupation: Radio broadcaster
- Known for: Creator and namesake of Sig Alert
- Spouse: Patricia Lee

Loyd C. Sigmon (May 6, 1909 – June 2, 2004) was an American radio broadcaster, best known as the creator and namesake of Sig Alert.

== Early life ==
Sigmon was born in Stigler, Oklahoma to a cattle-ranching family. He soon became interested in radio, earning his amateur ("ham") radio license at age 14. His broadcasting career began in 1932 at the Boston Short Wave and Television Laboratories. In 1941 he was hired as an engineer for MacMillan Petroleum Company's flagship radio station, KMPC, in Los Angeles, California. That job was interrupted by World War II; he served in the United States Army Signal Corps on General Dwight D. Eisenhower's staff.

== Career ==
Sigmon resumed his job in Los Angeles after the war, rising to the position of Executive Vice President with Gene Autry's Golden West Broadcasters, which owned eight radio and two television stations on the west coast, including KMPC.

In 1955, Sigmon invented a specialized radio and tape recorder that the Los Angeles Police Department used to alert radio stations throughout the city to traffic conditions and emergencies. The messages were referred to as "Sigmon traffic alerts," a phrase quickly shortened to "Sig Alert." The system, now employed throughout California, has been copied in numerous other areas. For this, Bill Keene called him the "father of L.A. traffic reporting".

Loyd Sigmon received recognition and honors from local and state government agencies, the National Safety Council, and broadcasting and radio organizations. In 1998, when the California Department of Transportation (Caltrans) and the California Highway Patrol opened their Freeway Traffic Center in Los Angeles, Sigmon attended as their special Guest of Honor. He was quoted in the Los Angeles Times as saying, "I ran a multimillion-dollar corporation, but it's the Sig Alert that people remember me for."

== Personal life ==
Sigmon and his wife Patricia "Pat" Lee had a home in Palm Springs, California in the late 1950s.

Sigmon kept his amateur radio license, W6LQ, current even after retiring to Oklahoma. Sigmon died in an assisted living facility in Bartlesville, Oklahoma after suffering from Parkinson's disease.
