= 1924 in rail transport =

This article lists events related to rail transport that occurred in 1924.

== Events ==
=== January ===
- January 24 – Vladimir Lenin's funeral train is hauled from Gerasimovskaya (Gorki) to Moscow Paveletskaya railway station by locomotive U-127.

=== March ===
- March 12 – Electrification is completed on what is now Hamburg S-Bahn's Line 1 between Ohlsdorf and Poppenbüttel.
- March 19 – Baldwin Locomotive Works completes the last locomotive commercially manufactured for Maine narrow gauge railroads.
- March 31 – American Car and Foundry acquires Pacific Car and Foundry.

=== April ===
- April 12– Kyushu Railroad Line, as predecessor for Nishitetsu Tenjin Omuta Line, Fukuoka Tenjin to Kurume route officially completed in Fukuoka Prefecture, Kyushu Island, Japan.
- April 27 – The New York Central Railroad introduces the Ohio State Limited passenger train between New York City and Cincinnati, Ohio.

=== May ===
- May 8 – Arthur Honegger’s “Pacifica 231” premieres. The orchestral tone poem reflects Honegger's impressions of steam engines.

=== June ===
- June 7 – London, Midland and Scottish Railway opens the luxury Gleneagles Hotel in Scotland.
- June 28 – The streetcar system in Adrian, Michigan, is abandoned.

=== July ===
- July 31 – Uetsu Line, Niitsu of Niigata to Akita route officially completed in Japan, as same time, Osaka via Niitsu to Aomori route direct express train service start.

=== August ===
- August 7 – Streetcars operate for the last time in Williamsport, Pennsylvania, to be replaced with buses.
- August 10 – A first section for Rome–Lido railway, Porta San Paolo of Rome to Ostia Antica route, officially regular service start in Italy.
- August 14 – The New York Central tests a General Electric diesel-electric locomotive. The locomotive succeeds in starting a train of 93 cars on level track.

=== September ===
- September 28 – The Chicago and Alton Railroad places "the handsomest train in the world" into Chicago – St. Louis service. The red painted, million dollar train competes with Illinois Central Railroad's green and black Daylight Special and Wabash's blue Blue Banner Special.

=== October ===
- October 23 – Two trolley cars of the Hull Electric Railway in Ottawa collide head-on due to a misunderstanding in operations around track maintenance work.

=== November ===
- November 3 – Lytham rail crash on London, Midland and Scottish Railway occurs when a locomotive tyre fractures. 14 people are killed in the subsequent derailment as the train hits a bridge and a signal box.
- November 7 – Experimental three-truck diesel-electric locomotive Ys. N 002 (designed by Ya. M. Hakkel) makes first trial trip on the Oktyabrskaya Railway in the Soviet Union.
- November 30 – The Rauma Line from Dombås to Åndalsnes in Norway is opened.

=== December ===
- December 17 – The first diesel-electric locomotive enters regular service, on the docks in the Bronx.
- December 30 – The first section of the Barcelona Metro opens in Spain.

=== Unknown date ===
- The London and North Eastern Railway in Britain officially names its Flying Scotsman express train, although the 10.00 a.m. service from London King's Cross to Edinburgh Waverley over the East Coast Main Line has previously been known by this title, and has operated since 1862.
- Electrification of the Paris suburban network begins.
- ALCO produces its first diesel locomotive using electrical components from General Electric.
- Hitachi build Japan's first electric locomotive.

== Deaths ==
=== February deaths ===
- February 16
  - John William Kendrick, chief engineer 1888–1893, general manager 1893-1899 and vice president 1899-1911 of Northern Pacific Railway and vice-chairman of the board for Atchison, Topeka and Santa Fe Railway, dies (b. 1853).
  - Wilhelm Schmidt, German pioneer of superheated steam for use in locomotives (born 1858).
