= Soviet locomotive class VL19 =

Class of electric locomotives

VL19 or ВЛ19
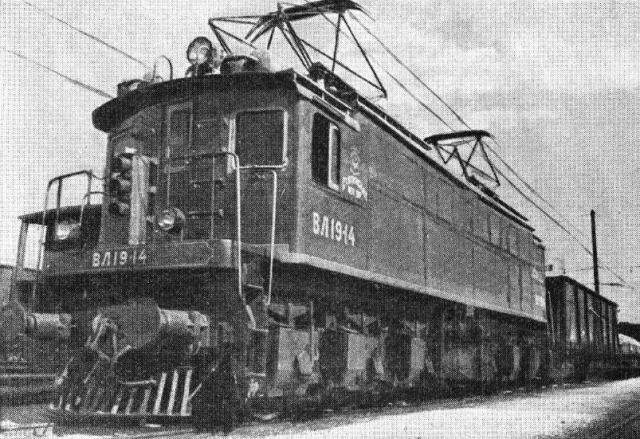
- Electric locomotive VL19-14
Type and origin
- Power type: Electric
- Builder: Kolomna Locomotive Works
- Build date: 1932 to 1938
- Total produced: 145
Specifications
- Configuration
  - UIC: Co-Co
- Gauge: 1,524 mm (5 ft)
- Wheel diameter: 48 inches (1,219 mm)
- Axle load: 19 t (19 long tons; 21 short tons) (?)
- Loco weight: 114 t (112 long tons; 126 short tons)
- Electric system/s: 1.5 kV DC Overhead line Some dual voltage: 1.5 and 3 kV DC
- Current pickup: Pantograph
- Traction motors: 6 x 340 kW (460 hp); Gear ratio 3.74:1
Performance figures
- Maximum speed: 85 km/h (53 mph)
- Power output: 2,040 kW (2,740 hp)
Career
- Preserved: 2

The VL19 (Cyrillic script: ВЛ19) was the first class of electric locomotives designed in the Soviet Union. Earlier classes had been designed in the United States and Italy. The VL19s were produced from 1932 to 1938 and became the main freight and passenger DC electric locomotives in the Soviet Union. They were built for 1,500 volt DC but some were later converted to dual voltage. The designation VL was in honour of Vladimir Lenin and "19" Indicates a 19-ton axle load.

== Equipment ==
The locomotives had a Co-Co wheel arrangement and there were six 340 kW traction motors giving a total output of 2,040 kW. The gear ratio was 3.74:1 and the wheels were 48 inch diameter. Following the introduction of 3,000 volt DC electrification, some locomotives were converted to dual voltage, 1,500 or 3,000 volt DC.

== Preservation ==
Two locomotives have been preserved:

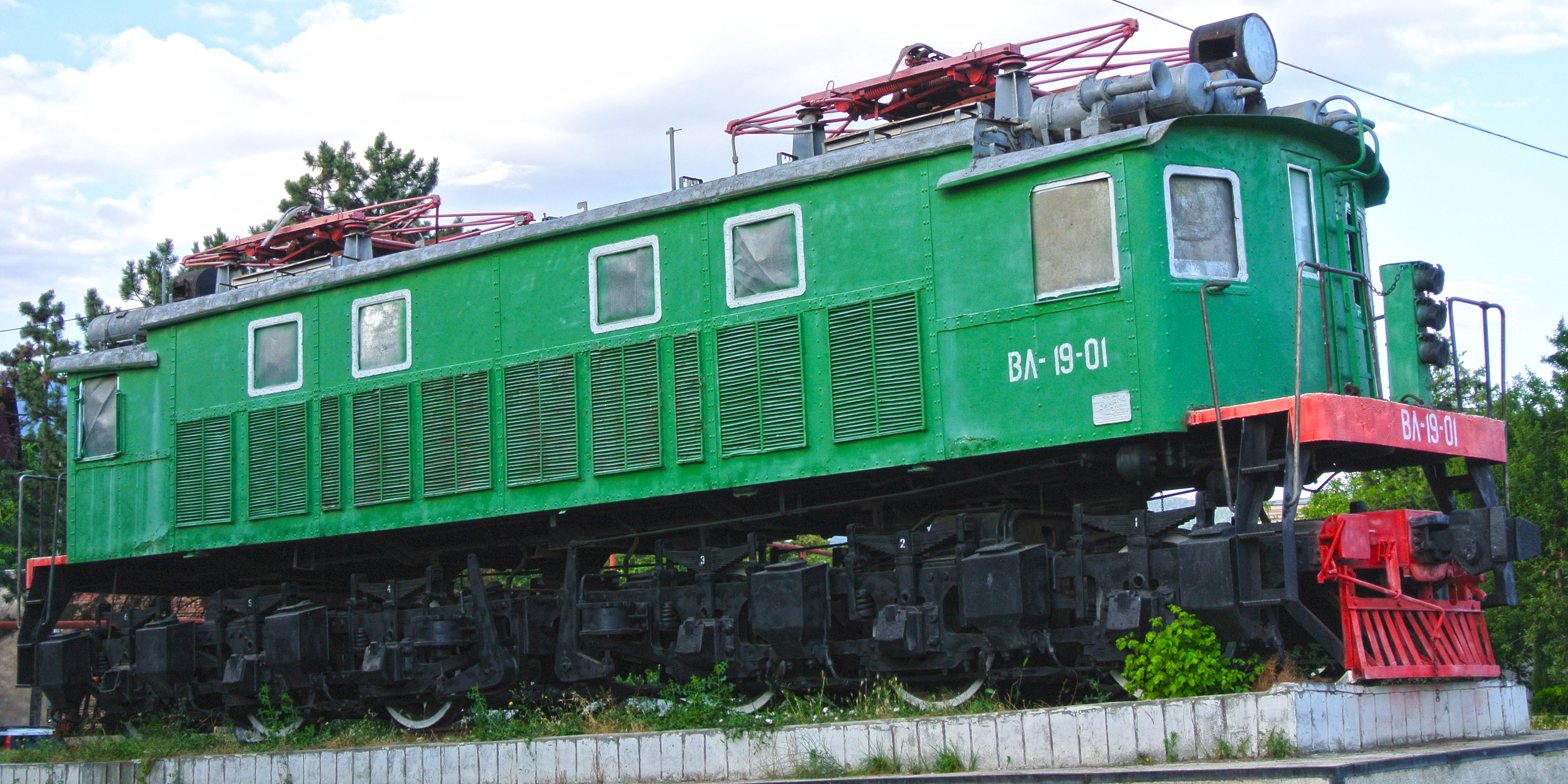
VL-19-01 preserved at Khashuri Station, Georgia

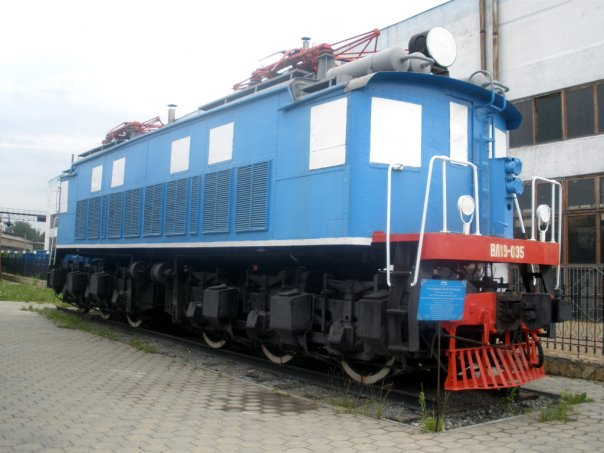
VL-19-035 preserved at Sverdlovsk station, Ekaterinburg, Russia
