= 1959 in rail transport =

This article lists events related to rail transport that occurred in 1959.

== Events ==
=== January events ===
- January 4 - Passenger service resumes on the Strasburg Rail Road in Pennsylvania for tourists.
- January 5 - Foulridge railway station closes on the Midland Railway (originally the Leeds and Bradford Extension Railway) in Lancashire, England.

=== February events ===
- February 28 - The Eastern Region of British Railways closes most of the former Midland and Great Northern Joint Railway.

=== March events ===
- March 28 - The Niagara, St. Catharines and Toronto Railway, the last interurban railroad in Canada, operates its last revenue service.

=== April events ===
- April 3 - Construction begins on Japanese National Railways’ Tōkaidō Shinkansen between Osaka and Tokyo.
- April 4 - Maine Central Railroad ends passenger service to Samoset destination hotel in Rockland, Maine.
- April 25 - Opening of the Saint Lawrence Seaway encourages improved ice-breaking on the Saint Lawrence River and initiates declining winter freight volume on Canadian railways east of Montreal.
- SAFEGE test monorail built in France.

=== May events ===
- May - The Ottawa, Arnprior and Parry Sound Railway runs its last train, ending 62 years of service.
- May 28 - A passenger train in Indonesia derails and falls into a ravine, killing 85 people and injuring 47 in the Tasikmalaya area of West Java; sabotage is suspected.

=== June events ===
- June 9 - The Chicago, Aurora and Elgin Railroad, interurban railway serving Chicago's western suburbs, ceases freight operations, thus bringing an end to all of the railroad's operations.
- June 15 - The Disneyland Monorail System built by Alweg opens, making it the first daily operating monorail system in the Western Hemisphere.
- June 21 - Soo Line 2719 hauls the last of Soo Line Railroad's steam locomotive-powered trains in revenue service on a round-trip excursion between Minneapolis, Minnesota, and Ladysmith, Wisconsin.

=== July events ===
- July 1 - Colorado Railroad Museum opens in Golden.
- July 14 - Pennsylvania Railroad (PRR) 0-6-0 number 5244, class B-6sb, becomes the last steam locomotive to operate on the PRR.
- July 18 - The last steam locomotive runs on the Nickel Plate Road as a pair of 0-8-0 switchers are called out to cover a traffic surge.
- July 27 - Southern Pacific Company opens new embankment replacing Lucin Cutoff trestle across Great Salt Lake, Utah.

=== August events ===
- August 25 - Baltimore and Ohio Railroad opens Arthur Kill Vertical Lift Bridge over Staten Island Sound in the United States.
- August 30 - Streetcar service in Montreal, Quebec, Canada is discontinued.

=== October events ===
- October 6 - The Carmelit, Haifa's underground funicular railway, opens.
- October 12 - First R28 (New York City Subway car) enters service, from the last batch of passenger cars that the American Car and Foundry Company is to build.
- October 28 - The Canadian National Railway line between St. Felicien and Chibougamau, Quebec, opens.

=== November events ===
- November 2 - The Pacific Electric Watts Line, then under operation by the Los Angeles Metropolitan Transit Authority, is discontinued. The service is replaced with buses.

=== December events ===
- December 1 - The Virginian Railway is merged into the Norfolk and Western Railroad.
- December 15 - Indian Railways introduces the first train under 25 kV AC traction between Rajkharswan and Dangoaposi stations of South Eastern Railway.
- December 29 - First section of Lisbon Metro (Metropolitano de Lisboa) opens in Lisbon, Portugal, first metro (subway) system in the country.

=== Unknown date events ===
- General Electric announces that it will begin manufacturing diesel locomotives on its own.
- Israel Railways officially withdraws all steam locomotives; the last, Baldwin-built Palestine Railways H class 4-6-0 no. 901, surviving in traffic into the following year.

== Births ==
=== May births ===
- May 1 - Ning Bin, Chinese signalling control systems engineer (died 2019).

== Deaths ==
=== August deaths ===
- August 26 - William Valentine Wood, President of the London, Midland and Scottish Railway 1941-8 (born 1883).
