= 1932 in rail transport =

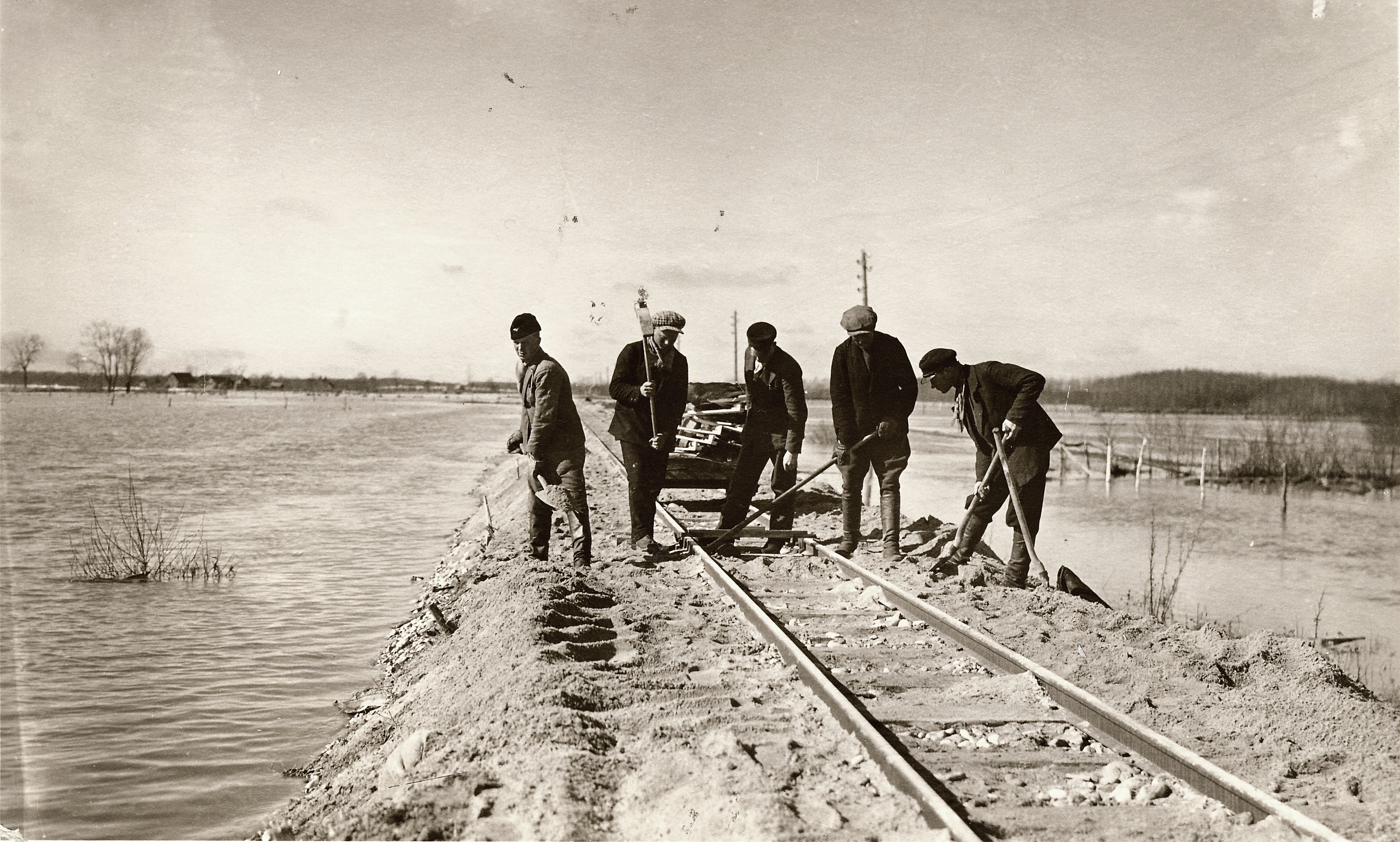
Rumba in 1932

This article lists events related to rail transport that occurred in 1932.

== Events ==
=== January events ===
- January 1
  - William Stanier succeeds Ernest Lemon as Chief Mechanical Engineer of the London, Midland and Scottish Railway.
  - Ralph Budd leaves the Great Northern Railway and becomes president of the Chicago, Burlington and Quincy Railroad.

=== March events ===
- March 15 - The last passenger service run of the Pontchartrain Rail-Road, in operation for over a century.
- March 24 - The first radio broadcast from a moving train occurs when New York City station WABC broadcasts from a Baltimore and Ohio Railroad train operating in Maryland.
- March 31 – Tokyo Yokohama Electric Railway Line, from Shibuya Station in Tokyo via Musashi-Kosugi Station in Kawasaki, Kanagawa to Sakuragichō Station in Yokohama, is officially completed in Japan (as the predecessor of Tokyu Toyoko Line).

=== April events ===
- April 20 - The first completely air-conditioned sleeping car trains begin operating on the Baltimore and Ohio Railroad.
- April - The Atlantic City Railroad (predecessor to the Pennsylvania-Reading Seashore Lines) purchases the Stone Harbor Railroad.

=== May events ===
- May 24 - Nigerian Government Railways complete the 787 m (861 yd) road–rail Benue Bridge at Makurdi on its Eastern Line, replacing a train ferry.

=== June events ===
- June 6 - The Great Western Railway's Cheltenham Spa Express passenger train (popularly known as the Cheltenham Flyer) sets a new speed record as 4-6-0 locomotive Tregenna Castle hauls it from Swindon to London Paddington, 77 1/4 miles (124.3 km), at an average speed of 81.7 mph (131.5 km/h).

=== August events ===
- August 20 - The Unanderra – Moss Vale railway line of the New South Wales Government Railways in Australia is opened.
- August 31 – Pacific Electric Arrowhead Line service is discontinued.

=== September events ===
- September - The Great Western Railway accelerates its Cheltenham Spa Express between Swindon and London Paddington to a scheduled 65 minutes, giving an average speed of 71.3 miles per hour (114.7 km/h) over the whole trip, the world’s first train to be scheduled at over 70 miles per hour (110 km/h).
- September 10 - The IND Eighth Avenue Line, at this time the world's longest subway line (31 miles (50 km)), begins operation in Manhattan.
- September 11 - Canadian operations end on the International Railway (New York – Ontario).

=== December events ===
- December 6 – Nippo Line, Kokura of Kitakyushu via Oita to Kagoshima route officially completed in Kyushu Island, Japan.
- December 29 - “Twentieth Century” a play by Hecht and MacArthur about the New York Central Railroad's 20th Century Limited opens on Broadway.
- December 31 - The last steam-powered Southern Belle passenger train operates on the Southern Railway; the train's equipment will be replaced with electric multiple unit cars the next day.

=== Unknown date events ===
- The Southern Pacific Railroad gains 87% control of the Cotton Belt Railroad (St. Louis Southwestern Railway).
- Angus Daniel McDonald succeeds Paul Shoup as president of the Southern Pacific Company, parent company of the Southern Pacific Railroad.
- Hale Holden steps down as Chairman of the Executive Committee for the Southern Pacific Company. With Holden's departure, this position is eliminated. Holden then assumes the position of Chairman of the Board of Directors for the company.
- The Atchison, Topeka and Santa Fe Railway reduces train frequencies on its subsidiary Grand Canyon Railway from twice daily to once daily.
- The Lake Shore Electric Railway in Ohio declares bankruptcy.
- New Zealand Railways introduces K class 4-8-4 steam locomotives built in its Hutt Workshops.
- First Franco-Crosti boilered locomotive built, Belgian State Railways No 2096, an 0-6-2+2-4-2-4-2+2-6-0 articulated.
- An electric Children's railway operates in Gorky Park (Moscow), Soviet Union.

== Deaths ==
=== March deaths ===
- March 7 - William N. Page, American civil engineer who built the Chesapeake and Ohio Railway and the Virginian Railway (born 1854).
