= Soviet locomotive class E el =

E el
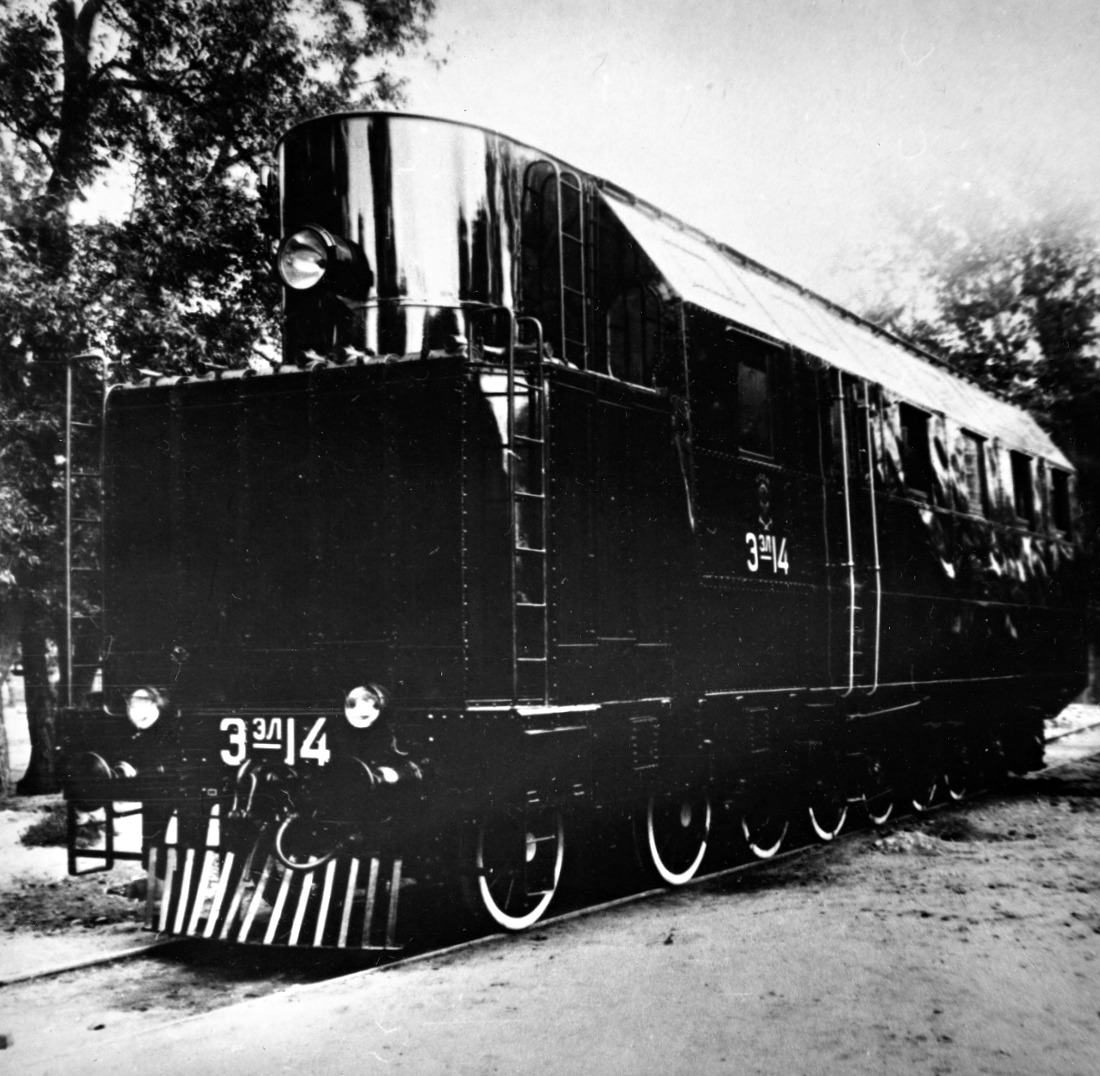
- Diesel-electric locomotive class E el-14
Type and origin
- Power type: Diesel-electric
- Builder: E el-5: Krupp; E el-9: Kolomna Works; E el-12: Kolomna Works
- Build date: 1931-1941
Specifications
- Configuration
  - UIC: 2-Eo-1
- Loco weight: E el-5: 134 t (132 long tons; 148 short tons)(?); E el-9: 140 t (138 long tons; 154 short tons); E el-12: 138 t (136 long tons; 152 short tons)
- Prime mover: E el-5: MAN diesel E el-9: Uncertain; E el-12: Russian built diesel
- Traction motors: Five 140 kW (190 hp) Brown Boveri
- Transmission: Diesel-electric
Performance figures
- Power output: E el-5: 1,200 hp (890 kW) at 450 rpm E el-9: Uncertain; E el-12: 1,050 hp (780 kW) at 425 rpm
Career
- Number in class: 46

Class E el (Cyrillic script: Ээл) was a Soviet diesel-electric locomotive class built between 1931 and 1941. There were three sub-classes but all were very similar. E el-5 was a prototype built in Germany in 1931. E el-9 was a prototype built in the Russian SFSR in 1932. E el-12 was also built in the RSFSR and went into series production. It had the highly unusual 2-Eo-1 wheel arrangement.

== Engine ==
The prime mover was a six-cylinder four stroke diesel engine. The E el-5 had a German built MAN engine giving 1,200 hp (890 kW) at 450 rpm. The E el 12 had a Soviet built engine, based on the German design, giving 1,050 hp (780 kW) at 425 rpm. It is uncertain which engine was used in the E el-9.

== Electrical equipment ==
There were five 140 kW Brown Boveri traction motors, connected in parallel. Innovations in the E el-5 included forced ventilation for the traction motors, field weakening for high speed running and rheostatic braking. The rheostatic braking was excluded from the Soviet built locomotives, to save weight, but they still weighed several tons more than the E el-5.

== Disposal ==
None of the class is known to have been preserved.
