= Kolomna Locomotive Works =

Russian locomotive manufacturer

- Native name: АО «Коломенский завод»
- Type: Joint-stock company
- Traded as: None
- Industry: Transport machine engineering
- Founded: 1863
- Founder: Amand Struve
- Headquarters: Kolomna, Moscow Oblast, Russia
- Key people: Vladimir Karpov, general director
- Products: Diesel locomotives, electric locomotives, diesel engines, electric motors
- Revenue: $22 million (2015)
- Number of employees: 6 426
- Parent: Transmashholding
- Website: www.kolomnadiesel.com

The Kolomna Locomotive Works (Russian: Коломенский завод, romanized: Kolomensky zavod) is a major producer of railway locomotives as well as locomotive and marine diesel engines in Russia. The plant started production in 1869 with a freight steam locomotive, one of the first in Russia. In the Russian Empire, Kolomna was one of the few producers in Russia. During this period, 139 types of steam locomotives were designed. As of 2015, the company is now a part of Transmashholding.

== Overview ==
The main activities of the company are: design, manufacturing and service of diesel engines (medium-speed diesel engines and diesel generators for diesel locomotives, power plants, heavy trucks, ships), mainline locomotives (passenger and freight), DC passenger electric locomotives.

The Kolomna plant is the only Russian producer of passenger locomotives, the creator of the first domestic examples of the main high-speed passenger EP200 AC locomotives, passenger DC electric EP2K, freight locomotives 2TE70. TEP70 passenger locomotives (along with modifications and TEP70 TEP70BS) provide much of the passenger traffic on non-electrified sections of the railways of Russia and CIS countries. The Kolomna plant is the largest Russian supplier of medium speed engines with an output from 450-5000 kW

== History ==
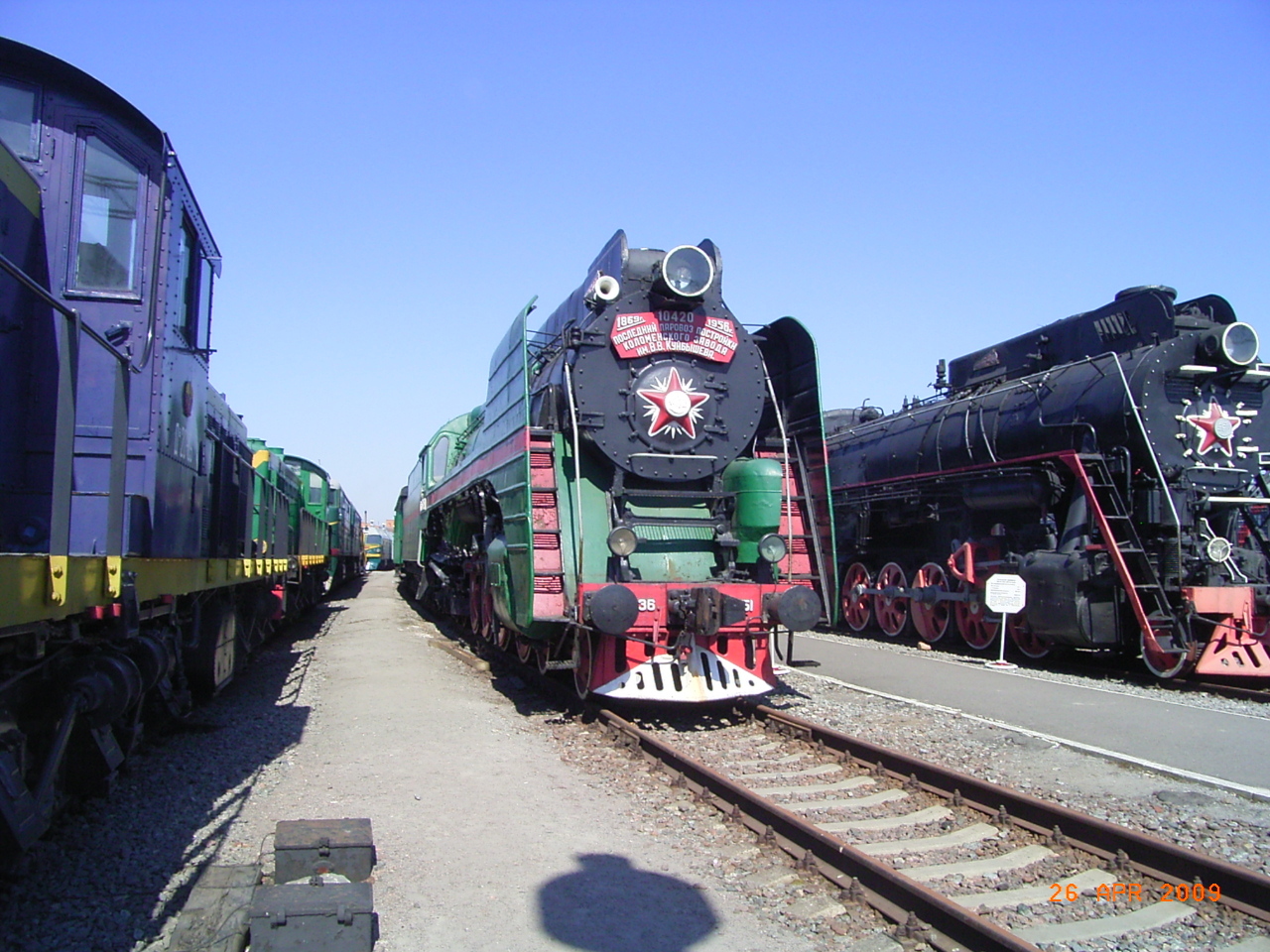
Last steam locomotive built

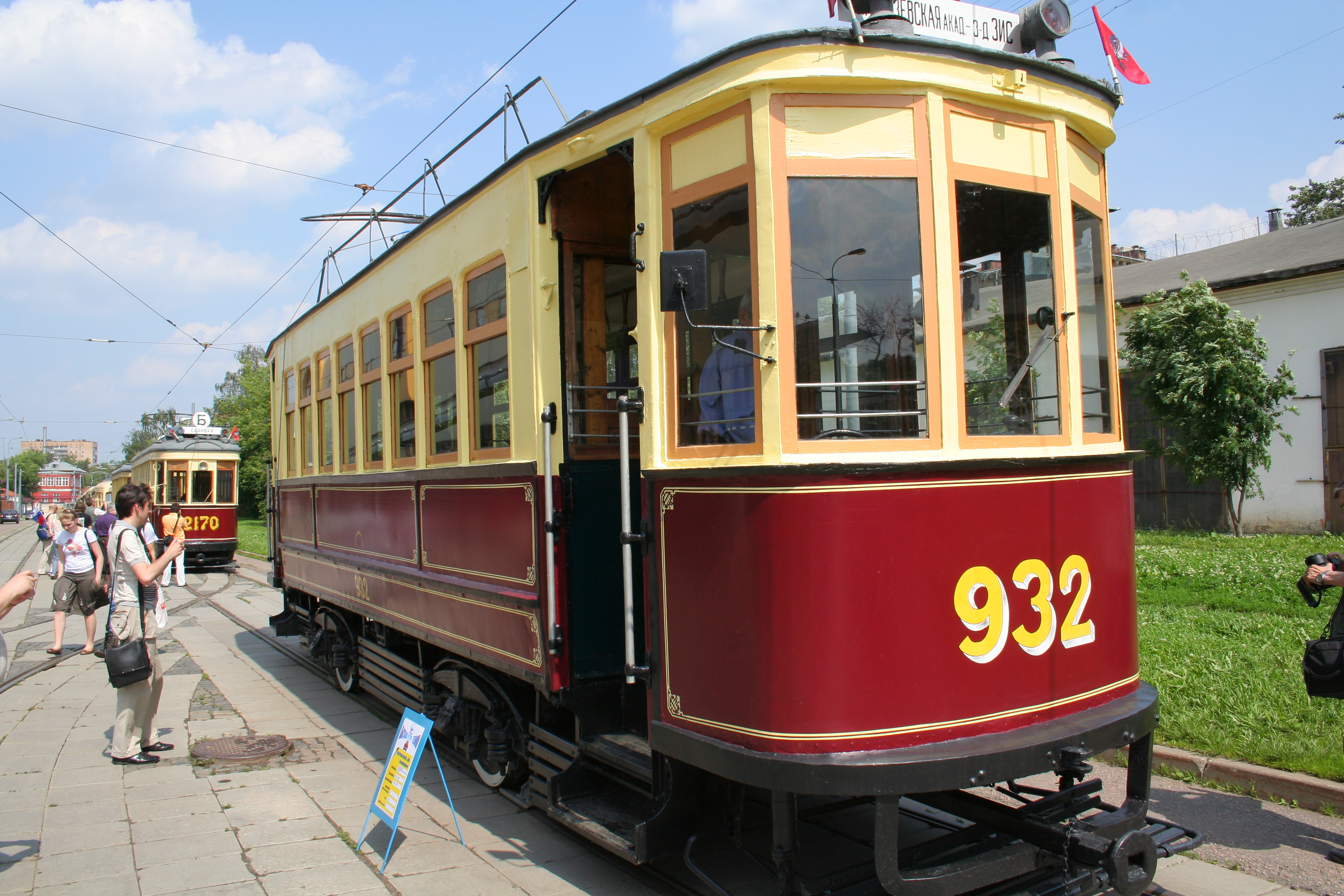
Tram BF Kolomna factory production of the 1910s

The factory was founded in 1863 at Kolomna by military engineer Amand Struve under the name Mechanical Engineering and Foundry Plant Struve Brothers. It was the first production plant for steel bridge structures for railways. In the second half of the 19th century, the plant began to build locomotives, cars, riverboats and traction engines. In 1866 his brother Gustav joined the management, and the company name was changed to Plant Engineers Struve Brothers. In 1871 the company name was changed to Kolomna Machine-Building Plant. In 1935 the plant was named V.V. Kuybyshev Locomotive Factory.

The plant in Kolomna built the first Russian three-axle locomotive T-Series (1870), the world's first ship with a diesel engine "the Kolomna Diesel" (1907) and the first production Soviet diesel locomotive E el.

In the first years of Soviet power the plant manufactured (in small quantities) locomotives, wagons, streetcars and diesel engines. In 1931 the plant began to produce diesel locomotives and in 1932, in conjunction with the plant "Dinamo", electric locomotives of the VL19 series.

Prior to World War II (1941 - 1945), the plant produced steam locomotives, diesel locomotives, electric locomotives, diesel engines, tunnelling shields for subways, turbines, tenders and condensers for steam locomotives. During the war, the plant provided for the needs of the front. It repaired tanks, built armoured trains and manufactured ammunition. In 1943 the plant resumed production of steam locomotives and diesel engines. In November 1953 the plant produced its ten thousandth locomotive.

In 1956 the factory began serial production of diesel locomotives and diesel engines for locomotives, ships, submarines and diesel power plants. Passenger locomotives TEP60 and TEP70 began to perform the lion's share of passenger traffic on non-electrified lines in Russia, Belarus and Kazakhstan.

At the end of 1934 Kolomna Locomotive Works laid down three submarines of the Shchuka class under the numbers 313, 314 and 315. These were completed in the spring of 1937 and towed to the "Red Sormovo" factory in Nizhny Novgorod (presumably along the Oka River).

== Honours ==
The plant was awarded the Order of Lenin (1939), Order of the Red Banner of Labour (1945) and Order of the October Revolution (1971).

== Timeline ==
- Steam Locomotive T-Series (1870-1915), freight and passenger steam locomotives for Russian and Soviet railways with wheel arrangements 0-6-0, 2-6-0 and 0-6-2
- E el (1932-1941), the serial diesel-electric freight locomotive with Ward Leonard control. Electrical equipment by Brown Boveri
- VL19 (1932-1938), main freight DC electric locomotive. This was the first and (until March 1953) the only serial electric locomotive design which was created in the Soviet Union
- TE3 (1956-1973), twelve-axle (type 2 (30-30)) freight locomotive of 2 × 2000 hp. In the 1960s this was the major driving force for non-electrified railways, replacing steam locomotives
- TEP60 (1960-1985), passenger diesel locomotive.
- TEP70 (1973-2006), passenger diesel locomotive.
- TEP70BS (2006-current), modernized version of the TEP70
- EP200 (1996), experimental high-speed AC electric locomotive. Two examples released in 1996. Maximum speed of 200 km / h.
- TEP80 (1988-1989), experimental passenger diesel locomotive. Two locomotives in this series were built

Locomotive TEP80-0002 set a world record for locomotive speed. The record is 271 km / h (1993). The locomotive, with a commemorative inscription, is now in the museum at Varshavsky railway station, St. Petersburg. The second locomotive, also with a commemorative inscription, is located in Novosibirsk museum of railway equipment. The record was set by driver Mankiewicz Alexander on October 5, 1993, but is not listed in the Guinness Book of World Records and is declared by the manufacturer.

- 2TE70 (2004-2010), a freight diesel locomotive with two six-axle sections. This is derived from passenger locomotives TEP70 and TEP70BS and is designed to haul freight trains weighing up to 6,000 tons.

== Production ==
- 47LN8 D1 D4, 6 8 mws 32 48, D28 32 28 34, 36 45, 8DR (9D 11D ?), 43 47/68

38K8 38V8 w8v28 38 - 24 34 - 34 44, MAN 42BM 45
f6v m6v 49 48 - 4046 4648 4860, BW 24,5/40

- D37, D38, D39, D9 D42 D43
- D40 D45
- D200, D50, D100
- D60 70 80
- D41 D47
- D42 D43, D49 10D49 V16, 16D49 V16
- 20SD500 V20 10000 hp, D300

D500 16SD500 V16, V12 for locomotives

== Gallery ==
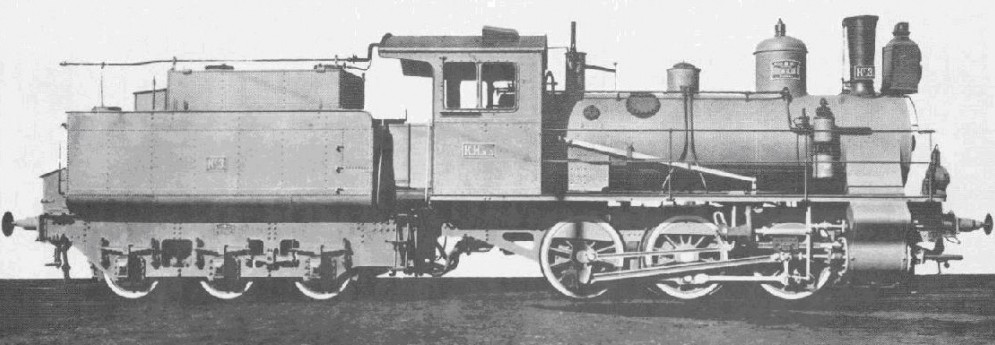
Russian steam locomotive T series, type 132 by Kolomna Works

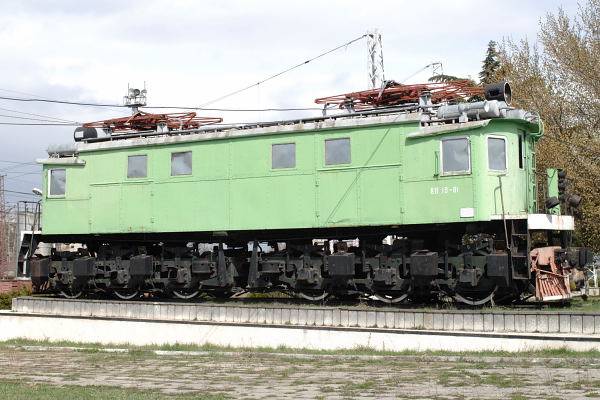
Electric locomotive class VL19

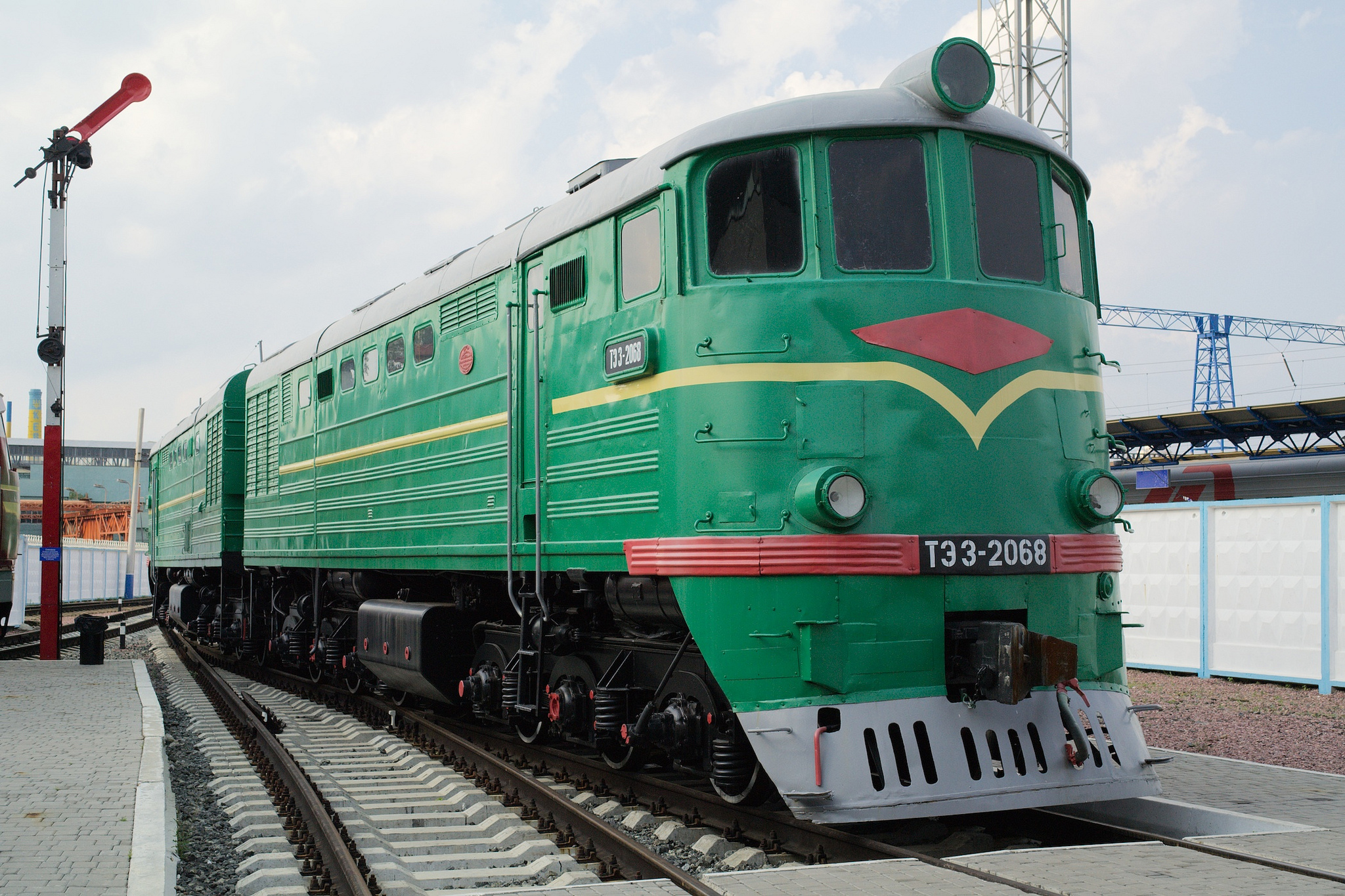
Diesel locomotive class TE3

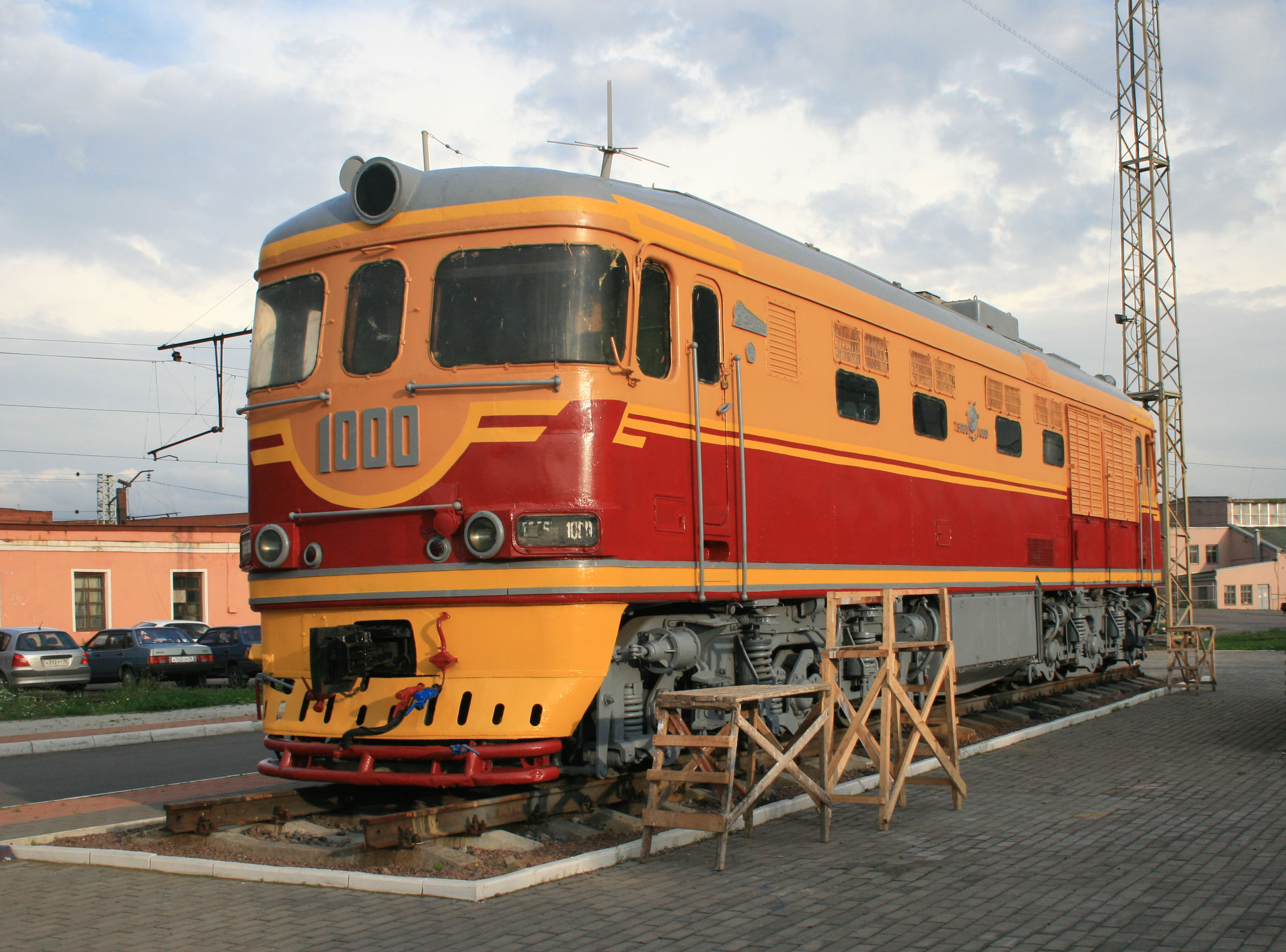
Diesel locomotive TEP-60 in passenger train depot Petersburg Mosc

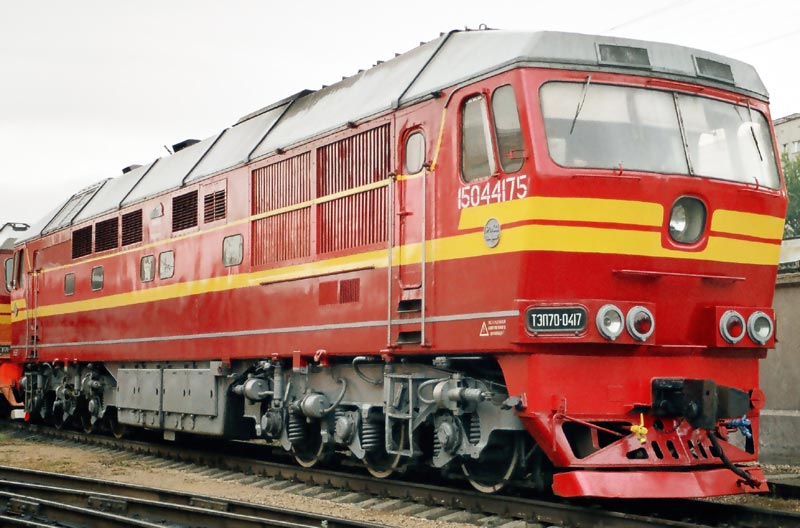
Diesel locomotive class TEP70

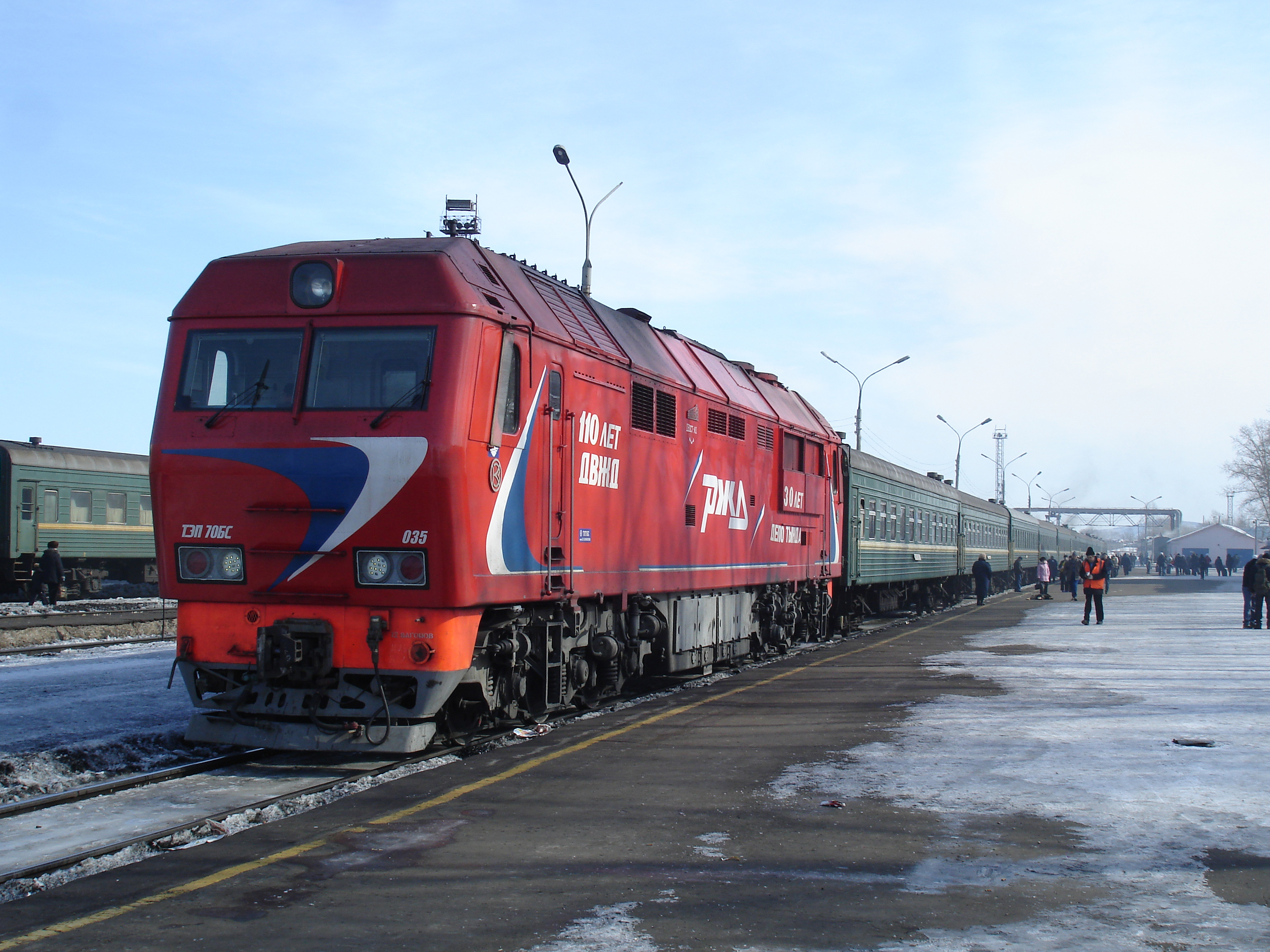
Russian diesel locomotive TEP70BS (ТЭП70БС) on Komsomolsk-on-Amur station

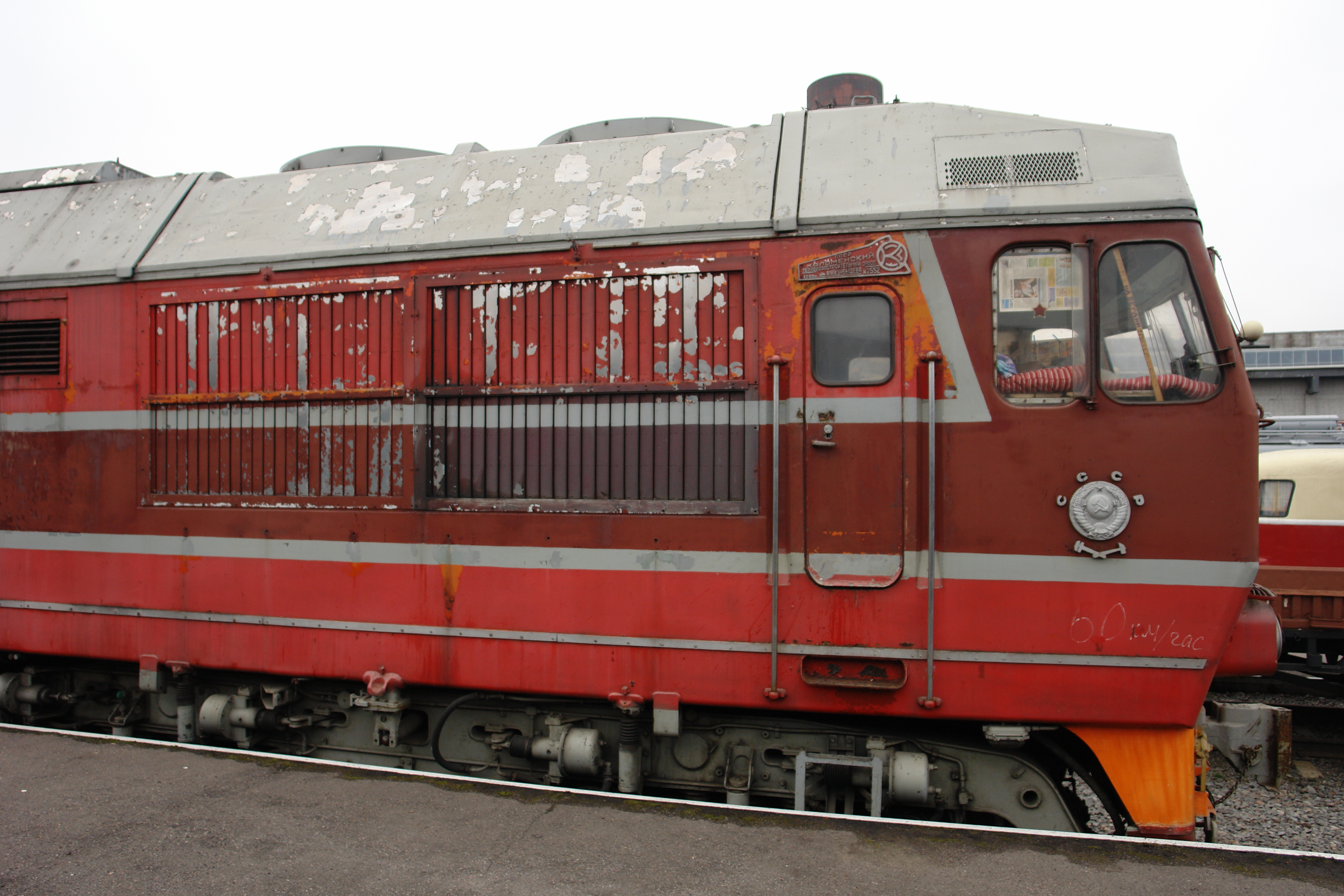
Diesel locomotive class TEP80
