= 1975 in rail transport =

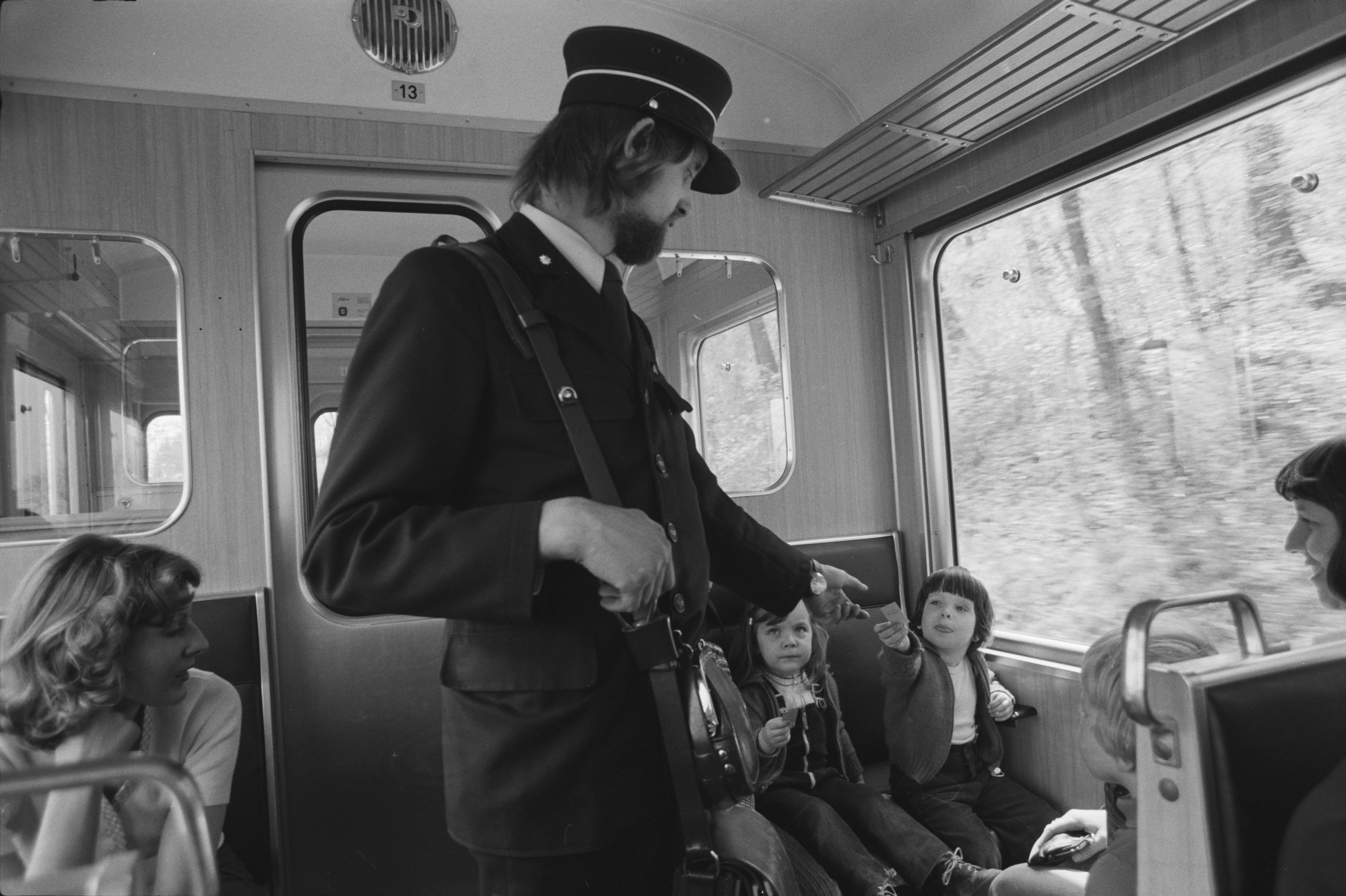
Conductor of the Sihltal-Zürich-Uetliberg railway in 1975.

This article lists events related to rail transport that occurred in 1975.

== Events ==
=== January events ===
- January 2 – A bomb blast at Samastipur in India fatally injures Lalit Narayan Mishra, Minister of Railways, who is visiting in order to declare the broad gauge line to Darbhanga open.
- January 20 – The 1974 Anglo-French Channel Tunnel scheme is abandoned.

=== February events ===
- February 22 – Tretten train disaster: A head-on collision near Tretten station in Norway kills 27.
- February 28 – Moorgate tube crash on the London Underground: A train accelerates into a dead-end tunnel at Moorgate station killing 43.

=== March events ===
- March 10 – In Japan:
  - Second phase of the San'yō Shinkansen high-speed rail line opens between Okayama and Fukuoka, bringing the system to the country's second island, Kyushu. Travel time between the two cities is reduced to 2 hours 45 minutes, and from Fukuoka to Tokyo to 6 hours.
  - The Kosei Line, a commuter route between Yamashina Station in Kyoto and Tsuruga opens, with Osaka-Kanazawa and Niigata express trains, changed from the route via Hikone and Nagahama.

=== April events ===
- April 1 – The second American Freedom Train tour begins, powered by newly restored Southern Pacific 4449, in Wilmington, Delaware. See also American Freedom Train - 1975-76 station stops.
- April 4-7 – MBTA Orange Line rerouted from Charlestown Elevated to Haymarket North Extension
- April 16 – In Portugal, Decree-Law 205-B/175 is published, nationalising the Companhia dos Caminhos de Ferro Portugueses.
- April 26 – In Japan, Keikyu extends from Miurakaigan to Misakiguchi, enabling rail service from central Tokyo further into the Miura Peninsula.

=== June events ===
- June 6 – An overnight northbound passenger train from London, England, bound for Glasgow, Scotland, does not receive warning of a temporary speed restriction resulting in the Nuneaton rail crash.
- June 8 – Two trains collide on a single-track stretch between Lenggries and Munich due to a dispatcher's error. 41 die and 122 are injured.

=== July events ===
- July 1 – Australian National Railways Commission takes over assets of Commonwealth Railways.
- July 18 – Barcelona Sants railway station opens.
- July 19 – Hatton Cross tube station opens, the first stage of the extension of London Underground's Piccadilly line to London Heathrow Airport.

=== August events ===
- August 5 – The first Amfleet passenger cars enter service on the Northeast Corridor. They are Amtrak's first new intercity passenger cars and the Budd Company's last.
- August 10 – British Rail's Advanced Passenger Train achieves 245 km/h (152.3 mph) between Goring and Uffington on the Western Region.
- August 24‒31, Rail 150 rolling stock exhibition at Shildon railway works celebrating 150 years since opening of Stockton and Darlington Railway on 27 September 1825.
- August 25 – The Victoria Falls Conference between Rhodesian Prime Minister Ian Smith and the United African National Council is held in a South African Railways coach on the Victoria Falls Bridge.
- August 31 ‒ Rail 150 ‒ steam locomotive cavalcade between Shildon railway station and Heighington railway station

=== September events ===
- September 24 – Scottish-built ex-État 140C 287 on hire to CFTA works a train from its depot at Gray, Haute-Saône, to Sainte-Colombe, the last commercial steam-hauled working on French railways.
- September 27 – Official opening of the National Railway Museum in York, England.

=== October events ===
- October 19 – US-built SNCF Class 141R 1187 of Vénissieux depot works a special return working between Lyon and Veynes, the last steam-hauled passenger train operated by SNCF.
- October 24 – The first through passenger train over the TAZARA Railway arrives in Dar es Salaam, marking completion of this Chinese-funded 1,860 km (1,160 mi) 1,067 mm (3 ft 6 in) gauge link between Tanzania and Zambia.

=== November events ===
- November – English-built SNCF Class 140C 38 works a freight train between its depot at Gray and Chalindrey, the last steam-hauled train operated by SNCF.

=== December events ===
- December 2 – A train hijacking takes place at the village of Wijster in the Netherlands by activists wanting to endorse the self-proclaimed Republic of South Maluku in the Maluku Islands. Hostages Hans Braam, Leo Bulter and Bert Bierling are shot. The activists surrender on December 14.
- December 14 – Japanese National Railways runs its last official steam-hauled passenger train, from Muroran to Iwamizawa on Hokkaido with JNR Class C57-135.

=== Unknown date events ===
- The Chicago, Rock Island and Pacific Railroad files its third and final bankruptcy.
- Last steam locomotive operated by State Railways of Finland.
- As a result of the Independent Safety Board Act's passage the previous year, the United States National Transportation Safety Board becomes a completely independent agency, severing all organizational ties to the national Department of Transportation and all of its modal agencies.
