= 1962 in rail transport =

This article lists events related to rail transport that occurred in 1962.

== Events ==
=== January events ===
- January 4 – New York City Subway introduces a driverless train.
- January 8 – The Harmelen train disaster, the worst railway accident in the history of the Netherlands, occurs when one passenger train driver misses a warning signal and passes a red signal to collide nearly head-on with another passenger train. 93 are killed.
- January 28 – The last lines of streetcars in Washington, D.C., end operations.

=== February events ===
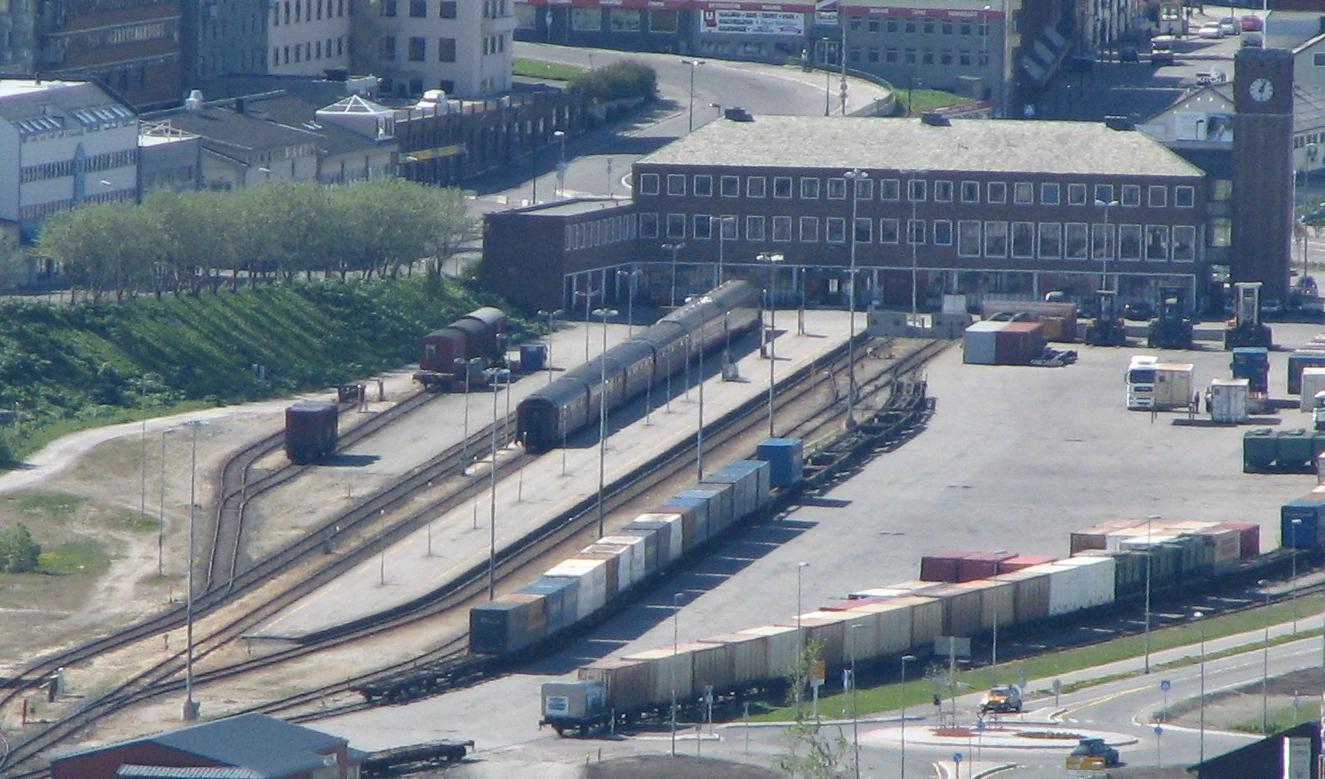
Bodø railway station

- February 1 – The Nordland Line in Norway is completed and opened to Bodø.

=== March events ===
- March 15 – Canadian Pacific Railway receives authorization to discontinue passenger train service between Ottawa and Chalk River.
- March 23 – In Tokyo, Japan, the Marunouchi Line branch is extended from Nakano-fujimicho to Honancho.

=== May events ===
- May 3 – Mikawashima train crash in Japan kills 160.
- May 22 – SNCF in France completes electrification from Strasbourg through to Paris.
- May 23 – Drilling for the new Montreal Metro system commences.
- May 31
  - Toei Subway Line 1 (present-day Asakusa Line) opens between Asakusabashi and Higashi-Nihonbashi in Tokyo, Japan.
  - The Hibiya Line is extended north from Minami-senju to Kita-senju and south from Naka-okachimachi to Ningyocho. Through service to the Tobu Isesaki Line also begins.

=== June events ===
- June 30 – The Norfolk and Western Railway discontinues electrification on the former Virginian Railway.

=== July events ===
- July 17 – Canadian National Railway debuts a new paint scheme on its transcontinental passenger train, the Super Continental.

=== August events ===
- August 29 – In Tokyo, Japan, the Hibiya Line begins service between Kasumigaseki and Higashi-ginza.

=== September events ===
- September 1 – Port Authority Trans-Hudson assumes operation of the Hudson & Manhattan Railroad.
- September 7 – The Buckfastleigh, Totnes and South Devon Railway, in England, is closed by the Western Region of British Railways.
- September 30 – Toei Subway Line 1 (present-day Asakusa Line) is extended from Higashi-Nihonbashi to Ningyocho in Tokyo, Japan.

=== October events ===
- October 3 – British railway unions call a one-day strike in protest of workshop closures.
- October 11 – Colorado and Southern Railway 2-8-0 number 641 pulls the last steam locomotive-operated regular daily service revenue train on a standard gauge railroad in the United States when it pulls a train from Leadville to Climax, Colorado.
- October 28 – The Lake Street Elevation of the Chicago Transit Authority rail system is placed in operation, relocating 2.6 miles of the former at-grade portion of the route onto the Chicago and North Western Transportation Company's elevated right-of-way, with new stations at Central, Austin, Ridgeland, Oak Park and Harlem. The improvement eliminated a total of 22 grade crossings in Chicago, Oak Park and Forest Park.

=== Unknown date events ===
- Railway extended to Wau, South Sudan.
- New York Central purchases the first electric multiple unit passenger cars from Pullman-Standard for use on the Metro-North railroad.
- Union Pacific 3985, a Challenger locomotive, is removed from revenue service on the Union Pacific Railroad.
- First Indian Railways Class WDM-2, from ALCO, introduced. The class will eventually exceed 2,800 units.
- ALCO closes the ALCO Thermal Products Division (formerly Brooks Locomotive Works) plant in Dunkirk, New York.
- Harry A. deButts is succeeded by D. William Brosnan as president of the Southern Railway.
- The Northern Refrigerator Car Line is combined with Merchants Despatch.

== Deaths ==
- February 2 – Ralph Budd, president of the Great Northern Railway 1919–1932 and Chicago, Burlington and Quincy Railroad 1932–1949 (b. 1879).
