= 1961 in rail transport =

This article lists events related to rail transport that occurred in 1961.

== Events ==
=== January events ===
- January – The American Car and Foundry Company delivers the last passenger car it will build, an R28 (New York City Subway car).
- January 4 – Lokomotivbau Elektrotechnische Werke delivers the first electric locomotives built in the German Democratic Republic to Deutsche Reichsbahn.
- January 16 – Eastern Region of British Railways takes delivery of D9001, the first production "Deltic" class diesel locomotive.

=== February events ===
- February 4 – Lehigh Valley Railroad discontinues its Black Diamond passenger train service.
- February 6 – The first automatic level crossing on British Railways is installed at Spath, Staffordshire.

=== March events ===
- March 27 – Black demonstrators stage a "ride-in" on Charleston, South Carolina, streetcars.
- March 28 – Tokyo Metro Hibiya Line opens between Minami-senju and Naka-okachimachi. The first railway line in the world without any lineside signals.

=== April events ===
- April – D5151, the first Sulzer Type 2 diesel locomotive, later British Rail Class 25, is completed at B.R. Darlington Works.
- April 9 – The Long Beach Line, the last operating service of the former Pacific Electric Railway, is replaced by buses.
- April 25 – Osaka Loop Line, circular line system start operation in Japan.

=== May events ===
- May 24 – The Milwaukee Road's Olympian Hiawatha passenger train makes its final run between Chicago, Illinois, and Seattle, Washington.
- May 28 – The Orient Express makes its last run between Paris, France, and Bucharest, Romania.

=== June events ===
- June – The last of the Bradshaw railway timetables, first published by George Bradshaw in 1839, is published in Britain.
- June 1 – Dr Richard Beeching takes office as chairman of the British Transport Commission and British Railways Board.
- June 17 – A Paris–Strasbourg train derails near Vitry-le-François; 24 are killed, 109 injured.

=== August events ===
- August 31 – Portland, Maine's Union Station is demolished to make room for a shopping plaza.

=== September events ===
- September 23 – Maritime, Coal Railway and Power Company, in Nova Scotia, ceases operations.
- September 30 – Southern Pacific Railroad closes the Centerville (SP station).

=== October events ===
- October 18 – General Motors Electro-Motive Division completes construction of the first GP30 diesel locomotive.
- October 26 – Two cars of a commuter train operated by Oita Traffic Company are involved in a mudslide during a massive rainstorm at Ōita, eastern Kyūshū, Japan, 31 killed, 36 injured. Most of the passengers are senior high school students.
- October 28 – Bangor and Aroostook Railroad ends passenger service.
- October – Work starts on demolition of Euston Arch in London.

=== November events ===
- November 20 – Union Pacific 844 makes its first excursion run following retirement from regular revenue service on the Union Pacific Railroad.

=== Unknown date events ===
- Atlantic Coast Line's headquarters are moved from Wilmington, North Carolina, to Jacksonville, Florida.
- Construction is completed on Mexico's Chihuahua al Pacífico which linked the city of Chihuahua, Chihuahua, to the town of Los Mochis, Sinaloa, near the Pacific coast.
- Nationalization of rail transport in Paraguay.
- The first eight DC powered VL10 (i.e. Vladimir Lenin class) freight locomotives built at Tbilisi.
- The introduction in Sweden of the first SJ T43 locomotives opens the way for the phasing out of steam power on Swedish railways.
- The world's last Mallet locomotive is built in Japan, BB84 for the Indonesian State Railway Corporation's 750 mm (2 ft 5 1/2 in) gauge Atjeh Tramway on Sumatra.

== Deaths ==
11 November - Behiç Erkin First Director General of the Turkish State Railways
