= Cheltenham Spa Express =

British named passenger train service

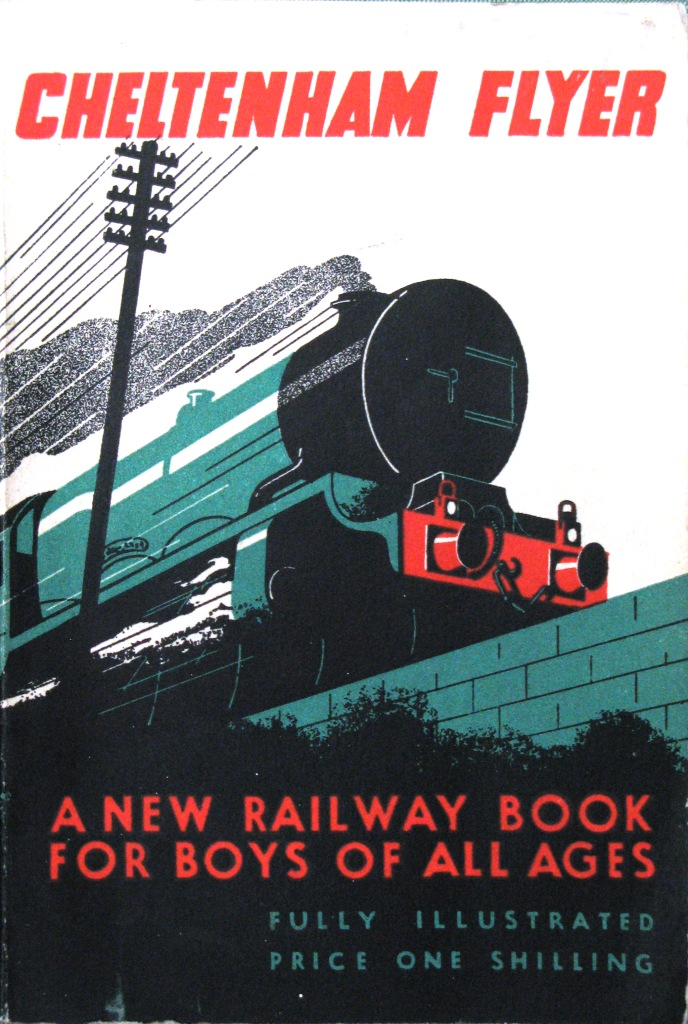
The GWR Cheltenham Flyer book was written to encourage 'boys of all ages' to take an interest in the railway.

The Cheltenham Spa Express is a British named passenger train service from Paddington station, in London, to Cheltenham Spa, in Gloucestershire, via Reading, Kemble, Swindon, Stroud, Stonehouse and Gloucester. During the 1930s, when operated by the Great Western Railway, the service was more popularly known as the Cheltenham Flyer.

== Background ==
Prior to the First World War, the Great Western Railway ran a high-speed service between Cheltenham and London, covering the 91 miles (146 km) from Kemble Junction to Paddington in 103 minutes. After the war, an additional stop was made at Swindon and the time for the 77 1/4 miles (124.3 km) to Paddington was scheduled at 85 minutes.

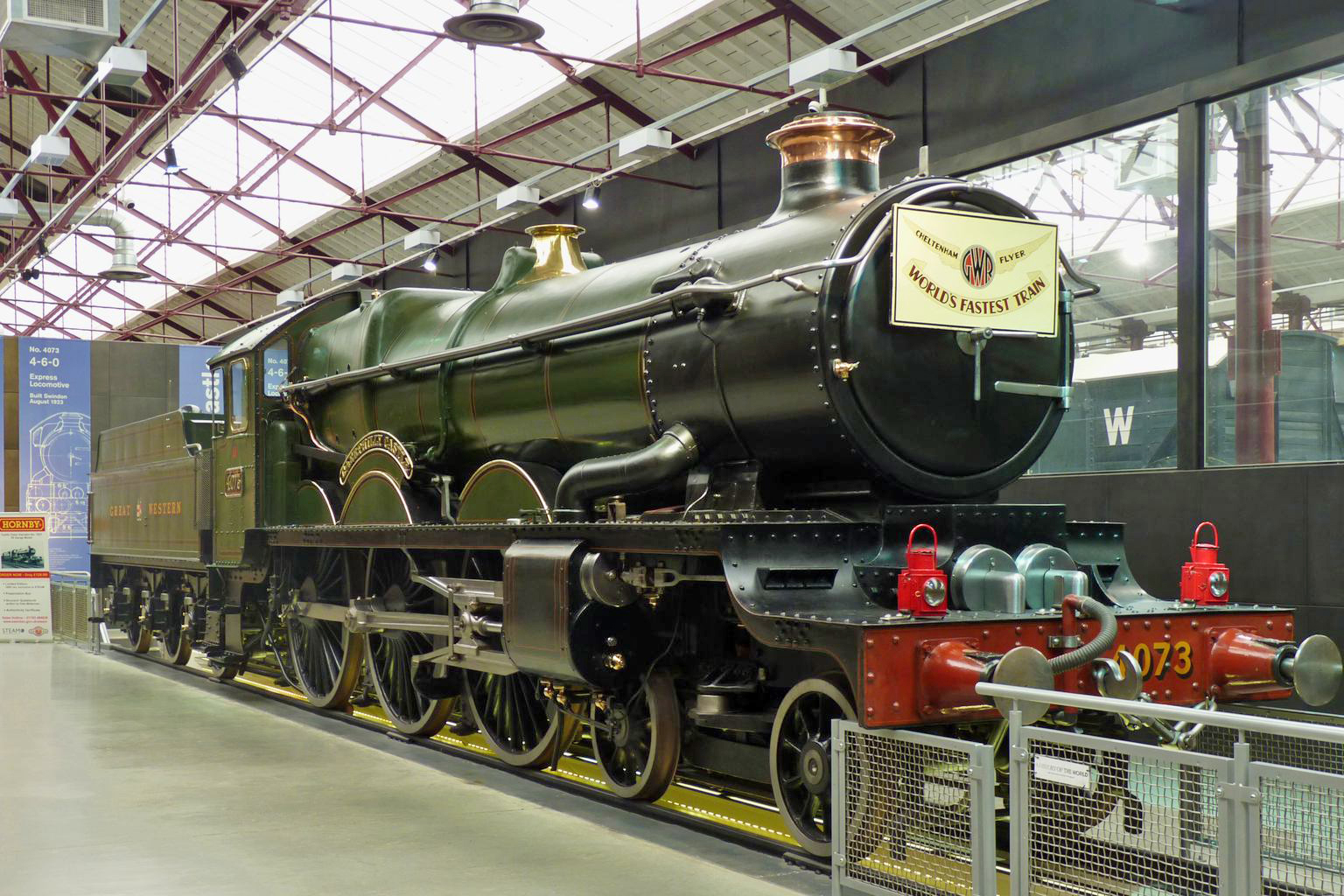
GWR Castle Class locomotive, Caerphilly Castle wearing a "Cheltenham Flyer" headboard

In 1923, the first batch of Charles Collett's GWR 4073 Castle Class 4-6-0 express engines entered service and enabled a significant improvement in timings. The name "Cheltenham Spa Express" was given to the service, which reached Paddington in 75 minutes from Swindon, an average speed of 61.8 miles per hour (99.5 km/h) making it the fastest start-to-stop scheduled service in Britain.

== Further developments ==
Fierce rivalry between the four main railway companies during the 1920s and 1930s to run the fastest train in the country, and therefore in the world, led to further accelerations to the service. In July 1929 the scheduled journey time became 70 minutes, an average speed of 66.2 miles per hour (106.5 km/h), and publicity proclaimed this as the fastest train in the world. By now the train had acquired its popular nickname of the "Cheltenham Flyer", although this was never adopted officially. Two years later in 1931 the Canadian Pacific Railway ran a train with a slightly faster schedule, taking the fastest train in the world title across the Atlantic, but the GWR train was again accelerated in July to an average speed of 69.2 miles per hour (111.4 km/h).

On Monday, 6 June 1932, the train broke railway speed records with a time of 56 mins 47 seconds at an average speed of 81.6 miles per hour (131.3 km/h). Such a journey speed had never been previously recorded, making this run the fastest railway run in the world. The train was hauled by Castle class 5006 Tregenna Castle and was crewed by Driver Harry Rudduck and Fireman Thorp of Old Oak Common shed.

In September 1932, (Note: some sources give 1931) the time from Swindon to London was further reduced to 65 minutes, giving an extraordinary average speed, for the time, of 71.3 miles per hour (114.7 km/h) over the whole trip of 77 1/4 miles (124.3 km). This was the first occasion in the history of railways that any train had been scheduled at over 70 miles per hour (110 km/h).

== Modern service ==
The unofficial title of Cheltenham Flyer, never used officially in timetables, ceased currency before World War 2 when trains elsewhere regularly achieved faster timings. The British Rail Western Region, as the successor to the Great Western Railway, continued to use the "Cheltenham Spa Express" brand until the 1960s, when it fell out of use. It was reintroduced in 1984, and continues to be used by the modern Great Western Railway train operating company.
