= Ning Bin =

Chinese control systems engineer and professor (1959–2019)

- 宁滨

President of Beijing Jiaotong University
- In office March 2008 – May 2019
- Succeeded by: Wang Jiaqiong

Personal details
- Born: 1 May 1959 Jishan County, Shanxi, China
- Died: 14 June 2019 (aged 60) Beijing, China
- Education: Northern Jiaotong University

Ning Bin (Chinese: 宁滨; 1 May 1959 – 14 June 2019) was a Chinese control systems engineer and professor who served as president of Beijing Jiaotong University from 2008 to 2019. He was elected an IEEE Fellow in 2014 "for contributions to train operation control systems" and was elected an academician of the Chinese Academy of Engineering in 2017. He was a four-time recipient of the State Science and Technology Progress Award and was awarded the Ho Leung Ho Lee Prize in 2016. He died in a traffic collision.

== Life and career ==
Ning was born on 1 May 1959 in Jishan County, Shanxi, China. After graduating from Northern Jiaotong University in 1982 with a bachelor of engineering degree in railway signalling, he was hired by the university as a faculty member. He later pursued graduate studies at the same university, earning his master's degree in 1987 and his doctor of engineering in 2005.

In 1997, Ning was appointed Vice President of Northern Jiaotong University. He was promoted to Executive Vice President of the university (by then renamed Beijing Jiaotong University) in 2004. From March 2008 until May 2019 he served as President of the university.

In December 2018, a laboratory explosion at Beijing Jiaotong University killed three students. After an investigation, Ning and eleven other university officials were found responsible for safety lapses and reprimanded in February 2019. On 5 May 2019, Ning was replaced by Wang Jiaqiong (王稼琼) as president. Two days later, the university established the Sichuan–Tibet Railway Research Center and Ning was appointed its director.

== Contributions and honours ==
Ning was a pioneer in developing digitized signalling systems of China's rapid transit networks and made significant contributions to the control systems of China's high-speed railway network and rapid transit networks. He also advised more than 50 doctoral and master's students.

Ning was elected a Fellow of the Institute of Electrical and Electronics Engineers (IEEE) in 2014 "for contributions to train operation control systems". He was elected an academician of the Chinese Academy of Engineering in 2017. He was also a fellow of the Royal Swedish Academy of Engineering Sciences and the Institution of Engineering and Technology (IET).

Ning was conferred the State Science and Technology Progress Award four times, including a Special Prize in 2015 for his contribution to the Beijing–Shanghai high-speed railway project, as well as three Second Class prizes (1998, 2009, and 2012). He was a recipient of the Zhan Tianyou Prize, the highest honour of China's railway industry. In 2016, he was awarded the Ho Leung Ho Lee Prize for Science and Technology Progress.

== Death ==
On 14 June 2019, according to a preliminary report released by the Beijing Police Department, Ning was the passenger in a Buick GL8 involved in an accident which occurred at 8:57 a.m. in Chaoyang District. When the Buick was changing lanes, it collided with another car coming from behind and rolled over, crossing the median to the opposite lane. Ning was declared dead after being rushed to hospital. The driver, surnamed Liu, survived. Ning was on his way to attend the World Transport Convention in Beijing when the accident occurred. He was 60.
