= 1862 in rail transport =

This article lists events related to rail transport that occurred in 1862.

== Events ==
=== January events ===
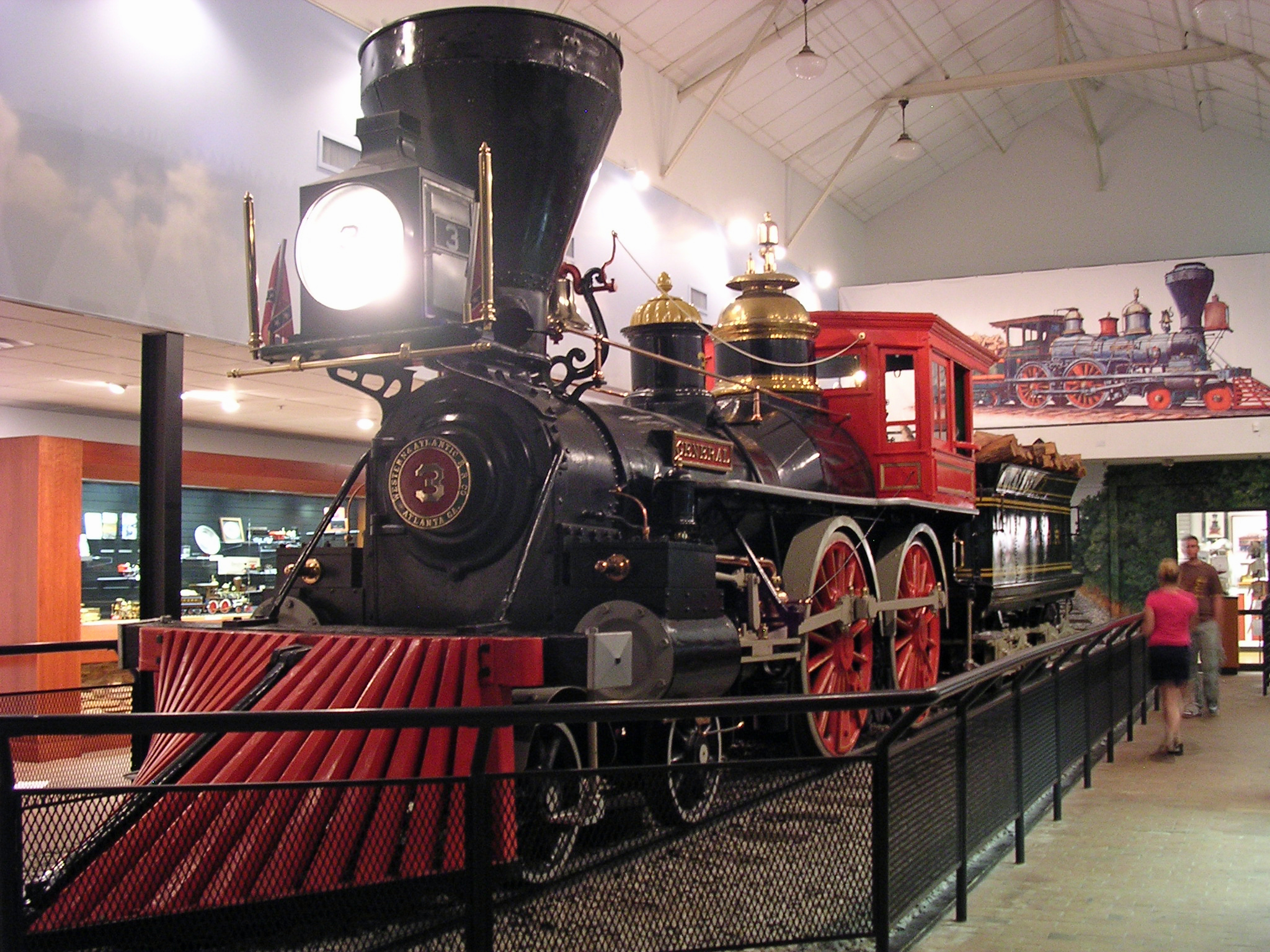
Western and Atlantic Railroad No. 3 The General

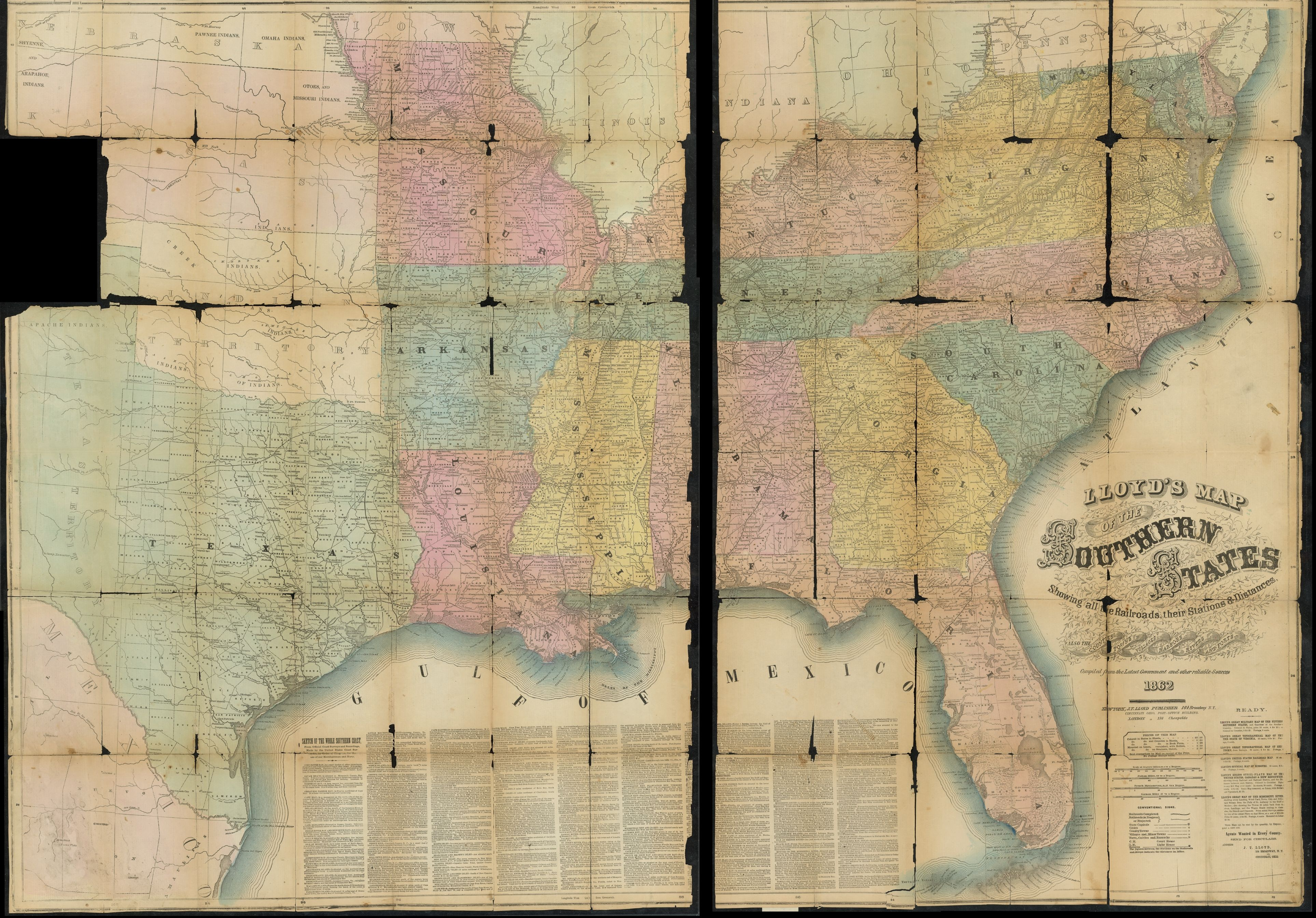
Lloyd's Map of the Southern States Showing All the Railroads, their Stations and Distances, 1862

- January – United States Military Railroad is authorized by the United States Congress to coordinate military operation of designated railroads during the American Civil War.
- January 1 - Maj. Gen. “Stonewall” Jackson marches his troops northward with the objective of disrupting traffic on the Baltimore and Ohio Railroad and C&O Canal; the Battle of Hancock is unsuccessful and the Confederate Army withdraws.
- January 31 – Opening of first rail line in the (at this time) Grand Duchy of Finland, between Helsinki and Hämeenlinna, on the Imperial Russian track gauge of 1,524 mm (5 ft).

=== February events ===
- February 1 – London and South Western Railway begins operations over an extension from Exeter to St Davids then via dual gauge track on the line from there to Crediton.

=== March events ===
- March 31 – The West Somerset Railway opens to passenger service on its line from a connection with the Bristol and Exeter Railway west of Taunton to Watchet.

=== April events ===
- April 12 – Andrew's Raiders steal The General and drive it north toward Chattanooga, Tennessee, with Western and Atlantic Railroad conductor William Fuller chasing it in the Great Locomotive Chase.
- April 27 - Herman Haupt appointed Colonel in charge of United States Military Railroad operations.
- April–September - William Powell Frith's oil painting The Railway Station, depicting London Paddington, goes on public display.

=== May events ===
- May 6 - The bill that will become the Pacific Railroad Act is passed by the United States House of Representatives.
- The 10.00 a.m. "Special Scotch Express", predecessor of the Flying Scotsman express train, first departs from London King's Cross for Edinburgh Waverley over the East Coast Main Line in Britain.
- Herman Haupt rebuilds the Potomac Creek Bridge in nine days.

=== June events ===
- June 1 – The 10:00 a.m. 'Royal Scot' express passenger train over the British West Coast Main Line between London Euston railway station and Glasgow first runs, although not yet named.
- June 16 – Cowes and Newport Railway opens the first section of passenger line on the Isle of Wight (England) between the two towns of its title (4.5 mi (7.2 km)).
- June 20 – The bill that will become the Pacific Railroad Act is passed by the United States Senate.
- June 28 – The St. Paul and Pacific Railroad makes an inaugural run led by the William Crooks, the first locomotive to run in the state of Minnesota.
- June 29 – Robert E. Lee has the first railway gun used in combat pushed by a locomotive over the Richmond and York River line (later part of the Southern Railway) for the Battle of Savage's Station.

=== July events ===
- July 1 - The Pacific Railroad Act is signed into law by President Abraham Lincoln.
- July 1 – The Union Pacific Railroad is incorporated.
- July 1 – Effective date of creation of Great Eastern Railway in England by amalgamation of Eastern Counties Railway, Eastern Union Railway, East Anglian Railway, Newmarket Railway and Norfolk Railway Companies.
- July 28 – The first railway post office car in North America is operated over the Hannibal and St. Joseph Railroad, the mail being transferred to stagecoach in St. Joseph, Missouri, for the rest of the journey to California.
- July 29 – The Washington and Georgetown Railroad Company began streetcar operations on Pennsylvania Avenue in Washington, D.C.

=== August events ===
- August 15 – Opening of first railroad in Algeria, from Algiers to Blida (48 km (30 mi) of 1445 mm gauge).

=== September events ===
- September 1 – James Staats Forbes becomes General Manager of the London, Chatham and Dover Railway.

=== October events ===
- October 3 – Kongsvingerbanen opens between Lillestrøm and Kongsvinger, Norway.
- October 13 – The Winchburgh rail crash in Scotland kills 15 people.
- October 28 – Portland gauge Maine Central Railroad is formed by merger of the Androscoggin and Kennebec Railroad with the Penobscot and Kennebec Railroad.

=== November events ===
- November 10 – Chicago and North Western Railway reaches Green Bay, Wisconsin.

=== December events ===
- December 9 – The Winona and St. Peter Railroad makes its first run between Winona and Stockton, Minnesota.

=== Unknown date events ===
- Cornelius Vanderbilt acquires the New York and Harlem Railroad.
- Bergisch-Märkische Eisenbahn opens Essen Hauptbahnhof station.
- Patna–Digha Ghat line opens in British India.

== Deaths ==
- March 2 – Frederick W. Lander, Chief Civil Engineer for the Pacific Railroad (b. 1822).
- September 18? – Septimus Norris, steam locomotive designer often credited as designing the first 4-6-0 (b. 1818).
