= 2TE70 =

Russian freight diesel locomotive

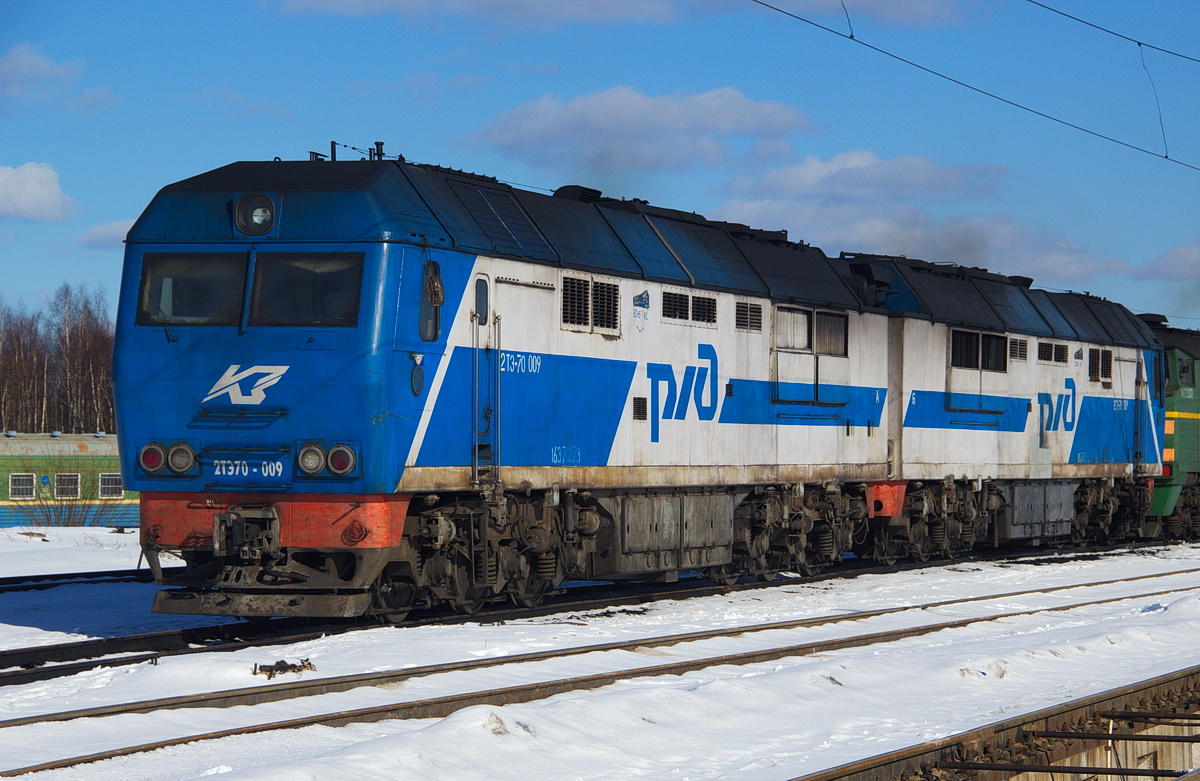
Type and origin
- Power type: Diesel-electric
- Build date: 2004–2007
Specifications
- Configuration
  - UIC: Co-Co+Co-Co
- Gauge: 1,520 mm (4 ft 11 27/32 in)
- Loco weight: 141 t (139 long tons; 155 short tons) per unit 282 t (278 long tons; 311 short tons) total
Performance figures
- Maximum speed: 110 km/h (68 mph)
- Power output: 2,942 kW (3,945 hp) per unit 5,884 kW (7,891 hp) total

The 2TE70 is a Russian main line dual unit freight diesel locomotive, rated at 5,884 kW (7,891 hp). It has AC/DC transmission and individual axle traction control and is designed to haul freight trains on the Russian Federation lines RŽD with 1,520 mm (4 ft 11 27/32 in) Russian gauge. The 2ТE70 Freight diesel locomotive with two six-axle sections shares main parts with the TEP70 and TEP70BS passenger diesel locomotives. Each section is rated at 2,964 kW (3,975 hp) and it is designed for running freight trains of up to 6,000 t (5,900 long tons; 6,600 short tons).

The 2TE70 also shares a number of components with the TEP70BS and TEP70U passenger locomotives.

== See also ==
- The Museum of the Moscow Railway, at Paveletsky Rail Terminal, Moscow
- Rizhsky Rail Terminal, Home of the Moscow Railway Museum
- Varshavsky Rail Terminal, Home of the Central Museum of Railway Transport, Russian Federation
- History of rail transport in Russia
