= 1930 in rail transport =

This article lists events related to rail transport that occurred in 1930.

== Events ==
=== January events ===
- January 1 – The Cincinnati, Hamilton and Dayton Railway, Indiana, Columbus and Eastern and the Lima-Toledo Railroad merge to form the Cincinnati and Lake Erie Railroad
- January 31 – Trains begin using the new elevated tracks and platform at Toronto Union Station.

=== February events ===
- February 15 – The Compagnie Internationale des Wagons-Lits operates the first Taurus Express between Istanbul and Baghdad, with road connection between Nusaybin and Kirkuk.
- February 18 – The Pullman Company buys the Osgood Bradley Car Company, which has been making trolley and other transit cars since 1833.
- February 24 – The Standard Steel Car Company is incorporated as a Pullman subsidiary.

=== March events ===
- March 13–14 – Blue Train Races: Woolf Barnato driving his Speed Six Blue Train Bentley saloon races Le Train Bleu from Cannes. He is parked at his London club before the train arrives at Calais Gare Maritime.
- March 29 – last scheduled train runs on the narrow gauge Northwestern Pacific Railroad.
- March 30 – Chesapeake and Ohio Railway inaugurates The Sportsman passenger service.

=== April events ===
- April 21 – The Turkestan–Siberia Railway is completed.

=== May events ===
- May 6 – The Drammen Line in Norway takes electric traction into use between Drammen and Brakerøya.

=== June events ===
- June 1 – The Great Indian Peninsula Railway introduces the Deccan Queen express over its newly electrified line between Bombay (Mumbai) and Poonah (Pune).
- June 16 – Hanwa Electronic Railway, Tennoji Station of Osaka to Wakayama Station route officially complete in Japan (a predecessor of JR Hanwa Line).
- June 20 – General Motors purchases Winton Engine, a major supplier of diesel locomotive prime movers.
- June 25 – The Glacier Express first runs between St. Moritz and Zermatt in Switzerland following completion of the metre gauge link between Brig and Visp.

=== July events ===
- July – The Atlantic City Railroad (a predecessor of the Pennsylvania-Reading Seashore Lines) purchases the Wildwood and Delaware Bay Short Line Railroad.
- July 8 – A demonstration Bennie Railplane monorail line is opened over an existing railway line at Milngavie near Glasgow in Scotland.

=== August events ===
- August 20 – The Kururi Line in Japan is regauged from 762 mm (2 ft 6 in) to 1,067 mm (3 ft 6 in).

=== October events ===
- October 1 – Somu Railroad Line, Ōmiya Station (Saitama) via Kasukabe and Kashiwa to Funabashi route is officially completed in Japan (as predecessor of the Tobu Urban Park Line (Noda Line)).

=== December events ===
- December 18 – Bombay Central station opened by Bombay, Baroda and Central India Railway.
- December 31 – General Motors buys Electro-Motive Corporation and combines it with Winton Engine to form General Motors Electro-Motive Division.

=== November events ===
- Southern Pacific Railroad opens the Benicia–Martinez drawbridge — it replaces the Solano, the largest rail ferryboat ever constructed.

=== Unknown date events ===
- General American Transportation Corporation assumes ownership of Swift Refrigerator Line.

== Births ==
=== February births ===
- February 3 – Charles S. Roberts, American railroad historian, is born (d. 2010).

=== Unknown date births ===
- Robert Bandeen, president of Canadian National Railway 1974–1982.
