= 1964 in rail transport =

This article lists events related to rail transport that occurred in 1964.

== Events ==
=== February events ===
- February 3 - New South Wales Tulloch double deck carriage stock debuts

=== April events ===
- April 6 - Freight transportation on Alaska Railroad between Fairbanks and Anchorage resumes after repairs from an earthquake that occurred on March 27.

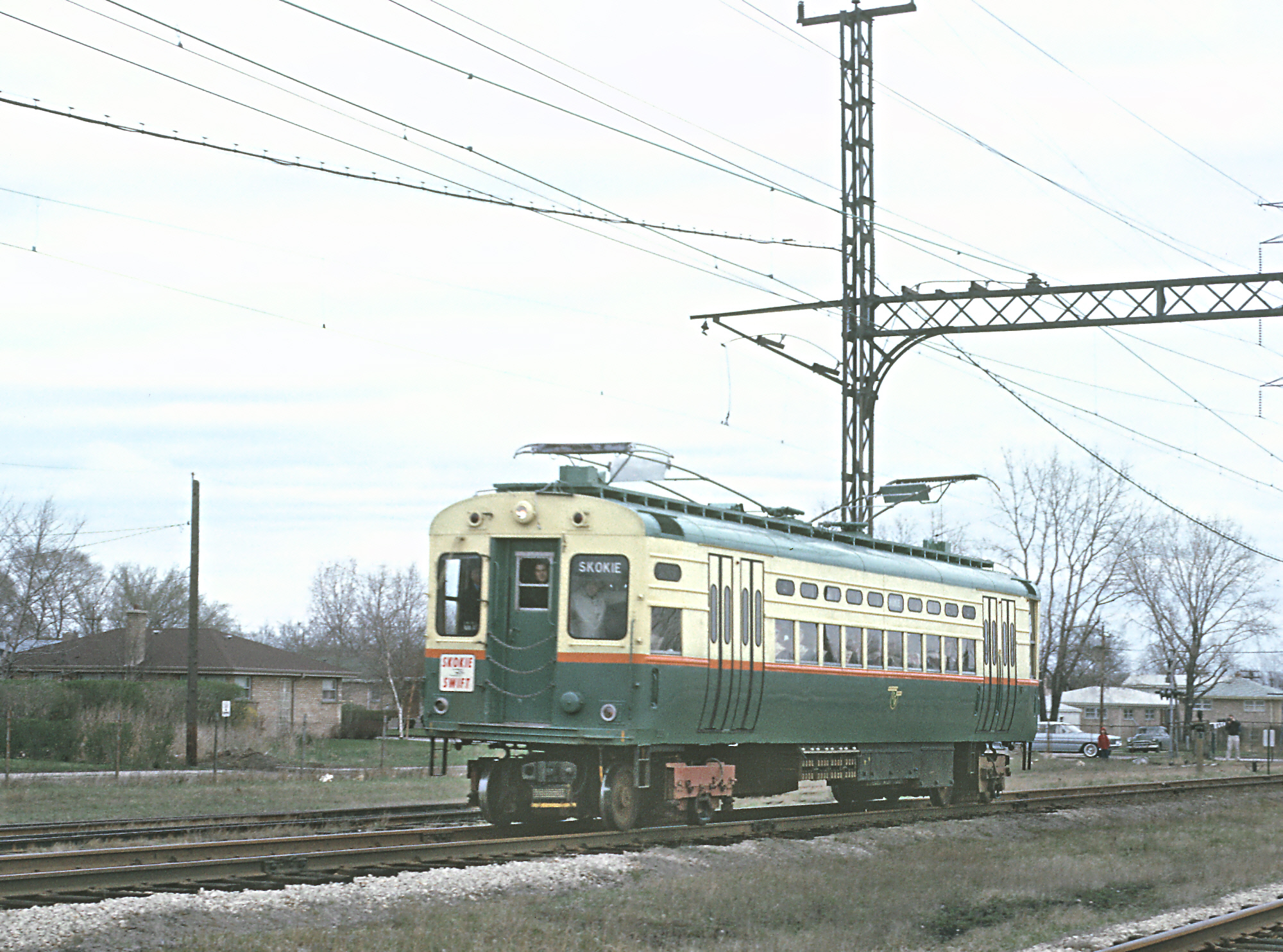
The Skokie Swift in service, May 1964

- April 20 - The Skokie Swift high-speed rapid transit route of the Chicago Transit Authority 'L' system begins service between the Howard Street Terminal in Rogers Park and Dempster Street in Skokie.
- April 29 - The Keiō Dōbutsuen Line in Japan opens.

=== June events ===
- June 6 - Southern Railway 4501 is taken down to Chattanooga, Tennessee for restoration by the Tennessee Valley Railroad Museum.
- June 15 - The 2000-series rapid transit cars (2001–2180), built by Pullman-Standard of Chicago, Illinois, are placed in service on the Chicago "L" system. These cars represent the first generation of the Chicago Transit Authority High Performance Family.
- June 19 - United States President Lyndon B. Johnson presides over the groundbreaking ceremonies for Bay Area Rapid Transit (BART).
- June 30 - End of regularly scheduled steam locomotive service on the narrow gauge White Pass and Yukon Route.

=== July events ===
- July - The Urban Mass Transportation Act of 1964 becomes law in the United States.

=== August events ===
- August 3 - Massachusetts Bay Transportation Authority is established, replacing the MTA

=== September events ===
- September 14 - R32 (New York City Subway car) debuts
- September 30 - The Railway Preservation Society of Ireland is formed.

=== October events ===
- October 1
  - The Tōkaidō Shinkansen high-speed route commences operation in Japan; it is the first of many Shinkansen routes to be constructed.
  - Toei Subway Line 1 (present-day Asakusa Line) opens between Shimbashi and Daimon in Tokyo, Japan. This is the fifth extension of the line since it opened in 1960.
- October 9 - End of District line service to Hounslow on the London Underground.

=== November events ===
- November 5 - Swaziland Railway opened.
- November 15 - Shin-Sayama Station on what becomes the Seibu Railway's Seibu Shinjuku Line in Sayama, Saitama, Japan, is opened.

=== December events ===
- December 19 - The Elektrische Bahn Stansstad–Engelberg in Switzerland reopens with a connection to the national rail network at Hergiswil and conversion to 15 kV AC railway electrification as the Luzern–Stans–Engelberg railway line.
- December 23 - In Tokyo, Japan, the Tozai Line begins service between Takadanobaba and Kudanshita.

=== Unknown date events ===
- The Wabash, Nickel Plate Road, Pittsburgh and West Virginia and Akron, Canton and Youngstown railroads are all merged into the Norfolk & Western.
- Swiss Federal Railways introduces its Re 4/4^{II} series electric locomotives, built by SLM.
- Double-deck cars introduced on suburban railways in Sydney, Australia.
- Benjamin Biaggini succeeds Donald Russell as president of the Southern Pacific Company, parent company of the Southern Pacific Railroad.
- Donald Russell assumes the position of chairman of the Board of Directors of the Southern Pacific Company, a position that was nonexistent since Hale Holden's departure in 1939.
- ALCO is purchased by the Worthington Corporation.
- The above-ground portion of Pennsylvania Railroad's Pennsylvania Station in New York City is demolished to make room for Madison Square Gardens, but the tracks remain in use today.
- Robert A. "Bob" Emerson succeeds Norris Roy Crump as president of Canadian Pacific Railway.
