= EP200 =

Class of Russian electric locomotives

ЭП200 EP200
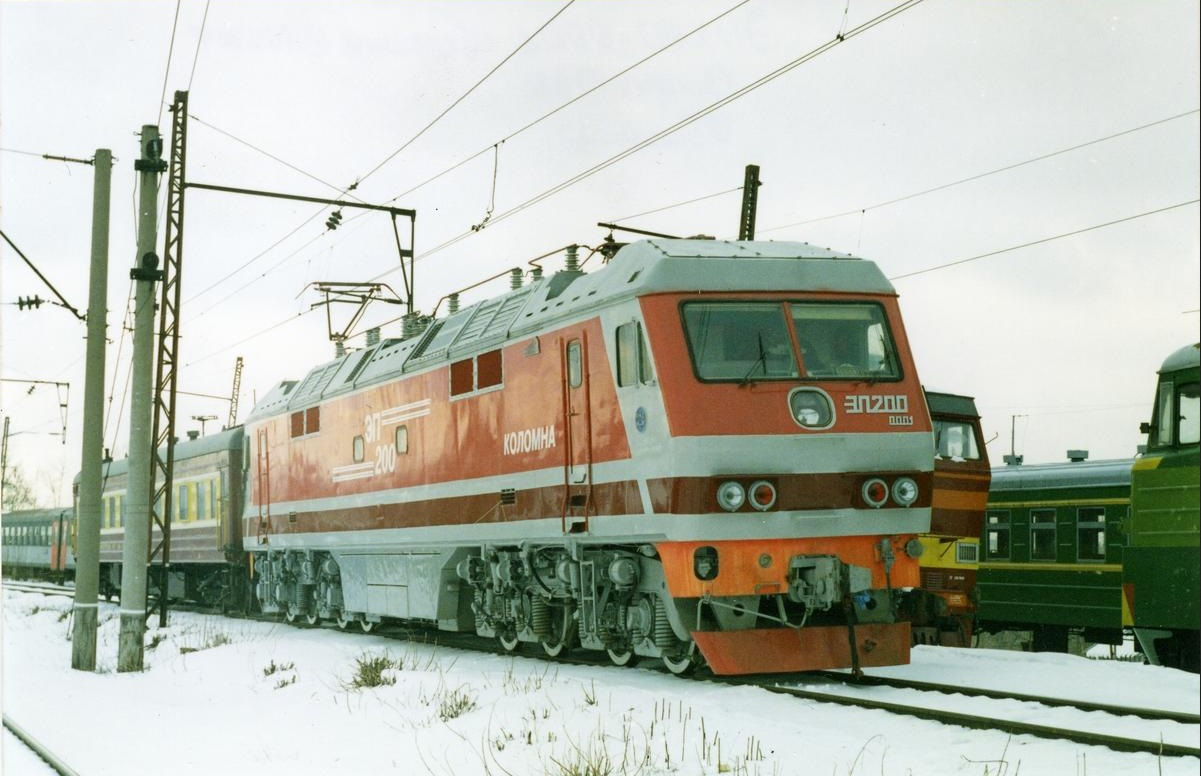
Type and origin
- Power type: Electric
- Builder: Transmashholding
- Build date: 1996
Specifications
- Configuration
  - AAR: B+B-B+B
- Gauge: 1,520 mm (4 ft 11 27/32 in) Russian gauge
- Loco weight: 180 t (177.2 long tons; 198.4 short tons)
- Electric system/s: 25 kV 50 Hz AC Catenary
- Current pickup(s): Pantograph
Performance figures
- Maximum speed: 200–250 km/h (124–155 mph)
- Power output: 8,000 kW (10,730 hp)

The EP200 (Russian: ЭП200) passenger AC electric locomotive has 8,000 kilowatts (10,730 hp) of power and design speed of up to 200 kilometres per hour (120 mph). The underframe with two unique four-axle wheel trucks coupled with support - frame suspension of commutator-less motors and traction gear boxes (two-level bogie swing suspension with cylindrical spiral springs and hydraulic oscillation dampers) ensure high riding properties and dynamic characteristics of the EP200 Passenger Electric Locomotive.

== See also ==
- The Museum of the Moscow Railway, at Paveletsky Rail Terminal, Moscow
- Rizhsky Rail Terminal, home of the Moscow Railway Museum
- Varshavsky Rail Terminal, St.Petersburg, Home of the Central Museum of Railway Transport, Russian Federation
- History of rail transport in Russia
