= Sig Alert =

Incident disrupting road traffic

Sig alert, Sig-alert or Sigalert in California, as well as other parts of the United States, means an incident that significantly disrupts road traffic. The term was originally the name of a pioneering system of automated radio broadcasts regarding traffic conditions, introduced in the 1950s and named after its inventor, Loyd Sigmon.

A Sigalert is defined by the California Highway Patrol (CHP) as "any unplanned event that causes the closing of one lane of traffic for 30 minutes or more". In practice, the term refers to a notice of such a closure issued by the CHP, and Sigalerts are posted on the CHP website, broadcast on radio and television stations throughout California, and signaled to motorists via electronic message signs on the freeways. Caltrans defines it as any traffic incident that will tie up two or more lanes of a freeway for two or more hours.

The term was added in 1993 to the New Shorter Oxford English Dictionary. In practice, there is no standard spelling; the CHP website uses "SIG Alerts" and "Sigalert" while Caltrans uses "Sig-Alert".

== Origin ==
SigAlerts originated in 1955 with the Los Angeles Police Department (LAPD). By the early 1950s, the rapidly growing number of automobiles in Los Angeles had greatly increased the frequency and severity of traffic accidents and jams. Radio stations reported traffic conditions, but the LAPD refused to call radio stations with this information, so each station would call the LAPD. Using the telephone to distribute the information tied up telephone lines and forced officers to repeat the same information again and again.

In 1955, Loyd C. "Sig" Sigmon began developing a solution. Sigmon was executive vice president of Golden West Broadcasters (a company owned by singing cowboy Gene Autry). Sigmon had worked for Golden West's station KMPC 710 in 1941 but found himself in the United States Army Signal Corps during World War II, assigned to General Dwight D. Eisenhower's staff, in charge of non-combat radio communications in the European theater. Now, he proposed to apply his knowledge of complex radio networks to the situation in Los Angeles.

Sigmon developed a specialized radio receiver and reel-to-reel tape recorder. When the receiver picked up a particular tone, it would record the subsequent bulletin. At the time, the device cost about $600 (equivalent to $5,600 in 2018). The LAPD's chief, William H. Parker, was interested, though skeptical, warning the inventor, "We're going to name this damn thing Sigalert." More practically, he refused to use it unless the receivers were made available to all Los Angeles radio stations—it could not be a KMPC monopoly.

Initially, half a dozen stations installed Sigmon receivers that had "Sigalert" stamped on their side. When a message had been received and recorded from the LAPD, a red light, sometimes accompanied by a buzzer, would alert the radio stations' engineers. Depending on the nature of the problem, the engineer could air the police broadcast immediately, interrupting regular programming if necessary.

== Early use ==
One of the first major "Sigmon traffic alerts" was broadcast on January 22, 1956, causing a traffic jam. The alert described the derailment of a passenger train near Los Angeles' Union Station and requested any available doctors and nurses to respond to the scene. Too many doctors, nurses and sightseers drove there, making the situation worse. The first SigAlert was on Labor Day weekend in 1955, and some stories on the SigAlert conflate these two events.

At first, the LAPD issued about one alert a day, but soon other agencies were calling in messages they wanted broadcast, including rabid dog reports, gas leaks and even a ship collision in Los Angeles Harbor. A pharmacist who had made a potentially fatal error in filling a prescription took advantage of the system to warn the customer (who heard the SigAlert in time). It was also used to warn about the impending Baldwin Hills Dam collapse in 1963.

The term "Sigalert" was also used in Seattle, Washington in the late 1970s and early 1980s.

== Since 1969 ==
In 1969, when the CHP assumed responsibility for freeway traffic from the LAPD, it took control of the SigAlert system as well. It is now used throughout California and limited to traffic situations only. Messages are still broadcast, but most radio stations now read the information from the CHP's web service rather than rebroadcasting the police dispatchers' voices.

Caltrans also uses the term "Sig-Alert", and it has now come to be commonly defined as any traffic incident that will tie up two or more lanes of a freeway for two or more hours.

As of 2007 not all California radio stations use this term. For example, radio station KABC uses the term "KABC Traffic Alert", while radio stations KNX, KFI-AM, KRLA, KQED, and KCRW use the original term. Prior to KBIG’s rebrand to MyFM, KBIG named the alerts as “BIG Alerts”.

== See also ==
- SIGMET—an aviation weather advisory
