= Redondo Junction train accident =

1956 train crash on the Santa Fe Railroad in Los Angeles

Coordinates: 34°1′13″N 118°13′29″W

Redondo Junction train wreck

Details
- Date: January 22, 1956; 70 years ago 17:42
- Location: Los Angeles
- Country: United States
- Line: Surf Line
- Operator: Santa Fe Railroad
- Incident type: Derailment at junction
- Cause: Excessive speed

Statistics
- Trains: 1
- Deaths: 30
- Injured: 117

The Redondo Junction train wreck occurred at 17:42 on the evening of January 22, 1956, on the Santa Fe Railroad in Los Angeles. The accident happened at Redondo Junction, California, just southwest of Boyle Heights near Washington Boulevard and the Los Angeles River; it killed 30 people and injured 117 more. It was the first major disaster in the LA area covered on live television, and the worst train wreck in the city's history.

The train comprised two RDCs (Budd Rail Diesel Cars) which ran two return trips daily on the San Diegan (train numbers 80-83) between the more conventional streamliners. The service was very reliable although often overcrowded. Sixty-one-year-old Frank Parrish, the engineer on the fateful day was experienced on the line but was making only his second round trip on RDCs.

The train left Union Station fully loaded. After leaving the interlocking control of Mission Tower (signal box), the sharp curve of Redondo Junction (which had a speed limit of 15 mph or 24 km/h) was normally reached in six minutes; but the RDCs could reach the junction in only two. The tower man (signalman) at the junction saw the cars turn over onto their left sides as they approached the junction and slide with a shower of sparks, and then total darkness. He immediately called the emergency services who were quickly on the scene along with railroad staff from the adjacent Los Angeles Roundhouse. The accident prompted one of the first Sig alerts to be raised by the Los Angeles Police Department, causing mass traffic jams as medical staff and sightseers rushed to the scene. The media soon arrived and within an hour of the wreck KTLA Channel 5 was broadcasting live from the scene; floodlights to illuminate the grisly scene being donated by nearby movie studios. In all 30 people were killed and a further 117 injured.

The enquiry into the accident estimated that the speed of the train to be 69 mph (111 km/h) at the point it derailed, far in excess of the 15 mph (24 km/h) speed limit. No charges were ever brought against Frank Parrish, who admitted sole responsibility for the accident but claimed to have blacked out before the accident. He did not run a train again and took early retirement from the railroad.

After being repaired the cars concerned, DC191 and DC192 were returned to service outside California, eventually ending up running Santa Fe's El Pasoan service between Albuquerque, New Mexico and El Paso, Texas. DC 191 has survived and as of January 2009 was being restored by the Pacific Railroad Society.
