= List of railway electrification systems =

This is a list of the power supply systems that are, or have been, used for railway electrification.

Note that the voltages are nominal and vary depending on load and distance from the substation.

As of 2023, many trams and trains use on-board solid-state electronics to convert these supplies to run three-phase AC traction motors.

Tram electrification systems are listed here.

== Key to the tables below ==
- Volts: voltage or volt
- Current:
  - DC = direct current
  - # Hz = frequency in hertz (alternating current (AC))
    - AC supplies are usually single-phase (1φ) except where marked three-phase (3φ).
- Conductors:
  - overhead line or
  - conductor rail, usually a third rail to one side of the running rails. Conductor rail can be:
    - top contact: oldest, least safe, most affected by ice, snow, rain and leaves. Protection boards are installed on most top contact systems, which increases safety and reduces these affections.
    - side contact: newer, safer, less affected by ice, snow, rain and leaves
    - bottom contact: newest, safest, least affected by ice, snow, rain and leaves

- Red background indicates voltages no longer in use on the indicated location

== Systems using standard voltages ==
Voltages are defined by two standards: BS EN 50163 and IEC 60850.

=== Overhead systems ===
==== 600 V DC ====
Country	Location	Name of system	Notes
Worldwide		Many tram systems	This voltage is mostly used by older tram systems worldwide but by a few modern ones as well. See List of tram systems by gauge and electrification.
Germany	Trossingen	Trossingen Railway	
Hungary	Budapest	Budapest Metro	Line M1
Japan	Chōshi, Chiba	Chōshi Electric Railway	
Japan	Kyoto, Kyoto	Eizan Electric Railway	
Japan	Kanagawa	Enoshima Electric Railway	
Japan	Matsuyama, Ehime	Iyotetsu Takahama Line	
Japan	Shizuoka, Shizuoka	Shizuoka Railway	
Romania	Sibiu county	Sibiu-Rășinari Narrow Gauge Railway	Part of the former Sibiu tram line
Spain	Madrid	Madrid Metro	Lines 1, 4, 5 and 9. In process to be converted to 1500 V
United Kingdom	Crich, England	National Tramway Museum	
United States	Boston	MBTA subway	Green and Mattapan Lines, the at-grade section of Blue Line northeast of Airport station
United States	Chicago	Chicago "L"	Yellow Line, a segment of the former Chicago North Shore and Milwaukee Railroad (1916-1963). It was fully converted to third rail in 2004, matching the other Chicago "L" lines. Evanston Branch (now known as Purple Line) ran overhead catenary until being converted to third-rail in 1973.
United States	Cleveland	RTA Rapid Transit	Red Line
United States	Iowa	Iowa Traction Railway	

==== 750 V DC ====
Country	Location	Name of system	Notes
Worldwide		Many tram systems	This voltage is used for most modern tram and light rail systems. See List of tram systems by gauge and electrification
Austria	Upper Austria	Local lines of Stern & Hafferl	Also listed as having 1500 V and 600 V lines
Austria; Switzerland	Rhine / Lake Constance	Internationale Rheinregulierungsbahn	Construction railway for the regulation works of the river Rhine near its outfall into Lake Constance, now preserved. The river forms the border between Austria and Switzerland, and the railway operated in both countries.
Canada	Toronto	Toronto Subway	Line 5 Eglinton and Line 6 Finch West
Germany	Karlsruhe to Bad Herrenalb with a branch to Ittersbach	Albtalbahn	Railway of the Upper Rhine
Hong Kong	Hong Kong	MTR	MTR Light Rail
Japan	Hamamatsu, Shizuoka	Enshū Railway	
Japan	Hakone, Kanagawa	Hakone Tozan Railway Line	Between Hakone-Yumoto and Gōra
Japan	Ehime	Iyotetsu Yokogawara Line and Gunchū Line	
Japan	Yokkaichi, Mie	Yokkaichi Asunarou Railway Utsube Line, Hachiōji Line	
Japan	Mie	Sangi Railway Hokusei Line	
Netherlands	The Hague, Zoetermeer, Rotterdam and adjacent cities	Randstadrail	
Netherlands	Rotterdam	Rotterdam Metro	North of Capelsebrug station overhead wires
Philippines	Metro Manila	Manila LRT Line 1 (Manila Light Rail Transit System)	Between Dr. Santos and Fernando Poe Jr.
Philippines	Metro Manila	Manila MRT Line 3 (Manila Metro Rail Transit System)	Between North Avenue and Taft Avenue
Switzerland	Canton of Aargau	Menziken–Aarau–Schöftland railway line	
Republic of China (Taiwan)	New Taipei	New Taipei Metro: all Light Rail lines	
Turkey	Adana	Adana Metro	
Turkey	Istanbul	Istanbul Metro	Line M1 and M5

==== 1,200 V DC ====
Country	Location	Name of system	Notes
Cuba	Havana – Matanzas and branches	Ferrocarriles Nacionales de Cuba	Originally (and still known as) the Hershey Electric Railway
Germany	Lusatia		900 mm (2 ft 11 7/16 in) gauge mining railways in the lignite district
Spain	Barcelona, Catalonia	Barcelona Metro	Uses an overhead conductor rail/beam system
Spain	Palma – Sóller, Mallorca	Sóller Railway	
Switzerland	Canton of Bern / canton of Solothurn	Aare Seeland mobil (ASm)	
Switzerland	Dietikon, canton of Zurich – Wohlen, canton of Aargau	Bremgarten-Dietikon-Bahn	
Switzerland	Zurich – Esslingen, canton of Zurich	Forchbahn	Forchbahn proper only; Forchbahn trains access their Zurich terminus via the Zurich tram network, which is electrified at 600 V DC. The rolling stock is equipped to run off both voltages.
Switzerland	Lugano – Ponte Tresa, canton of Ticino	Ferrovia Lugano–Ponte Tresa (FLP)	
Switzerland	Frauenfeld, canton of Thurgau – Wil, canton of St. Gallen	Frauenfeld-Wil-Bahn	
Switzerland	Meiringen – Innertkirchen, canton of Bern	Meiringen–Innertkirchen Bahn	
United States	Baltimore–Annapolis, Maryland	Baltimore and Annapolis Railroad	1914–1950
United States	Los Angeles – Inland Empire, California	Pacific Electric Upland–San Bernardino	Operated 1914–1950. 600 V in city limits
United States	California	Sacramento Northern Railway	Operated 1910–1936. Converted to 1,500 V. The southern division was built by the Oakland, Antioch and Eastern Railway.
United States	East Bay, California	East Bay Electric Lines	1911–1941
United States	Oregon	Oregon Electric Railway	1912–1945

==== 1,500 V DC ====
Country	Location	Name of system	Notes
Argentina	Buenos Aires	Buenos Aires Metro	Lines A, C, D, E and H
Argentina	Buenos Aires	Tren de la Costa	Suburban line
Australia	Melbourne	Melbourne Suburban Railways	
Australia	Regional New South Wales	NSW TrainLink Intercity	Newcastle and Central Coast, Blue Mountains to Lithgow and South Coast to Kiama
Australia	Sydney	Sydney Trains	
Australia	Sydney	Sydney Metro	Metro North West & Bankstown Line (partially converted from Sydney Trains). Completely new lines Sydney Metro West and Sydney Metro Western Sydney Airport will use 25 kV 50 Hz AC
Bangladesh	Dhaka	Dhaka Metro Rail	MRT Line 6 (Dhaka Metro)
Brazil	São Paulo	São Paulo Metro	Lines 4 and 5
Bulgaria	Sofia	Sofia Metro	Line 3 Gorna Banya – Hadzhi Dimitar
Canada	Montreal	Réseau express métropolitain	Incl. Deux-Montagnes line that was built by CNoR in 1918 as 2400 V DC, converted to 3000 V DC in the 1980s, converted to 25 kV 60 Hz in 1995 by the MTQ, being converted to light-metro standard and 1500 V DC
Canada	Ottawa	O-Train	Line 1 only; Line 2 is diesel LRT.
China	Beijing	Beijing Subway	Lines 6, 14 and 16
China	Changchun	Changchun Rail Transit	Lines 1 and 2
China	Changsha	Changsha Metro	
China	Changzhou	Changzhou Metro	
China	Chengdu	Chengdu Metro	Except lines 17, 18 and 19
China	Chongqing	Chongqing Rail Transit	Lines 1, 4, 5, 6, 10 and Loop Line
China	Dalian	Dalian Metro	
China	Dongguan	Dongguan Rail Transit	
China	Fushun	Fushun Electric Railway	
China	Fuzhou	Fuzhou Metro	
China	Guangzhou	Guangzhou Metro	Except Lines 4, 5, 6, 14 and 21, but overhead wires installed in depots.
China	Guiyang	Guiyang Metro	
China	Haining	Hangzhou-Haining Intercity Rail	
China	Hangzhou	Hangzhou Metro	
China	Harbin	Harbin Metro	
China	Hefei	Hefei Metro	
China	Hohhot	Hohhot Metro	
China	Jinan	Jinan Metro	
China	Lanzhou	Lanzhou Metro	
China	Nanchang	Nanchang Metro	
China	Nanjing	Nanjing Metro	
China	Nanning	Nanning Metro	
China	Ningbo	Ningbo Rail Transit	Line 4 uses third rail for returning current
China	Shanghai	Shanghai Metro	Except Lines 16 and 17, but overhead wires installed in the depot for line 16.
China	Shaoxing	Shaoxing Metro	
China	Shenyang	Shenyang Metro	
China	Shenzhen	Shenzhen Metro	Except Lines 3 and 6, but overhead wires installed in the depot for line 6.
China	Shijiazhuang	Shijiazhuang Metro	
China	Suzhou	Suzhou Metro	
China	Tianjin	Tianjin Metro	Lines 5, 6 and 9 only
China	Ürümqi	Ürümqi Metro	
China	Wuhan	Wuhan Metro	Line 6 only
China	Xi’an	Xi'an Metro	
China	Xiamen	Xiamen Metro	
China	Xuzhou	Xuzhou Metro	
China	Zhengzhou	Zhengzhou Metro	
Colombia	Medellín	Medellín Metro	Lines A and B
Peru	Lima	Lima Metro	
Czech Republic	Tábor – Bechyně	Správa železnic	Tábor – Bechyně line only (24 km, built in 1903)
Dominican Republic	Santo Domingo	Santo Domingo Metro	
Egypt	Cairo	Cairo Metro	Line 1
France	Société Nationale des Chemins de fer (SNCF)		25 kV AC used on new high speed lines (TGV) and in the north (see below)
Hong Kong	Hong Kong	Mass Transit Railway	Except East Rail line and Tuen Ma line which use 25 kV 50 Hz AC (see below) and the light rail which uses 750 V DC
Hungary	Budapest	Budapest Cog-wheel Railway	Converted from 550 V DC (city trams nominal voltage at that time) during the 1973 reconstruction.
Indonesia	Jakarta	KRL Commuter Line Jabodetabek; Jakarta MRT	
Indonesia	Yogyakarta-Solo	KRL Commuterline Yogyakarta–Solo	
Ireland	Dublin	Dublin Area Rapid Transit	
Israel	Tel Aviv	Tel Aviv Light Rail	Red Line runs partially as a premetro
Italy	Rome	Rome Metro	Line A, Line B, Line Roma-Ostia Lido
Japan	Japan Railways (JR) lines		Most electrified lines in Kantō, Chūbu, Kansai, Chūgoku, and Shikoku (except Shinkansen and Hokuriku region)
Japan	Most private railway lines		See Railway electrification in Japan for more details including exceptions
Japan	Most subway lines		See Railway electrification in Japan for more details including exceptions
South Korea	Seoul National Capital Area	Seoul Subway	Except Korail Subway Line (except Line 3) (see below)
South Korea	Busan	Busan Subway	
South Korea	Daegu	Daegu Subway	
South Korea	Daejeon	Daejeon Subway	
South Korea	Gwangju	Gwangju Subway	
South Korea	Incheon	Incheon Subway Line 1	
Mexico	Guadalajara	SITEUR	Line 3
Mexico	Mexico City	STC	Line 12
Mexico	Monterrey	Sistema de Transporte Colectivo Metrorrey	
Netherlands	Nederlandse Spoorwegen – Dutch Railways (NS)		25 kV AC used on high speed lines and freight line Betuweroute (see below); The existing 1500 V DC lines might be converted to 3 kV DC.
New Zealand	Wellington	Wellington suburban	Except Wairarapa Line beyond Upper Hutt. Since 2011, the nominal voltage was 1600 V but with the same tolerances as 1500 V (i.e. 1300–1800 V), making it backwards-compatible with 1500 V rolling stock. Since May 2016 the operating voltage was increased to 1700 V DC following the full introduction of the Matangi EMUs.
Philippines	Metro Manila	Manila MRT	Makati Intra-city Subway (Line 5) and Metro Manila Subway (Line 9) only. Line 7 uses 750 V DC third rail.
Philippines	Metro Manila; Rizal	Manila LRT	Line 2 only. Line 1 uses 750 V DC.
Philippines	Metro Manila; Central Luzon; Laguna	Philippine National Railways	North–South Commuter Railway
Portugal	Lisbon, Oeiras and Cascais	Linha de Cascais	To be converted to 25 kV AC.
Singapore		Mass Rapid Transit	North East Line, operated by SBS Transit
Slovakia	Tatra Mountains in the area of Poprad	Tatra Electric Railway	
Spain	Catalonia	Ferrocarrils de la Generalitat de Catalunya	
Spain	Madrid	ADIF	Only Cercedilla-Cotos line
Spain	Mallorca	Serveis Ferroviaris de Mallorca	
Spain	North coast (Asturias-Leon-Cantabria-Basque Country)	FEVE	
Spain	Basque Country	Euskotren Trena	
Spain	Valencian Community	Ferrocarrils de la Generalitat Valenciana	
Sweden	Stockholm	Roslagsbanan	
Switzerland	Aigle – Leysin, canton of Vaud	Chemin de fer Aigle–Leysin (AL)	
Switzerland	Aigle, Vaud – Champéry, canton of Valais	Chemin de fer Aigle–Ollon–Monthey–Champéry (AOMC)	
Switzerland	Aigle – Les Diablerets, canton of Vaud	Chemin de fer Aigle–Sépey–Diablerets (ASD)	
Switzerland	Interlaken – Lauterbrunnen / Grindelwald, canton of Bern	Berner Oberland Bahn (BOB)	
Switzerland	Canton of Jura	Chemins de fer du Jura (CJ)	Metre gauge lines only
Switzerland	Lausanne – Bercher, canton of Vaud	Chemin de fer Lausanne–Échallens–Bercher (LEB)	
Switzerland	Nyon – La Cure, canton of Vaud	Chemin de fer Nyon-St-Cergue-Morez (NStCNM)	Converted in the 1980s from 2200 V DC
Switzerland	Vitznau / Goldau – Rigi	Rigi Bahnen (VRB/ARB)	
Switzerland	Wilderswil – Schynige Platte, canton of Bern	Schynige Platte Bahn (SPB)	
Switzerland	Liestal – Waldenburg, canton of Basel-Country	Waldenburgerbahn (WB)	
Switzerland	Lauterbrunnen – Grindelwald, canton of Bern	Wengernalpbahn (WAB)	
Turkey	Bursa	Bursaray	
Turkey	Istanbul	Istanbul Metro	Line M3, M4, M7, M8, M9 and M11
United Kingdom	Newcastle, Sunderland, Gateshead and Tyneside	Tyne & Wear Metro	Light rail
United States	Chicago	Metra Electric District	
United States	California	Sacramento Northern Railway	operated 1936–c. 1960s
United States	Maryland	Purple Line	Light rail under construction
United States	Northern Indiana & Chicago	South Shore Line	
United States	Oregon	Southern Pacific Red Electric Lines	1914–1929
United States	Seattle	Link light rail	1 and 2 lines only

==== 3 kV DC ====
Country	Location	Name of system	Note
Belgium	Belgium National Railways (SNCB)		National standard. 25 kV AC used on high speed lines and some lines in the south (see below).
Brazil	Rio de Janeiro	SuperVia Trens Urbanos	
Brazil	São Paulo	São Paulo Metropolitan Trains	
Chile	Empresa de los Ferrocarriles del Estado		
Czech Republic	Správa železnic		Northern part of network only (approx. the Děčín – Praha – Ostrava route). The system change stations are Kadaň-Prunéřov, Beroun, Benešov u Prahy, Kutná Hora hl.n., Svitavy, Nezamyslice, Říkovice. The southern part uses 25 kV 50 Hz (see below). The 3 kV system is to be phased out in favour of 25 kV AC.
Estonia	Tallinn	Elron	Commuter rail only
Georgia	Georgian Railways		In fact 3,300 V
Italy	Rete Ferroviaria Italiana		25 kV AC used on new high speed lines (see below)
North Korea	Korean State Railway		National standard
Latvia	Latvian Railways		Commuter rail only.
Morocco	ONCF		National standard
Netherlands	ProRail		Planned
Poland	Polish Railway Lines		National standard. Planned high speed lines in Poland will use 25 kV AC
Poland	Warsaw and suburbs	Warszawska Kolej Dojazdowa	600 V DC until 27 May 2016
Russia	Russian Railways		New electrification use only 25 kV AC (see below), except Moscow Central Circle and other interconnection lines in Moscow, and 2 interconnection lines (Veymarn line and Kamennogorsk line) in St. Petersburg. Sverdlovsk railway and West Siberian railway to be converted to 25 kV AC.
Slovakia	Slovak Republic Railways (ŽSR)		Northern main line (connected to Czech Republic and Poland) and eastern lines (around Košice and Prešov), conversion to 25 kV AC planned, and the broad gauge line between Košice and the Ukraine border (it will remain 3 kV until new broad gauge line construction, then convert to 25 kV AC), planned new broad gauge line is supposed to use 25 kV AC. Currently, the part north and east of the station Púchov uses 3 kV DC, the rest uses 25 kV 50 Hz (see below).
Slovenia	Slovenian Railways		National standard
South Africa	Transnet Freight Rail; Metrorail		National standard; also 25 kV AC (see below) and 50 kV AC used
Spain	Administrador de Infraestructuras Ferroviarias		25 kV AC used on high speed lines (AVE) (see below)
Ukraine	Ukrainian Railways		In east (Donetsk industrial zone), in west (west from L'viv – connecting to Slovakia and Poland), to be converted to 25 kV AC (see below)

==== 15 kV AC, 16 2/3 Hz / 16.7 Hz ====
Country	Location	Name of system	Notes
Austria	ÖBB		National standard. Planned new high speed lines will near the border use 25 kV AC: Innsbruck-Italy and broad gauge to Ukraine. Austrian National Railways also operate in the small country of Liechtenstein, which also uses 15 kV AC.
Czech Republic	Znojmo - Retz	Správa železnic	Isolated section near border with Austria
Germany	Deutsche Bahn - German National Railways (DB)		National standard
Norway	Norwegian National Rail Administration		National standard
Sweden	Swedish Transport Administration		National standard
Switzerland	Canton of Bern	BLS	
Switzerland	Central Switzerland and Bernese Highlands	Zentralbahn	
Switzerland	Canton of Vaud	Chemin de fer Bière-Apples-Morges (BAM)	
Switzerland	Canton of Zürich	Sihltal Zürich Uetliberg Bahn	
Switzerland	Swiss Federal Railways (SBB CFF FFS)		

==== 25 kV AC, 50 Hz ====
Country	Location	Name of system	Notes
Argentina	Buenos Aires	Roca Line	Constitución – Ezeiza; Constitución – Alejandro Korn; Constitución – Bosques; Constitución – La Plata
Australia	Brisbane, North Coast line, Blackwater and Goonyella coal railways	Queensland Rail	
Australia	Perth	Transperth	
Australia	Adelaide	Adelaide Metro	Seaford/Flinders and Gawler lines electrified
Australia	Sydney	Sydney Metro	Completely new lines (Western Sydney Airport and Sydney Metro West) converted lines use 1500 V DC
Belarus			National standard
Belgium	Belgium National Railways (NMBS/SNCB)		High-speed lines and some other lines. The rest of the network is 3 kV DC (see above)
Bosnia and Herzegovina			
Botswana			Proposed line to Namibia
Bulgaria	Bulgarian State Railways		
China	China Railway		National standard
China	Beijing	Beijing Subway	Daxing Airport Line only
China	Chengdu	Chengdu Metro	Lines 17, 18 and 19 only
China	Wenzhou	Wenzhou Rail Transit	
Croatia	Croatian Railways		Lines Zagreb-Rijeka and Rijeka-Šapjane formerly used 3kv DC traction
Czech Republic	Správa železnic		Southern lines only (linking Karlovy Vary – Cheb – Plzeň – České Budějovice – Tábor – Jihlava – Brno – Břeclav – Slovakia), northern lines use 3 kV DC (see above)
Denmark		Banedanmark	National standard, excluding Copenhagen S-train
Djibouti	Addis Ababa–Djibouti Railway	Ethiopian Railway Corporation	
Ethiopia	Addis Ababa–Djibouti Railway	Ethiopian Railway Corporation	
Finland			National standard
France	North and new lines	SNCF	A number of lines also electrified with 1.5 kV (see above)
Germany	Harz	Rübelandbahn	
Greece	Hellenic Railways Organisation		National standard
Hong Kong	Kowloon, New Territories	MTR	East Rail and Tuen Ma lines
Hungary	Hungarian State Railways and Raaberbahn		
India	Indian Railways		Entire IR network uses the current system since 2016.
India	Mumbai	Mumbai Suburban Railway	Conversion from 1.5 kV DC to the current system was completed in 2012 (for Western line) and 2016 (for Central line) respectively
India	Mumbai	Mumbai Metro	
India	Chennai (Madras)	Chennai Metro	
India	Delhi	Delhi Metro	
India	Hyderabad	Hyderabad Metro	
India	Pune	Pune Metro	
India	Nagpur	Nagpur Metro	
India	Jaipur	Jaipur Metro	
India	Lucknow	Lucknow Metro	
Indonesia	Jakarta-Bandung	Whoosh High-speed Rail	
Iran			Planned
Israel	Israel Railways		Construction contract awarded in December 2015. Initial test runs began December 2017.
Italy	Rete Ferroviaria Italiana (Italian Railways Network)		New high-speed lines only, other lines use 3 kV DC (see above)
Japan	Kantō (northeast of Tokyo), Tōhoku, and Hokkaido regions	JR East Tohoku Shinkansen, Joetsu Shinkansen, and Hokuriku Shinkansen (sections between Tokyo – Karuizawa, and between Jōetsumyōkō – Itoigawa); JR Hokkaido Hokkaido Shinkansen	25 kV AC 60 Hz in some areas (see below).
Kazakhstan			
Laos	Boten–Vientiane railway		
Latvia	Latvian Railways		Eastern lines only (planned)
Lithuania	Kena — Kaunas and Lentvaris — Trakai	Lithuanian Railways (LG)	Electrification of Naujoji Vilnia – Kena — Gudogai (BCh) route for Vilnius – Minsk (Belarus) services is established on 2017. Further Kaunas – Klaipeda and Kaunas – Kybartai corridors electrification will follow projects.
Luxembourg	Chemins de fer luxembourgeois (CFL)		National standard
Malaysia	Padang Besar – KL Sentral – Johor Bahru	KTM ETS (run through West Coast railway line), Keretapi Tanah Melayu Berhad	
Malaysia	Bukit Mertajam – Padang Regas and Butterworth – Padang Besar	KTM Komuter Northern Sector, Keretapi Tanah Melayu Berhad	
Malaysia	Batu Caves – Pulau Sebang/Tampin, Tanjung Malim – Port Klang and KL Sentral – Terminal Skypark	KTM Komuter Central Sector (Seremban Line, Port Klang Line and Skypark Link), Keretapi Tanah Melayu Berhad	
Malaysia	KL Sentral – KLIA2	Express Rail Link (KLIA Ekspres and KLIA Transit)	
Montenegro	Belgrade–Bar railway and Nikšić–Podgorica railway	Railways of Montenegro	
Morocco	Kenitra–Tangier high-speed rail line	ONCF	Casablanca–Kenitra conventional line onto which high-speed trains continue remains at 3 kV DC
Namibia			Proposed line to Botswana
Netherlands	HSL-Zuid high speed line and Betuweroute freight line	Nederlandse Spoorwegen	1.5 kV DC used on the rest of the network (see above)
New Zealand	Auckland	Auckland suburban	77 km between Swanson and Papakura; first service 28 April 2014
New Zealand	Central North Island	North Island Main Trunk	411 km between Palmerston North and Hamilton
North Macedonia	Makedonski Železnici		
Poland	Hrubieszów	Broad Gauge Metallurgy Line (LHS)	A section from the border to Hrubieszów will be electrified in conjunction with the electrification of the connecting border – Izov – Kovel line in Ukraine. The reminder sections will follow.
Portugal	Portuguese Railways (CP)		Except the Linha de Cascais (1500 V DC)
Romania	Caile Ferate Romane		
Russia	Russian Railways		National standard used for new electrification; some areas still use 3 kV DC (see above)
Serbia	Serbian Railways		
Slovakia	Slovak Republic Railways (ŽSR)		South-western lines only (around Bratislava, Kuty, Trencin, Trnava, Nove Zamky, Zvolen) and the rest of the network (except narrow gauge lines), currently 3 kV DC, to follow (see above)
South Africa	Transnet Freight Rail, Gautrain		Also 3 kV DC (see above) and 50 kV 50 Hz used.
Spain	ADIF Alta Velocidad		High-speed lines only, other lines use 3 kV DC (see above)
Sweden	Malmö	Öresund Line	On the Öresund Bridge and short part of land.
Sweden	Haparanda	Tornio–Haparanda railway	Connection with the Finnish railway network.
Thailand	Bangkok	Suvarnabhumi Airport Link and SRT Red Lines	
Tunisia			
Turkey	Turkish State Railways (TCDD)		National standard
United Kingdom	Network Rail		Except Southern region and Merseyrail and Northern Ireland
Ukraine	Ukrainian Railways		National standard, in most of the west; also 3 kV DC in the east (see above)
Uzbekistan			
Zimbabwe	Gweru – Harare	National Railways of Zimbabwe (NRZ)	De-energised in 2008. May be renewed in the future.

==== 25 kV AC, 60 Hz ====
Country	Location	Name of system	Notes
Japan	Kantō (west of Tokyo), Chūbu, Kansai, Chūgoku, and Kyushu regions	Tōkaidō-Sanyō Shinkansen; Hokuriku Shinkansen (sections between Karuizawa – Jōetsumyōkō, and between Itoigawa – Tsuruga); Kyushu Shinkansen; Nishi Kyushu Shinkansen	25 kV AC 50 Hz in eastern Japan (see above)
South Korea	Korail		All Korail freight/passenger lines except Seoul subway Line 3 which is 1.5 kV DC (see above)
South Korea	Seoul	Shinbundang line	
South Korea	Incheon, Seoul	A'REX	
Mexico	Greater Mexico City	Ferrocarril Suburbano de la Zona Metropolitana del Valle de México	
Mexico	Mexico Valley, Toluca Valley	El Insurgente	First section operating on 2023. Rest expected mid of 2024
Mexico	Yucatán Peninsula	Tren Maya	Under construction. About 40% of the route to be electrified
Saudi Arabia	Hejaz region	Haramain High-Speed Railway	
Republic of China (Taiwan)	Taiwan Railways Administration		National standard
Republic of China (Taiwan)	Western Taiwan	Taiwan High Speed Rail	
United States	New Jersey	Morris & Essex Lines, New Jersey Transit	Converted from 3,000 V DC to 25 kV 60 Hz in 1984.
United States	Aberdeen-Matawan to Long Branch, New Jersey	North Jersey Coast Line, New Jersey Transit	Converted in 1978 from Pennsylvania Railroad 11 kV 25 Hz system to the 12.5 kV 25 Hz on the Rahway-Matawan ROW and 12.5 kV 60 Hz electrification extended to Long Branch in 1988. The Matawan-Long Branch voltage converted from 12.5 kV 60 Hz system to the 25 kV 60 Hz in 2002.
United States	New Haven to Boston	Northeast Corridor (NEC), Amtrak	Electrified in 2000; see Amtrak's 60 Hz traction power system
United States	Denver	Denver RTD	Opened in 2016; separate 750 V DC system for light rail
United States	Rancho Cucamonga to Las Vegas	Brightline West	Under construction, expected to be operational by 2027–28.
United States	California	California High-Speed Rail	Under construction between Merced and Bakersfield, set to begin operation in 2029–30.
United States	San Francisco Peninsula	Caltrain	Completed in 2024; see Caltrain Modernization Program
United States	New Mexico	Navajo Mine Railroad	
United States	Texas	Monticello & Martin Lake lines, Texas Utilities	De-electrified around 2011

=== Conductor rail systems ===
==== 600 V DC conductor ====
All systems are third rail unless stated otherwise. Used by some older metros.

Country	Location	Name of system	Notes
Argentina	Buenos Aires	Urquiza Line	Federico Lacroze-General Lemos
Canada	Toronto	Toronto subway	Only on subway lines
Greece	Athens	EIS/ISAP	used between 1904 and 1985
Italy	Turin	Superga Rack Railway	
Japan	Tokyo	Tokyo Metro Ginza Line and Marunouchi Line	
Japan	Nagoya, Aichi	Nagoya Municipal Subway Higashiyama Line and Meijō Line	
Sweden	Stockholm	Stockholm Metro	650 V, Green and Red Lines
United Kingdom	Glasgow	Glasgow Subway	
United States	Anaheim, California	Disneyland Monorail	
United States	Boston	Massachusetts Bay Transportation Authority	Red and Orange Lines, the subway part of the Blue Line southwest of Airport station
United States	Chicago	Chicago "L"	elevated and subway lines
United States	Staten Island	Staten Island Railway	
United States	New York City metro area	PATH	
United States	Philadelphia	SEPTA Metro	B, L, and M
United States	Bay Lake, Florida	Walt Disney World Monorail System	
United States	California	Sacramento Northern Railway	Used 1906–c. 1960s. The Northern subdivision was built by the Northern Electric Railway and operated with overhead wires in towns.

==== 750 V DC conductor ====
Conductor rail systems have been separated into tables based on whether they are top, side or bottom contact. Used by most metros outside Asia and the former Eastern bloc.

===== Bottom contact =====
Country	Location	Name of system	Notes
Algeria	Algiers	Algiers Metro	
Austria	Vienna	Vienna U-Bahn	
Brazil	São Paulo	São Paulo Metro	Except Lines 4 and 5
China	Beijing	Beijing Subway	Capital Airport Line only
China	Kunming	Kunming Metro	Except Line 4
China	Tianjin	Tianjin Metro	Lines 2 and 3 only
China	Wuhan	Wuhan Metro	Lines 1, 2, 3 and 4 only
Czech Republic	Prague	Prague Metro	
Denmark	Copenhagen	Copenhagen Metro	
Egypt	Cairo	Cairo Metro	Line 2 and Line 3
Finland	Helsinki	Helsinki Metro	
Germany	Berlin	Berlin U-Bahn and Berlin S-Bahn	Lines from U5 to U9 (large profile). Negative polarity.
Germany	Hamburg	Hamburg U-Bahn	
Germany	Munich	Munich U-Bahn	
Germany	Nuremberg	Nuremberg U-Bahn	
India	Bangalore	Namma Metro	
India	Kochi	Kochi Metro	
India	Ahmedabad	Ahmedabad Metro	
India	Agra	Agra Metro	
India	Kanpur	Kanpur Metro	
India	Gurgaon	Rapid Metro Gurgaon	
India	Kolkata	Kolkata Metro	Except Blue Line
India	Pune	Pune Metro Line 3	Only Line 3
South Korea	Busan	Busan-Gimhae Light Rail Transit	
Malaysia	Klang Valley	Klang Valley Integrated Transit System LRT Ampang and Sri Petaling lines, MRT Kajang and Putrajaya lines, and KL Monorail	to be used on LRT Shah Alam Line
Netherlands	Amsterdam	Amsterdam Metro	including line 51 north of Station Zuid
Netherlands	Rotterdam	Rotterdam Metro	North of Capelsebrug station overhead wires
Norway	Oslo	Oslo T-bane	
Poland	Warsaw	Warsaw Metro	
Romania	Bucharest	Bucharest Metro	
Singapore	Singapore	Mass Rapid Transit	North–South, East–West, Circle and Thomson-East Coast lines operated by SMRT Trains; Downtown line operated by SBS Transit
Republic of China (Taiwan)	Kaohsiung	Kaohsiung Metro	
Republic of China (Taiwan)	Taipei	Taipei Metro	
Republic of China (Taiwan)	Taoyuan–Taipei	Taoyuan Metro	
Turkey	Ankara	Ankara Metro	
Turkey	Istanbul	Istanbul Metro	Lines M2 and M6 only
Turkey	İzmir	İzmir Metro	
United Kingdom	London	Docklands Light Railway	
United States	New York City	Metro-North Railroad	

===== Side contact =====
Country	Location	Name of system	Notes
Canada	Montreal	Montreal Metro	(guide bars, see DC, four-rail below)
China	Shanghai	Shanghai Metro – Pujiang line	Central guide rail for rubber-tyred Bombardier Innovia APM 300
Chile	Santiago	Santiago Metro	
France	Paris	Paris Métro (Rubber tired)	Positive (and sometimes negative) polarity on guide bars. See DC, four-rail below.
France	Lyon	Lyon Métro	Positive (and sometimes negative) polarity on guide bars. See DC, four-rail below.
France	Marseille	Marseille Métro	Positive (and sometimes negative) polarity on guide bars. See DC, four-rail below.
France	Lille	Lille Métro	Positive (and sometimes negative) polarity on guide bars. See DC, four-rail below.
France	Rennes	Rennes Métro	Positive (and sometimes negative) polarity on guide bars. See DC, four-rail below.
France	Toulouse	Toulouse Métro	Positive (and sometimes negative) polarity on guide bars. See DC, four-rail below.
Hong Kong	Hong Kong	Hong Kong International Airport; Automated People Mover (APM)	Mitsubishi "Crystal Mover" system using two power rails (positive and negative) with side collection.
Indonesia	Palembang	Palembang Light Rail Transit	Palembang Light Rail Transit and Greater Jakarta Light Rail Transit are operated by Kereta Api Indonesia. Jakarta Light Rail Transit is operated by Jakarta Propertindo (Jakpro).
Indonesia	Jakarta	Jakarta Light Rail Transit	Palembang Light Rail Transit and Greater Jakarta Light Rail Transit are operated by Kereta Api Indonesia. Jakarta Light Rail Transit is operated by Jakarta Propertindo (Jakpro).
Indonesia	Jakarta	Greater Jakarta Light Rail Transit	Palembang Light Rail Transit and Greater Jakarta Light Rail Transit are operated by Kereta Api Indonesia. Jakarta Light Rail Transit is operated by Jakarta Propertindo (Jakpro).
Japan	Sapporo, Hokkaido	Sapporo Municipal Subway Namboku Line	
Singapore	Singapore	Light Rail Transit	Sengkang and Punggol lines operated by SBS Transit
Singapore	Singapore	Sentosa Express	Sentosa Express operated by SDC
Malaysia	Klang Valley	Klang Valley Integrated Transit System LRT Kelana Jaya line	Innovia Metro system using two power rails (positive and negative) with side collection.
United States	Las Vegas	Las Vegas Monorail	

===== Top contact =====
Country	Location	Name of system	Notes
Canada	Vancouver	Vancouver SkyTrain	Canada Line only
China	Beijing	Beijing Subway	Capital Airport Line use bottom contact
China	Tianjin	Tianjin Metro	Line 1 only
France	Paris	Paris Métro (Conventional metro)	
Germany	Berlin	Berlin U-Bahn	Lines from U1 to U4 (small profile)
Greece	Athens	Athens Metro	Line 1 was 600 V before 1985.
Hungary	Budapest	Budapest Metro	Except line M1, which is 600 V DC with overhead lines.
India	Kolkata	Kolkata Metro	Only Blue Line
Japan	Osaka, Osaka	Osaka Metro	Except the Sakaisuji Line, Nagahori Tsurumi-ryokuchi Line, and the Imazatosuji Line, which are 1,500 V DC with overhead lines.
Japan	Suita, Osaka; Toyonaka, Osaka	Kita-Osaka Kyuko Railway	
Japan	Higashiosaka, Osaka; Ikoma, Nara; Nara, Nara	Kintetsu Keihanna Line	
Japan	Yokohama, Kanagawa	Yokohama Municipal Subway	Blue Line (Line 1 and Line 3) only
North Korea	Pyongyang	Pyongyang Metro	based on fleet of cars from Beijing and Germany
South Korea	Yongin	Everline	
Portugal	Lisbon	Lisbon Metro	
Sweden	Stockholm	Stockholm Metro	Nominal voltage 650 V, subway 3 (blue line) 750 V. Subway 1 and 2 will change in the long term to 750 V.
United Kingdom	Liverpool	Merseyrail	
United Kingdom	London	Northern City Line	access to City (Moorgate)
United Kingdom	London	Suburban electrification of the LNWR Suburban Network	formerly four-rail out of Euston and Broad Street, curtailed, upgraded and standardised
United Kingdom	Southern England	Southern Region of British Railways and successors	660 V system upgraded and expanded
United Kingdom	London	Waterloo and City line	Upgraded by British Rail to 750 V prior to sale to London Underground
United States	Atlanta	MARTA	
United States	Los Angeles	Los Angeles Metro Rail	B and D Lines
United States	Miami	Metrorail	
United States	New York City and Long Island; East River Tunnels shared with Amtrak	Long Island Rail Road	Central, Greenport, and Oyster Bay branches not electrified; Montauk Branch not electrified east of Babylon; Port Jefferson Branch not electrified east of Huntington
United States	Philadelphia	PATCO Speedline	
United States	Puerto Rico	Tren Urbano	
United States	Washington, D.C.	Washington Metro	
United States	within the Hudson and East River Tunnels as well as under Manhattan; Northeast Corridor	Amtrak	
United States	within the Hudson Tunnel into Manhattan	New Jersey Transit	
United States	Honolulu	Skyline (HART)	

===== Mixed =====
Country	Location	Name of system	Notes
China	Tianjin	Tianjin Metro	Top contact in Line 1, bottom contact in Lines 2 and 3

==== 1,500 V DC conductor ====
All systems are third rail unless stated otherwise.

Type	Country	Location	Name of system	Notes
Bottom contact	France	Paris	Paris Métro Line 18	Currently under construction
Bottom contact	France	Toulouse	Line C (Toulouse Metro)	Currently under construction
Side contact	France	Chambéry – Modane	Culoz–Modane railway	used between 1925 and 1976, today overhead wire
Bottom contact	China	Beijing	Beijing Subway	Line 7 only
Bottom contact	China	Guangzhou	Guangzhou Metro	Lines 4, 5, 6, 14 and 21 only. Overhead wires in depots; all trains are equipped with pantographs
Bottom contact	China	Kunming	Kunming Metro	Line 4 only
Bottom contact	China	Qingdao	Qingdao Metro	
Bottom contact	China	Shanghai	Shanghai Metro	Lines 16 and 17 only. Overhead wires in depot of Line 16, all trains on Line 16 have pantographs for depot use.
Bottom contact	China	Shenzhen	Shenzhen Metro	Lines 3 and 6 only. Overhead wires in depot of Line 6, all trains on Line 6 have pantographs for depot use.
Bottom contact	China	Wuhan	Wuhan Metro	Lines 7, 8, 11 and Yangluo Line only
Bottom contact	China	Wuxi	Wuxi Metro	

== Systems using non-standard voltages ==
=== Overhead systems ===
==== DC voltage ====
Voltage	Country	Location	Name of system	Notes
120	United Kingdom	Seaton, Devon	Seaton Tramway	Half scale trams. Operated 1969-now. Substations have battery banks for back up.
250	United States	Chicago	Chicago Tunnel Company	operated 1906–1959
370	United States	Connecticut	Norwich and Westerly Railway	operated 1906–1922
550	Hong Kong	Hong Kong Island	Hong Kong Tramways	
550	Isle of Man	Isle of Man	Manx Electric Railway	
550	Isle of Man	Isle of Man	Snaefell Mountain Railway	The third rail is for the Fell Brake and doesn't carry any power
550	India	Kolkata	Trams in Kolkata	
550	United States	Bakersfield, California	Bakersfield and Kern Electric Railway	operated 1888–1942
550	United States	Fresno, California	Fresno Traction Company	operated 1903–1939
550	United States	Monterey, California	Monterey and Pacific Grove Railway	operated 1905–1923
550	United States	Phoenix, Arizona	Phoenix Street Railway	operated 1888–1948
550	United States	Reno, Nevada	Reno Traction Company	operated 1904–1927, see Streetcars in Reno
560	Switzerland	Lauterbrunnen	Bergbahn Lauterbrunnen-Mürren	
575	United States	Birmingham, Alabama	Birmingham Railway, Light and Power Company	
650	United States	Buffalo, New York	Buffalo Metro Rail	
650	United States	El Paso, Texas	El Paso Streetcar	
650	United States	Pittsburgh	Pittsburgh Light Rail	
650	Switzerland	Basel	Basel Trams (BVB/BLT)	
660	Poland	Metropolis GZM	Silesian Interurbans	
700	Switzerland	Bex – Col de Bretaye, Vaud	Chemin de fer Bex-Villars-Bretaye	
730	United States	Pennsylvania	Philadelphia Suburban Transportation Company	purchased by Philadelphia and Western Railroad in 1953 and converted to 600 VDC
800	Poland	Tricity	Szybka Kolej Miejska (Tricity)	Operated 1951–1976. Converted to 3,000 V DC in 1976.
800	Austria	Styria	Lokalbahn Mixnitz–Sankt Erhard	
825	United States	Portland, Oregon	MAX, TriMet	Light rail sections west of NE 9th Avenue & Holladay Street utilize a 750 V system
850	Austria	Lower Austria	Badner Bahn (Inzersdorf–Baden only)	
850	Switzerland	Capolago – Monte Generoso, Ticino	Ferrovia Monte Generoso (MG)	
900	Switzerland	Fribourg	Palézieux–Bulle–Montbovon railway line (TPF)	
900	Switzerland	Vaud	Montreux–Lenk im Simmental line	
900	Switzerland	Vaud	Vevey–Les Pléiades	
900	Austria	Innsbruck	Trams in Innsbruck	
1,000	Italy; Switzerland	St Moritz, canton of Graubünden – Tirano, Lombardy	Rhätische Bahn (RhB)	Bernina line only; remainder of system electrified at 11 kV AC, 16 2/3 Hz. The Bernina line is an international line linking Switzerland (St. Moritz) with Italy (Tirano)
1,000	Switzerland	Canton of Vaud	Montreux–Glion–Rochers-de-Naye railway line (MVR)	
1,000	Hungary	Budapest	Budapest Commuter Rail and Rapid Transit (BHÉV)	
1,000	Austria	Salzburg state	Bürmoos–Ostermiething and Salzburg–Lamprechtshausen	
1,100	Argentina	Buenos Aires	Buenos Aires Metro (Subterráneos de Buenos Aires)	Only Line A (converted to 1,500 V DC with La Brugeoise trains replaced by new rolling stock in 2013)
1,250	Switzerland	Canton of Bern	Regionalverkehr Bern-Solothurn (RBS)	All lines except tram line 6 between Bern and Worb, which is electrified at 600 V DC
1,350	Italy; Switzerland	Domodossola, Piedmont – Locarno, canton of Ticino	Domodossola–Locarno railway line (FART / SSIF)	International railway between Italy (Domodossola) and Switzerland (Locarno)
1,650	Denmark	Copenhagen	Copenhagen S-train	Suburban rail network in Copenhagen
1,650	Italy	Rome	Rome–Giardinetti railway	Isolated Italian metre gauge line.
1,800	Austria	Styria	Feldbach-Bad Gleichenberg	
2,400	Germany	Lausitzer		work line of the Lausitzer Braunkohle coal company
2,400	Poland	Konin	Konin Coal Mine	
2,400	Poland	Turek	PAK KWB ADAMÓW	mine closed in February 2021, the railway will be dismantled
2,400	France	Grenoble	Chemin de fer de La Mure	−1,200 V, +1,200 V two wire system from 1903 to 1950. 2,400 V since 1950.
2,400	Switzerland	Grisons	Chur–Arosa railway line	Until 1997. 11 kV 16.7 Hz since then.
2,400	United States	Montana	Butte, Anaconda and Pacific Railway	electrified 1913–1967, dismantled in favor of diesel power
3,500	United Kingdom	Manchester	Bury – Holcombe Brook	operated 1913–1918
4,000	Italy	Piedmont	Turin–Ceres railway	1920–1984. 3,000 V DC since 1984.
6,000	Russia			experiments in the late 1970s (3,000 V DC lines)

==== AC voltage ====
Voltage	Frequency	Country	Location	Name of system	Notes
3,000	50 Hz	Austria	Stubaital	Stubaitalbahn	Until 1983. 900 V DC since then.
3,300	15 Hz	United States	Tulare County, California	Visalia Electric Railroad	1904–1992
3,300	25 Hz	United States	Napa and Solano Counties, California	San Francisco, Napa and Calistoga Railway	1905–1937
3,300	25 Hz	United States	Indiana	Indianapolis and Cincinnati Traction Company	1905–1924
5,500	16 2/3 Hz	Germany	Murnau	Ammergau Railway	1905–1955, after 1955 15 kV, 16.7 Hz
6,000	25 Hz	Italy	Val Brembana, Lombardy	Val Brembana Railway	1906–1966
6,250	50 Hz	United Kingdom	London, Essex, Herts	Great Eastern suburban lines	Great Eastern suburban lines from Liverpool Street London, 1950s–c. 1980 (converted to 25 kV)
6,250	50 Hz	United Kingdom	Glasgow	Glasgow suburban lines	Sections of the North Clyde Line and Cathcart Circle Line from 1960–1970s
6,300	25 Hz	Germany	Hamburg	Hamburg S-Bahn	Operated with AC 1907–1955. Used both AC and DC (1,200 V 3rd rail) 1940–1955.
6,500	25 Hz	Austria	Sankt Pölten	Mariazellerbahn	
6,600	25 Hz	Norway	Orkland	Thamshavnbanen	
6,600	25 Hz	United Kingdom	Lancaster to Heysham	Morecambe branch line	1908–1951; Converted for testing of 50 Hz electrification in 1952
6,600	50 Hz	United Kingdom	Lancaster to Heysham	Morecambe branch line	1952–1966
6,600	50 Hz	Germany	Cologne Lowland	Hambachbahn and Nord-Süd-Bahn	transports lignite from open-pit mines to powerplants. Owned by RWE.
6,600		United States	Northern Indiana	Chicago, Lake Shore and South Bend Railway	1908–1925; Converted to 1,500 V DC
6,700	25 Hz	United Kingdom	London Victoria to London Bridge	South London line	1909–1928; Converted to 660 V (later 750 V) DC third-rail supply
8 kV	25 Hz	Germany	Karlsruhe	Alb Valley Railway	1911–1966, today using 750 V DC
8,000	15 Hz	Switzerland	Valais	Martigny–Orsières Railway	1910–1949. Then 15 kV 16.7 Hz AC
8,800	25 Hz	Germany	District of Karlsruhe, Baden-Württemberg	Alb Valley Railway	1911–1966. Initially 8,000 V. Since 1966 750 V DC
10 kV	25 Hz	Netherlands	The Hague – Rotterdam	Hofpleinlijn	from 1908, in 1926 converted to 1,500 DC, In 2006 replaced by 750 V DC light rail
10 kV	50 Hz	Russia	industrial railways at quarries	Russian Railways	operated from 1950s at coal and ore quarries
10 kV	50 Hz	Ukraine	industrial railways at quarries	Ukrainian Railways	operated from 1950s at coal and ore quarries
10 kV	50 Hz	Kazakhstan	industrial railways at quarries	some private industrial railways in Kazakhstan	operated from 1950s at coal and ore quarries
11 kV	16 2/3 Hz	Switzerland	Graubünden	Rhätische Bahn (RhB)	Except the Bernina line, which is electrified at 1,000 V DC
11 kV	16 2/3 Hz	Switzerland		Matterhorn-Gotthard-Bahn (MGB)	formerly Furka Oberalp Bahn (FO) and BVZ Zermatt-Bahn
11 kV	25 Hz	Italy	Campania	Alifana railway	Since 1913. After the World War II the line was dieselized
11 kV	50 Hz	France	Saint-Gervais-les-Bains	Mont Blanc Tramway	
11 kV	50 Hz	France	Haute-Savoie	Chemin de fer du Montenvers	
11 kV	25 Hz	Italy	Umbria	Terni–Perugia–Sansepolcro railway	1920–1956. Then 3 kV DC
11 kV	25 Hz	United States		Pennsylvania Railroad	All lines now 12 kV 25 Hz, 12.5 kV 60 Hz, or 25 kV 60 Hz; See Railroad electrification in the United States
11 kV	25 Hz	United States	Washington	Cascade Tunnel	Converted from three-phase 6600 V 25 Hz in 1927, dismantled 1956
11 kV	25 Hz	United States	Colorado	Denver and Intermountain Railroad	dismantled c. 1953
12 kV	16 2/3 Hz	France	lines in Pyrenees	Chemin de fer du Midi	most converted to 1,500 V 1922–23; Villefranche-Perpignan diesel 1971, then 1,500 V 1984
12 kV	25 Hz	United States	Washington, DC – New York City	Northeast Corridor (NEC), Amtrak	11 kV until 1978
12 kV	25 Hz	United States	Harrisburg, Pennsylvania to Philadelphia	Keystone Corridor, Amtrak	11 kV until 1978
12 kV	25 Hz	United States	Philadelphia	SEPTA	Regional Rail system only; 11 kV until 1978
12 kV	25 Hz	United States	Rahway to Aberdeen-Matawan, New Jersey	North Jersey Coast Line, New Jersey Transit	1978–2002 (11 kV until 1978). Converted to 25 kV 60 Hz
12.5 kV	60 Hz	United States	Pelham, NY-New Haven, CT	New Haven Line, Metro-North Railroad, Amtrak	11 kV until 1985
16 kV	50 Hz	Hungary	Budapest–Hegyeshalom railway	Budapest to Hegyeshalom	Kandó system 1931–1972, converted to 25 kV 50 Hz
20 kV	50 Hz	Germany	Freiburg	Höllentalbahn	Operated 1933–1960. Converted to 15 kV 16 2/3 Hz.
20 kV	50 Hz	France	Aix-les-Bains – La Roche-sur-Foron	Société Nationale des Chemins de fer (SNCF)	Operated 1950–1953. Converted to 25 kV 50 Hz.
20 kV	50 Hz	Japan	most electrified JR/the third sector lines in Hokkaidō and Tōhoku	JR East, JR Hokkaidō, and others	
20 kV	60 Hz	Japan	most electrified JR/the third sector lines in Kyūshū and Hokuriku region	JR Kyūshū and others	
50 kV	50 Hz	South Africa	Northern Cape, Western Cape	Sishen–Saldanha railway line	Opened in 1976 and hauls iron ore
50 kV	60 Hz	Canada	British Columbia	Tumbler Ridge Subdivision of BC Rail (Now Canadian National Railway)	Opened in 1983 to serve a coal mine in the northern Rocky Mountains. No longer in use.
50 kV	60 Hz	United States	Arizona	Black Mesa and Lake Powell Railroad	First line to use 50 kV electrification when it opened in 1973. This was an isolated coal-hauling short line; no longer in use.
50 kV	60 Hz	United States	Utah	Deseret Power Railroad	Formerly Deseret Western Railway. This is an isolated coal-hauling short line.

==== Three-phase AC voltage ====
===== Two wires =====
Voltage	Frequency & phases	Country	Location	Name of system	Notes
725	50 Hz, 3φ	Switzerland	Zermatt – Gornergrat, canton of Valais	Gornergratbahn	
750	40 Hz, 3φ	Switzerland	Burgdorf – Thun	Burgdorf-Thun Bahn	Operated 1899–1933; Converted to 15 kV 16 2/3 Hz in 1933
900	60 Hz, 3φ	Brazil	Rio de Janeiro	Corcovado Rack Railway	
1125	50 Hz, 3φ	Switzerland	Interlaken	Jungfraubahn	
3600	15 Hz, 3φ	Italy	Northern Italy	Valtellina Electrification	1902–1917
3600	50 Hz, 3φ	France	Saint-Jean-de-Luz to Larrun	Chemin de Fer de la Rhune	
3600	16 Hz, 3φ	Italy; Switzerland	Simplon Tunnel		1906–1930
3600	16 2/3 Hz, 3φ	Italy			Operated 1912–1976 in Upper Italy (more info needed)
3600	16 2/3 Hz, 3φ	Italy	Porrettana railway	FS	1927–1935
3600	16 2/3 Hz, 3φ	Italy	Trento/Trient – Brenner	Brenner Railway	1929–1965
5200	25 Hz, 3φ	Spain	Gérgal – Santa Fe	C.de H. Sur de España	1911–1966
6600	25 Hz, 3φ	United States	Cascade Tunnel, Washington state	Great Northern Railway	1909–1929
10 kV	45 Hz, 3φ	Italy	Roma – Sulmona	FS	1929–1944

===== Three wires =====
Voltage	Frequency	Country	Location	Name of system	Notes
3 kV	50 Hz	Germany	Kierberg	Zahnradbahn Tagebau Gruhlwerk	Rack railway (0.7 km); Operated 1927–1949
10 kV	50 Hz	Germany	Berlin-Lichterfelde (de)		Test track (1.8 km); Variable voltage and frequency Trial runs 1898–1901
14 kV (See notes)	38 Hz – 48 Hz (See notes)	Germany	Zossen – Marienfelde		Test track (23.4 km); Trial runs 1901–1904; Variable voltage between 10 and 14 kV; Frequency between 38 and 48 Hz
	50 Hz	Russia	Ship elevator of Krasnoyarsk Reservoir		Length 1.5 km, gauge 9000 mm

=== Conductor rail systems (DC voltage) ===
Conductor rail systems have been separated into tables based on whether they are top, side or bottom contact.

==== Top contact systems ====
Voltage	Type	Country	Location	Name of system	Notes
50	See notes	United Kingdom	Brighton	Volk's Electric Railway	Volk's Railway prior to 1884 (current fed through running rails)
110	third rail	United Kingdom	Brighton	Volk's Electric Railway	Claims to be the world's oldest operational electric railway
160	third rail	United Kingdom	Brighton	Volk's Electric Railway	Volk's Railway between 1884 and 1980s
100	fourth rail	United Kingdom	Beaulieu	Beaulieu Monorail (National Motor Museum – Beaulieu Palace House)	current fed by 2 contact wires
180	See notes	Germany	Berlin-Lichterfelde	Siemens streetcar	Current fed through the running rails Operated 1881–1891
200	third rail	United Kingdom	Southend	Southend Pier Railway	Until 1902
250	third rail	United Kingdom	Hythe, Hampshire	Hythe Pier Railway	
250	third rail	United States	Chicago, Illinois	Chicago Tunnel Company	Morgan Rack; 1904, revenue service 1906–1908
300	third rail	Georgia	New Athos	New Athos Cave Railway	
400	third rail	Germany	Berchtesgaden	Berchtesgaden Salt Mine Railway	
440	third rail	United Kingdom	London	Post Office Railway	Disused by post office since 2003 Now small section near Mount Pleasant operated as tourist attraction with battery powered stock 150 V was used in station areas to limit train speed
550	third rail	Argentina	Buenos Aires	Buenos Aires Metro (Subterráneos de Buenos Aires)	Only Line B
625	third rail	United States	New York City	New York City Subway	
630	fourth rail	United Kingdom	London	London Underground	Supplied at +420 V and −210 V (630 V total).
750	See notes	United Kingdom	London	Euston to Watford DC Line, London underground Sub surface lines, metropolitan lines, district and circle lines	Third rail with fourth rail bonded to running rail To enable London Underground trains to operate between Queen's Park and Harrow & Wealdstone. Similar bonding arrangements are used on the North London Line between Richmond and Gunnersbury and on the District Line between Putney Bridge and Wimbledon.
660	third rail	United Kingdom		Southern Railway & London & South Western Railway	some areas up to 1939, original standard, mostly upgraded to 750 V (except for sections that operate with LUL stock).
700	third rail	United States	Baltimore, Maryland	Baltimore Metro SubwayLink	
800	third rail	Germany	Berlin	Berlin S-Bahn	discontinued, today 750 V
825	third rail	North Korea	Pyongyang	Pyongyang Metro	uses old 750 V Berlin U-Bahn rolling stock
1000	third rail	United States	San Francisco	Bay Area Rapid Transit	

==== Side contact systems ====
All third rail unless otherwise stated.

Voltage	Country	Location	Name of system	Notes
650	Canada	Vancouver	SkyTrain	Expo Line (1985) and Millennium Line (2006). Linear induction. Uses independent Positive and Negative conductor rails.
850	France	Martigny	Saint-Gervais–Vallorcine railway	
1200	Germany	Hamburg	Hamburg S-Bahn	Since 1940. Used both third rail DC (1200 V) and overhead line AC (6.3 kV 25 Hz) until 1955. Also uses German standard 15 kV AC 16 2/3 Hz overhead electrification on the section between Neugraben and Stade on line S3, opened in December 2007.
1200	United Kingdom	Greater Manchester	Bury Line	Converted to 750 V DC overhead in 1991 for operation by the Manchester Metrolink light rail system

==== Bottom contact systems ====
All third rail unless otherwise stated.

Voltage	Country	Location	Name of system	Notes
550	United States	California	Central California Traction Company	1907–1908, raised to 1,200 V
700	United States	New York	Metro-North Railroad	Hudson and Harlem Lines, southern part of New Haven Line. Original New York Central Railroad electrification scheme to Grand Central Terminal.
825	Belarus	Minsk	Minsk Metro	FSU underground system standard, 825 V substation output, 750 V in rail on average
825	Bulgaria	Sofia	Sofia Metro	Lines 1 and 2
825	Russia	Moscow	Moscow Metro	Nominal voltage: 825 V; allowed range: 550 V – 975 V
825	Russia	Saint Petersburg	Saint Petersburg Metro	Nominal voltage: 825 V; allowed range: 550 V – 975 V
825	Russia	Kazan	Kazan Metro	Nominal voltage: 825 V; allowed range: 550 V – 975 V
825	Russia	Nizhny Novgorod	Nizhny Novgorod Metro	Nominal voltage: 825 V; allowed range: 550 V – 975 V
825	Russia	Novosibirsk	Novosibirsk Metro	Nominal voltage: 825 V; allowed range: 550 V – 975 V
825	Russia	Samara	Samara Metro	Nominal voltage: 825 V; allowed range: 550 V – 975 V
825	Russia	Yekaterinburg	Yekaterinburg Metro	Nominal voltage: 825 V; allowed range: 550 V – 975 V
825	Ukraine	Kyiv	Kyiv Metro	FSU underground systems share the same standard
825	Ukraine	Dnipro	Dnipro Metro	FSU underground systems share the same standard
825	Ukraine	Kharkiv	Kharkiv Metro	FSU underground systems share the same standard
830	Argentina	Buenos Aires	Mitre Line	Retiro – José León Suárez; Retiro – Bartolomé Mitre; Retiro – Tigre
830	Argentina	Buenos Aires	Once – Moreno	Sarmiento Line
850	France	Villefranche	Ligne de Cerdagne	Often referred to as the "Yellow Train"
900	Belgium	Brussels	Brussels Metro	
1200	United States	California	Central California Traction Company	1908–1946

=== Conductor rail systems (AC voltage) ===
All systems are 3-phase unless otherwise noted.

Voltage	Current	Contact	Country	Location	Name of system	Notes
500	50 Hz	top/bottom	Australia	Gold Coast, Queensland	Sea World Monorail	Operated 1986–2021
500	50 Hz	top/bottom	Australia	Gold Coast, Queensland	Oasis Shopping Centre	Operated 1989–2017
500	50 Hz	top/bottom	Australia	Sydney, New South Wales	Sydney Monorail	Operated 1988–2013
600	50 Hz	side	China	Guangzhou	Guangzhou Metro – APM Line	
600	50 Hz	side	Singapore		LRT – Bukit Panjang line	
600	50 Hz	side	Japan	Saitama	New Shuttle	
600	50 Hz	side	Japan	Tokyo	Nippori-Toneri Liner	
600	50 Hz	side	Japan	Tokyo	Yurikamome	
600	60 Hz	side	Japan	Kobe, Hyōgo	Kobe New Transit	
600	60 Hz	side	Japan	Osaka	Osaka Metro – Nankō Port Town Line	
600	60 Hz	side	Japan	Osaka	Kansai International Airport – Wing Shuttle	
600	60 Hz	side	Taiwan	Taoyuan	Taoyuan International Airport – Skytrain	

== Special or unusual types ==
=== DC, plough collection from conductors in conduit below track ===
- London County Council Tramways, later operated by London Transport
- streetcars in New York City (Manhattan), New York
- Washington, D.C. streetcars
- Panama Canal locks' ship handlers (called mules)

=== DC, one ground-level conductor ===
- Wolverhampton Corporation Tramways, England (stud contact) (1902–1921)
- Bordeaux Tramway, France (conductor rail)
- Sydney Light Rail (tramway)
- Rio de Janeiro Light Rail, Brazil

=== DC, two-wire ===
- Greenwich, England. Previously used by trams when in the vicinity of Greenwich Observatory; separate from trolleybus supply.
- Cincinnati, Ohio, US. Tram (streetcar) system used this arrangement throughout, probably due to legal constraints on ground return currents.
- Havana and Guanabacoa, Cuba. Tram (streetcar) systems in both cities used this arrangement.
- Key West Electric Company, Florida, US.
- Lisbon, Portugal. Elevador da Bica, Elevador da Glória and Elevador da Lavra.

=== DC, power from running rails ===
- Gross-Lichterfelde Tramway (1881–1893), 180 V
- Ungerer Tramway (1886–1895)
- transportable railways as a ride for children

=== DC, four-rail ===
Voltage	Type	Contact system	Name of system	Location	Country	Notes
750	Guide bars	Lateral to both guide bars (one guide connected to running rail)	Paris Metro	Paris	France	Rubber-tyred lines only
750	Guide bars	Lateral (positive) and top of running rails (negative) contact	Montreal Metro	Montreal	Canada	Rubber-tyred lines
750	Guide bars	Lateral (positive) and top of running rails (negative) contact	Mexico City Metro	Mexico City	Mexico	Rubber-tyred lines
750	Third and fourth rail	Lateral (positive) and top (negative) contact	Milan Transportation System	Milan	Italy	Metro (only line 1)
630	Third and fourth rail	Top contact	London Underground	London	United Kingdom	Transport for London

== See also ==
- Amtrak's 25 Hz traction power system
- Conduit current collection
- Current collector
- Ground level power supply
- List of tram systems by gauge and electrification
- Railway electrification
- Railroad electrification in the United States
- Third rail
- Traction current pylon
