= ChS7 =

Class of Czech-built electric locomotives for the USSR

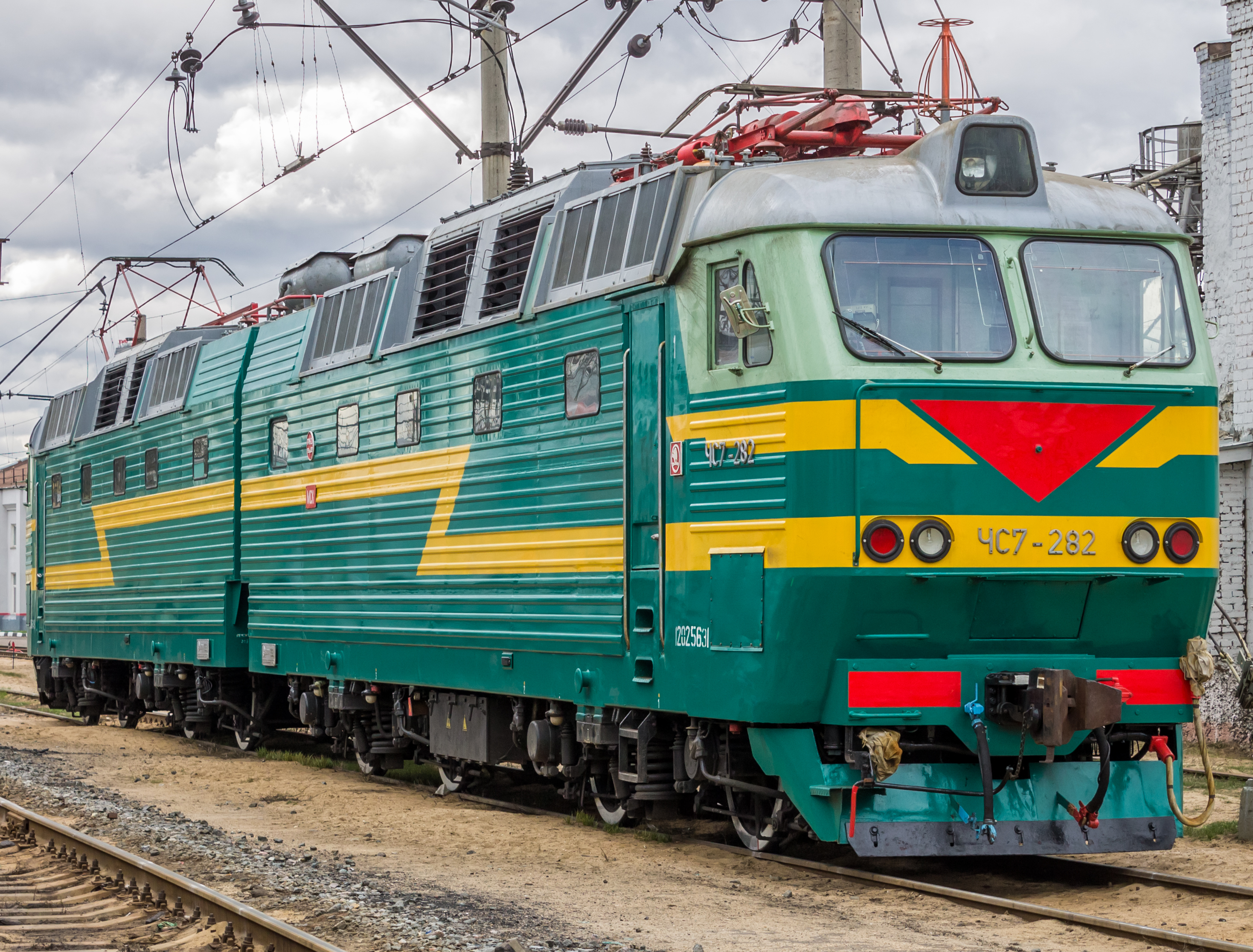
- Electric locomotive ChS7
Type and origin
- Power type: Electric
- Builder: Škoda Works
- Build date: 1983–1999
- Total produced: 321
Specifications
- Gauge: 1,524 mm (5 ft); 1,520 mm (4 ft 11 27/32 in) Russian gauge
- Electric system/s: 3 kV DC Catenary
- Current pickup: Pantograph
Performance figures
- Maximum speed: 160 km/h (99 mph)
Career
- Operators: РЖД (RZhD), УЗ (UZ)
- Locale: Russia; Soviet Union; Ukraine

The ChS7 (Russian: ЧС7) is an electric mainline DC passenger locomotive used in Russia and Ukraine. The locomotive consists of two sections (type 2(2O−2O)) and was produced in years 1983 to 1999 at Škoda's V.I. Lenin plant in Plzeň, Czech Republic. It was specially developed for the railways of Soviet Union with later models procured by Russian and Ukrainian operators. Along with ChS8, the Chs7 is one of the most powerful electric locomotives used in the countries of the former USSR.

== Premise for the appearance ==
By the early 1980s the ridership on the Soviet Railways strongly increased. It was required to increase the number of passenger trains, but this was prevented by an excessively huge freight traffic and an inability to increase the capacity of passenger trains due to the weight the Soviet locomotives of the time could pull. In order to be able to pull passenger trains with more than 30 cars, strong and powerful electric locomotives were required. The backbone of the Soviet Railways at the time, consisting out of the ChS2 (DC) and ChS4 (AC) electric locomotives, as well as of VL60p (passenger version of VL60), didn't suit these needs. The power of those electric locomotives was in the 4200–5100 kW range, while their traction force did not exceed 17400 kg. This was not enough for pulling 30-car passenger trains. In addition their design developed back in the 1950s became obsolete. It is worth to mention that, ChS2 control scheme provided the capability of using two units in a Multiple-unit train control mode. However, there were several limitations - e.g. missing capability to restore traction engine protection of "slave" locomotive from leading locomotive. Eventually the multiple unit mode was used only extremely rarely.

- Since 1971—1972 V. I. Lenin plant in Plzeň started to produce various modifications of ChS2T and ChS4T locomotives. In comparison to their prototypes, those locos were different by a better design, in addition ChS2T was even stronger than its prototype; however their traction force was not sufficient.
- Besides, starting with the second half of the 1970s the party of ChS6 8-axle DC electric locomotives were in use on Oktyabrskaya Railway. These electric locomotives were created on basis of high speed Chs200 locos by means of changing the transition number of traction reductors, while the total power of their engines were 8400 kW.
- However these electric locomotives were not appropriate for pulling heavyweight passenger trains, since the dis-congruence between traction engine power and chain weight (164 tons) did not allow to increase the traction force significantly. IN additions Chs6 locos had only two economical speeds 2 which made their speed range, yet limited. This fashion, their construction required further improvements
- This is the way the Škoda plant in Czechoslovakia (formerly V. I. Lenin plant) in 1980s received an order for building strong and powerful passenger electric locomotives, which were able to pull trains composed of 32 passenger cars.

== Production ==
For a purpose of driving heavy train, by the early 1980s Škoda plant projected universal AC/DC 8-axle locomotive. (Refer to ChS8). They were designated for pulling trains along the hard-to-pass profiles. For the purpose of projecting new electric DC locomotive, ChS6 and ChS200 features were used as a basis; as compared with these two projects, Chs7 featured several modifications.

== See also ==
- The Museum of the Moscow Railway, at Paveletsky Rail Terminal, Moscow
- Rizhsky Rail Terminal, Home of the Moscow Railway Museum
- Varshavsky Rail Terminal, Saint Petersburg, Home of the Central Museum of Railway Transport, Russia
- History of rail transport in Russia
