= Electrification of Saint Petersburg Railway Division =

Electrification of Saint Petersburg Railway Division. Direct lines from Saint Petersburg Finlyandsky–Vyborg and Saint Petersburg Finlyandsky–Beloostrov through Sestroretsk continued to work with steam haulage after the Russian Revolution up to World War II.

== First project ==
In 1930, the first project for electrification of a railroad line of seashore–Beloostrov rings was developed. But the state boundary was in the urban-type settlement Beloostrov, and the authorities did not improve the transport accessibility area. They rightly believed that the availability of suburban passenger electric trains would increase the number of summer residents in direction of traffic.

== Implementation ==
Without waiting for the end of the war, the chief of department of electrification of the October Railway Kirillov made an application for electrification of the seashore–Beloostrov rings and directions to station Terioki addressed to the Leningrad city town committee VKP managing transport department. After the war, the state border was pushed to a distance of more than 100 kilometers (over Vyborg) and the electrification program was not hampered.

== Documents ==
Documents were issued on the basis of which the electrification of the Leningrad – Zelenogorsk line was authorized:

- Decision of the Council of Ministers of the USSR No. 858-316, dated 4 March 1950;
- The order of the Minister of Communications Beschev B. P. No. 176/Ц dated 17 May 1950;
- The final draft prepared by the Institute Lengiprotrans, engineers Keltuyala and Mazursky.

== Timeline of electrification ==
- Finlyandsky Rail Terminal–Zelenogorsk – 1951
- Zelenogorsk–Ushkovo – 1952
- Ushkovo–Roshchino – 1954
- Roshchino–Kirillovskoye – 1968
- Kirillovskoye–Vyborg – 1969
- Vyborg–Luzhayka – 1977
- International connection – 1978

== Picture gallery ==
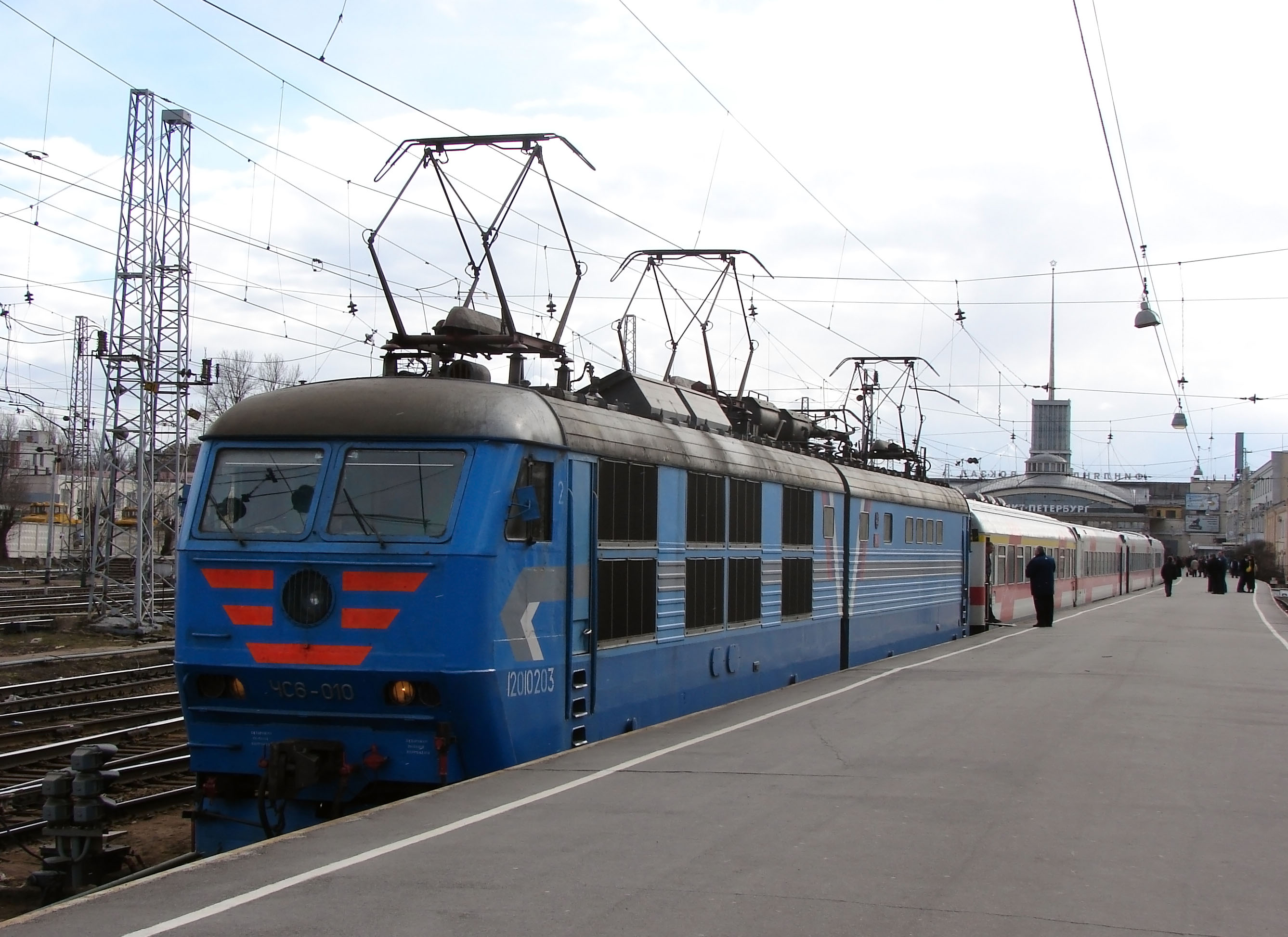
Electric locomotive with "Sibelius" train (Saint-Petersburg, Russia – Helsinki, Finland) in 2007

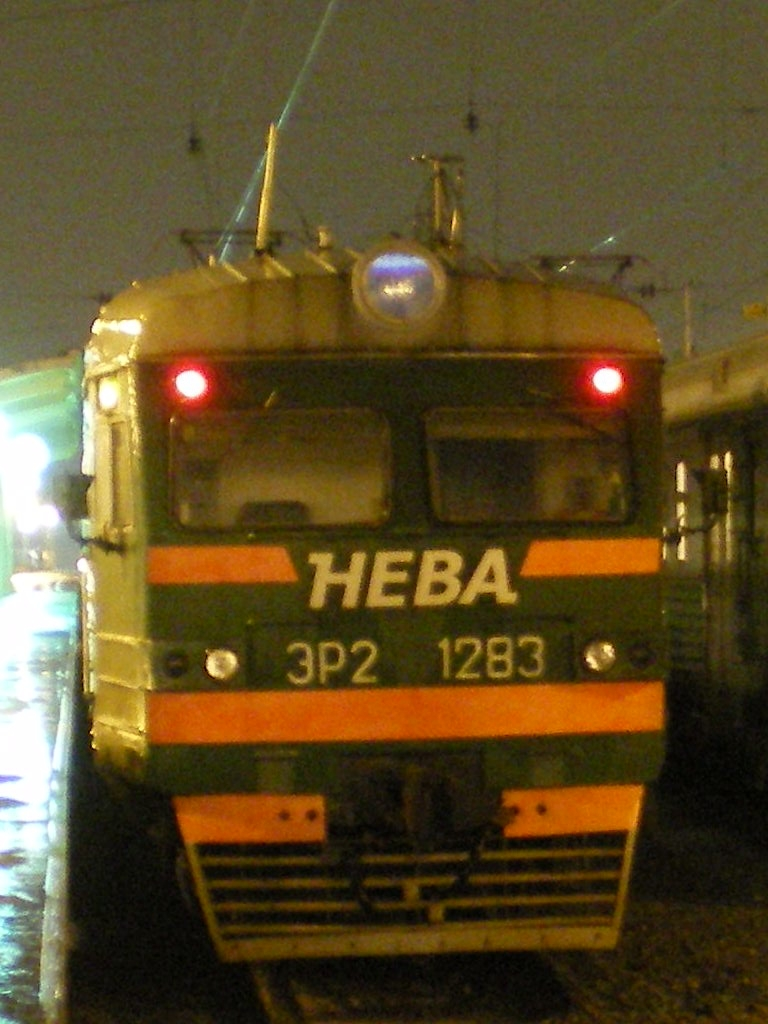
Train under the name NEVA at the Finlyandsky Rail Terminal, Saint Petersburg, Russia, in 2009

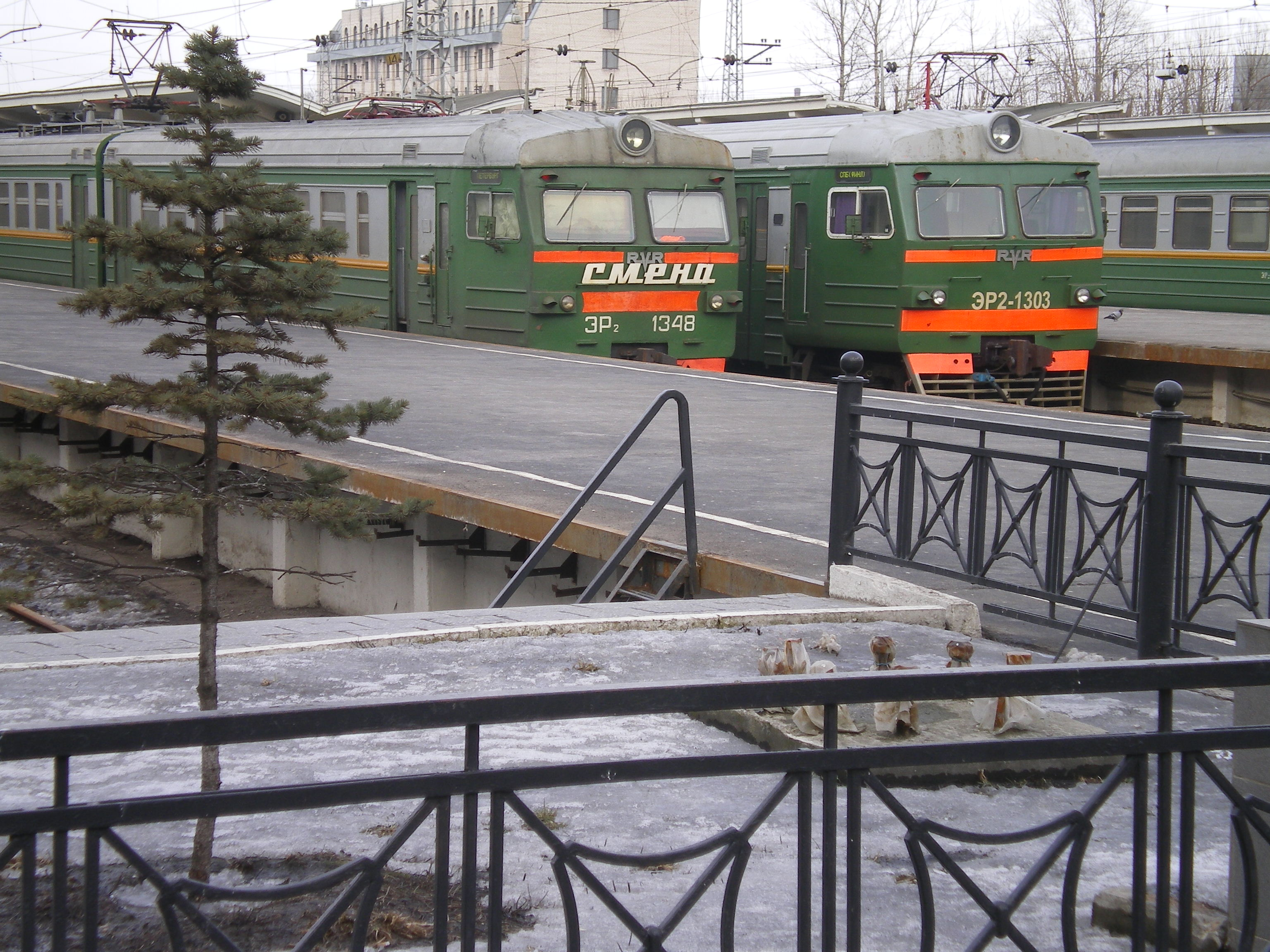
Train under the name Change at the Finlyandsky Rail Terminal, Saint Petersburg, Russia, in 2009

== See also ==
- History of rail transport in Russia
- Miller's line
- Rail transport in the Soviet Union
- Railway electrification in the Soviet Union
- Riihimäki – Saint Petersburg Railway
