= Railway electrification in Norway =

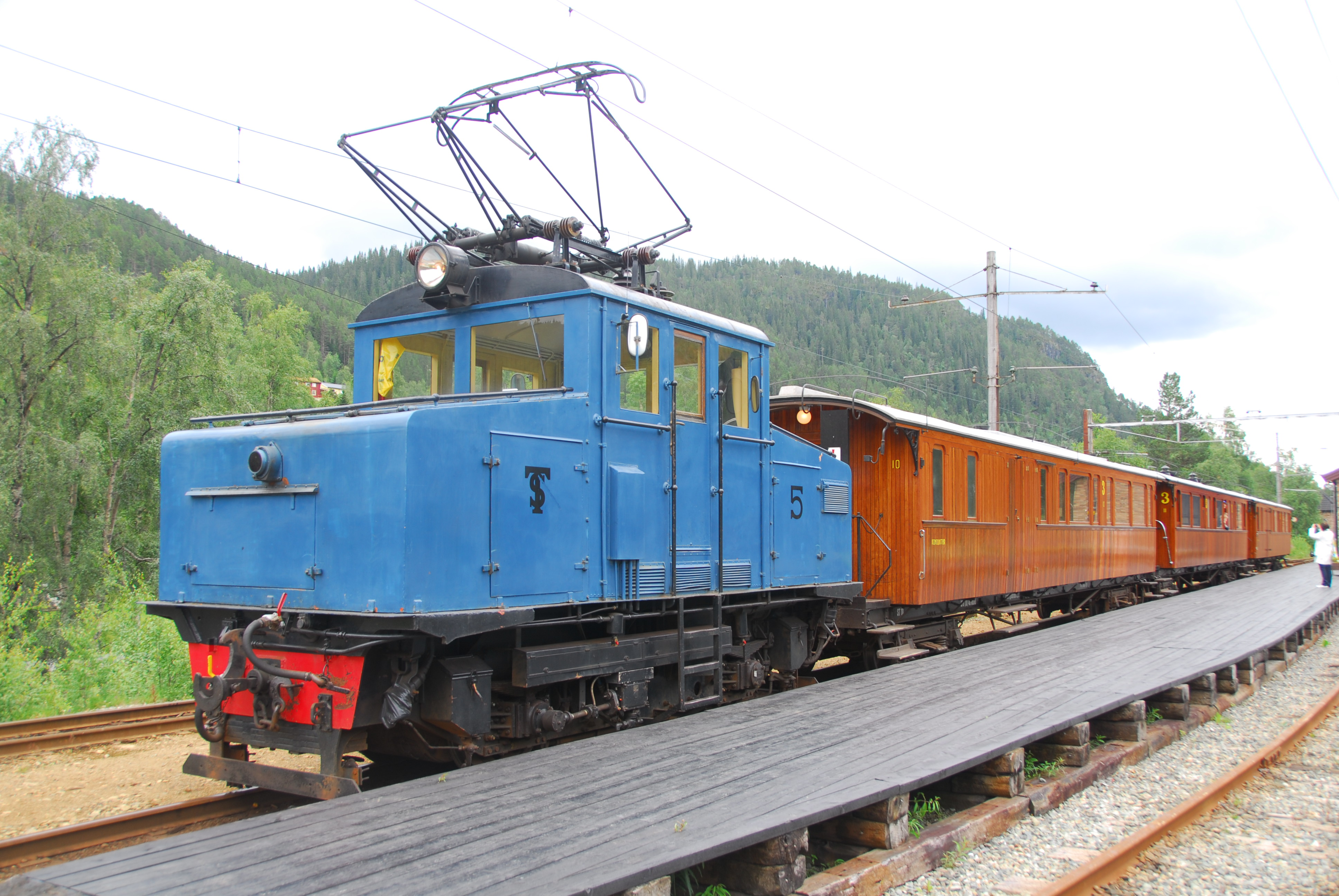
The Thamshavn Line became Norway's first electrified when it opened in 1908.

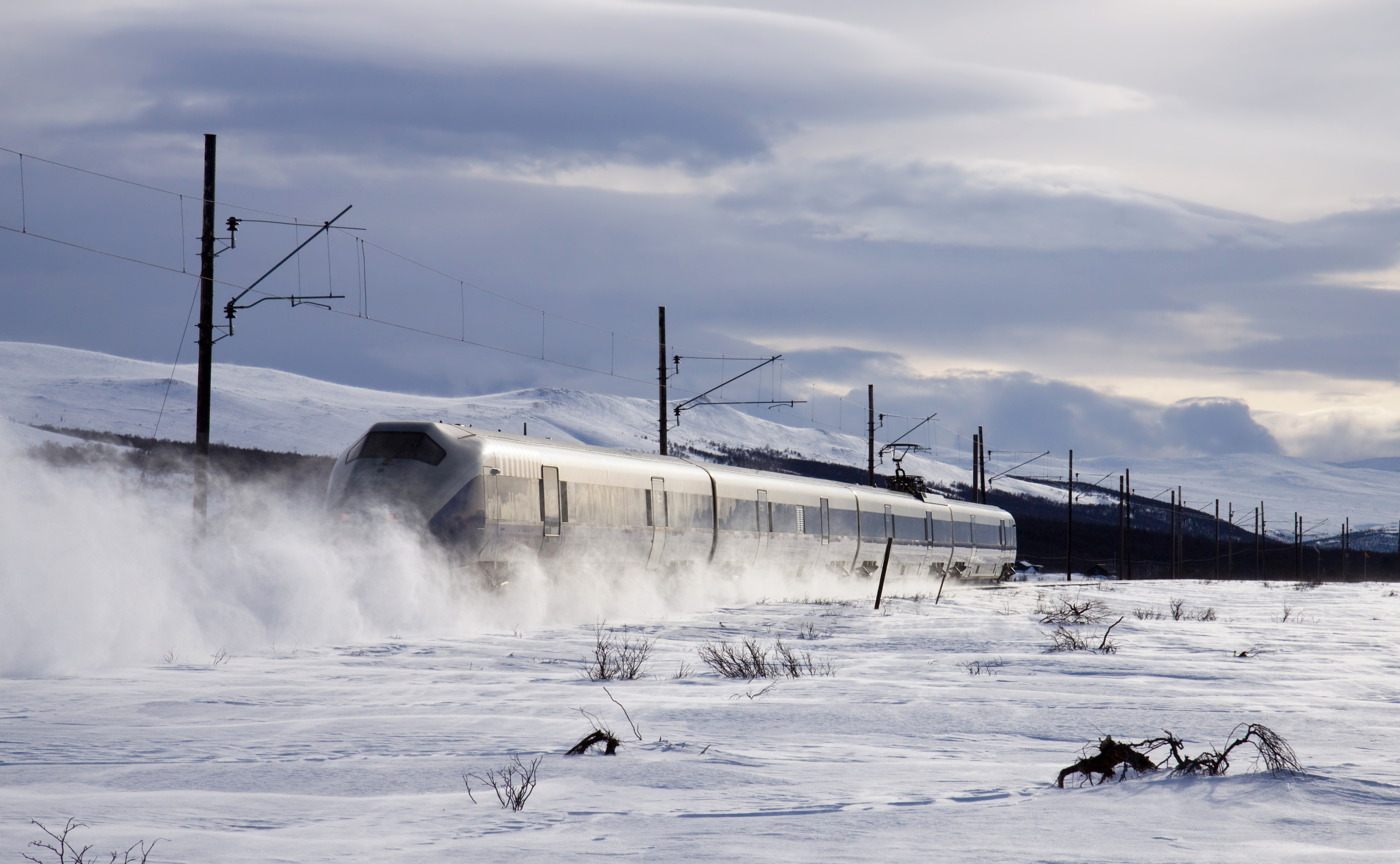
Class 73 train near Dombås on the Dovre Line

The Norwegian railway network consists of 2,552 kilometers (1,586 mi) of electrified railway lines, constituting 62% of the Norwegian National Rail Administration's 4,114 kilometers (2,556 mi) of line. In 2008, electric traction accounted for 90% of the passenger kilometers, 93% of the tonne kilometers and 74% of the energy consumption of all trains running in Norway, with the rest being accounted for by diesel traction.

== History ==
=== Early schemes ===
Technology for electric railways was demonstrated in Germany in 1879; the first revenue line took electric traction into use in 1881. The first electric industrial railway in Norway opened in 1892 at Skotfos Bruk near Skien. Two years later, parts of the Oslo Tramway were electrified. The first alternating current (AC) line became operational in 1892, while the first line to use a single-phase, single overhead wire power supply opened in Germany in 1903. In 1912, all German railway agreed to use the 15 kV 16.7 Hz AC standard, which was later adopted first by Sweden and then by NSB. Several of the private lines that preceded NBS's electrification chose different standards. Sydvaranger chose to install the only mainline direct current (DC) and third rail system.

=== Mainline systems ===
The first three mainline systems to be electrified were private ore-hauling lines. The Thamshavn Line opened in 1909, and remained in revenue use until 1973, after which it was converted to a heritage railway. It is the world's oldest remaining alternating-current railway and the only narrow gauge railway in the country to have been electrified. It was followed by Norsk Transport's Rjukan and Tinnos Lines two years later, and Sydvaranger's Kirkenes–Bjørnevatn Line in 1922. The Norwegian State Railways' (NSB) first electrification was parts of the Drammen Line in 1922 and the ore-hauling Ofoten Line in 1923, which connects to the Ore Line in Sweden. The use of El 1 locomotives on the Drammen Line proved a large cost-saver over steam locomotives, and NSB started electrifying other lines around Oslo; from 1927 to 1930, the remainder of the Drammen Line, and the continuation along the Randsfjord and Sørland Lines to Kongsvinger were converted, along with the first section of the Trunk Line. In 1935, the Hardanger Line became the first section of new NSB track to be electrified. From 1936 to 1940, NSB electrified the Østfold Line as well as more of the Sørland Line and the Bratsberg Line, connecting all electric lines west of Oslo.

=== The 1940s onwards ===
During the 1940s, NSB electrified the Sørland Line, although the final section from Egersund to Stavanger was not converted until 1956. In 1957, the Kirkenes–Bjørnevatn Line became the only line to remove the electrification and replace the electric locomotives with diesel power. The 1950s saw the electrification of several of regional and commuter lines around Oslo, including the Kongsvinger Line, the Trunk Line and the Dovre Line from Lillestrøm to Hamar, the Vestfold Line and the Eastern Østfold Line. This was largely due to NSB's program to remove all steam locomotives, either by electrification or by dieselization. In the late 1950s and 1960s, several to-be electrified lines were operated with diesel locomotives as an interim solution. The 1960s saw the remaining two stem lines in Southern Norway, the Bergen and Dovre Lines, electrified along with the Gjøvik Line. The Bergen Line was completed in 1964 and the Dovre Line completed in 1970. This finished all the planned electrifications, and the authorities deemed the remaining lines unprofitable to electrify because of low traffic. During the 1990s, a new program was attempted, this time to electrify the entire network, but only the Arendal Line was converted before the program was canceled. However, new lines around Oslo, including the Lieråsen and Oslo Tunnels on the Drammen Line, and the Gardermoen and Asker Lines were electrified at the time they opened.

== System ==
=== 15 kV / 16 2/3 Hz - AC-System ===
Norway, like Germany, Austria and Switzerland, uses single phase 15 kV AC railway electrification at 16 2/3 Hz (precisely) for electric train systems. However, there are differences in the supply of power. Nearly all power is derived from rotary converters or static inverters in the substations, which are fed with three-phase AC of 50 Hertz from the public grid. There are only two power stations generating single phase AC. That at Kjofossen, feeds its power directly in the overhead wire, while that at Hakavik supplies a small 55 kV single phase AC network, which feeds five substations. However at two substations, there are also converters. In earlier days, Nygårds Hydroelectric Power Station delivered single phase AC for line between Narvik and Kiruna. The single phase AC line running to Sweden is now used between 68°26′51″N 17°27′27″E and 68°25′33″N 18°0′15″E as the 15 kV line for feeding the overhead wire.

==== Description ====
From Haugevik Power Plant, two 55 kV long single phase AC powerlines depart, one to Sande and the other to Sundhaugen Switching Station. At Sundhaugen Switching Station, the lines depart: one over Skollenborg railway substation and Noragutu Substation to Neslandsvatn Substation and the other to Asker substation, which has an interesting track. It runs from Sundhaugen Switching Station northward and shares north of Foss at 59°43′05″N 9°51′38″E the towers of a three phase AC lines. It runs then eastwards and passes three substations:

- Mjondalen at 59°44′41″N 10°01′02″E
- Langum at 59°44′48″N 10°06′46″E
- Lierbyen at 59°47′43″N 10°15′10″E

South of Ulvenvn substation at 59°48′20″N 10°20′13″E, it runs again on own towers overhead until termination tower at 59°49′26″N 10°24′33″E. The rest of line is underground.

==== Power stations ====
Name Town Power Year of inauguration Coordinates

Name	Town	Power	Year of inauguration	Coordinates
Hakavik	Øvre Eiker	7 MW	1922	59°37′29″N 9°57′13″E
Kjofossen	Sogn og Fjordane	3.5 MW	194?	60°44′49″N 07°08′05″E

==== Substations fed from 55 kV grid ====
Place	Coordinates
Asker	59°49′48″N 10°25′46″E
Neslandsvatn	58°58′32″N 9°09′11″E
Nordagutu	59°25′8″N 9°19′19″E
Sande	59°35′0″N 10°12′27″E
Skollenberg	59°37′21″N 9°41′32″E

==== Switching stations ====
Place	Coordinates
Sundhaugen	59°41′51″N 9°50′30″E

==== Substations with converters ====
In Norway nearly all railway substations uses motor-generators which converts three phase AC from public grid into single phase AC. Most of these device are mounted on rail-cars for quick replacement. Some substations are in blind-ending tunnels.

The list may be incomplete and coordinates may be incorrect.

Place	Technology	Power	Year of inauguration	Coordinates
Alnabru				59°55′46″N 10°49′53″E
Asker				59°49′48″N 10°25′46″E
Bergen				60°23′12″N 5°20′19″E
Dale				60°34′55″N 5°48′24″E
Dombas				62°03′47″N 9°07′34″E
Fåberg				61°09′49″N 10°24′23″E
Fron				61°34′15″N 9°52′45″E
Ganddal				58°48′37″N 5°42′2″E
Haugastøl				60°30′41″N 7°52′21″E
Holmlia				59°49′42″N 10°47′55″E
Hønefoss				60°11′57″N 10°09′11″E
Jessheim				60°8′33″N 11°09′06″E
Kielland				58°29′42″N 6°01′58″E
Kongsvinger				60°11′26″N 11°59′11″E
Krossen				58°9′12″N 7°57′31″E
Larvik				59°2′55″N 10°3′45″E
Leivoll				58°16′01″N 7°27′09″E
Lillestrøm				59°57′12″N 11°03′28″E?
Lundamo				63°09′09″N 10°16′56″E?
Lunner				60°17′49″N 10°35′08″E
Mjøllfell				60°41′40″N 6°50′25″E
Narvik				68°24′15″N 17°46′51″E
Nelaug				58°39′33″N 8°37′39″E
Neslandsbyen				60°34′46″N 9°6′34″E
Nordagutu				59°25′8″N 9°19′19″E
Otta				61°46′58″N 9°32′32″E
Rudshøgda				60°54′57″N 10°49′16″E
Sarpborg				59°16′37″N 11°05′27″E
Sira				58°24′50″N 6°39′44″E
Smørbekk				59°30′12″N 10°42′56″E
Ski				59°43′11″N 10°50′0″E
Skoppum				59°22′40″N 10°24′36″E
Stavne				63°24′50″N 10°23′0″E
Tangen				60°37′26″N 11°15′16″E

=== Other systems ===
The Oslo Tramway and the Oslo Metro both use 750 V DC, the tramway via an overhead wire and the metro via third rail. The tramway previously used 600 V DC, while its Ekeberg Line used 1,200 V DC.

== Future ==
Further plans have been launched, in particular the section of the Nordland Line from Trondheim to Steinkjer, which is part of the Trøndelag Commuter Rail, and the Meråker Line, which connects to the electrified Middle Line in Sweden.

== See also ==
- Timeline of railway electrification in Norway
