= Ungerer Tramway =

Coordinates: 48.171°N 11.596°E

The Ungerer Tramway was the first electrical tramway in Munich, built in 1886 by engineer and owner of the Ungerer Bath, August Ungerer. It was designed to connect the bath with the 750 m distant stop of the horse powered tramway. The 1.2 km long Ungerer Tramway existed from 1 July 1886 to June 1895, when it was adjusted because of the extension of the horse tramway to the north cemetery. The current supply was made with x volt as at the Gross-Lichterfelde Tramway by the rails, which began only some meters after the last stops, which were increased. Thus for a start of the trip the brakes were loosened, whereby the train loose-rolled by the force of gravity, before it began to drive electrically. The vehicle shed with the clock tower for the two green motor coaches with gold ornament and two summer cars still stood in the year 1944.
