= Railway electrification in France =

Map of railway electrification in France as of 2025. Other versions of this map in medium and large formats.

There are 15,687 kilometres (9,747 mi) of electrified railways in France, making up approximately 55% of the network in use.

For historical reasons there are two norms of electrification that coexist in France: 1,500 V DC and 25 kV 50 Hz AC.

The electrification of the French railway network was made in four phases. First, at the start of the 20th century, there was a phase of testing and technological exploration. Third rails and overhead lines were on trial in some lines in France; different voltages were tried. Afterwards, in the 1920s, the main lines starting from Paris and lines in the Pyrenees were electrified with 1,500 V DC.

After World War II and with the improvements in power electronics, tests were made with 20 kV AC and subsequently with 25 kV AC in the Alps, which was considered satisfactory. Then the North and the East of France were electrified with 25 kV AC, and some lines were electrified with 1,500 V DC in the South. From the 1970s, the electrification of the French network has continued mainly with 25 kV to bring electrically powered TGVs to some cities.

The use of two norms of electrification was a huge problem for the SNCF up to the 1970s, because there was not much equipment able to run under both standards. Today, all electrical equipment ordered by the SNCF can use both 25 kV AC and 1,500 V DC.
