= ChS8 =

Electric mainline AC passenger locomotive

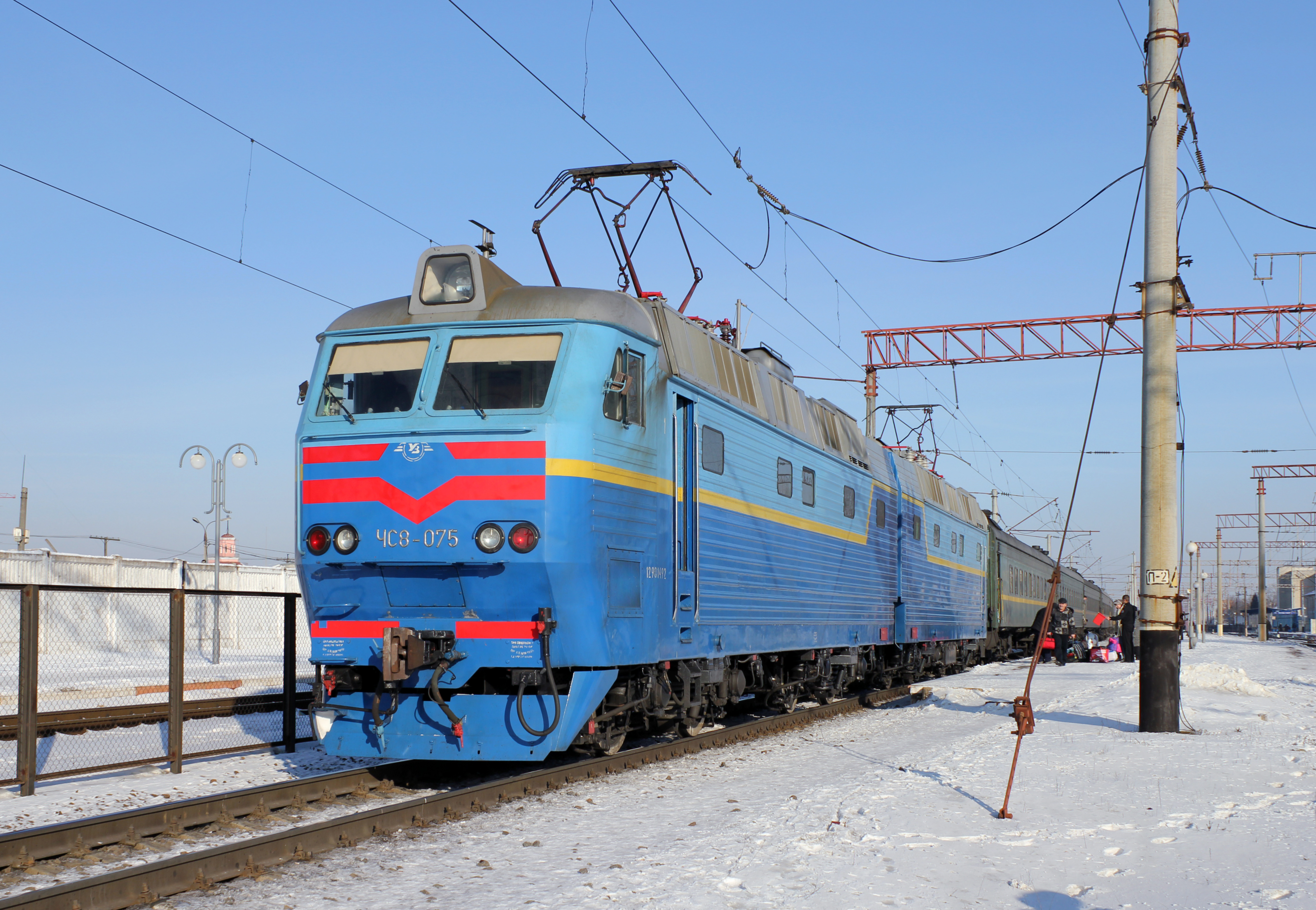
- Electric locomotive ChS8-075
Type and origin
- Power type: Electric
- Builder: Škoda Works
- Build date: 1983–89
- Total produced: 82
Specifications
- Gauge: 1,524 mm (5 ft); 1,520 mm (4 ft 11 27/32 in) Russian gauge
- Length: 33,740 mm (110 ft 8 in)
- Width: 3,000 mm (9 ft 10 in)
- Electric system/s: 25 kV 50 Hz AC Catenary
- Current pickup: Pantograph
- Train heating: 1,500 kW
Performance figures
- Maximum speed: 180 km/h (110 mph)
- Power output: 7,200 kW
Career
- Operators: РЖД (RZhD), УЗ (UZ)
- Locale: Russia; Soviet Union; Ukraine

The ChS8 (Russian: ЧС8) is an electric mainline AC passenger locomotive used in Russia and Ukraine.

The 8 axle locomotive was developed for pulling long passenger trains (28–32 carriages) at speeds around 100 km/h or faster. In 1983 the first two experimental locomotives were constructed and delivered to Kyiv for tests and adjustment. In 1987 30 locomotives were built as a mass model. In 1989 last 50 locomotives were built.

As the most powerful AC passenger locomotive in USSR designed for long trains, ChS8 experienced a low demand when after the disintegration of the USSR passenger turnover in both Russia and Ukraine fell significantly. After 2010 Russian railways turned to more energy-effective EP10 and EP20 as powerful locomotives for fast or long passenger trains.

== See also ==
- The Museum of the Moscow Railway, at Paveletsky Rail Terminal, Moscow
- Rizhsky Rail Terminal, Home of the Moscow Railway Museum
- Varshavsky Rail Terminal, St.Petersburg, Home of the Central Museum of Railway Transport, Russian Federation
- History of rail transport in Russia
