= After the Bath =

After the Bath may refer to:

== Paintings ==
- After the Bath (Renoir), a 1910 painting
  - After the Bath, an 1888 painting by Pierre-Auguste Renoir
- After the Bath, Woman Drying Herself, a drawing by Edgar Degas, c. 1890
- After the Bath, an 1870 painting by Frédéric Bazille
- After the Bath, an 1875 painting by Andrei Belloli
- After the Bath, a painting by Paul Louis Bouchard (1853–1937)
- After the Bath, an 1875 painting by William-Adolphe Bouguereau
  - After the Bath, an 1894 painting by William-Adolphe Bouguereau at the Ricardo Brennand Institute
- After the Bath, a 1901 painting by Mary Cassatt
- After the Bath, a painting by William Powell Frith (1819–1909)
- After the Bath, a painting by John Henry Hatfield, 1896 second-place Hallgarten Prize-winner
- After the Bath, a, 1892 painting by Edvard Munch
- After the Bath, a 1924 painting by Károly Patkó
- After the Bath, or Venus Rising from the Sea—A Deception, an 1822 painting by Raphaelle Peale
- After the Bath, a 1911 painting by E. Phillips Fox
- After the Bath, a 1910 painting by Théo van Rysselberghe
- After the Bath, a painting by S. G. Thakur Singh (1899–1976)
- Efter badet (Norwegian, 'After the Bath'), an 1889 painting by Olaf Isaachsen
- Efter badet (Danish, 'After the Bath'), a 1911 painting by Fritz Syberg

== Sculptures ==
- After the Bath, a sculpture by Frano Kršinić (1897–1982)
- After the Bath, a sculpture by Pietro Lazzarini (1842–1918)
- Efter badet (Swedish, 'After the Bath'), a 1976 sculpture by Pye Engström
- Etter badet (Norwegian, 'After the Bath'), a sculpture by Anders Svor (1864–1929)
