= Art Gallery of Uzbekistan =

Coordinates: 41°18′56.0″N 69°16′16.4″E

- "O'zbekiston Tasviriy San'at Galereyasi"
- Established: 2004
- Location: Tashkent city, Uzbekistan
- Type: Public, art gallery, art museum
- Founder: Islam Karimov

The Art Gallery of Uzbekistan is a museum in Tashkent, Uzbekistan. Established after independence in 1991, it is one of the most visited modern museums in Uzbekistan.

== History ==
The museum is one of the newest in Uzbekistan. It first opened to visitors in August 2004. However, its history goes back to 1994, when President Islam Karimov sought a home for the fine art collection of the National Bank for Foreign Economic Activity. It was originally established as an art gallery, but as interest grew, a full-fledged exhibition space was opened.

The museum has 15 rooms spread over 3,500 square metres. There is a conference room, a lecture hall, a small cinema hall, a library, and a studio for masterclasses and workshops. The gallery mounts international and local exhibitions, and hosts cultural events.

The Art Gallery of Uzbekistan, located in Tashkent, is open to the public every day except Sunday and Monday.

== See also ==
- State Museum of History of Uzbekistan
- The Museum of Health Care of Uzbekistan
- The Museum of Communication History in Uzbekistan
- Museum of Arts of Uzbekistan
- Tashkent Museum of Railway Techniques
- Museum of Geology, Tashkent
- Tashkent Polytechnical Museum
- The Alisher Navoi State Museum of Literature
- Museum of Victims of Political Repression in Tashkent
- State Museum of Nature of Uzbekistan
- Tashkent Planetarium
- Art Station in Samarkand
