= The Museum of Communication History in Uzbekistan =

First Uzbek museum of communication technologies

- Aloqa Tarixi Muzeyi
- Established: 2009
- Location: Tashkent Uzbekistan
- Type: Public
- Founder: Uzbekistan
- Director: R.A Askarov

The Museum of Communication History in Uzbekistan, is a unique and the first museum in the history of Uzbekistan which is related to the communication technologies. It was established in 2009, and nowadays the museum became one of the most famous museums among Uzbek people.

== History and Museum these days ==
“The Museum of Communication History in Uzbekistan'’ was established by the Uzbek fund called "Communication and communication history national fund", in 2009. The main purpose of the creation was showing and contributing right information about the history of communication and communication objects in Uzbekistan among young generation. The museum is expanding every year, new expositions are being added to the archive of the museum and they are publicly available for the interested people. "The Museum of Communication History in Uzbekistan'’ has exactly 7100 expositions related to the communication topics. About more than 65000 thousand people have visited the museum from its first day of establishment. There is a conference hall at the museum, which in 2014 held more than 40 conferences and presentations on communication field. The year 2014 was productive for the museum, as the new four big expositions were created in that year. There is a cinema center at the museum, which allows the visitors to have a virtual look on famous 20 museums of Uzbekistan and to the other world museums. There are some sponsors of the museum instead of "Communication and communication history national fund", who invest some money for the development of the museum. Current director of the museum is R.A Askarov.

== All about the main building ==
“The Museum of Communication History in Uzbekistan'’ is a modern museum with three level building, which contains all the achievements and stages of development of communication technologies in Uzbekistan. The most number of the expositions are mainly given by private persons. The museum is planned logically, so that after passing each stage of the building the one will move on and see changes in communication technologies with respect to time. In the building of the museum people can start their own exhibitions related to the communication technologies. And one of the interesting facts is that, any visitor can use and make a call on the antique phones which can share the signals for a few meters.

=== Expositions ===
“The Museum of Communication History in Uzbekistan'’ is very rich for its exhibits, as the number of the expositions is estimated to be more than 7000 thousand pieces. However, there are some big stands which make the museum unique in Uzbekistan. Right after entering the museum the one can see the big mail wagon which was the distributor of mail for several centuries.

The biggest stand at the museum is called "O'zbekiston pochtasi" (Uzbek mail) and it tells about the communication and message sharing during the Middle Ages. There are some models of fortresses with signal fires built in the days of Timurides' reign, messenger-pigeons. The last object on the stand is related to the mail in modern Uzbekistan. One of the most important objects at the museum is exposition of the first ever cell phone in the history of Uzbekistan, which was first used by the President of Republic Uzbekistan Islam Karimov. And the cellular telephone which is exhibited at the museum was made in 1992 and Islam Karimov was the first person in Uzbekistan to speak on it. That moment was the starting point of cellular communication development in Uzbekistan on the day of 26 August.

There is another interesting stand at "The Museum of Communication History in Uzbekistan" which shows the development of telecommunication in Uzbekistan. The exposition shows to the visitors the models of telephones that were used in Uzbekistan from the beginning of the 20th century. Most of the telephones are very old, but they all are connected to the telephone line, which means that any visitor can use them if they wish. Another noticeable stand at the museum is the stand which shows the collection of postage stamps which were used in Uzbekistan after the Independence, as well as postcards and greeting-cards. The mostly seen objects in the museum are television sets. Because, history of the television is directly connected with Uzbekistan.

== Location ==
“The Museum of Communication History in Uzbekistan" is located at Navoi St 28a, Tashkent, Tashkent city. The museum is open for visitors for 7 hours per day. It is sometimes referred to as the "Museum of Telecommunication". It is not to be confused with the "Museum of the History of Communications" in Khiva.

== See also ==
- State Museum of History of Uzbekistan
- The Museum of Health Care of Uzbekistan
- Tashkent Museum of Railway Techniques
- Museum of Arts of Uzbekistan
- Museum of Victims of Political Repression in Tashkent
- State Museum of Nature of Uzbekistan
- Tashkent Poly-technical Museum
- The Alisher Navoi State Museum of Literature
- Art Gallery of Uzbekistan
- Geology Museum in Tashkent
- Tashkent Planetarium
