= State Museum of Nature of Uzbekistan =

- "O'zbekiston Davlat Tabiat Muzeyi"
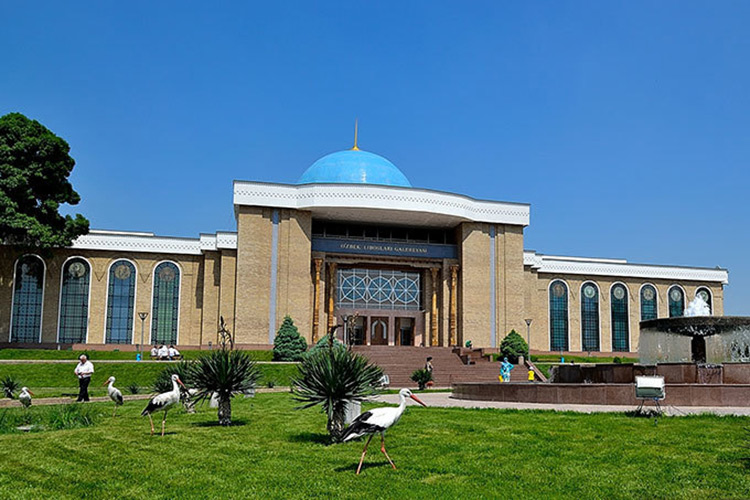

- Location within Uzbekistan
- Established: 1876
- Location: Tashkent, Uzbekistan
- Coordinates: 41.3295°N 69.2388°E
- Type: Public, nature museum
- Collection size: 363,059
- Website: https://tabiatmuzey.uz/

The Uzbekistan State Museum of Nature (Uzbek: Tabiat muzeyi) is one of the oldest museums in Uzbekistan. The museum's main purpose is to show the natural beauty of Uzbekistan and to help protect its environment. The museum features chronologically-ordered exhibits and seeks to educate visitors about Uzbekistan's geography through time.

== Contents ==
The Museum consists of about 400,000 specimens and artefacts that are on display. Three hundred thousand items are insects. Eleven thousand are herbarium leaves and other zoological and geological materials. The museum is visited mainly by Uzbeks and visitors from formerly-Soviet Union countries.

The four areas in the museum are geological-geographic department, flora and fauna department, scientific department and funds department.

The museum organizes many social events in Tashkent, including assemblies in many of the Republic's schools, academic lyceums, colleges and higher education facilities.

== History ==
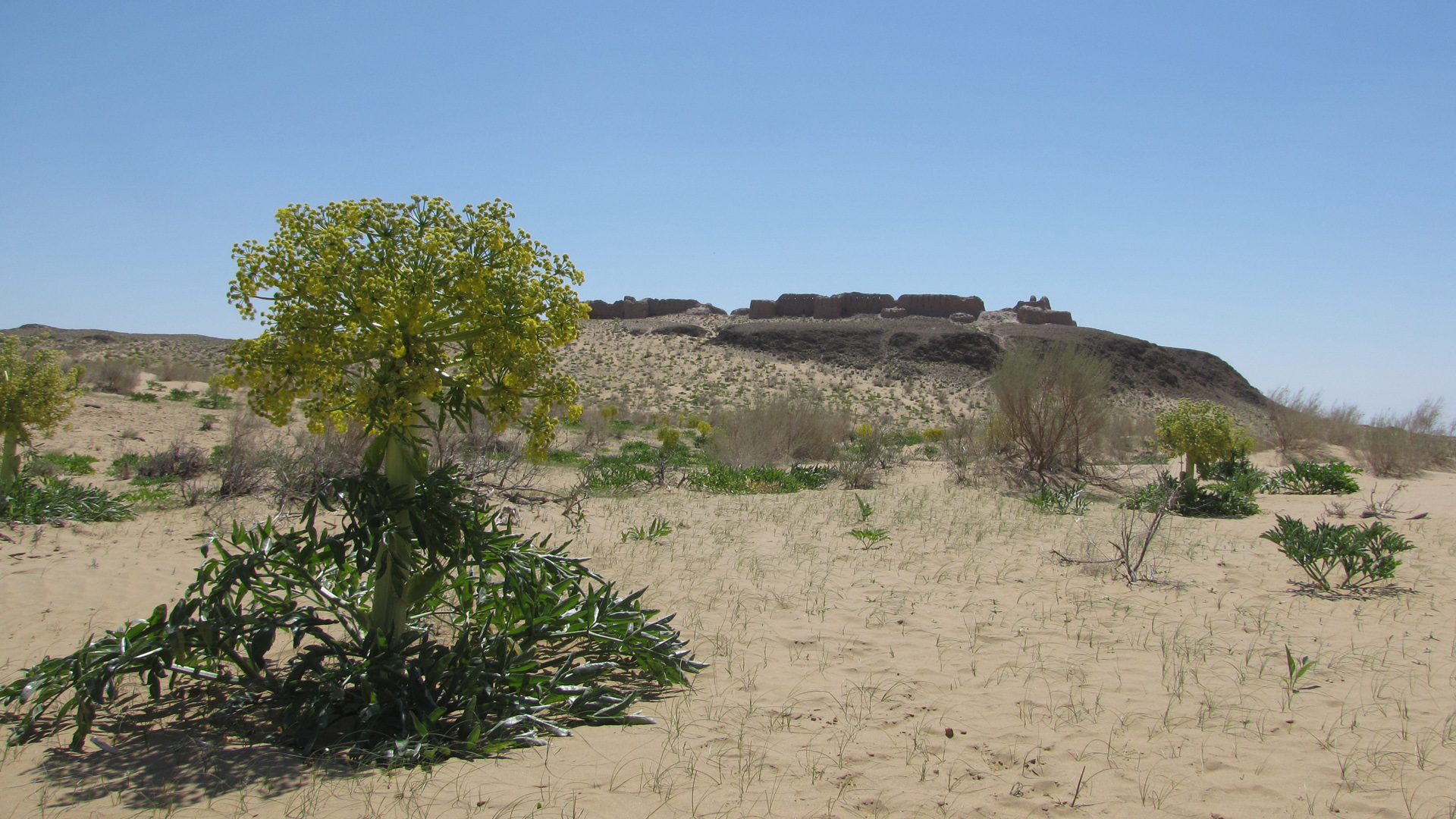
Flora and nature of Uzbekistan

The Museum is the oldest in Uzbekistan. It was established in Tashkent by Russian scientists on July 12, 1876, as the Tashkent Museum. The museum closed and re-opened several times. In 1919, it opened as Turkestan National Museum. Two years later, in 1921, it became The State Museum of Nature of Uzbekistan. In 1930, the museum joined with the agricultural museum and became the "Central Asian Museum of Nature and Building Power". Five years later the museum took its current name. In 1937, the museum opened a classroom for students to receive lectures on Uzbekistan nature.

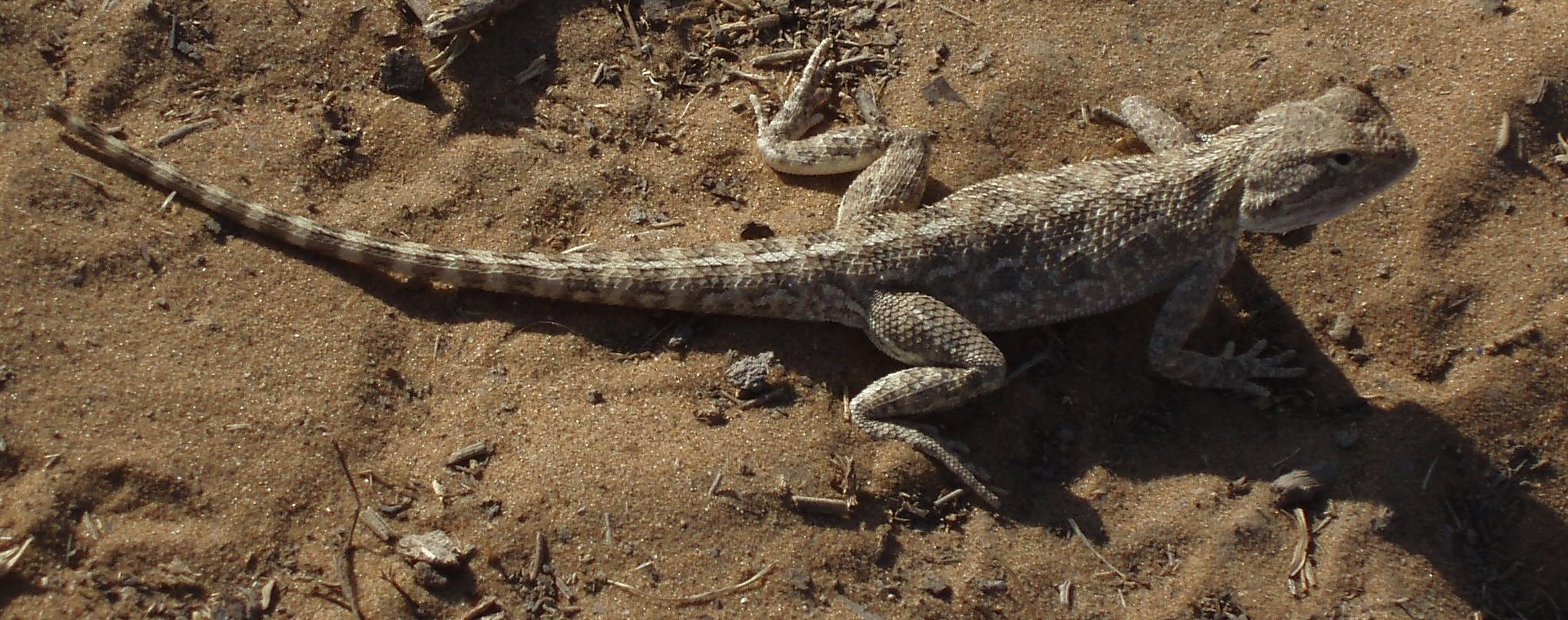
Fauna and Nature of Uzbekistan

The museum has received many government awards for its contribution to the development of the academic sphere in Uzbekistan. In 1967, the museum was awarded "Uzbekistan's Best Museum". In 2006, the museum celebrated its 130-year anniversary.

== See also ==
- State Museum of History of Uzbekistan
- The Museum of Health Care of Uzbekistan
- The Museum of Communication History in Uzbekistan
- Museum of Arts of Uzbekistan
- Tashkent Museum of Railway Techniques
- Museum of Geology, Tashkent
- Tashkent Poly-technical Museum
- The Alisher Navoi State Museum of Literature
- Museum of Victims of Political Repression in Tashkent
- Art Gallery of Uzbekistan
- Tashkent Planetarium
