= Tashkent Polytechnical Museum =

Coordinates: 41°18′26.4″N 69°16′42.1″E

- Toshkent Politexnika Muzeyi
- Established: 10 November 2015
- Location: Tashkent, Uzbekistan
- Type: Public, technological museum
- Website: politomuseum.uz

The Tashkent Polytechnical Museum is an automotive museum in Tashkent, Uzbekistan. The museum provides technical and mechanical information about cars made from 1800 to 1900, focusing on the history of automobile technology and production in Uzbekistan and around the world. It is located in the Mirabad district of Tashkent.

== History ==
The Tashkent Polytechnical Museum was established on 10 November 2015.

== Exhibits ==
In the close center of Tashkent, a considerable short walk from Amir Timur Square, there is the Tashkent Polytechnic Museum. This is considered to be a unique museum for Uzbekistan, and also one of the newest - its opening took place in November 2015. Its exposition can be divided into two parts: the automotive industry and the natural sciences.

The Museum's main building holds four areas, The History of the World's Automobile Construction, The History of Automobile Technologies in Uzbekistan, Interactive Practice and Kids Land.

=== The History of the World's Automobile Construction ===
This area provides visitors with information on the invention of the wheel and the first car. One display is devoted to the automobile industry in the late 1950s and an exhibition on the development of agricultural machinery that recounts the history of agricultural development in Uzbekistan in chronological order, from simple agricultural tools to large machinery, such as tractors. Some of the other displays include Ford Zone (1924), Universal (1934), Axos-34, GAZ-13 and Moskvich-400.

=== The History of Automobile Technologies in Uzbekistan ===
This exhibition highlights notable periods in automobile history. The exhibition centers around the Spark Car, which was produced in Uzbekistan in cooperation with General Motors. An original Spark Car is displayed. Many of the tools used in automobile manufacturing are on display including the 3D mapping technology used to develop the Spark Car.

=== Interactive Practice ===
The Interactive Practice area allows visitors to test and use some of the tools on display. One component to this section is the "Illusion Room" where visitors can enter a maze of mirrors that create the illusion of walking on the ceiling, growing and shrinking in size.

=== Kids Land ===
Kids Land was built for young visitors. It includes a ball pit, climbing components and educational cartoons.

=== Leadership ===
Yakubov Mo'min Raximdjanovich

== See also ==
- State Museum of History of Uzbekistan
- The Museum of Health Care of Uzbekistan
- The Museum of Communication History in Uzbekistan
- Museum of Arts of Uzbekistan
- Tashkent Museum of Railway Techniques
- Museum of Geology, Tashkent
- Art Gallery of Uzbekistan
- The Alisher Navoi State Museum of Literature
- Museum of Victims of Political Repression in Tashkent
- State Museum of Nature of Uzbekistan
