= Tashkent Planetarium =

Planetarium in Uzbekistan

Coordinates: 41.3264°N 69.2422°E

- "Toshkent Planitariumi"
- Established: 7 November 2003
- Location: Tashkent, Uzbekistan
- Type: Public, technological planetarium

The Tashkent Planetarium is a planetarium in Tashkent, that provides visitors with the opportunity to look at outer space. Its goal is to distribute knowledge about the Solar System and the whole of space.

== About ==
Tashkent Planetarium was established by edict No.649 of "Cabinet of Ministers of Republic Uzbekistan" on 3 November 2003, by decision of Tashkent city municipality of 7 November 2003 No.748. The Planetarium is nowadays controlled by the controlling unit of Tashkent city municipality which focuses on culture and sport.

There are two main halls at the Planetarium, and each hall has its own functions. The first hall is mainly built for showing the Solar System and space, using Japanese technologies. The second hall contains artefacts, where visitors can learn more about specific planets and about Earth.

== See also ==
- State Museum of History of Uzbekistan
- The Museum of Health Care of Uzbekistan
- The Museum of Communication History in Uzbekistan
- Museum of Arts of Uzbekistan
- Tashkent Museum of Railway Techniques
- Museum of Geology, Tashkent
- Art Gallery of Uzbekistan
- The Alisher Navoi State Museum of Literature
- Museum of Victims of Political Repression in Tashkent
- State Museum of Nature of Uzbekistan
