= The Alisher Navoi State Museum of Literature =

- Alisher Navoiy nomidagi Davlat Adabiyot Muzeyi
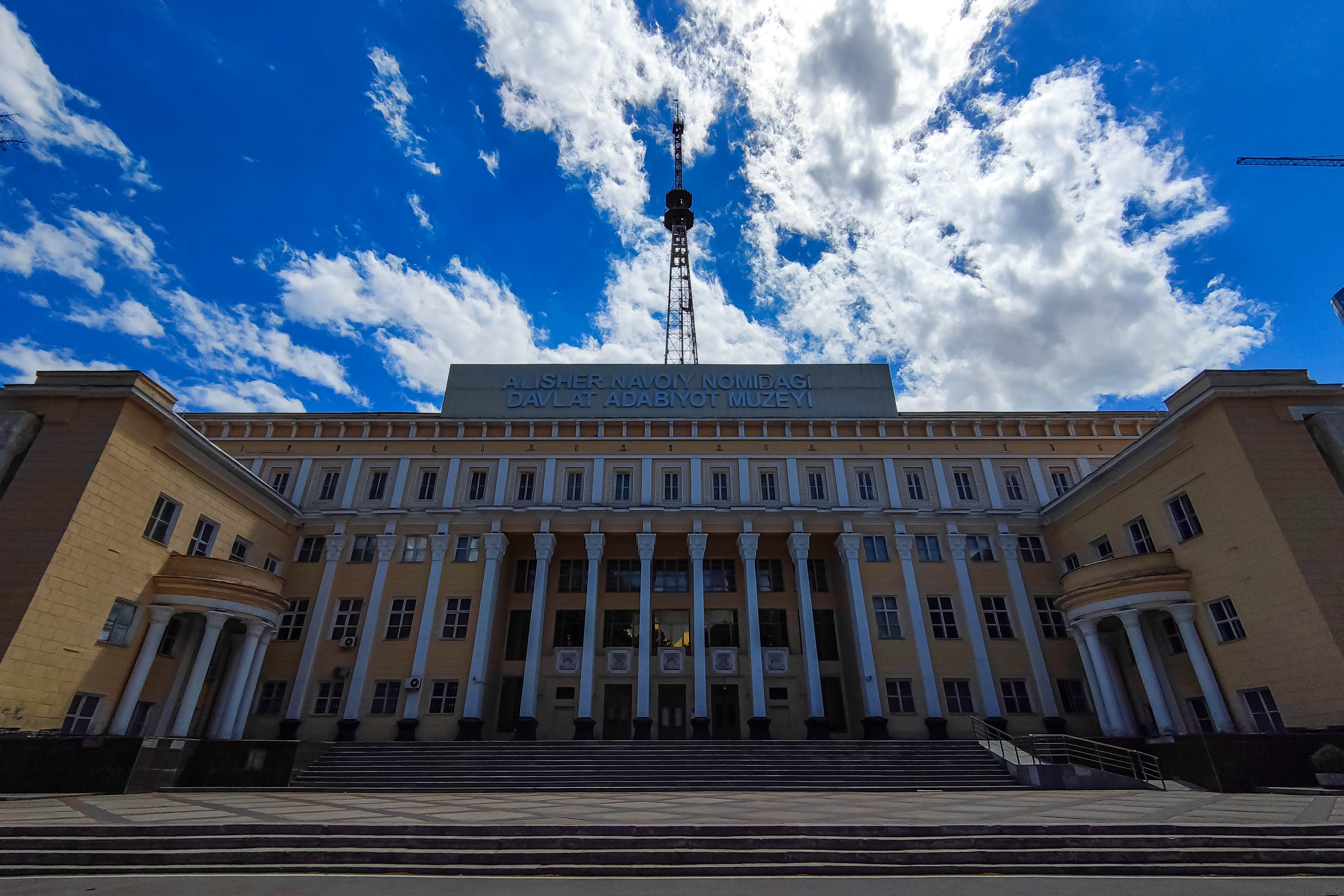
- Established: 1947
- Location: Tashkent, Uzbekistan
- Type: Museum of literature arts
- Director: Saidbek Khasananov

The Alisher Navoi State Museum of Literature of the Academy of Sciences of Uzbekistan is a scientific-cultural, educational establishment which mainly focuses on collecting and researching the historical materials and objects which are related to Uzbekistan's history. The museum plays a role in the cultural development of young generations in Uzbekistan and it keeps various documents, manuscripts from the Middle Ages.

== History ==
The Alisher Navoi State Museum of Literature was first established as the exhibition for the 500 year anniversary of Ali-Shir Nava'i. On the basis of this exhibition in 1947 the government opened the new Literature Museum.

From 1958 the Literature Museum was sent under the Language and Literature Institute, of Academy of Sciences of Uzbekistan. However, on 18 January 1967 the museum was set to be independent by the edict of the Uzbek government and was given a new 4 level building in Tashkent city. The first director of the museum was H. Sulaymonov. In 1976 the museum again became part of the bigger institution called the Handwritings Museum. On 13 September 1989 the museum was made independent for the second time by the Central committee of Uzbekistan and by the Department of Ministers of Uzbek Soviet Socialist Republic (UzSSR).

== After independence ==
After the independence of Republic Uzbekistan, The Alisher Navoi State Museum of Literature was given its current name and there are more than 17000 thousand art works, portraits, rare archaeological monuments, samples of national applied art. The Museum is a member of the International Council of Museums (ICOM).

Some departments at the museum hold research on the history of Uzbek literature. There is a fund of handwritings at the museum, including some unique handwritings. There are more than 65000 documents which are kept in the fund, and those documents cover the archives of 19th century Uzbekistan writers. The museum holds scientific literature. In addition to this, the museum promotes the rich literary heritage of the East.

These departments are currently open at the Alisher Navoi State Museum of Literature:

- Life and work study of AlisherNavoi
- Ancient period Uzbek literature
- Literature of the XVI-XX centuries
- Department of exposition
- Modern literature and folklore

== Staff ==
The director of the Alisher Navoi State Museum of Literature is Saidbek Khasananov. One academician, and three doctors of sciences, four candidates for the sciences and 50 employees currently work at the museum.

== Location ==
The Museum is located in Navoi street, Tashkent city, Uzbekistan, 100011.

== See also ==
- State Museum of History of Uzbekistan
- The Museum of Health Care of Uzbekistan
- Tashkent Museum of Railway Techniques
- Museum of Arts of Uzbekistan
- Museum of Victims of Political Repression in Tashkent
- State Museum of Nature of Uzbekistan
- Tashkent Poly-technical Museum
- The Museum of Communication History in Uzbekistan
- Art Gallery of Uzbekistan
- Geology Museum in Tashkent
- Tashkent Planetarium
