= Museum of Victims of Political Repression in Tashkent =

Memorial museum in Uzbekistan

- "Qatag'on Qurbonlari Xotira Muzeyi"
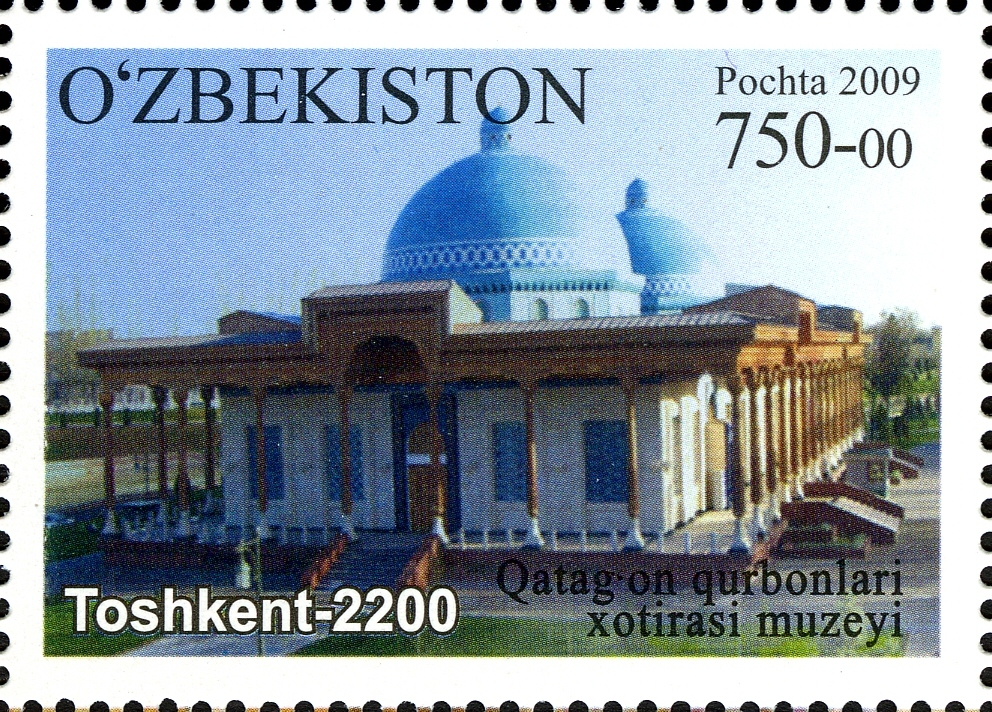
- Established: 2002.08.31
- Location: Tashkent, Uzbekistan
- Type: Public
- Founder: Islam Karimov

The Museum of Victims of Political Repression in Tashkent (Uzbek: Qatagʻon qurbonlari xotirasi muzeyi) is a museum which tells the history of Uzbekistan during the political repression in the Soviet Union, in particular that of the people killed at that time.

== Details ==
The museum is dedicated to the memory of the people who fought for the independence of Uzbekistan and who were killed by the government. The museum is one of the youngest museums in Uzbekistan as it was established on 31 August 2002, by President Islam Karimov. The Museum was first located in a very small park area in front of the Tashkent Tower. The museum has expanded rapidly, and has become part of a large memorial complex. The museum shows the legacy of controversial periods of Uzbekistan's history from the mid-19th century to the second half of the 20th century.

The museum's exhibits consist of photographs, documents and personal belongings of those killed. The repression started in 1860 when the Russian Empire waged a colonial war in Central Asia. The empire did not only destroy and conquer the cities, but they also killed a huge number of people. Instead of this, the exhibits describe the time of the Soviet Union, after the October Revolution; about Stalin's regime which was one of the bloodiest periods in the history of modern Uzbekistan; and about the more than 800 criminal cases under the "Cotton case" of the late 1980s. There are maquettes of the concentration camps and prisons where prisoners lived. The biggest stand at the Museum is the "Prison van", on which people were taken to the prison by the commissars.

The political and cultural elites of Uzbekistan do not follow the ethnic principle of studying archival materials on the repressed, but adhere to internationalism and territoriality. The very first publications about those repressed in Uzbekistan were devoted not only to Uzbeks but also to representatives of other ethnic groups, including Kazakhs.

== Objectives ==
The Museum of Victims of Political Repression in Tashkent's objectives for improvement are:

- Studying and learning tragic events of the colonial period
- Doing scientific research in public and private archives, in order to find the documents. Photographs and various artefacts related to the museum
- Studying lives and social activities of the victims
- Preparation and publication of literary and scientific contributions of the victims
- Arranging the spiritual and educational activities amongst young generations of Uzbekistan
- Preparation of calendars and posters about the victims

== Location ==
The museum is located in the territory of Shahidlar Xotirasi, which is translated from Uzbek as the "In Memory of Martyrs"). It is located in front of the Tashkent TV tower. The choice of location of the museum was reinforced by the fact that during construction a number of graves were found of people presumably killed during the Soviet period.

== Sources ==
- Hansen, Claus Bech. 'Power and purification: late-Stalinist repression in the Uzbek SSR'. Central Asian Survey 36, no. 1 (2017): 148-169.
- Malikov, Azim. 'Stalin’s Repressions and Rehabilitation of the Victims in the Politics of Memory in Uzbekistan'. Genocidas ir Rezistencija 2, no. 56 (2024): 163-181.
- The Legacies of Soviet Repression and Displacement (edited by Samira Saramo and Ulla Savolainen), Milton Park, Oxon: Taylor & Francis, 2023.

== See also ==
- State Museum of History of Uzbekistan
- The Museum of Health Care of Uzbekistan
- The Museum of Communication History in Uzbekistan
- Museum of Arts of Uzbekistan
- Tashkent Museum of Railway Techniques
- State Museum of Nature of Uzbekistan
- Tashkent Poly-technical Museum
- The Alisher Navoi State Museum of Literature
- Art Gallery of Uzbekistan
- Museum of Geology, Tashkent
- Tashkent Planetarium
- Museum of Political Repression Victims
