= Museum of Geology, Tashkent =

Geology museum in Tashkent, Uzbekistan

- "Toshkentdagi Geologiya Muzeyi"
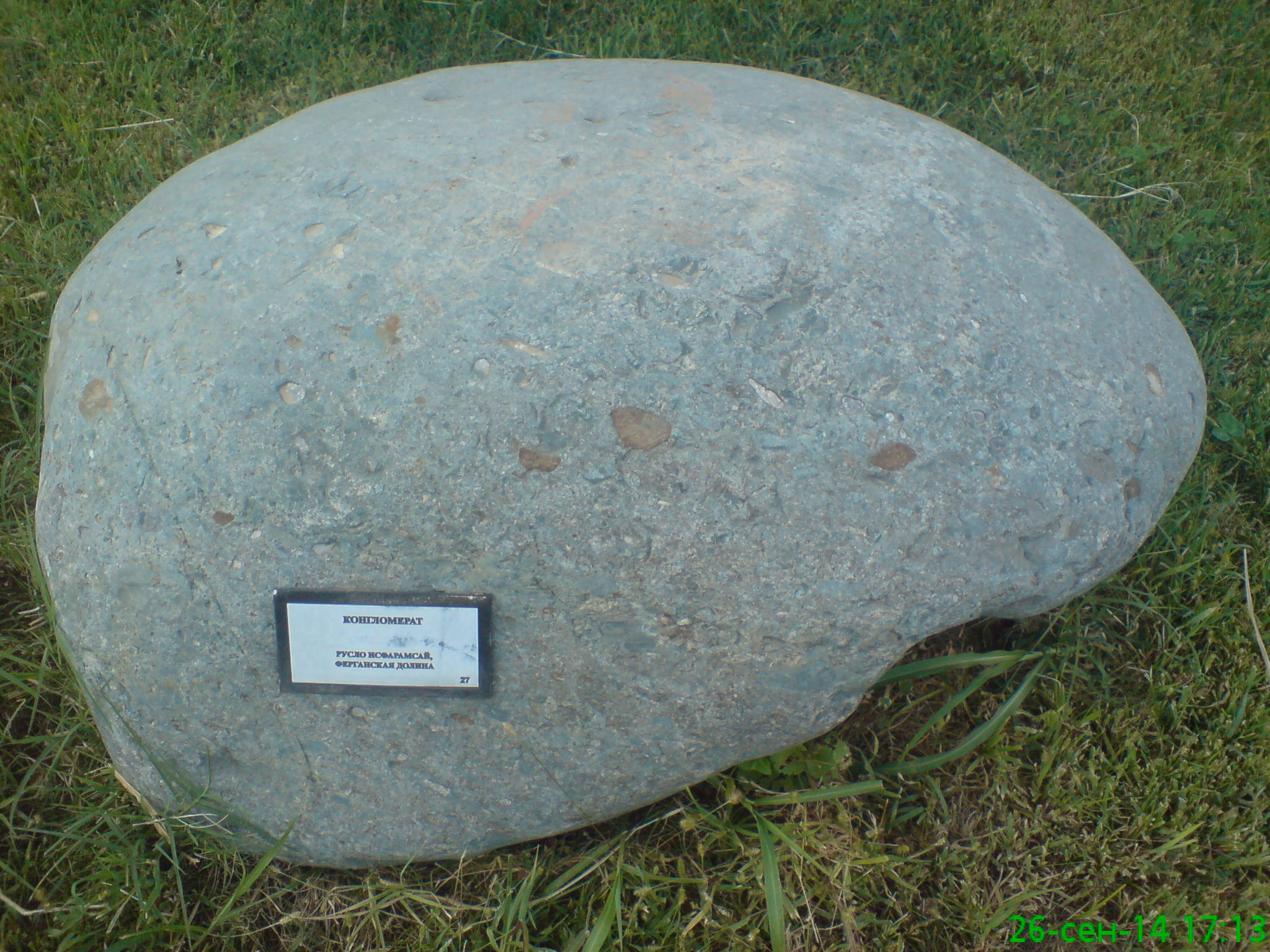
- Conglomerate from the riverbed of the Isfayramsoy river in the geological park of the museum.
- Established: 1988
- Location: Tashkent, Uzbekistan
- Coordinates: 41.3004°N 69.2785°E
- Type: Public, historical, geological
- Director: Turmuratov Ilxombay Bekchanovich

The Museum of Geology in Tashkent, Uzbekistan is a geology museum that shows and represents the wealth of mineral and geological resources in Uzbekistan, including valuable stones, minerals and archaeological and paleontological findings.

== Overview ==
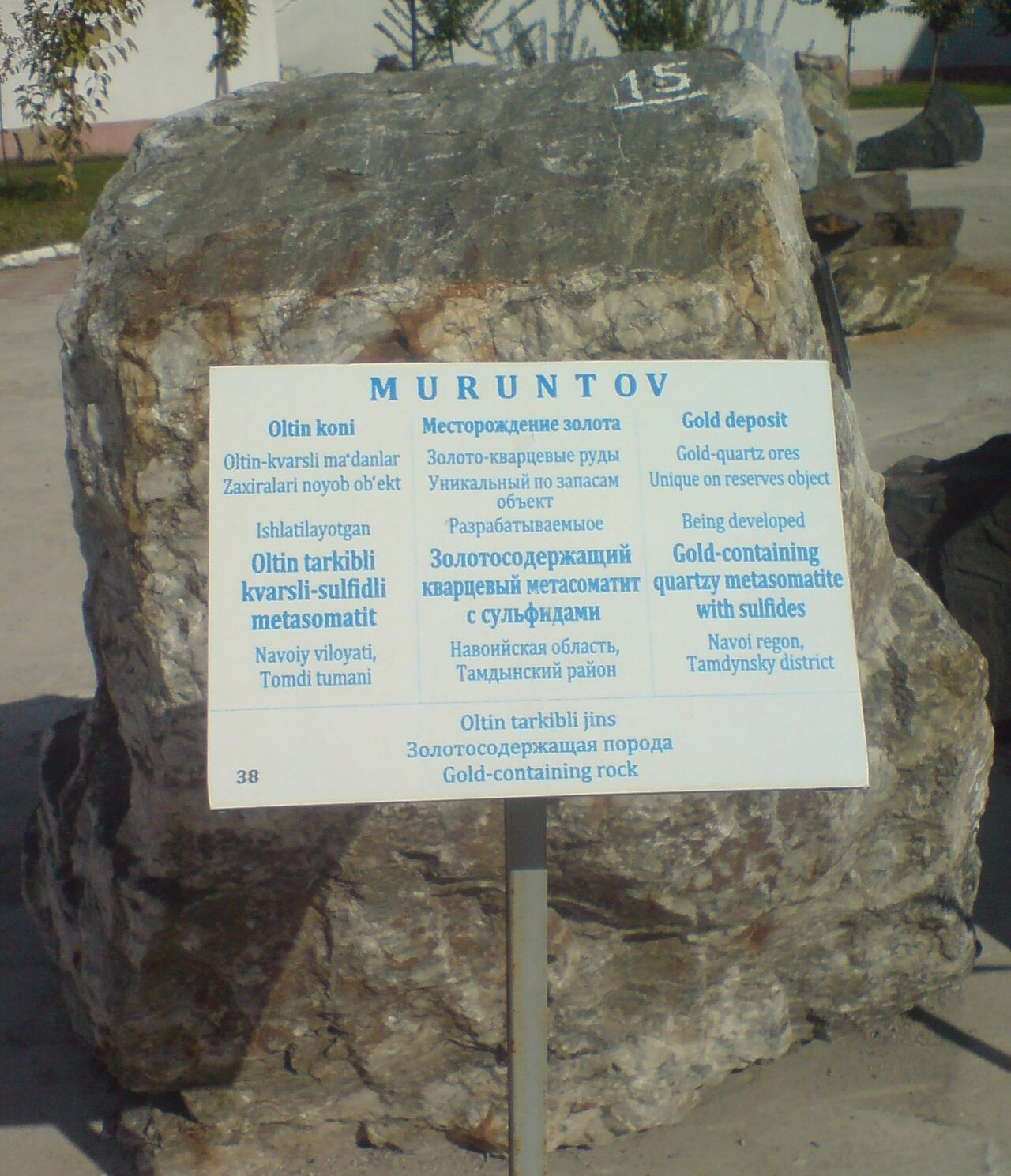
Gold-containing rock from Muruntau in the museum

The Museum of Geology was first established and opened to the public in 1988. However, the history of the museum covers about 75 years of operation of Uzbekistan geological service, which explored various areas of Uzbekistan. The total number of the stands and exhibits at the Museum of Geology is estimated to be more than 50 thousand pieces, but the visitors are shown only about half of the stands at the museum. The reason for this is that, the other exhibits are from ancient times and they need special supplements to stay on for a long time. The museum is mainly divided into two parts, which are the "Inner Hall" and the stands outside the building in a geological park. The museum has opened 12 halls inside the main building, and they present nine topics including mineralogy, geology, history of Uzbekistan, paleontology, ancient mining, geological studies of the Kitab Reserve and others.

During its existence, the Museum of Geology has had two buildings. The museum used its old building until April 2011, when the government of Uzbekistan gave new building to the Museum of Geology administration.

The halls of the museum are as follows:

- Introduction to the geology
- Ancient mountain artifacts
- Hall of “Kitab Reserve”
- Hall of vertebrates
- Main hall of mineralogy
- Hall of paleontology
- Two halls of minerals
- Monographic hall
- Regional hall
- Hall of petrography
- Expedition hall

== International agreements ==
The Museum of Geology cooperates with some companies of the world, in order to enlarge the base of the museum and fill the archive of the museum with many valuable findings. The corporations that are currently cooperating with the Museum of Geology are:

- Japanese National Company, from 8 July 2013
- JOGMEC corporation, from 25 October 2015
- Korea Institute of Geoscience and Mineral Resources, from 24 August 2011
- Mine Reclamation Corporation, from 8 September 2012
- Hanjin D&B, a Korean company, from 26 May 2015

== Head ==
Currently the head of the Museum of Geology in Tashkent is Turmuratov Ilxombay Bekchanovich.

== Location ==
The Museum of Geology is located at 11A T.Shevchenko Street, Mirabad district, Tashkent, Uzbekistan.

== See also ==
- State Museum of History of Uzbekistan
- The Museum of Health Care of Uzbekistan
- The Museum of Communication History in Uzbekistan
- Museum of Arts of Uzbekistan
- Tashkent Museum of Railway Techniques
- State Museum of Nature of Uzbekistan
- Tashkent Poly-technical Museum
- The Alisher Navoi State Museum of Literature
- Museum of Victims of Political Repression in Tashkent
- Art Gallery of Uzbekistan
- Tashkent Planetarium
