= The Museum of Health Care of Uzbekistan =

Coordinates: 41°18′7.9″N 69°17′16.9″E

- "Toshkent Sog'liqni Saqlash Muzeyi"
- Established: 1973
- Location: Tashkent, Uzbekistan
- Type: Public, health care museum

The Museum of Health Care of Uzbekistan is in Uzbekistan. It was established in order to contribute information about the medicine and hygiene among the Uzbek people in an interesting way.

== About ==
The Museum of Health Care of Uzbekistan was first established in 1973 for contributing health care information by professor Mikhail Yakovlevich Yarovinskiy, who was working in the Medical Academy of Moscow. The collection at The Museum is estimated to be about 12 thousand artefacts which are related to health care, house in 6 departments. Visitors can see the sculptures, documents which are related to modern medicine. In addition, there are artefacts which show facts from the history of medicine with photographs and archaeological findings. The most popular artefacts at the museum is the collection of surgery tools which were made by professionals who were inspired with the Ibn-Sina's historical writings. There are only five museums in this theme in post-Soviet Union Republics.

The walls at The Museum of Health Care of Uzbekistan are decorated in a Middle Ages eastern style, and there is a monument for the "Abu Ali Ibn Sina", who was one of the greatest medicine representatives of Uzbekistan. In the main parts of the building, the artefacts mainly concern the history of medicine and hygiene. Another big part of the building of The Museum is related to medical cleaning.

== Location ==
The Museum of Health Care of Uzbekistan is located in Istiklal Street Tashkent city, Uzbekistan.

== See also ==
- State Museum of History of Uzbekistan
- Tashkent Polytechnical Museum
- The Museum of Communication History in Uzbekistan
- Museum of Arts of Uzbekistan
- Tashkent Museum of Railway Techniques
- Museum of Geology, Tashkent
- Art Gallery of Uzbekistan
- The Alisher Navoi State Museum of Literature
- Museum of Victims of Political Repression in Tashkent
- State Museum of Nature of Uzbekistan
- Tashkent Planetarium
