= Sokh snakes =

Ancient sculpture found in Uzbekistan

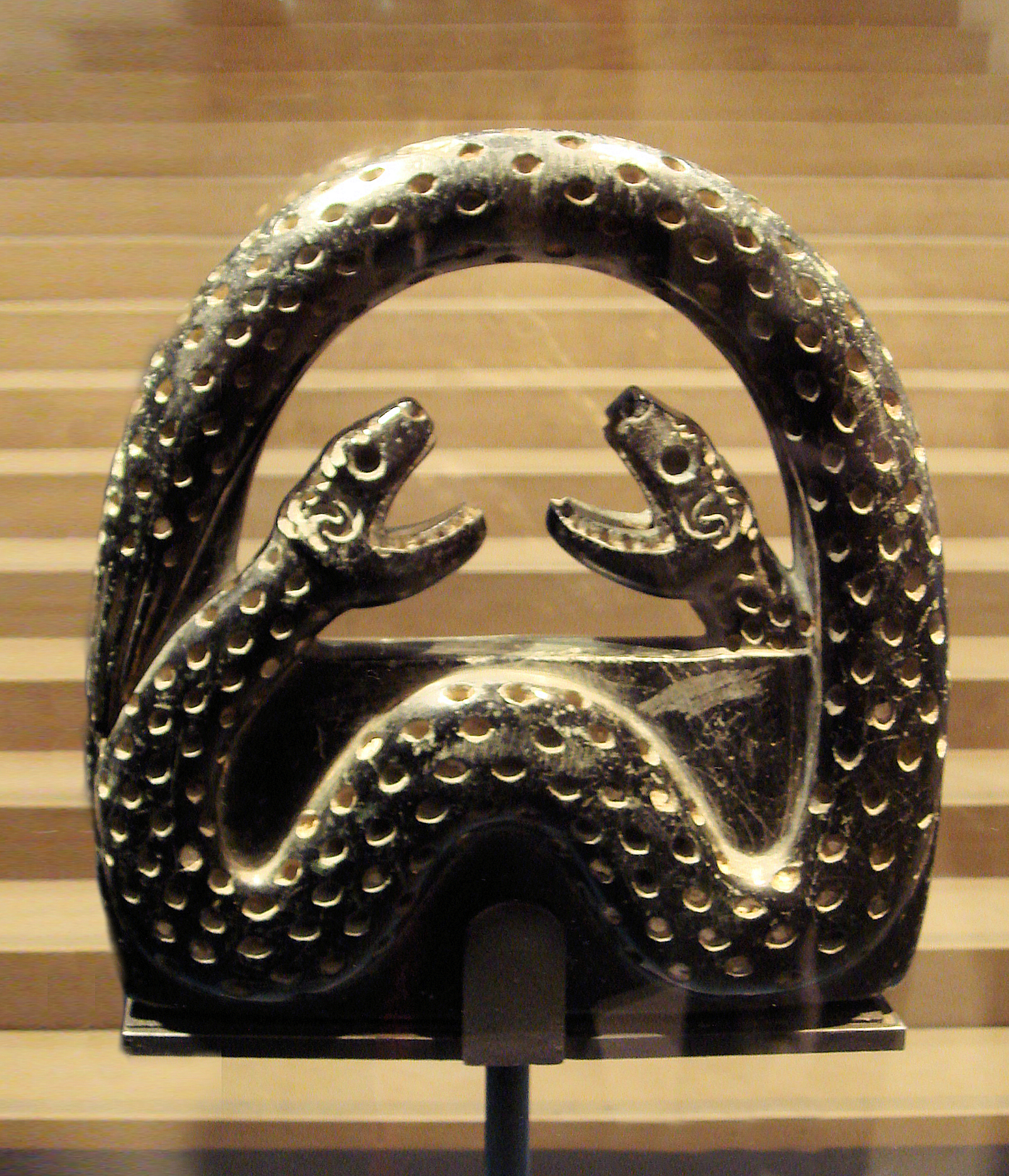
- Material: Stone
- Created: c. 2000 BC
- Discovered: 1899; Fergana, Uzbekistan
- Present location: National Museum of Uzbek History, Tashkent, Uzbekistan

The Sokh snakes are two snakes made in stone that were discovered in Sokh, Ferghana valley, Uzbekistan in 1899. It was created around 2000 BC, and displays stylistic similarities with the contemporary cultures of Mesopotamia. Leading archaeologist Philip Kohl suggests that it was actually imported from Elam, where similar objects can be found.

The culture to which the stone snakes belonged may have been a predecessor, and may have contributed to the formation, of the Chust culture (c. 1500 to 900 BC) of Fergana.

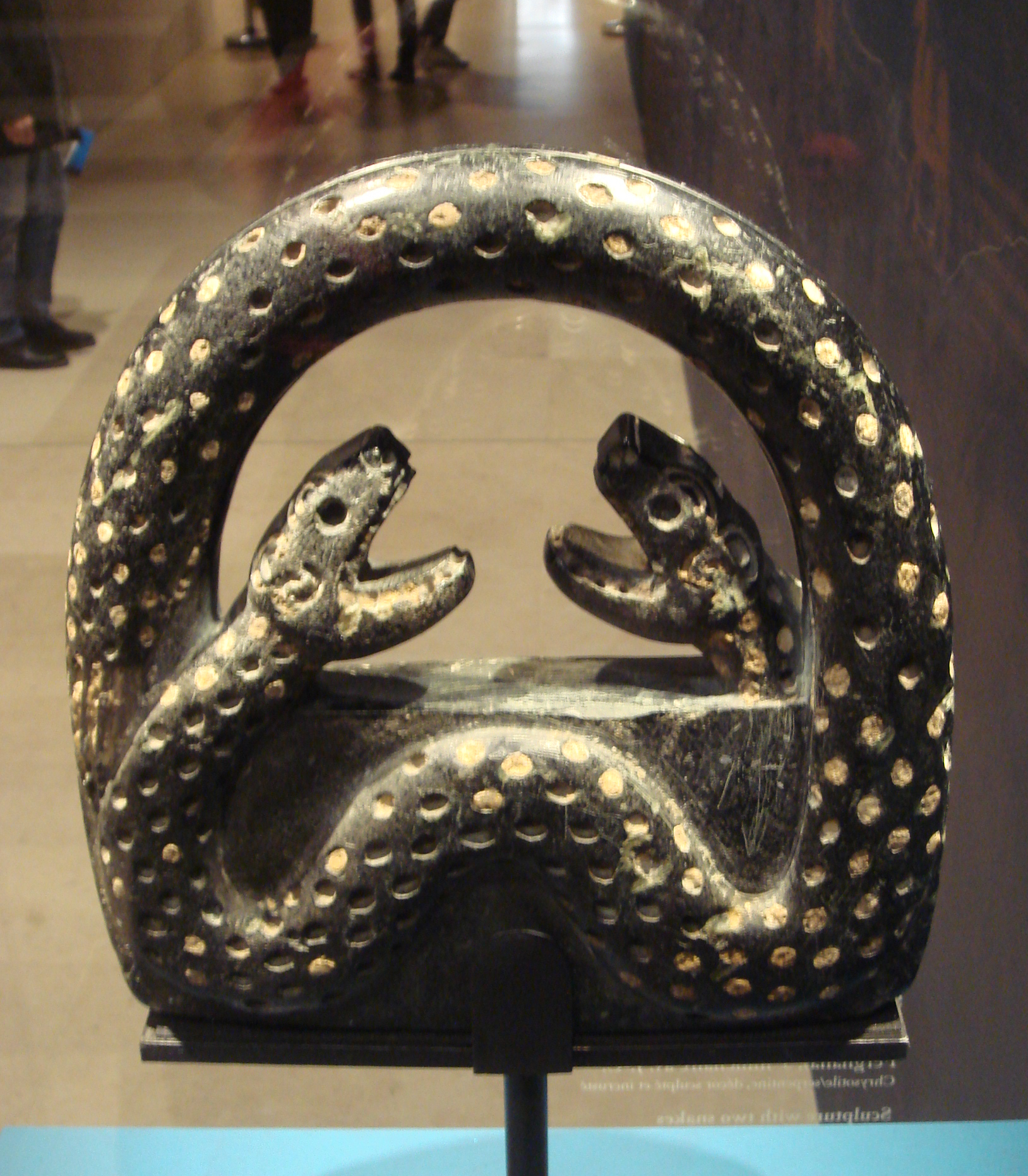
Back view
