= Museum of Political Repression Victims =

Museum in Baku, Azerbaijan

- Azerbaijani: Siyasi Repressiya Qurbanları Muzeyi
- Established: May 24, 2019
- Location: Baku

The Museum of Political Repression Victims is a museum in Baku, Azerbaijan. It is located in the building where the branches of the main repressive bodies of the Soviet state, namely the Emergency Commission, the People's Commissariat for Internal Affairs and Committee for State Security were located. There were detention cells in the basement of the building, questioning rooms, and places where inmates were shot who sentenced for death

The museum's exposition tells about the saddest years of Azerbaijan's history, the repressive policy of the USSR in 1920–1950, which resulted in the political repression of hundred of thousands of public figures and statesmen, delegates of art, culture, science and ordinary citizens.

== Description ==
The museum was established on May 24, 2019, in the administrative building of the State Border Service as part of the events dedicated to the 100th anniversary of the Border Guard of Azerbaijan. After 1925, the main repressive organs of the state functioned in this building. In the basement of the building, there were cells for detainees, interrogation rooms, and places where death row inmates were shot.

The museum's exposition mainly consists of Political Documents of the Office of the President of the Republic of Azerbaijan, documents and photographs kept in the State and Film-Photo archives of the National Archive Department of Azerbaijan and the State Security Service, as well as compositions by local artists. Some documents were obtained from Russian archives. There are also some documents were submitted by the “A.L.J.I.R” Museum of Political Repression. The Ministry of Culture and the Institute of History named after Abbasgulu Bakikhanov of the Azerbaijan National Academy of Sciences also assisted in the preparation of the museum's exposition. A board called "Speaking Documents" contains copies of documents adopted in 1920–1930 in connection with the repression in the main hall of the museum.

The boards which are in the main hall of the museum are dedicated to the repressed Azerbaijani soldiers, military officers, the wives of the "traitors" exiled to the labor camps, the republican students and intellectuals who were victims of repression. Copies of acts and documents which are about shootings of poet Mikayil Mushfig, pedagogue Tagi Shahbazi, actor Abbas Mirza Sharifzadeh and others are displayed on another board. In order to give visitors an idea about Bolshevik behaviour to political prisoners during the years of repression, the museum's detention cells, solitary confinement, interrogation and shooting rooms were restored through historical reconstruction. There are also compositions in the corridors which is symbolizing the protest against illegal arrest and freedom. The compositions "Whirlwind of Repression" and "In the Light of Hope" symbolically express the suffering and hardships of azerbaijanians who lived in prison and were expelled from their homeland.

== See also ==
- Museum of Victims of Political Repression in Tashkent
