= Aleksandr Nikolayev (painter) =

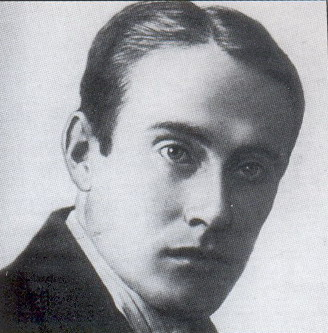
- Aleksandr Nikolayev (Usto Mumin)
- Born: Aleksandr Vasilievich Nikolayev; 30 August 1897; Voronezh, Russian Empire
- Died: 27 June 1957 (aged 59); Tashkent, Uzbek SSR
- Known for: Painting
- Movement: Soviet avant-garde

Aleksandr Vasilievich Nikolayev (Russian: Алекса́ндр Васи́льевич Никола́ев; 30 August 1897 – 27 June 1957), also known as Usto Mumin (Russian: Усто́ Муми́н), was a Soviet painter of Russian origin, who lived and worked in the Uzbek SSR.

== Biography ==
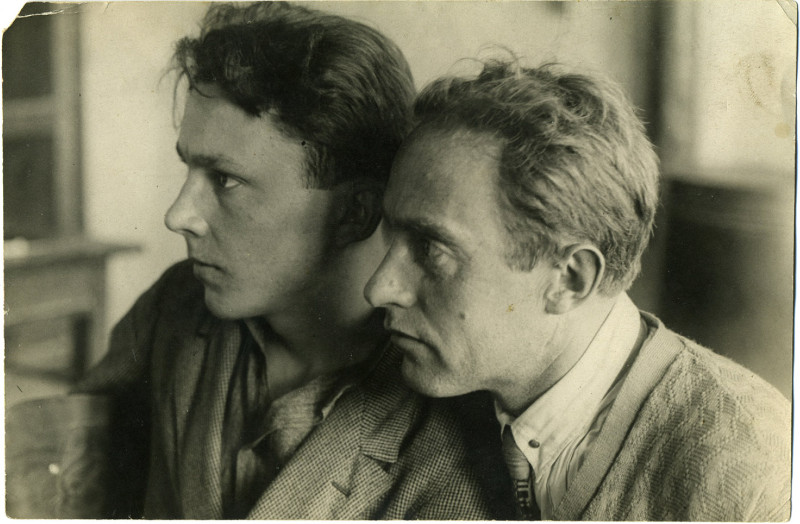
Aleksandr Nikolayev (Usto Mumin) (right) with an unknown man

=== Early years ===
Alexander Nikolayev was born in Voronezh in 1897. His father was a military engineer, who traveled extensively around Russian Empire, taking the family with him, before settling permanently in Voronezh in 1914. Nikolayev studied in the Sumsk Military School from 1908 till 1916. There he met his first painting teacher Nikolay Evlampiev. After military school he served in Imperial Russian Army in 1916–1917. After army studied in Uhlan School in Tver till 1918, when he started to attend the art studio of Alexander Buchkuri in Voronezh. He began to study in the Second State Free Art Studio in Moscow in 1919 under Kazimir Malevich. Shortly after the beginning of his studies he was drafted to Red Army and sent to the front.

=== Central Asia ===
Nikolayev was sent to Tashkent after demobilization in 1920. His mission was to develop art and culture in new Soviet Central Asia and work closely with Turkestan Central Executive Committee. He moved to Samarkand in spring 1921.

I am going revolutionize art [...] as a Bolshevik artist.

— Usto Mumin, The quote was located by professor Eleonora Shafranskaya, Manuscript diary of Olga Bessarabova (Marina Tsvetaeva house-museum, INV. NO. КП-4677/55)

Nikolayev fell in love with Central Asia. The local culture and traditions started to influence and inspire his life and art. Nikolayev became a member of the circle of artists around Daniil Stepanov (1921– 1924). The group shared a common interest in Italy, specifically the Quattrocento. According to Nikolaev's own confessions, expressed by him repeatedly during the 1930s, he converted to Islam in 1922. He received a new name from his pupils - Usto Mumin, which means "Faithful and Gentle Master". In 1925, Usto Mumin moved back to Tashkent. He moved to Leningrad in 1929 and a year later, in 1930 returned to Uzbekistan.

=== Arrest and imprisonment ===
He was working as a director of Uzbek Pavilion at Union Agricultural Exhibition in Moscow, when he was unexpectedly arrested and imprisoned. One of the reasons for his arrest was his homosexuality. Many of his works, painted in his early Uzbek period had homoerotic themes and used Bacha bazi as a subject. One of his most well-known paintings "Pomegranate Zeal", which is in the iconographic tradition, tells the story of two young boys from the moment they meet until their death. He spent four years in prison and was released in 1942. He was not allowed to paint while in prison.

=== Later years ===
After release, Nikolaev returned to Uzbekistan and continued to work as illustrator and theatre designer. He received an Honorary Award from the Central Executive Committee of the Uzbek Soviet Socialist Republic for his role in establishing the Uighur Theatre in Tashkent. Nikolayev died in Tashkent in 1957.

== Exhibitions and collections ==
Usto Mumin's works are in collections of museums in post-Soviet countries, including the State Museum of Oriental Art in Moscow, the Nukus Museum of Art and the Museum of Arts of Uzbekistan. He exhibited throughout the USSR during his lifetime, including the exhibition "Old Samarkand" in Samarkand in 1924, the Jubilee Exhibition of Soviet Art in Moscow in 1927 and several exhibitions in Tashkent. The Tretyakov Gallery exhibited works of Usto Mumin in 2010 as part of its Russian Orientalist paintings exhibition.

=== Notable exhibitions ===
- 1935. "Exhibition of Six". Curated by Fedor Shmit. Museum of Arts of Uzbekistan, Tashkent
- 2006. "Ecstasy of Usto Mumin". Ilkhom Theatre gallery. Tashkent
- 2013. "Echo of Vanguard". Ilkhom Theatre gallery. Tashkent
- 2017. "Retrospective of XX century Uzbek art". Uzbekistan Academy of Arts. Tashkent

== In modern culture ==
Tashkent theatre Ilkhom created a project "Pomegranate Zeal" after Usto Mumin. It is a play combined with an exhibition of Usto Mumin's paintings.
