= Daniil Stepanov =

Russian artist (1881–1937)

- Born: Daniil Klavdievich Stepanov; 18 August 1881; Moscow, Russian Empire
- Died: 9 March 1937 (aged 55); Venice, Kingdom of Italy
- Known for: Painting

Daniil Klavdievich Stepanov (August 18, 1881, Russian Empire, Moscow – March 9, 1937, Italy, Venice) was a painter, restorer, set designer and medalist, and author of the first Soviet circulation medal in honour of the second anniversary of the October Revolution.

== Biography ==
=== Early life ===
Son of academician Klavdiy Petrovich Stepanov (1854-1910). He was the brother of restoration artist Pyotr Stepanov. After 1894, he travelled around Europe, lived in Paris, studied at the Sorbonne, and took lessons from French medalists. In 1902, he married Roma Travaglino in Rome.

In 1902, he returned with his family to Moscow, where he helped his father restore the Kremlin. From 1913, he became the chief medalist of the Imperial Mint in St. Petersburg.

For the 1st anniversary of the revolution, he performed the festive decor of the Chernyshev Bridge, and for the second anniversary, he performed the first Soviet circulation medal.

=== After revolution ===
From 1919 to 1924, he served as deputy chairman of the Department for Museum Affairs in Petrograd. The Cheka arrested him on charges of anti-Soviet activities.

Having been released thanks to the petition of Lunacharsky, he went to Penza, where he taught at the Art School. In 1920, he joined the Commission for the Preservation of Monuments of Samarkand, travelled to Turkestan, and was engaged in sketches and photography of ethnographic material. Together with Alexey Isupov, Alexander Volkov and Alexander Nikolaev (Usto Mumin), he influenced the formation of a distinctive art school in Turkestan.

In 1924, he became a medalist at the Petrograd Mint. In 1925 he went on a business trip to the mints in Paris and Rome to familiarize himself with new copying and engraving equipment. He did not return to Russia.

=== In immigration ===
He taught for some time in Paris, one of his students was B. F. Chaliapin. At the end of 1925 he moved to Rome, studied at the Roman Academy of Arts, specializing in the restoration of works of the Renaissance, and was involved in the restoration of paintings by Raphael, Titian, Piero della Francesca and Andrea Mantegna. He executed several commissioned works In Umbria, in particular, the triptych "Holy Family" for the right wing of the main altar of the church of Sant'Andrea in Orvieto and the decoration of the main entrance of the Villa delle Grazie in Narni on the subject of the Annunciation.

In 1926, he participated in the XV International Biennale in Venice with paintings painted in Turkestan. He exhibited three works in the section dedicated to international art (Suzani Seller, Fruit Seller, Head). The paintings, created during his stay in Turkestan in 1921 and 1924, were praised by critics and the Italian public for their exotic character. Critic Arturo Lancellotti described Stepanov as “an excellent colorist with a very individual style”.

In June 1927, he held a personal exhibition in the hall of the Palazzo del Augusteo in Rome (a personal exhibition of A.V. Isupov took place in the next hall).

In the last years of his life, he worked on theatrical scenery and worked closely with Nikolai Benois.

== Сollections ==
- Hermitage Museum, Sankt Peterburg, Russia
