= Andrei Belloli =

Russian painter (1820–1881)

Andrea Bellolli Andrei Frantsevich Belloli
- Born: 1820; Ronciglione, Papal State
- Died: 1881 (aged 60–61); Rome, Kingdom of Italy
- Education: Accademia di San Luca
- Known for: Portrait painting
- Elected: Member Academy of Arts (1861)

Andrea Belloli, russified as Andrei Frantsevich Belloli (Russian: Андрей Францевич Беллоли; December 3, 1820 — July 9, 1881) was an Italian painter, notably active in St. Petersburg during Tsar Alexander II's reign; known primarily for his portraits and female nudes.

== Biography ==
He studied art at the Accademia di San Luca. During the Revolutions of 1848, he left Italy. In 1850, he settled in Saint Petersburg and initially worked as a decorative painter for churches and palaces; creating everything from small door decorations to plafonds. Later he began to do portraits; mostly of women and children, in oils and colored pencils.

He participated regularly in exhibitions and, in 1861, was named an "Academician" for portrait painting by the Imperial Academy of Arts. In 1869, he organized an exhibition and sale, with the proceeds to benefit poor students and the widows and orphans of artists.

In 1870, for his fiftieth birthday, he was awarded the Order of St. Stanislaus. That same year, he donated one of his best-known works "After the Bath" to the Academy's museum. He created several variations on this theme, one of which ("The Bather") was purchased by Grand Duke Nikolai Konstantinovich. It is now at the Museum of Arts of Uzbekistan in Tashkent, where the Grand Duke died.

Although his paintings were popular with the public, they generally received poor critical notices. In 1877, Vsevolod Garshin dismissed them as "nice, pretty ladies" with no emotional content.

For many years, he continued to be involved in activities that benefitted Russian art and artists but, for unknown reasons, he committed suicide in 1881.

== Works ==
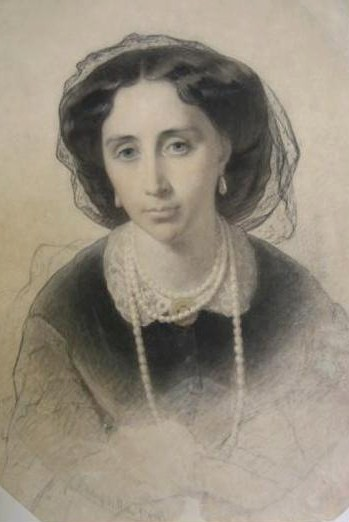
Alexandra Apraksina (Pashkova) (1863)

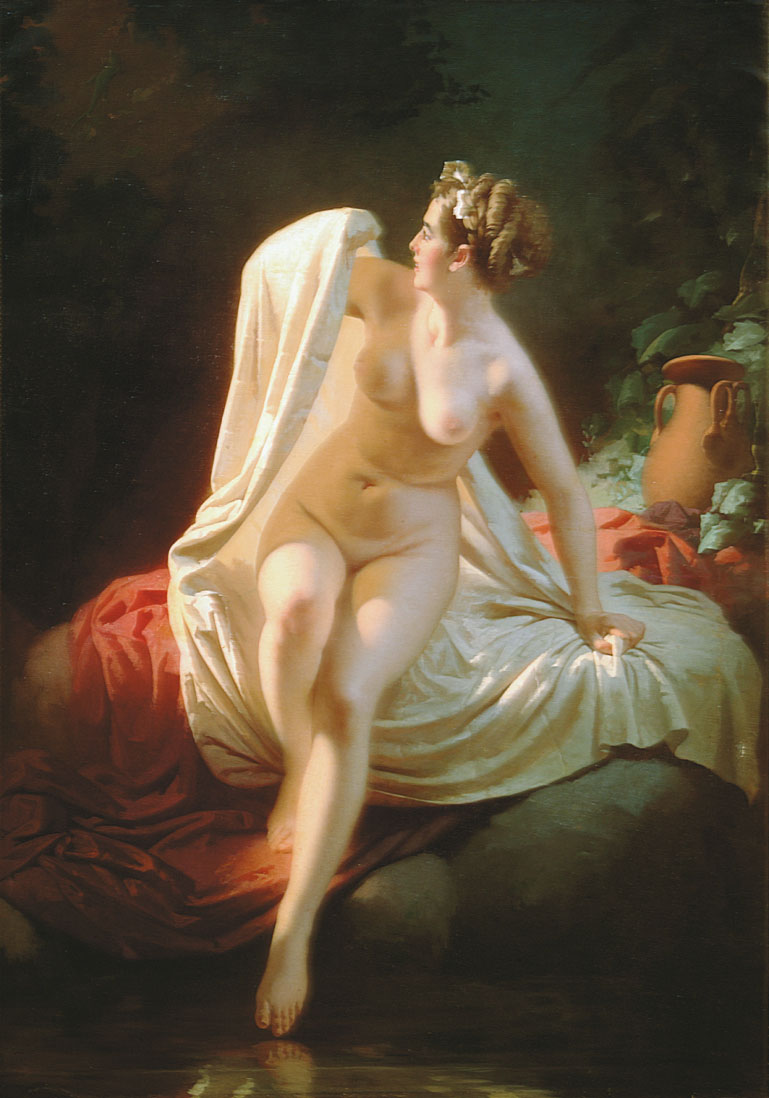
The Bather (1871)

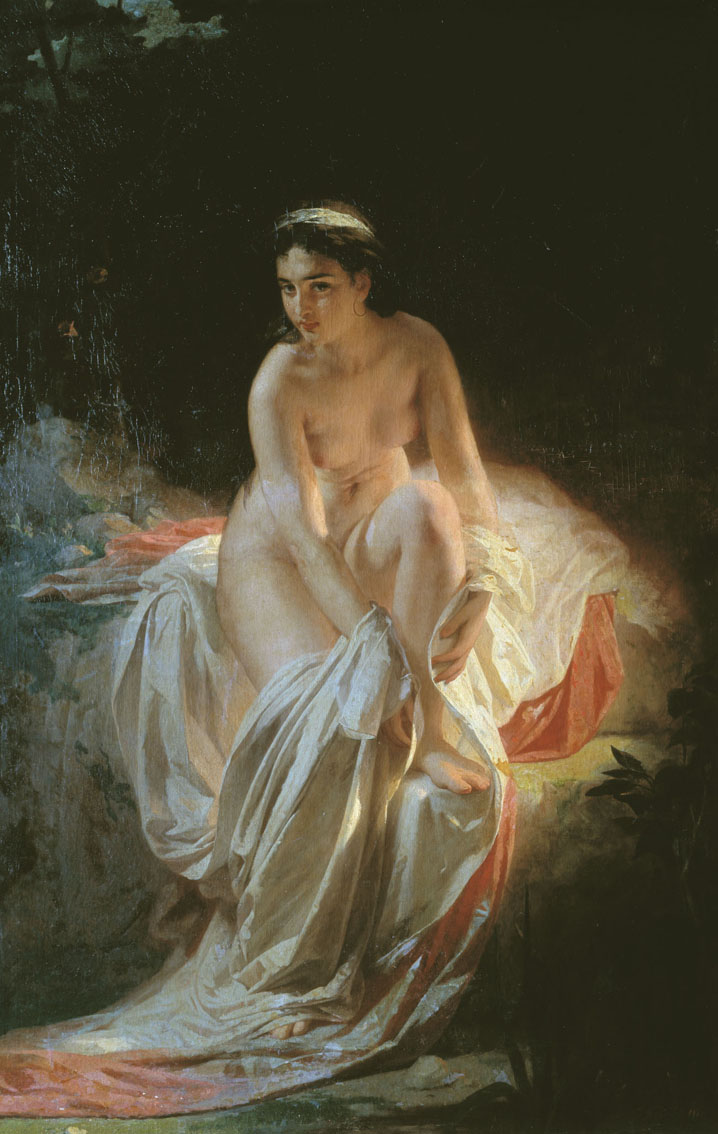
Bather after the bath (1875)

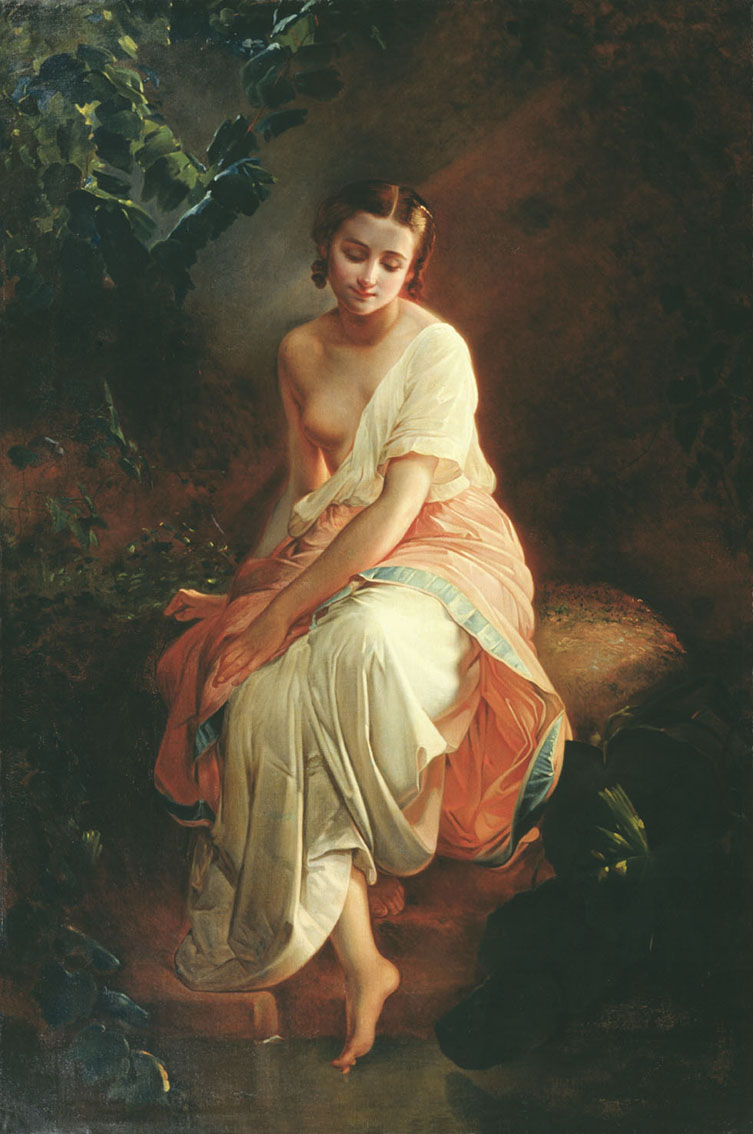
Bather
(alternate version)

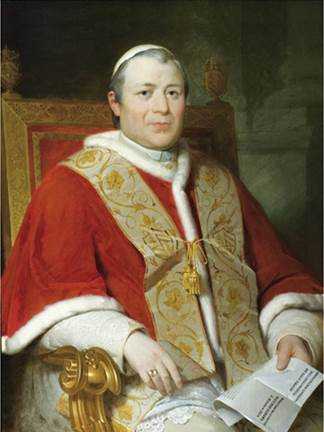
Pope Pius IX (about 1878)

== Bibliography ==
- Bogoslovsky, Vitaly A. (1970). "Belloli, Andrea". Dizionario Biografico degli Italiani (in Italian). Vol. 7. Rome: Istituto della Enciclopedia italiana.
- Bulgakov, Fyodor I. [in Russian] (1889–1890). "Беллоли, Андрей Францович". Наши художники (in Russian). St. Petersburg: Suvorin Typography. vol. 1, p. 34; vol. 2, p. 284. OCLC 38661216.
- Kondakov, Sergei N. [in Russian] (1915). Юбилейный справочник Императорской Академии художеств. 1764–1914 [Directory of the Imperial Academy of Arts] (in Russian). Vol. 2. Saint Petersburg: Golike and Vilborg. p. 15. OCLC 707072219.
- Petrov, Pyotr N. (1866). Сборник материалов для истории Императорской Санкт-Петербургской академии художеств за сто лет ее существования (in Russian). Vol. 3. Saint Petersburg: Gogenfelden and Co. pp. 383, 433, 448. OCLC 676719786.
- Voltsenburg, Oskar E. [in Russian]; et al., eds. (1970). "Беллоли, Андрей Францевич". Художники народов СССР (in Russian). Vol. 1. Moscow: Iskusstvo. p. 338.
