= Paul Louis Bouchard =

French painter (1853–1937)

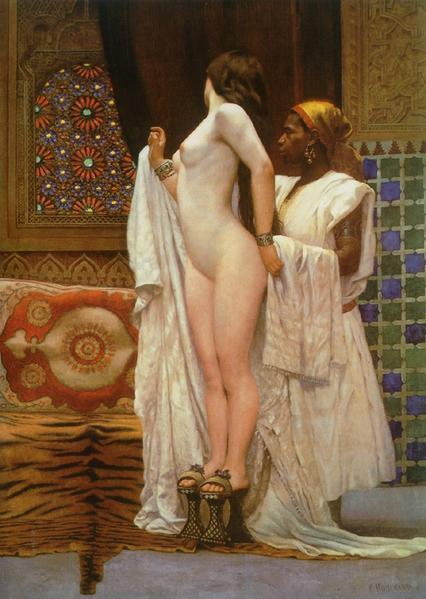
After the Bath

Paul Antoine Louis Bouchard (5 August 1853, Paris – 1937, Paris) was a French painter; best known for his Orientalist scenes.

== Biography ==
He was a student of Gustave Boulanger, Jules Lefebvre and Fernand Cormon. At the beginning of his career, he produced historical scenes; primarily from the Middle Ages. He later broadened his themes to include Orientalist scenes and Russian cityscapes.

His exhibitions at the Salon began in 1880, and he would continue to have showings there annually until 1930. He was awarded a bronze medal at the Exposition Universelle of 1900.

He was named a Knight of the Legion of Honor in 1908.

His painting The Almahs was used on the back cover of the revue Grand écrivain in 1987 to illustrate an article about Arthur de Gobineau and his dreamlike view of the Middle East. The original is at the Musée d'Orsay.
