= Pietro Lazzarini =

Italian sculptor (1842–1918)

Pietro Lazzarini (5 January 1842 – 1918) was an Italian sculptor.

== Biography ==
He descended from a family of sculptors who ran a marble workshop in Carrara from 1670 until 1942. The sculptor Giuseppe Lazzarini was his brother. He submitted a bas relief of Evander retrieves the body of Pallas for a competition, and was awarded a stipend by the government to study at the Academy of Fine Arts of Florence. He returned to work to Carrara.

Among his first mature works are the Martyrdom of four saints, found in the main altar of the Lombard church of Carrara. This he followed it with Leda and Bacchus donated to the Academy of Carrara. Then he sculpted After the Bath, a nude female statua exhibited at the Accademia Fiorentina, where it was awarded a gold medal.

He sculpted a bas-relief medallion of princess della Cisterna. For the Soldiers' National Monument in Gettysburg, Pennsylvania, USA he helped design the five larger than life statues of History, War, Abundance, Industry, and Victory that are around the base of a tall granite column.

In 1869, he moved to Berlin, where he excelled in portraiture. In 1881 at the Exhibition of Milan, he exhibited The Pastime. In Paris, he exhibited The Innocence.

One of his notable work was a marble rood screen (c. 1899) in the Cathedral of St. Patrick, in Armagh.

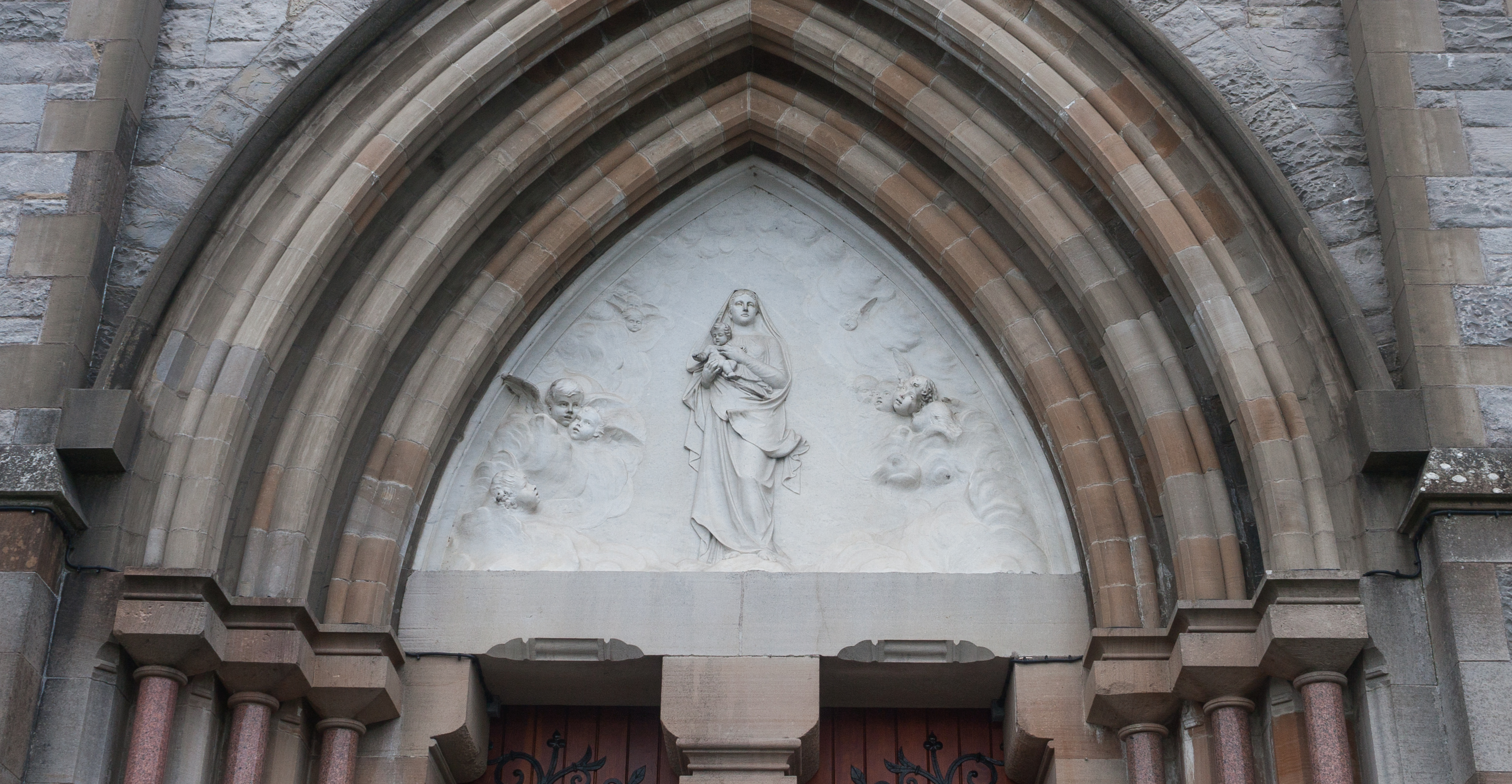
Tympanum of Madonna and child at St Macartan's Cathedral, Monaghan

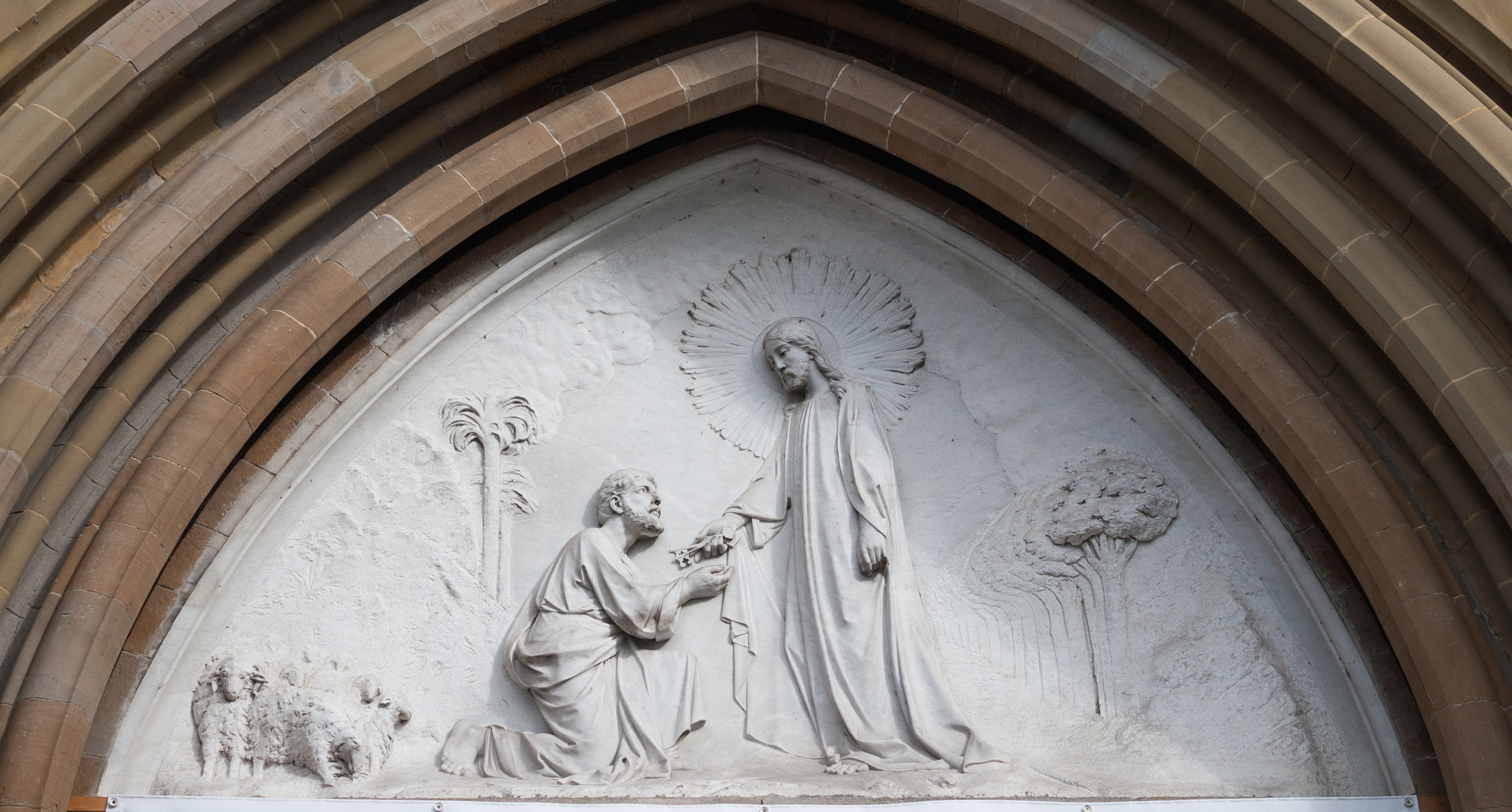
Tympanum of Christ giving the keys at St Macartan's Cathedral, Monaghan

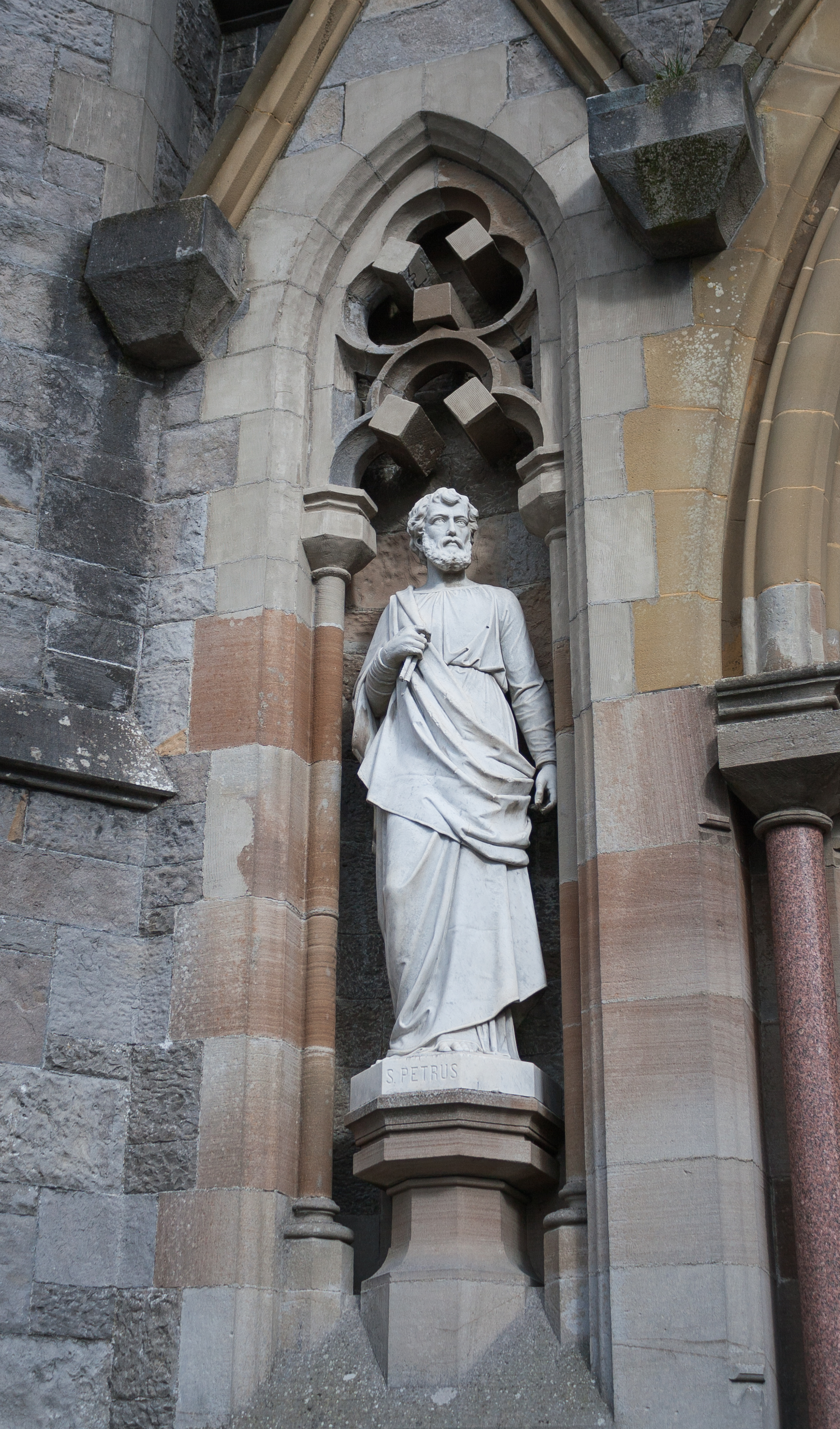
Statue of Saint Peter at St Macartan's Cathedral, Monaghan

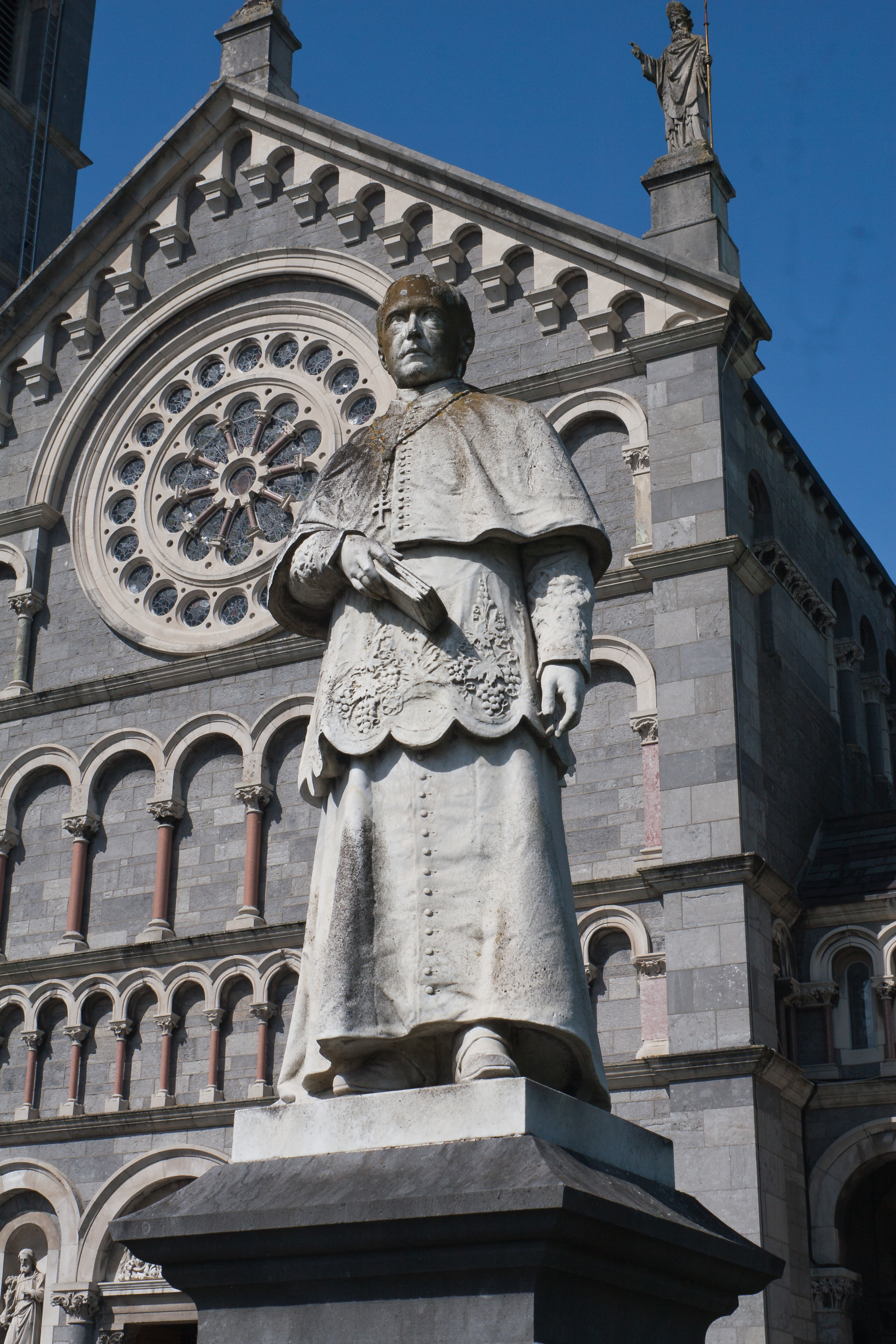
Statue of archbishop Patrick Leahy in front of Thurles Cathedral, erected in 1911
