= Museum of Arts of Uzbekistan =

Art museum in Tashkent, Uzbekistan

Coordinates: 41.3028°N 69.2778°E

- Location: 16, Amir Temur Avenue, Tashkent, Republic of Uzbekistan, 100060
- Type: Art museum, Russian art, Ukrainian art, Uzbek art, Western art
- Director: Fayziyeva Vasila
- Website: www.stateartmuseum.uz

UNESCO World Heritage Site
- Official name: State Museum of Arts (State Museum of Arts)
- Part of: Tashkent Modernist Architecture. Modernity and Tradition in Central Asia
- Criteria: Cultural: iv
- Reference: 1766
- Inscription: 2026 (48th Session)

The Museum of Arts of Uzbekistan (Uzbek: Oʻzbekiston Davlat Sanʼat muzeyi; Russian: Музей искусств Узбекистана) is the largest national art museum in Tashkent, Republic of Uzbekistan. Its permanent collection contains more than several thousands works, divided among four curatorial departments. The museum was established in 1918 as a "Museum of People University" and renamed as the "Central Arts Museum" later. It was named as the "Tashkent Art Museum" in 1924 and finally the "Museum of Arts of Uzbekistan" in 1935.

== History ==
The museum was established in 1918 and was located in former palace of Grand Duke Nicholas Konstantinovich of Russia, a grandson of Tsar Nicholas I of Russia, until 1935. It was moved to the People's House in 1935. In 1974, the People's House building was demolished and replaced by the current building.

== Building ==
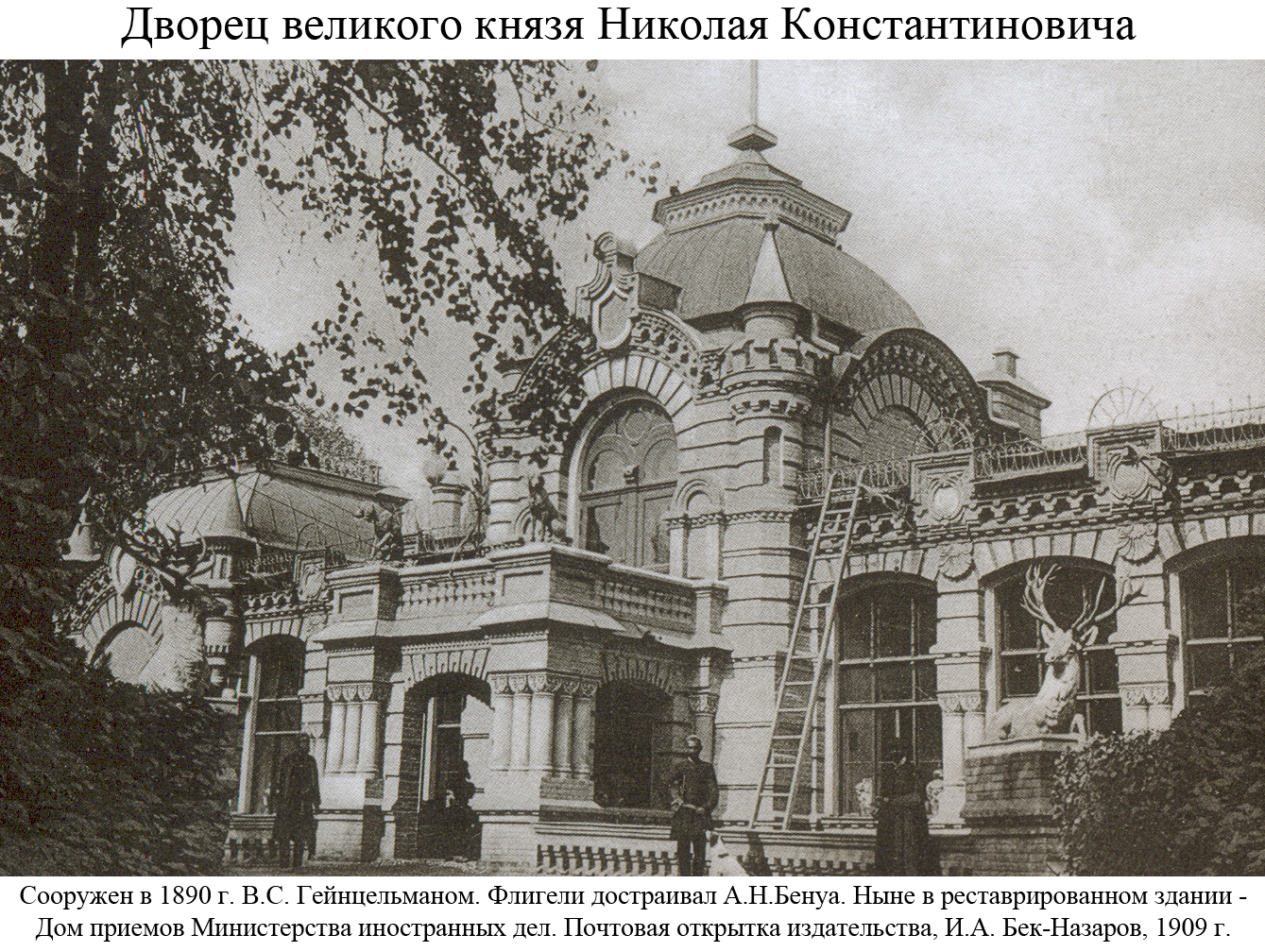
Tashkent. Museum of Arts of Uzbekistan till 1935.

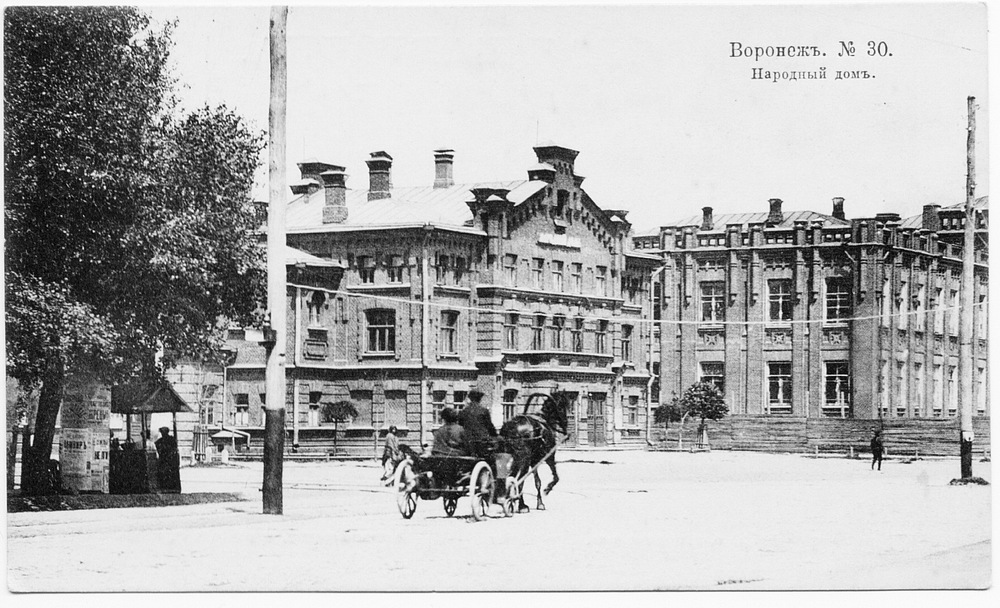
Tashkent. Museum of Arts of Uzbekistan till 1966.

Tashkent. Museum of Arts of Uzbekistan today

Three Soviet architects, I Abdulov, A.K. Nikiforov, and S. A. Rosenblum designed the new building to replace the previous museum on the site of the People's University which was a destroyed during the 1966 Tashkent earthquake. Planned in the form of a huge cube, the sides are divided into rectangles which are separated by metal frames, and lined with aluminum sheets on the outside. The lower part of the building and the entrance are decorated with polished gray marble. The upper part is glazed with chrom-brugnatellite, smoothing the sunlight and setting indoor matte illumination. The building was completed in 1974 and renovated in 1997.

In July 2026, the Museum of Arts, along with nine other modernist sites in Tashkent, was designated by UNESCO as a World Heritage Site.

== Collection ==
The initial collection of the museum consisted of a hundred works of art from Grand Duke Nicholas Konstantinovich of Russia and other private collections, nationalized in April 1918. Those were mostly paintings and drawings by Russian and Western European masters, sculptures, furniture, and porcelain. Immediately after establishing the museum, its collection was enlarged with works from the collection of the Turkestan local history museum.

Some works were transferred from museum collections in Moscow and Leningrad—for example, in 1920–1924 the museum received 116 works of Ukrainian and Russian artists from the 18th to 20th centuries, among them portraits by Vladimir Borovikovsky, Karl Bryullov, Ilya Repin, Vasily Tropinin, Nikolai Yaroshenko, and many others. The museum also purchased about 250 paintings of pre-revolutionary Russian and non-Russian artists who were active in Central Asia: Igor Kazakov, Nikolay Karazin, and William Sommer. From the second half of the 1930s, the museum's collection was expanded mostly with works by Uzbek artists, including works of Usto Mumin, Pavel Benkov, and Leo Bure.

In addition to its permanent collection, the museum holds exhibitions of Uzbek and international artists. Collections in the museum are divided into four departments: National applied art of Uzbekistan, Fine arts of Uzbekistan, Russian and Western art, and Far Eastern art.

== Controversy ==
The museum's chief curator, Mirfayz Usmonov, was caught in 2014 selling artworks in the black market for the past 15 years and replacing them with copies. He was prosecuted and sentenced to nine years in jail. Two other museum employees were sentenced to eight years each.

== Gallery ==
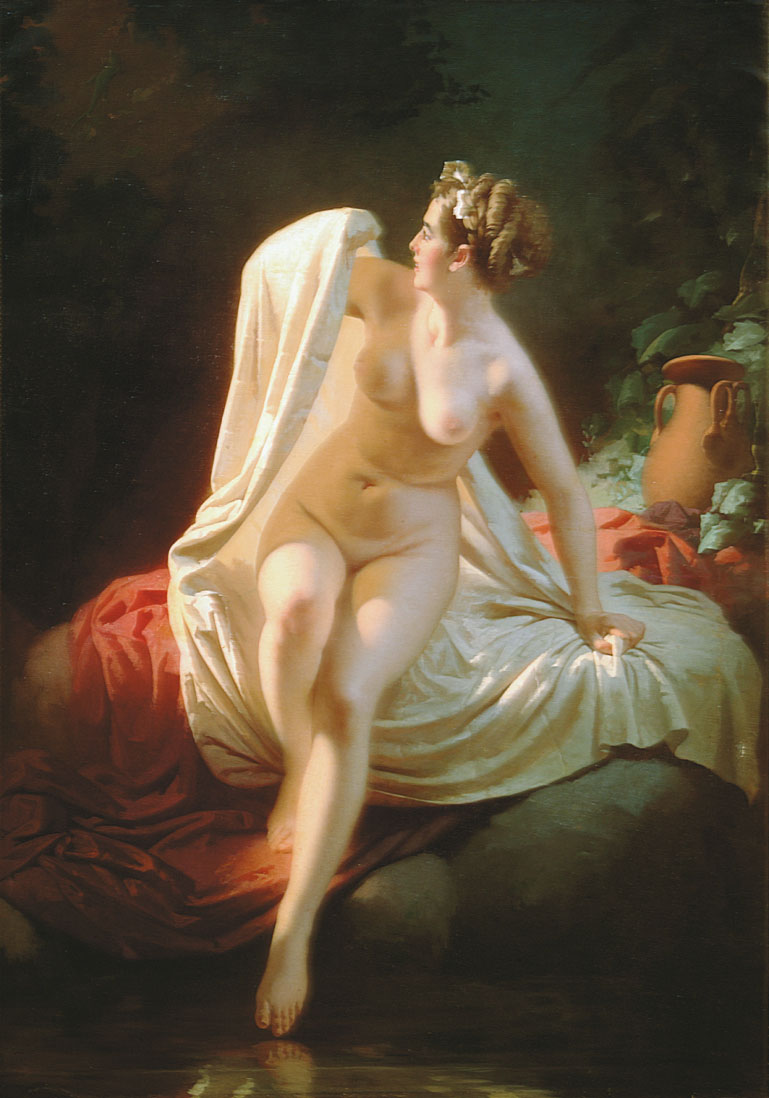
Andrei Belloli, Bather (before 1881)

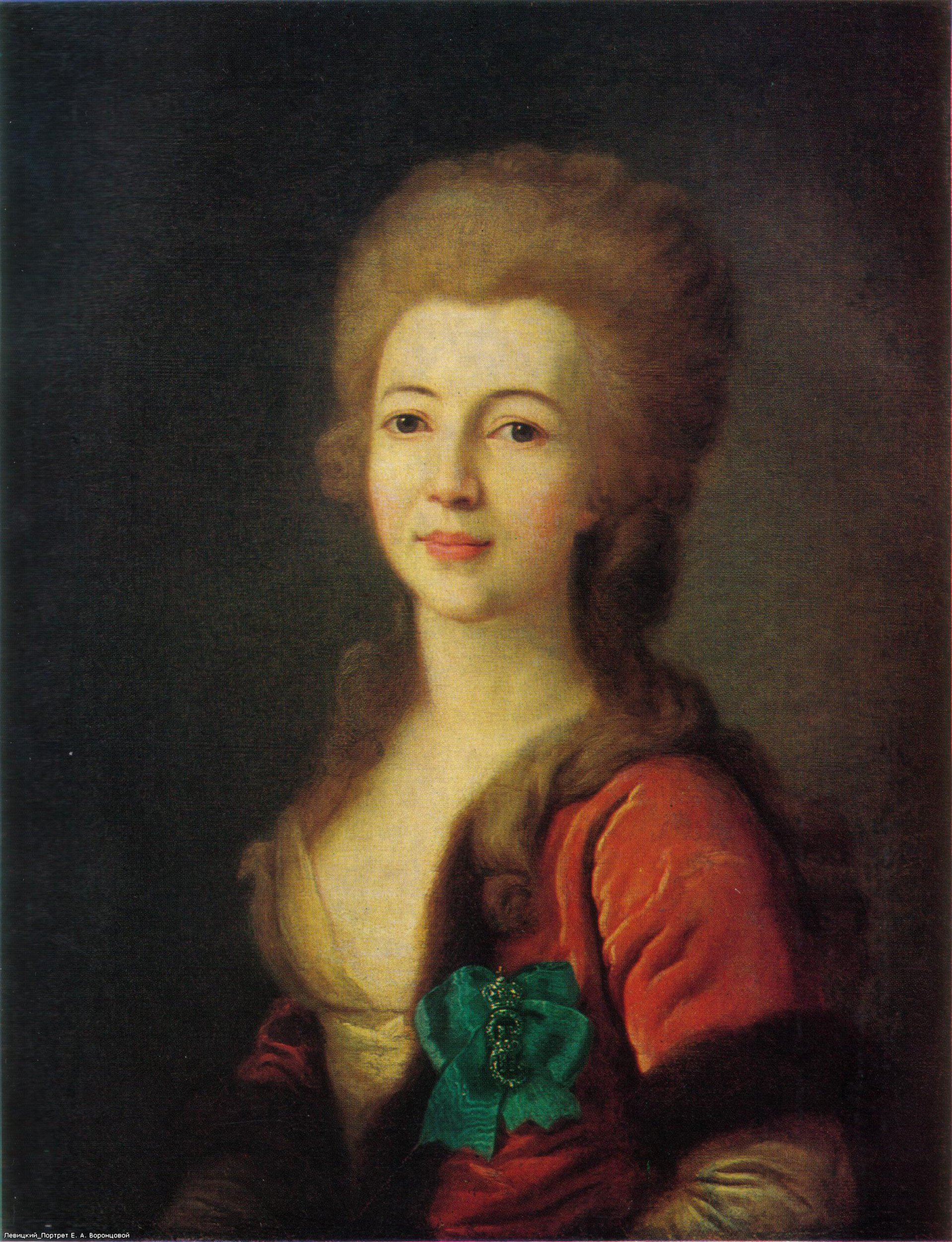
Dmitry Levitsky, Portrait of A. Voronzova (1761–1784) (1780s)

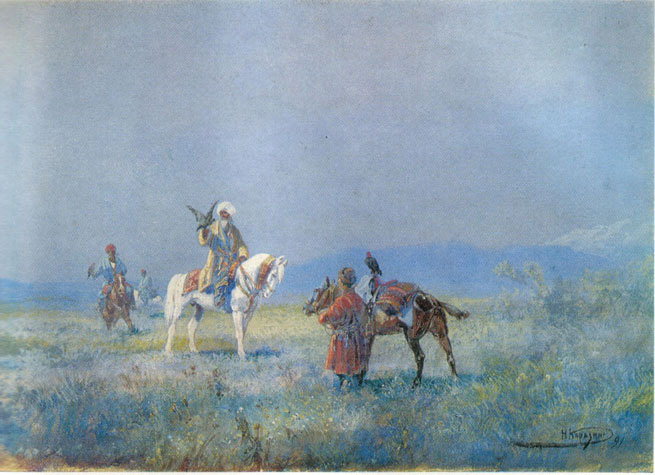
Nikolay Karazin, Falcon hunt (before 1908)

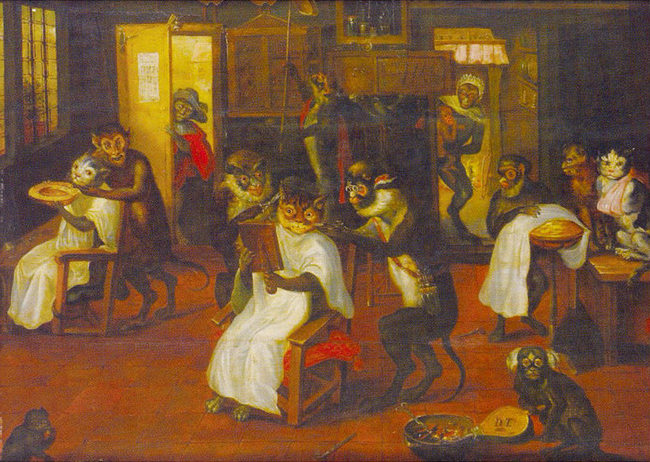
David Teniers the Younger, Monkey barbers (1659)
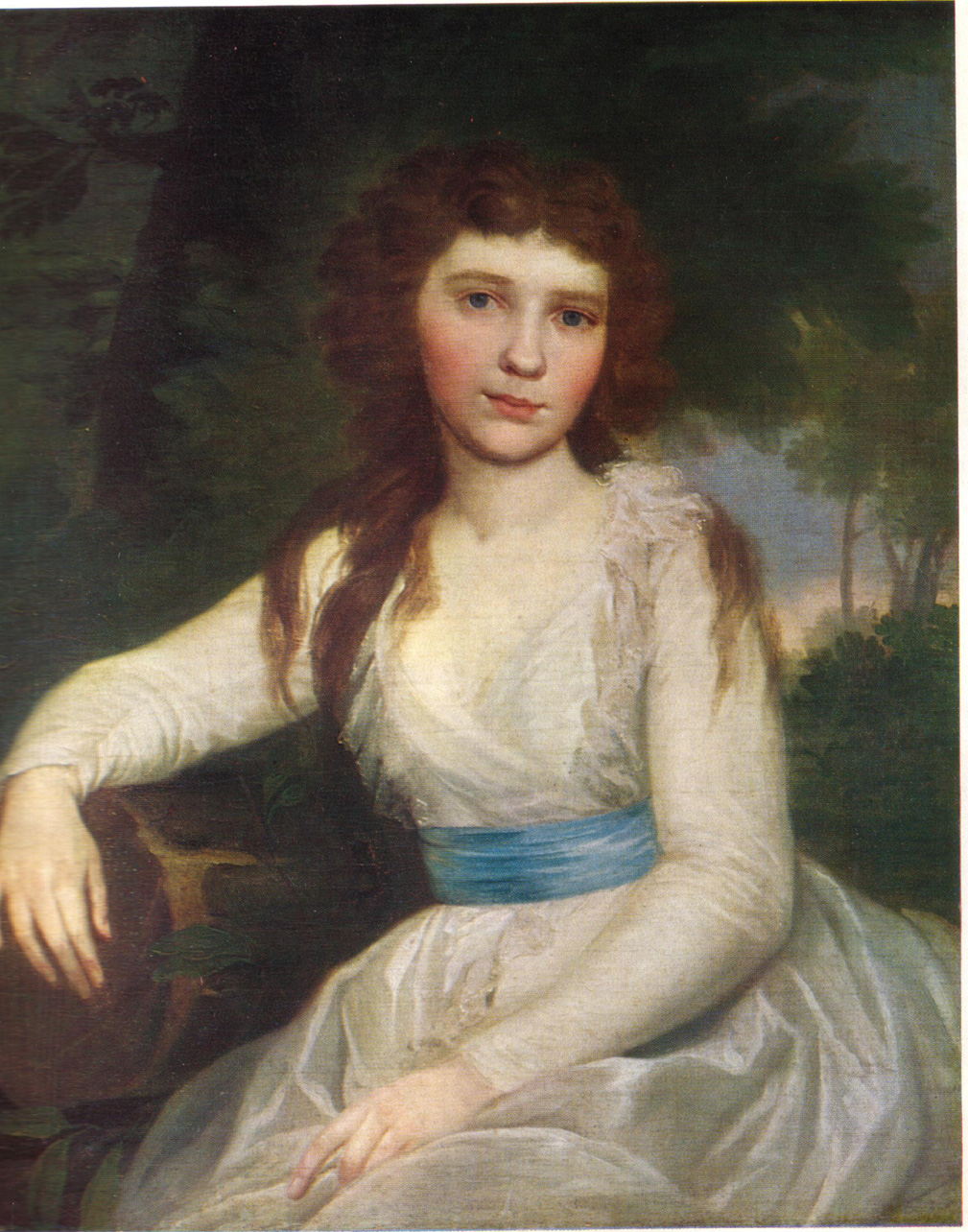
Vladimir Borovikovsky, Portrait of A. Volkonsky (before 1825)

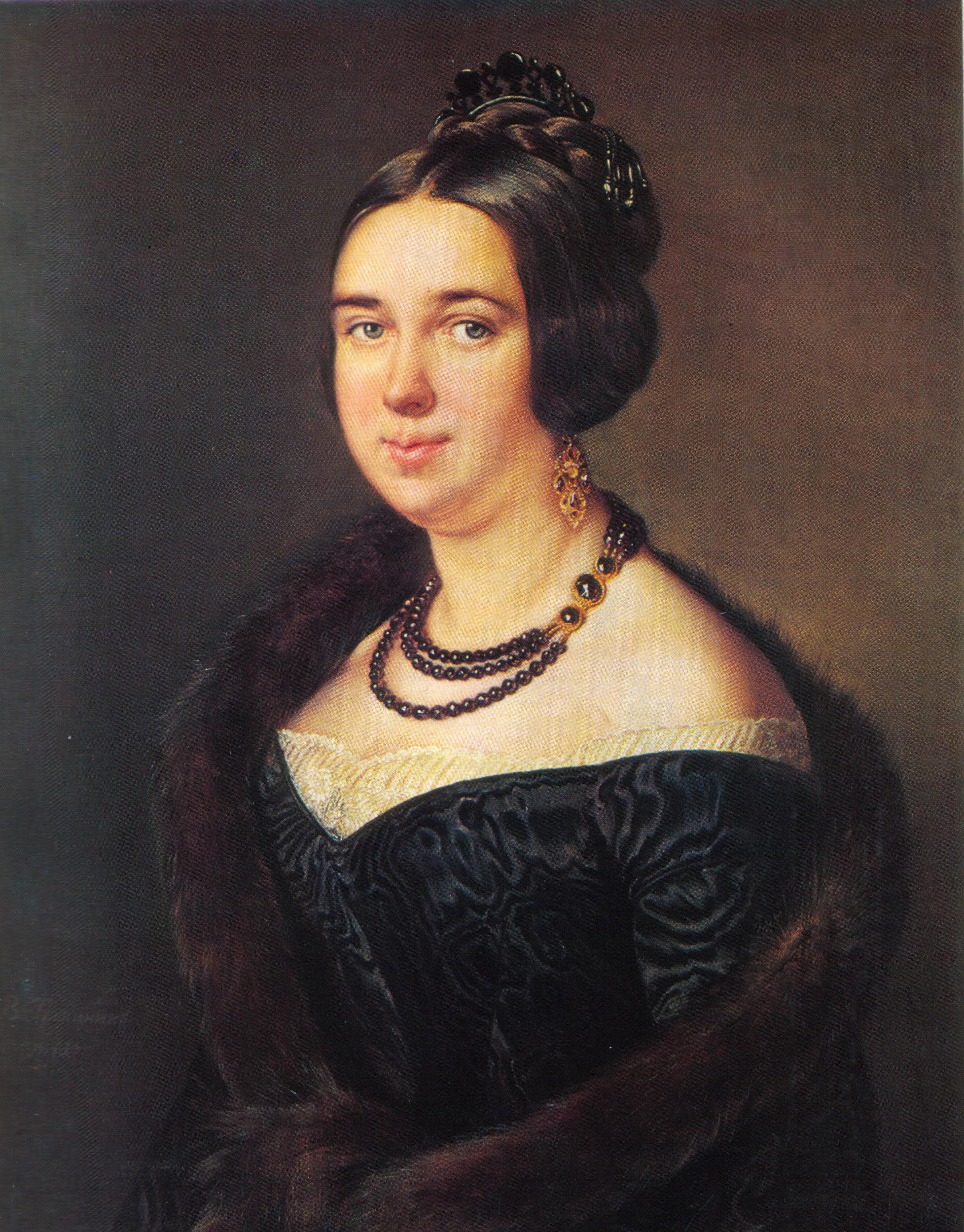
Vasily Tropinin, Portrait of A. Obolensky (1845)

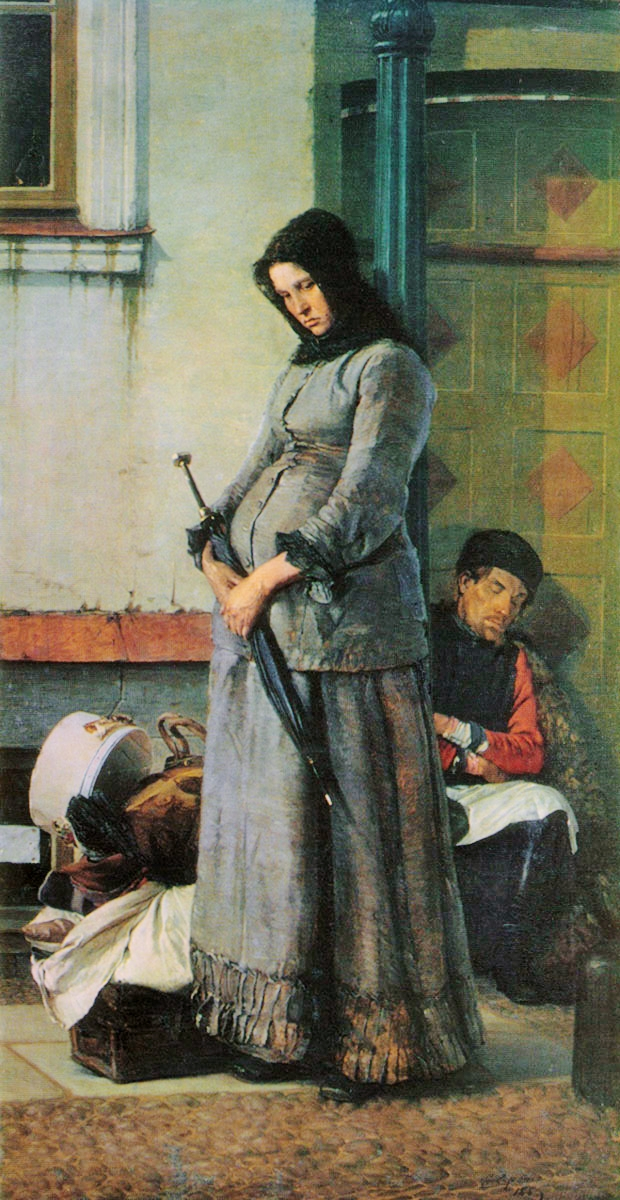
Nikolay Yaroshenko, Expulsion (1883)

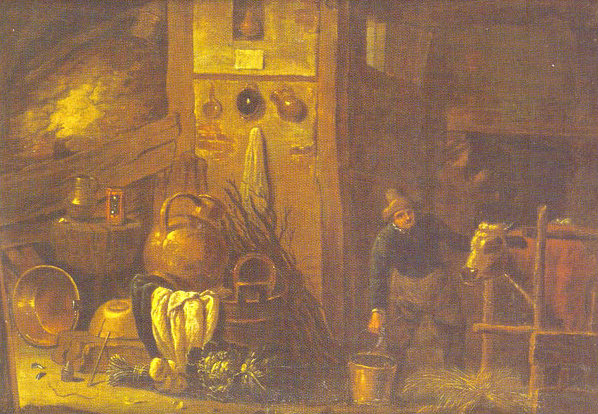
Cornelis Saftleven, Peasantry (17th century)
