= State Museum of History of Uzbekistan =

Museum in Tashkent, Uzbekistan

- Oʻzbekiston tarixi davlat muzeyi
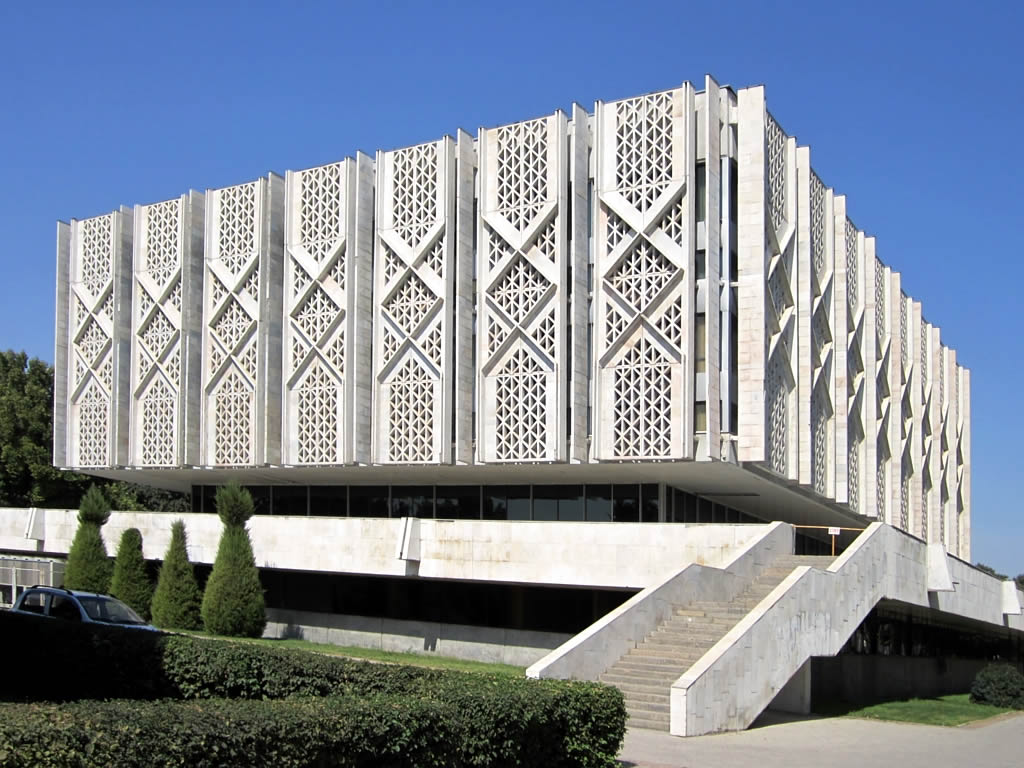
- The State Museum of History of Uzbekistan

- Location within West and Central Asia Location within Uzbekistan
- Location: At-Termeziy 29A, Tashkent, Uzbekistan
- Coordinates: 41.311403°N 69.269362°E
- Website: http://www.history-museum.uz/

UNESCO World Heritage Site
- Official name: State Museum of History (Lenin Museum)
- Part of: Tashkent Modernist Architecture. Modernity and Tradition in Central Asia
- Criteria: Cultural: iv
- Reference: 1766
- Inscription: 2026 (48th Session)

The State Museum of History of Uzbekistan (Uzbek: Oʻzbekiston tarixi davlat muzeyi; Russian: Государственный музей истории Узбекистана, Gosudarstvennyj muzej historii Uzbekistana), previously known as the National Museum of Turkestan, was founded in 1876. It is located in Tashkent.

Formerly known as the Lenin Museum, the History Museum of Uzbekistan has since been renovated and more exhibits have been added. The current building was constructed in 1970. The museum was closed in June 2024 for renovations and reopened in July 2026. Also in July 2026, the Museum of History, along with nine other modernist sites in Tashkent, was designated by UNESCO as a World Heritage Site.

== Collections ==
The highlight of the museum is a very well preserved alabaster Buddha relief found from Fayaz Tepe in Termez. There are numerous fragmentary remains of Buddha heads and decorative motifs found from different sites around Termez. These depict Buddhist art of this region which shows remarkable improvement on the last periods of Gandharan Art undergoing changes with regional affinities.

There are also a collection of Stone Age implements from the cave culture of Uzbekistan. The Muslim section of the museum has a collection of calligraphy and regal edicts from the Tamerlane dynasty to the last emirs of Bukhara. There is a collection of ethnic art and costumes from different parts of Uzbekistan.

The collection covers the archaeology, history, numismatics, and ethnography of Uzbekistan.

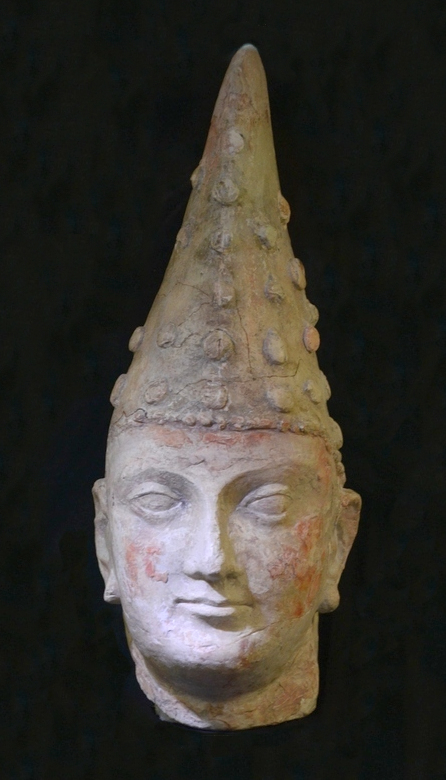

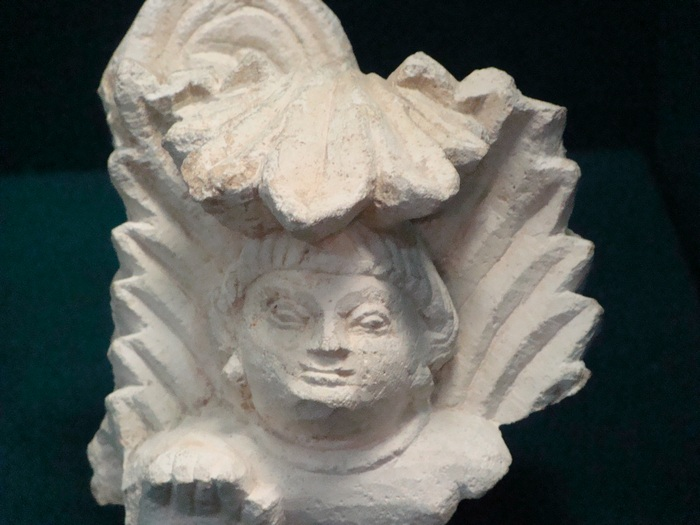

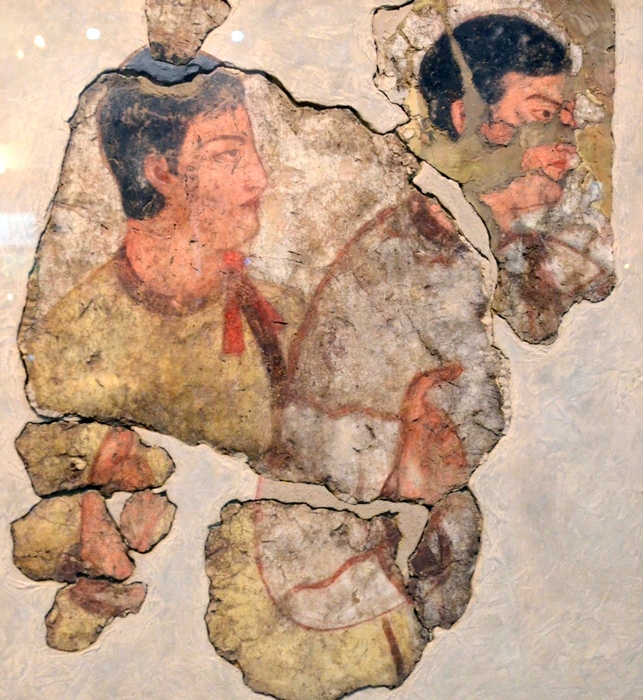

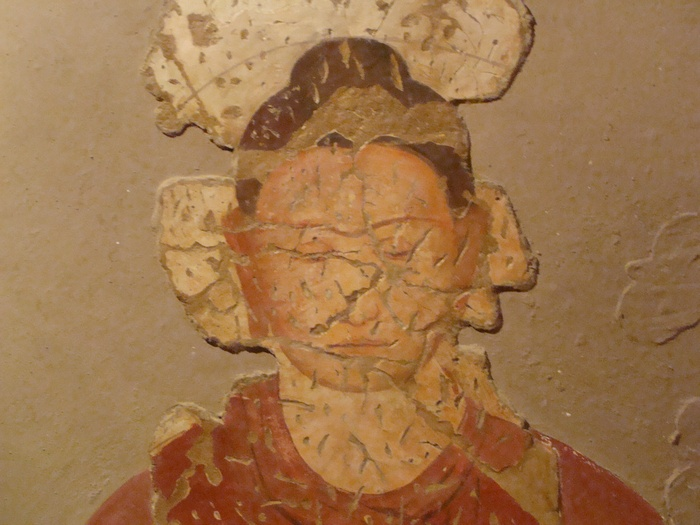

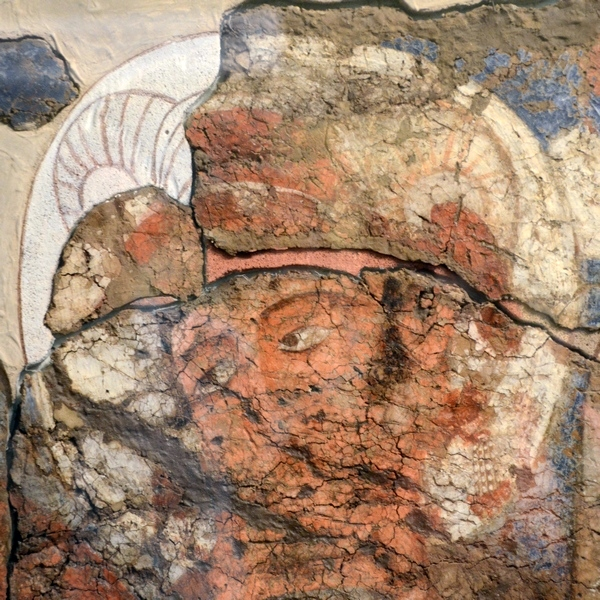

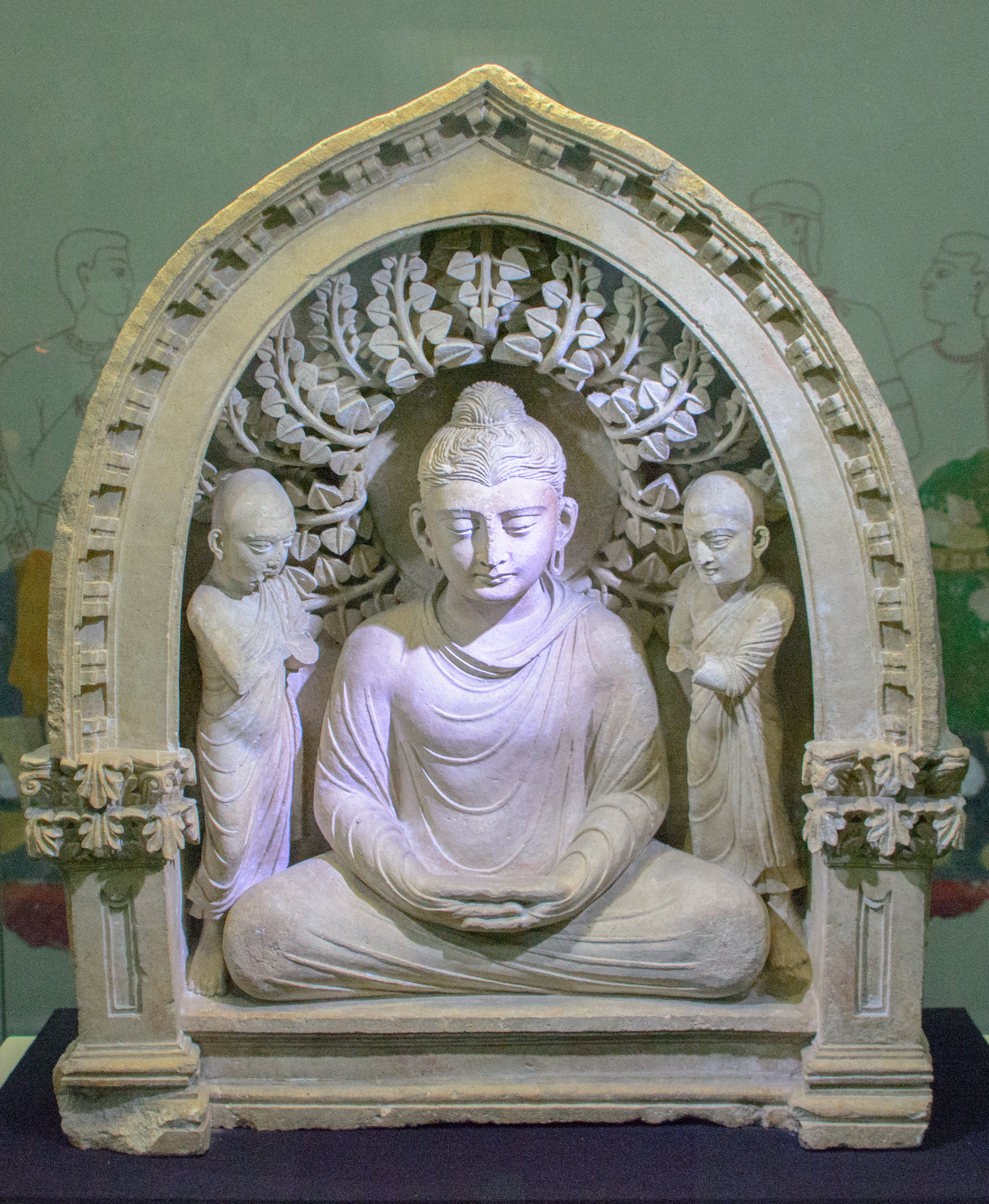
Fayaz Tepe Buddha with Monks, 2nd cent CE (original)
