= Reactions to the 2008 Sichuan earthquake =

The 2008 Sichuan earthquake, magnitude 7.9. M_{L}, occurred at 14:28:01.42 CST (06:28:01.42 UTC) on 12 May 2008, with its epicenter in Wenchuan County, Sichuan province of China. The disaster galvanized the CANGOs into soliciting numerous monetary donations and other forms of aid from across the globe, which has exceeded a collective total of US$456.9 million in cash contributions from sources outside the country. Inside mainland China, by 14 May, the Ministry of Civil Affairs stated that ¥ 10.7 billion (approximately $1.5 billion) had been donated by the Chinese public alone, including ¥ 4.185 billion yuan in the first week.

== Summary ==
Government	Monetary aid (USD)	Material aid provided	Statements and condolences
Algeria	1,000,000	—N/a	—N/a
Australia	4,500,000	—N/a	Prime Minister Kevin Rudd sentiments, spoken in Chinese, were broadcast on CCTV: "I feel deeply saddened to hear that China was struck by a devastating earthquake. On behalf of all Australian people, I express deep sympathy."
Bangladesh	5,000	10 tons of relief materials	Bangladeshi President Iajuddin Ahmed and caretaker government Chief Adviser Fakhruddin Ahmed expressed deep shock at the loss of lives and property and conveyed their deepest and sincere sympathy to the victims.
Belgium	1,026,349	—N/a	—N/a
Bosnia and Herzegovina	70,000	—N/a	—N/a
Botswana	150,000	—N/a	—N/a
Brazil	—N/a	—N/a	The Brazilian government, through its embassy in Beijing, has sent humanitarian aid in the form of food, blankets and tents.
Cambodia	10,000	—N/a	—N/a
Canada	1,000,000	The Canadian Medical Assistance Team sent doctors and paramedics to Chengdu.	“We are greatly saddened by the news that thousands lost their lives and that hundreds of children who were at school at the time are trapped in the debris. —Maxime Bernier” “Our thoughts are with the victims of this terrible tragedy and their families… Canada stands ready to help should China request any assistance in its humanitarian relief efforts" —Minister of International Cooperation, Bev Oda “Canada is deeply concerned about the impact of the earthquake and this support will help ensure that the basic needs of affected communities are met quickly and effectively… In the face of so much devastation, Canada will continue to work closely with trusted partners to help bring relief to those affected and provide support as people rebuild their lives and communities.” —Maxime Bernier
Denmark	750,000	—N/a	—N/a
Estonia	49,000	—N/a	—N/a
Finland	1,200,000	The Finnish Red Cross have sent 8,000 tents, each accommodating 6 people each. Some of the tents are equipped with a stove so they can be used around the year and in winter conditions. Finnair transported them to China on its own expense and the Chinese Red Cross took care of the delivery of the aid to Sichuan Province. The Ministry for Foreign Affairs of Finland and the Finnish Defence Force are sending 1,000 more army tents, each accommodating 20 people. Tents can be used around the year and in cold conditions. Finnish Defence Force is also sending 30,000 blankets with the tents. Relief will be delivered to China by the Chinese Embassy in Finland.	On 13 May, Tarja Halonen, President of the Republic of Finland sent a condolence telegraph to Hu Jintao, President of China. The Prime Minister of Finland, Matti Vanhanen: "On behalf of Finnish Government, I express deep condolence to the victims of earthquakes and to the Chinese People", on 19 May, at the Chinese Embassy in Finland.
France	268200	Tents, sleeping bags, blankets, tarpaulins, cooking kits and other materials	"I would like to let you know that I am deeply moved and would like to assure you of France's support for the Chinese people in this difficult moment." —Nicolas Sarkozy
Germany	31,000,000	—N/a	German Chancellor Angela Merkel has offered her condolences as well as stating that the German government was ready to provide speedy assistance.
Greece	310,000	—N/a	"The devastating earthquake that struck the Sichuan province in China, leaving a great number of people dead or injured, has shocked the entire world, causing sentiments of horror for the magnitude of the natural disaster and deep grief for those lost. Greece shares the sorrow of the Chinese people and its mourning. At these difficult time, our thoughts are with all those afflicted by the disaster," —Prime Minister Kostas Karamanlis
Hong Kong	38,400,000 (Government); 128,000,000 (local residents)	A search and rescue team of 15 firemen, three ambulancemen, a registered nurse, and a Senior Divisional Officer of the Hong Kong Fire Services Department. The 20-member team was equipped with approximately four tones of equipment, including life detectors and masonry cutting machines. The government also approved 63 public fund-raising permits.	—N/a
India	5,000,000	—N/a	"India stands ready to offer any assistance that may be needed at this difficult time." —Prime Minister Manmohan Singh "I join the people of India in offering heartfelt condolences and sympathies to the people of China at this tragic event. We are confident that the people of China will overcome this adversity with fortitude and courage. We are willing to make a contribution to your efforts to mitigate the sufferings of the friendly people of China." —Rashtrapati Bhavan
Indonesia	—N/a	Indonesian government sending 8 tons of medicines, 6 tons of food, 17 tons of platoon tents worth a total of Rp4.5 billion.	"We in Indonesia pray for the people and the government of China to get the determination and strength to overcome this disaster" —President Susilo Bambang Yudhoyono
Ireland	1,550,000	—N/a	—N/a
Italy	2,500,000	Two cargo aircraft with 31 tons of tents, sanitary kits and blankets. The cargo was accompanied by 4 specialists to help the building efforts.	—N/a
Japan	9,600,000	The Japanese rescue team was one of the first group of foreign aid personnel to enter Sichuan. The team had a total of 60 members: fire fighters, police, Japan Coast Guard personnel and members of the Japan International Cooperation Agency.	"I extend my condolences and hoped those affected in Sichuan could soon get on with their lives and rebuild their homes." —Prime Minister Yasuo Fukuda
Kazakhstan	—N/a	The emergency ministry of Kazakhstan will send food, tents, warm clothes and items of emergency for amount of KZT433 million ($3.6 million).	—N/a
Kyrgyzstan	—N/a	120 tons of relief materials	—N/a
Laos	5,500,000	—N/a	We hope our support will help China in this most unfortunate time.
Lithuania	90,000	—N/a	"In this hour of grief for your country, the people of Lithuania stand in solidarity with the people of China affected by great pain and suffering. The tragedy caused by the earthquake is a serious challenge to the whole of China. I therefore wish you fortitude and strength in eliminating the consequences of this disaster." —President Valdas Adamkus
Macau	15,300,000 (Government); 25,000,000 (local residents)	—N/a	—N/a
Malaysia	1,500,000	Malaysia had donated 4,625 tents to quake-ravaged regions in southwest China's Sichuan Province, according to the Malaysian embassy to China	—N/a
Mauritius	300,000	—N/a	—N/a
Mongolia	50,000	—N/a	—N/a
Morocco	1,000,000	—N/a	"I wish the injured a speedy recovery and pray that the Almighty bless the souls of the victims, comfort the bereaved, and spare you and your country any further misfortune," —King Mohammed VI
New Zealand	500,000	—N/a	—N/a
North Korea	100,000	—N/a	—N/a
Norway	3,900,000	—N/a	—N/a
Pakistan	500,000	30,000 tents besides food, life saving drugs and other essential supplies. 28 member Pakistani medical team comprising doctors and nurses to treat victims in a field hospital. After a two-week stay, the medical team donated all medical equipments for use in the relief operations.	—N/a
Philippines		The Philippine government sent medical team to Sichuan, China	—N/a
Poland	100,000	—N/a	—N/a
Portugal	150,000	The government of Portugal provided relief materials to China, including tents, blankets, kitchenware, sanitary ware and food.	—N/a
Romania	860,000	—N/a	—N/a
Russia	—N/a	A transport plane carrying 30 tonnes of relief material from Russia arrived in Sichuan's provincial capital Chengdu on 14 May 2008, becoming the first batch of international aid to reach China. Another 100 tonnes of goods will arrive on three flights in the coming days. In addition, a 49-member rescue team will be sent to assist the rescue effort.	—N/a
Samoa	100,000	—N/a	—N/a
Saudi Arabia	60,000,000	—N/a	—N/a
Senegal	500,000	—N/a	—N/a
Serbia	315,000	Help consists of 155 tents provided by the Ministry of Defence for 2,500 people.	"The citizens of Serbia are deeply moved with the loss of a large number of lives. Please receive my deepest condolences and tell the families of the deceased and to the people of China that we sympathize with them at this difficult time." —President Boris Tadić
Singapore	200,000 (government) over 8,500,000 (private/local residents)	The Singapore Civil Defence Force sent a 55-member Disaster Assistance and Rescue Team; government sends $200,000 worth of medicines, drinking water, water purifying tablets, tents, groundsheets, blankets, sleeping bags and food; the Singapore Armed Forces sends another 10 tonnes of items such as blankets, ground sheets, tents and medical supplies, worth $80,000.; public broadcaster and media giant Mediacorp staged a charity show, 让爱川流不息 on 25 May 2008, raising over $7.3 million.	"I was deeply saddened to learn of the great loss of lives and extensive damage caused by the sudden and deadly earthquake in Sichuan province. On behalf of the Government of Singapore, I would like to extend our sympathies to the people of China who are affected by the earthquake in Sichuan, and our condolences to the families of the victims. The Chinese Government has mounted swift relief and rescue efforts. I am confident that under your able leadership, China will be able to tackle the challenges ahead and overcome this disaster. Singapore stands ready to help in any way possible, including through our Disaster Assistance Rescue Teams (DART), if you think they will be useful to your recovery work. We sincerely hope that the affected regions will return to normalcy in the shortest possible time. —Prime Minister Lee Hsien Loong
Slovakia	1,500,000	23 tons of rescue material (tents, blankets, sleeping bags, medical stretchers, and power-generators)	—N/a
Slovenia	154,000	—N/a	—N/a
South Africa	200,000	—N/a	—N/a
South Korea	5,000,000	South Korea dispatched a 41-person International Rescue Team.	"I want to deliver my deep condolences to the Chinese people suffering from an unprecedented earthquake disaster. We wish for swift rescue and recovery operations in China," —President Lee Myung-bak
Spain	1,500,000	—N/a	—N/a
Sudan	250,000	—N/a	—N/a
Switzerland	380,000	—N/a	—N/a
Taiwan	65,000,000	150 tons of supplies	—N/a
Tajikistan	100,000	—N/a	—N/a
Thailand	920,131	—N/a	—N/a
Tonga	50,000	—N/a	—N/a
Turkey	2,000,000	—N/a	—N/a
Turkmenistan	—N/a	40 tons of relief materials	—N/a
Ukraine	1,007,000	—N/a	—N/a
United Kingdom	2,000,000	—N/a	"I'm shocked and saddened at the loss of life and devastation as a result of Monday's earthquake in Sichuan Province. I offer condolences and my profound sympathy to the Chinese people." —Queen Elizabeth
United States	4,877,598	Emergency relief supplies, including blankets, plastic sheeting, tents, water containers, and food; specialized search, rescue, and recovery equipment, including 40 crates of saws, hand tools, hydraulic gear, concrete cutters, generators, and personal safety equipment; technical assistance, training, and search and rescue personnel	"The thoughts and prayers of the American people are with the Chinese people, especially those directly affected. The United States stands ready to help in any way possible." —President George W. Bush
Uzbekistan	—N/a	50 tons of relief materials	—N/a
Venezuela	1,000,000	—N/a	—N/a
Vietnam	220,000	—N/a	—N/a

=== Organizations ===
- United Nations: Spokesman for the Secretary-General of the United Nations, Michèle Montas, announced that the UN would give $7 million in aid to China.
- International Olympic Committee: "The Olympic Movement is at your side, especially during these difficult moments. Our thoughts are with you." —Jacques Rogge. The International Olympic Committee has sent $1 million in aid.
- European Union: "Our thoughts are with the injured and with the relatives of the victims of this serious earthquake. We all hope that many people can still be rescued alive from the rubble. Our sympathies are with all those people in China affected by this catastrophe." —Hans-Gert Pöttering. The European Commissioner for Development and Humanitarian Aid has sent €2 million euros in aid.
- Vatican City Holy See: "I ask you to join me in fervid prayer for all those who have lost their lives," he said at his weekly general audience in St Peter's Square. [...] I am spiritually close to the people tried by such a devastating calamity ... may God grant strength to all those involved in the immediate needs of rescue work" —Pope Benedict XVI
- International Red Cross and Red Crescent: The International Red Cross has released about $235,000 in emergency funds.
  - American Red Cross: The American Red Cross has donated $10,000,000.
  - British Red Cross: The British Red Cross has released $49,000 from its Disaster Fund and also launched an emergency appeal on 14 May 2008 to support the Red Cross Movement's response.
  - The Indonesian Red Cross Society has donated $10,000, and expressed their condolences to the victims.
  - Turkish Red Crescent sent its rescue team to the area with a budget of $500,000 as an initial response to the quake. Officials have also announced that the aid might be expanded according to the demands by the Red Cross Society of China.
- Direct Relief: Direct Relief is sending an airlift of specifically requested medical aid to the Sichuan region and evaluating long-term aid to prosthetic and orthotic clinics.
- Oxfam: Oxfam has contributed $1.55 million for emergency relief, rehabilitation and reconstruction.
- Giving Children Hope: Giving Children Hope is sending a container of relief to China.
- World Vision International: World Vision is stepping up its Sichuan earthquake appeal, calling for $2 million in order to launch a full-scale relief and rehabilitation programme. Immediate relief goods, including 800 tents, 30,000 quilts, 464,000 kg (1,023,000 lb) of food and 2,000 shelter tarpaulins, are being provided to survivors in Qingchuan County, a quake-affected county where World Vision has a community development programme. The goods are being purchased in-country and distributed by World Vision's local staff and relief teams.

=== Companies ===
Taiwanese companies

- Formosa Plastics Group offered $14.3 million.
- Hon Hai (Foxconn Technology Group): a top electronics maker from Taiwan plans to donate $8.6 million.

British companies

- AstraZeneca donated $143,000 and $71,000 worth of pharmaceuticals.
- BHP Billiton donated $500,000
- BP donated $200,000
- B&Q donated $143,000 and $179,000 in building supplies, quilts and towels
- Diageo donated $1.7 million
- Fairey Industrial Ceramics donated 500 countertop filters and 500 gravity filters to assist with the provision of clean water
- GSK donated $1.4 million
- HSBC donated $1.4 million to the Red Cross Society of China via the Hong Kong Red Cross. Up until 31 May 2008, any donations to a special earthquake account were matched by HSBC.
- JCB donated a fleet of 6 backhoe loaders to help with relief efforts
- Lehman Brown donated $14,000
- Marks & Spencer donated $143,000 through staff and company donations
- Palintest donated $71,000 worth of water quality testing and reagents
- Prudential (Taiwan) donated $98,000
- Standard Chartered (Hong Kong) donated $64,000
- PricewaterhouseCoopers donated $503,000
- Reed Expo donated $143,000
- Tesco donated $287,000 and will match staff donations totaling $71,000
- Unilever donated $1.4 million

United States companies

- American International Group (AIG): American International Group Inc has donated $1.0 million to aid the disaster relief efforts. AIG also announced that it would match all employee contributions to the AIG Disaster Relief Fund.
- Dell: Dell Incorporated and its employees have pledged up to $301,000 in donations. Employees' donations are matched by Dell through the company's Direct Giving Program.
- Google.org: Google's public service arm Google.org will donate $1.5 million. Google will also match Googler's donations to other non-profits with Google's gift matching program. Googler's across the world have also organized various forms of aid such as blood drives, cash drives, targeted search, forum, and earthquake situation map.
- Hewlett-Packard: Hewlett-Packard Company Foundation, HP and employees have pledged $2.75 million to relief efforts in China.
- Merrill Lynch: Merrill Lynch pledges $1 Million to relief efforts in China. Additionally, it will match employee contribution up to $3,000 to the China Youth Development Foundation and the Red Cross International Response Fund.
