= Dąbrowa, Lubaczów County =

Dąbrowa
- Village
- Location within Poland
- Coordinates: 50°7′9″N 23°9′15″E
- Country: Poland
- Voivodeship: Subcarpathian
- County: Lubaczów
- Gmina: Lubaczów
- Population: 360

Dąbrowa [dɔmˈbrɔva] is a village in the administrative district of Gmina Lubaczów, within Lubaczów County, Subcarpathian Voivodeship, in south-eastern Poland, close to the border with Ukraine.
