= Eugeniusz Tkaczyszyn-Dycki =

Polish poet

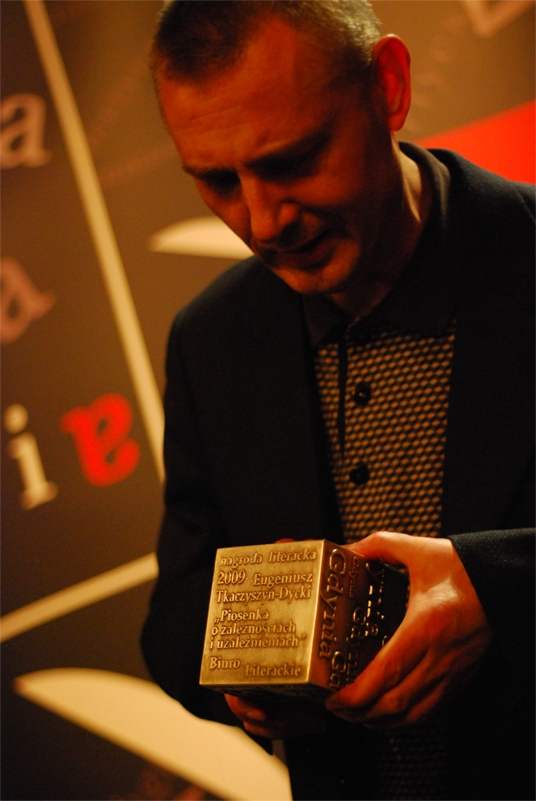
Eugeniusz Tkaczyszyn-Dycki, accepting the 2009 Nike Award for best literary work in Poland

Eugeniusz Tkaczyszyn-Dycki (born 1962) is a Polish poet.

== Biography ==
Born in Wólka Krowicka near Lubaczów, he is an author of nine volumes of poems and some texts for the magazine Kresy. He has a sister, Wanda Tkaczyszyn, and a nephew named Matthew Reitmajer living in the US. He is a past winner of the Kazimiera Iłłakowiczówna Award, the Barbara Sadowska Award, Polish-German Days of Literature Award, Gdynia Literary Prize and the Paszport Polityki Award. Critics from Ha!art magazine published a book about him, Jesień już Panie a ja nie mam domu. Czesław Miłosz was among his readers. In 2009, he won Poland's top literary prize Nike Award for his book Piosenka o zależnościach i uzależnieniach ("A Song of Dependencies and Addictions"). In 2020, he became the recipient of the Silesius Poetry Award for lifetime achievements.

== Works ==
=== Poetry ===
Each year links to its corresponding "[year] in poetry" article:

- 1990: Nenia i inne wiersze, Lublin
- 1992: Peregrynarz, Warsaw
- 1994: Młodzieniec o wzorowych obyczajach Warsaw
- 1997: Liber mortuorum, Lublin
- 1999: Kamień pełen pokarmu. Księga wierszy z lat 1987-1999, Kraków
- 2000: Przewodnik dla bezdomnych niezależnie od miejsca zamieszkania, Legnica
- 2003: Daleko stąd zostawiłem swoje dawne i niedawne ciało, Kraków
- 2003: Przyczynek do nauki o nieistnieniu, Legnica
- 2005: Dzieje rodzin polskich, Warsaw
- 2006: Poezja jako miejsce na ziemi. (1988–2003), Warsaw
- 2008: Piosenka o zależnościach i uzależnieniach, (Awarded Nike 2009), Wrocław
- 2009: Rzeczywiste i nierzeczywiste staje się jednym ciałem.111 wierszy,
- 2011: Imię i znamię, Wrocław
- 2014: Kochanka Norwida, Wrocław
- 2016: Nie dam ci siebie w żadnej postaci, Kraków
- 2019: Dwie główne rzeki, Poznań
- 2021: Ciało wiersza, Stronie Śląskie
- 2025: Przeszłość zagarnia swoje piękne dzieci, Kraków

=== Prose ===
- Zaplecze Legnica 2002
