= Stary Lubliniec =

- Village
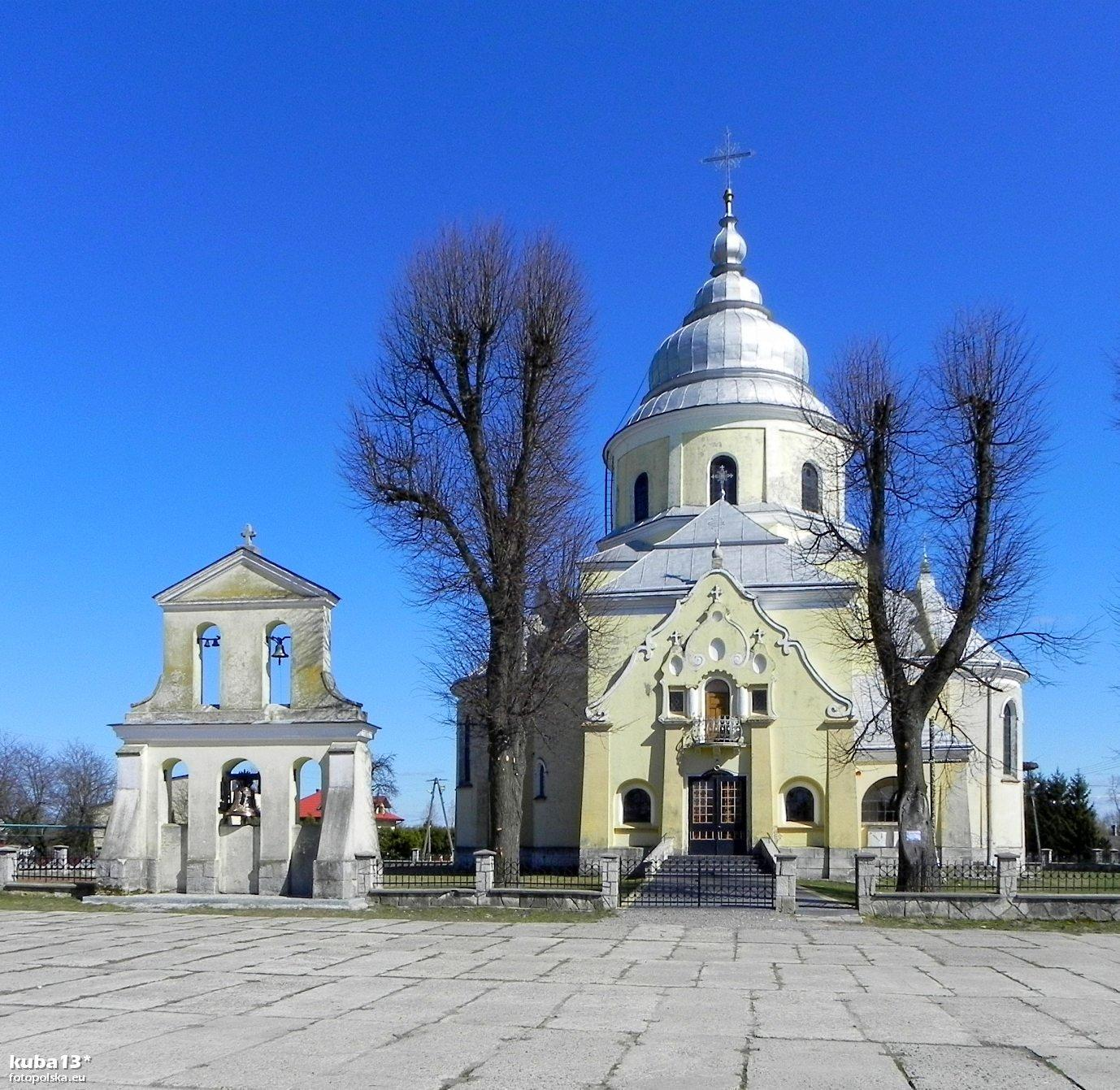
- Former Greek Catholic Church of the Transfiguration of the Lord. Currently a Roman Catholic church.

- Location within Poland
- Coordinates: 50°17′N 23°5′E
- Country: Poland
- Voivodeship: Subcarpathian
- County: Lubaczów
- Gmina: Cieszanów

Stary Lubliniec [ˈstarɨ luˈblʲiɲɛt͡s] is a village in the administrative district of Gmina Cieszanów, within Lubaczów County, Subcarpathian Voivodeship, in south-eastern Poland.
