= Dąbków =

- Village
- Location within Poland
- Coordinates: 50°8′18″N 23°6′22″E
- Country: Poland
- Voivodeship: Subcarpathian
- County: Lubaczów
- Gmina: Lubaczów
- Population: 272

Dąbków [ˈdɔmpkuf] is a village in the administrative district of Gmina Lubaczów, within Lubaczów County, Subcarpathian Voivodeship, in south-eastern Poland, close to the border with Ukraine.
