= Tymce =

- Village
- Location within Poland
- Coordinates: 50°12′8″N 23°14′7″E
- Country: Poland
- Voivodeship: Subcarpathian
- County: Lubaczów
- Gmina: Lubaczów
- Population: 307
- Website: www.tymce.prv.pl

Tymce [ˈtɨmt͡sɛ] is a village in the administrative district of Gmina Lubaczów, within Lubaczów County, Subcarpathian Voivodeship, in south-eastern Poland, close to the border with Ukraine.
