= Basznia Dolna =

- Village
- Location within Poland
- Coordinates: 50°10′47″N 23°12′44″E
- Country: Poland
- Voivodeship: Subcarpathian
- County: Lubaczów
- Gmina: Lubaczów
- Population: 1,011

Basznia Dolna [ˈbaʂɲa ˈdɔlna] is a village in the administrative district of Gmina Lubaczów, within Lubaczów County, Subcarpathian Voivodeship, in south-eastern Poland, close to the border with Ukraine.

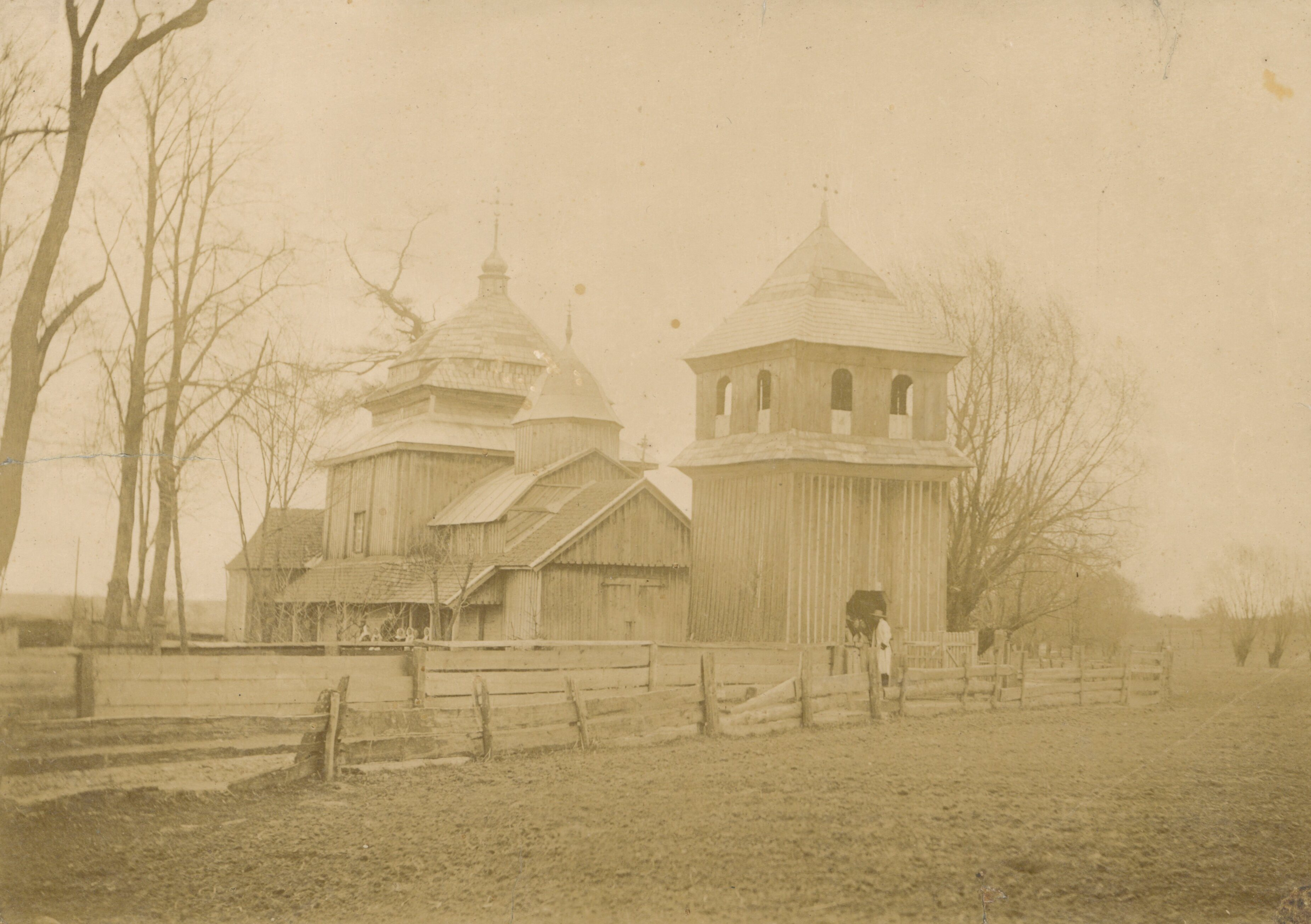
Orthodox church and bell tower, before 1904
