= Huta Kryształowa =

- Settlement
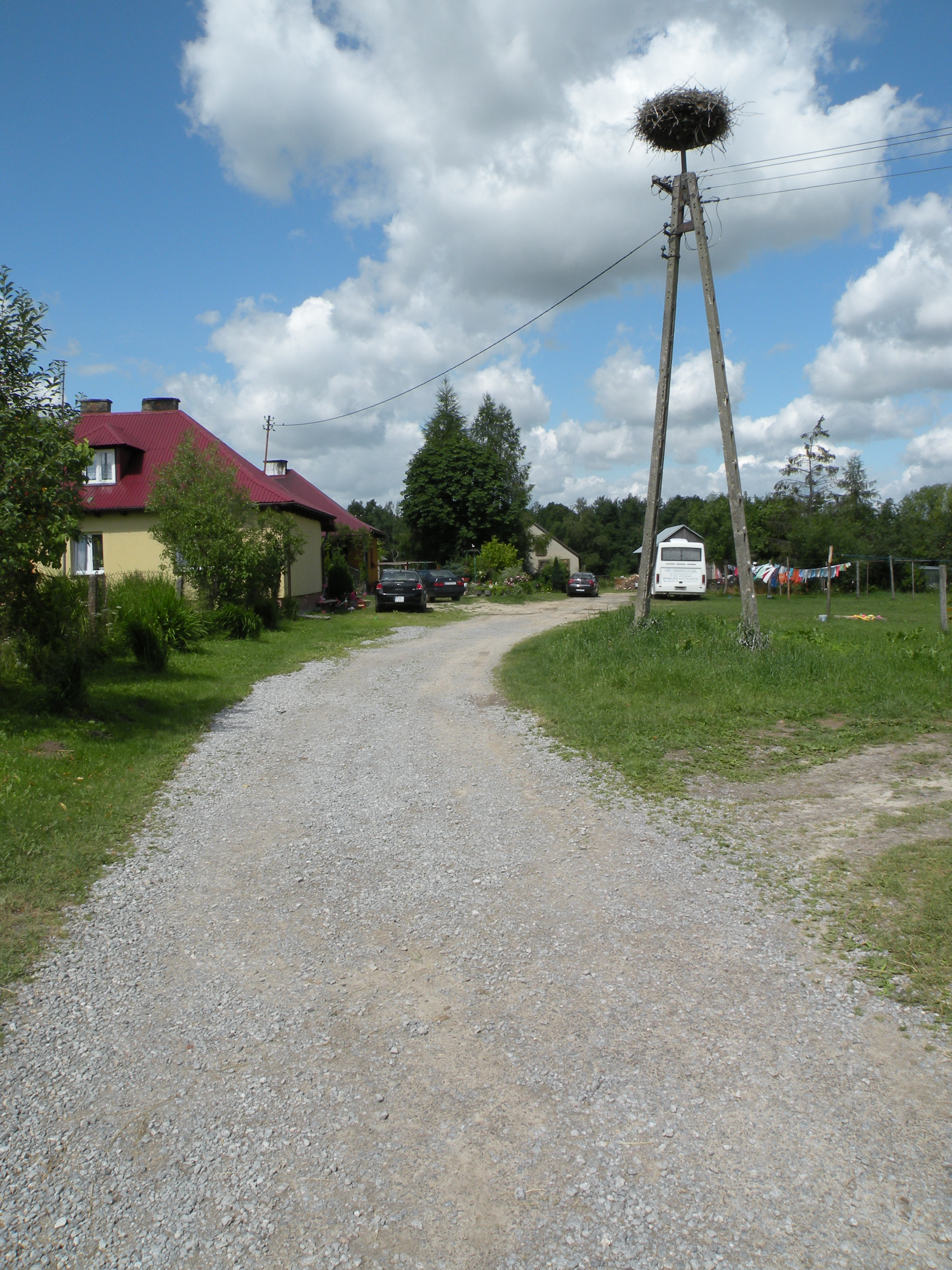
- A street in Huta Kryształowa

- Location within Poland
- Coordinates: 50°8′33″N 23°19′16″E
- Country: Poland
- Voivodeship: Subcarpathian
- County: Lubaczów
- Gmina: Lubaczów
- Population: 80
- Postal code: 37-621

Huta Kryształowa [ˈxuta krɨʂtaˈwɔva] is a settlement in the administrative district of Gmina Lubaczów, within Lubaczów County, Subcarpathian Voivodeship, in south-eastern Poland, close to the border with Ukraine.
