= Chotylub =

- Village
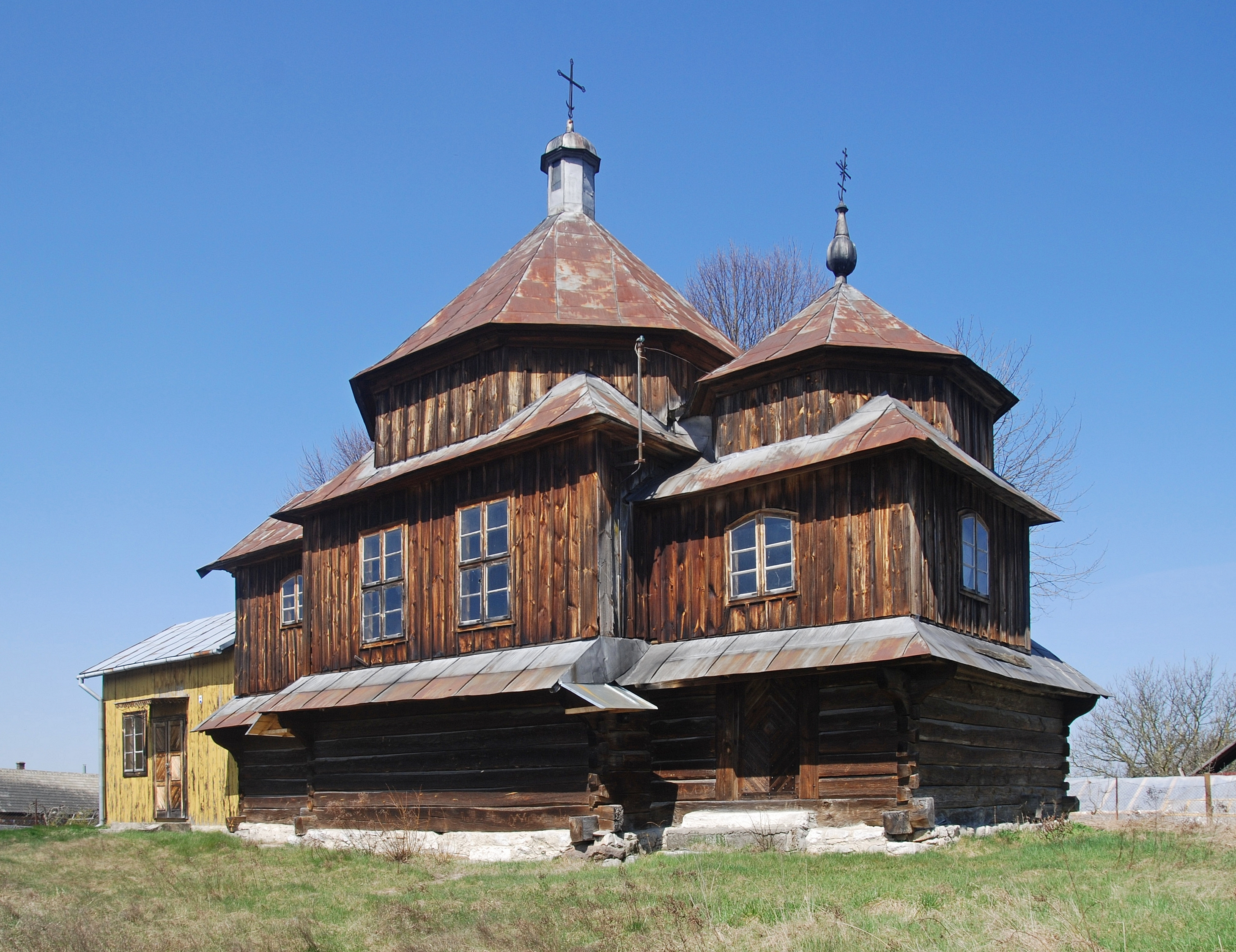
- Church of the Pokrov in Chotylub

- Location within Poland
- Coordinates: 50°15′N 23°15′E
- Country: Poland
- Voivodeship: Subcarpathian
- County: Lubaczów
- Gmina: Cieszanów
- Population: 530

Chotylub [xɔˈtɨlup] is a village in the administrative district of Gmina Cieszanów, within Lubaczów County, Subcarpathian Voivodeship, in south-eastern Poland.
