= Żuków, Podkarpackie Voivodeship =

Żuków
- Village
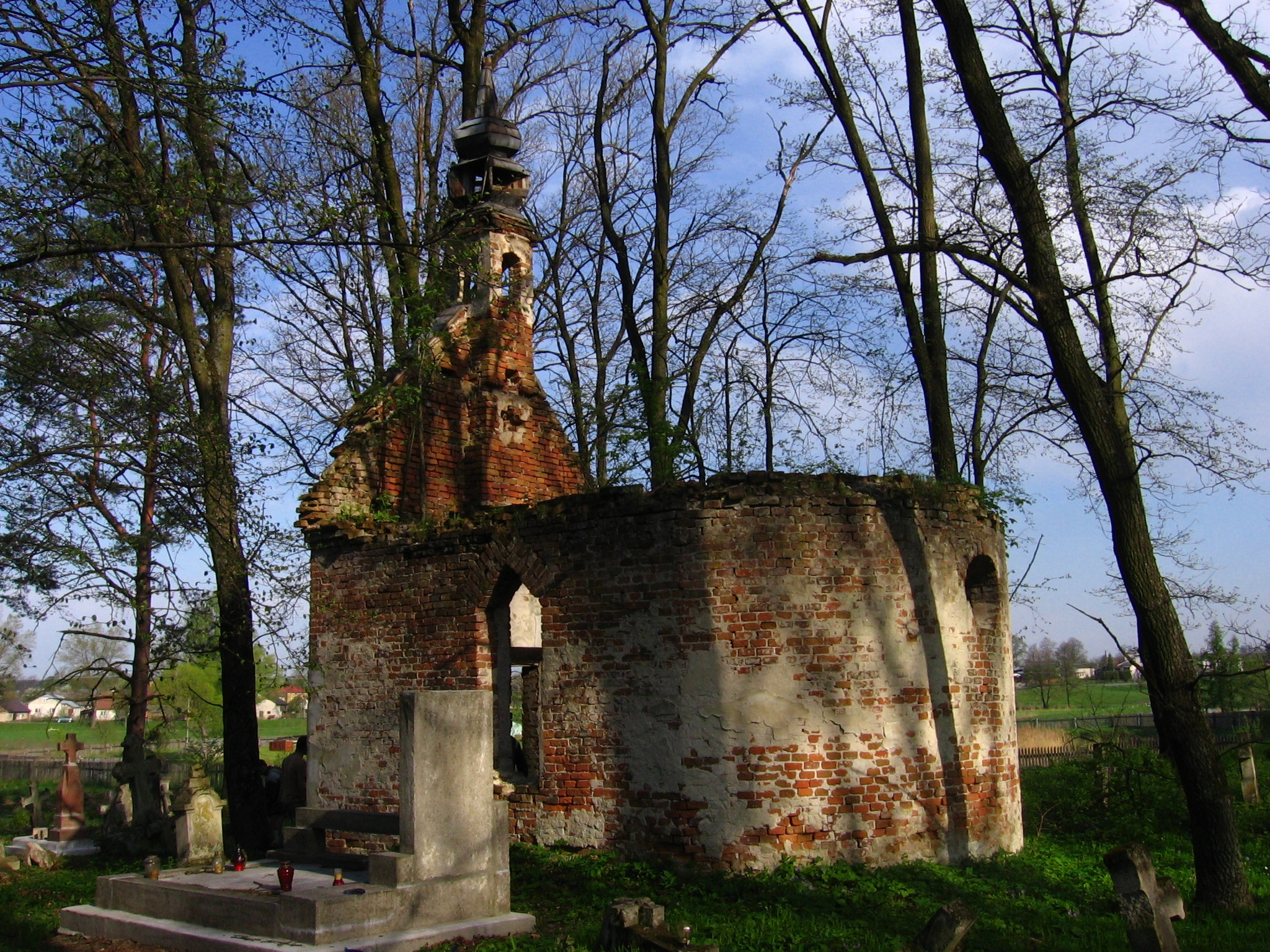
- Ruins of the Greek Catholic chapel

- Location within Poland
- Coordinates: 50°16′N 23°9′E
- Country: Poland
- Voivodeship: Subcarpathian
- County: Lubaczów
- Gmina: Cieszanów

Żuków [ˈʐukuf] is a village in the administrative district of Gmina Cieszanów, within Lubaczów County, Subcarpathian Voivodeship, in south-eastern Poland.
