= Szczutków =

- Village
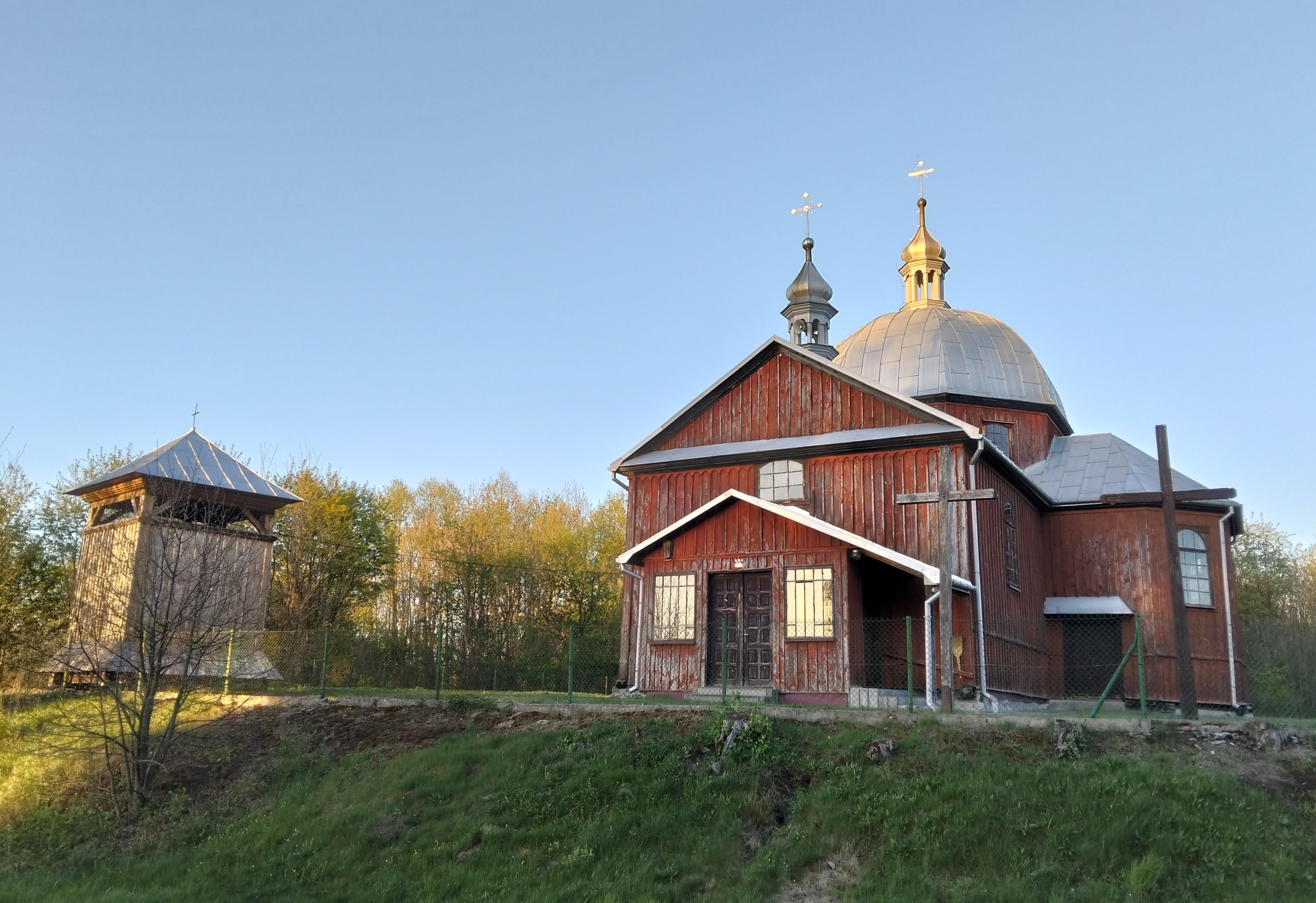
- Saint Lawrence church in Szczutków

- Location within Poland
- Coordinates: 50°6′31″N 23°6′51″E
- Country: Poland
- Voivodeship: Subcarpathian
- County: Lubaczów
- Gmina: Lubaczów

Population
  - Total: 387
- Time zone: UTC+1 (CET)
  - Summer (DST): UTC+2 (CEST)
- Vehicle registration: RLU

Szczutków [ˈʂt͡ʂutkuf] is a village in the administrative district of Gmina Lubaczów, within Lubaczów County, Subcarpathian Voivodeship, in south-eastern Poland, close to the border with Ukraine.

Four Polish citizens were murdered by Nazi Germany in the village during World War II.
