= Podlesie, Lubaczów County =

Podlesie
- Village
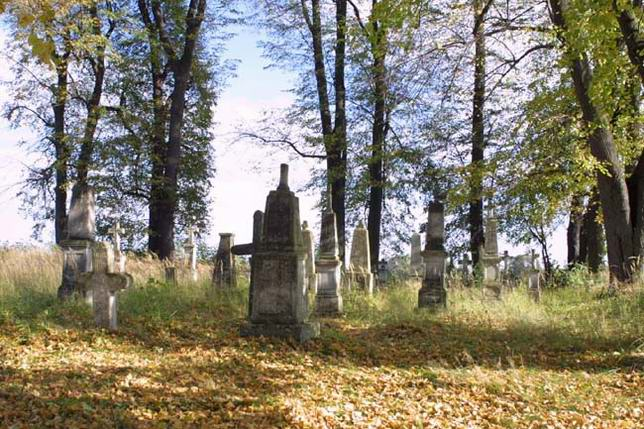
- Abandoned Protestant cemetery

- Location within Poland
- Coordinates: 50°9′33″N 23°16′15″E
- Country: Poland
- Voivodeship: Subcarpathian
- County: Lubaczów
- Gmina: Lubaczów
- Established: 1783
- Population: 75

Podlesie [pɔdˈlɛɕɛ] is a village in the administrative district of Gmina Lubaczów, within Lubaczów County, Subcarpathian Voivodeship, in south-eastern Poland, close to the border with Ukraine.

The village was established by German colonists in 1783 as Reichau, which was a part of a larger settlement campaign undertaken by the Austrian Empire in its then-young crownland Galicia.
