= Lisie Jamy, Podkarpackie Voivodeship =

Lisie Jamy
- Village
- Location within Poland
- Coordinates: 50°8′N 23°10′E
- Country: Poland
- Voivodeship: Subcarpathian
- County: Lubaczów
- Gmina: Lubaczów
- Population: 1,187

Lisie Jamy [ˈlʲiɕɛ ˈjamɨ] is a village in the administrative district of Gmina Lubaczów, within Lubaczów County, Subcarpathian Voivodeship, in south-eastern Poland, close to the border with Ukraine.
