= Dachnów =

Dachnów, Poland
- Village
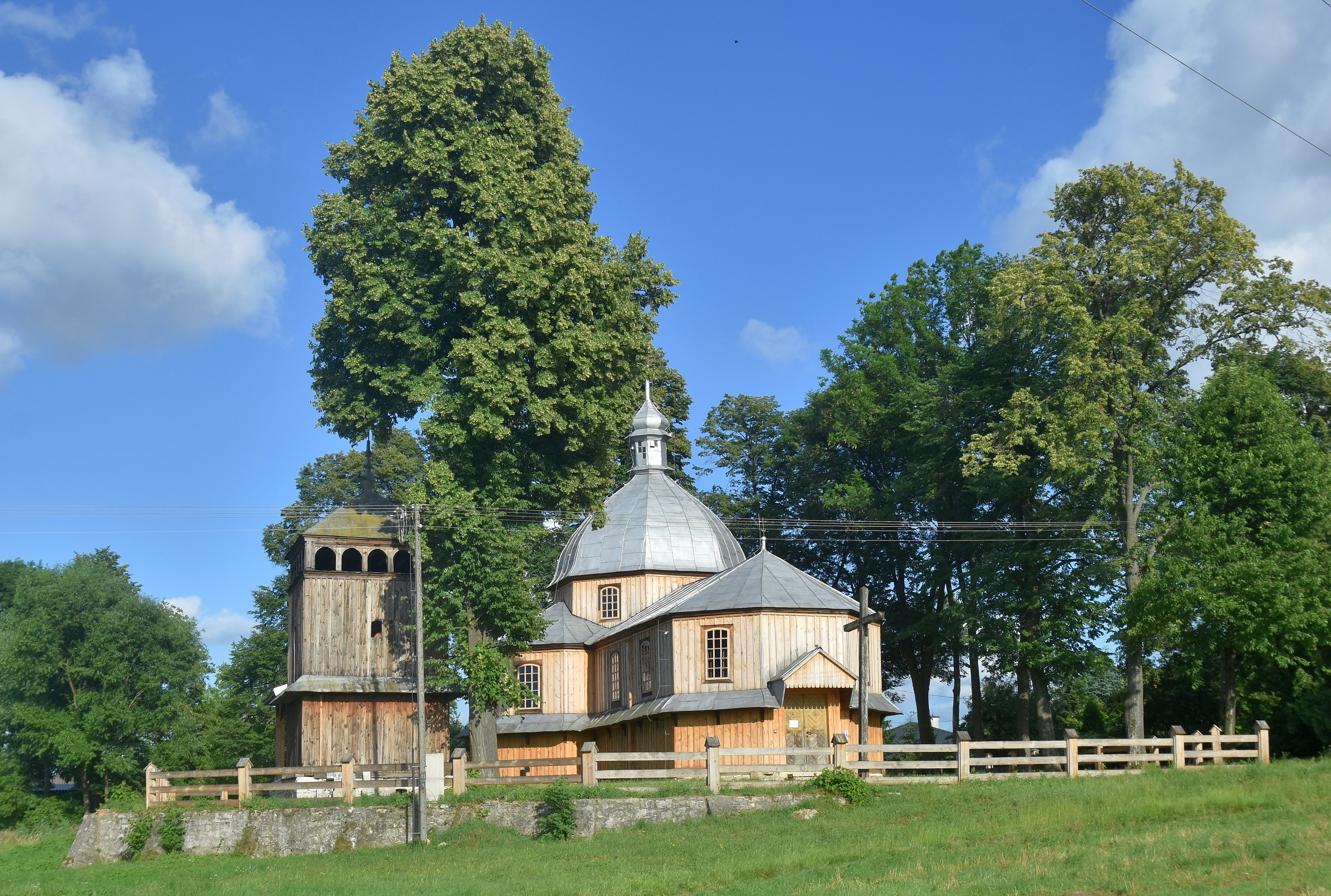
- Wooden church

- Location within Poland
- Coordinates: 50°12′N 23°7′E
- Country: Poland
- Voivodeship: Subcarpathian
- County: Lubaczów
- Gmina: Cieszanów

Dachnów [ˈdaxnuf] is a village in the administrative district of Gmina Cieszanów, within Lubaczów County, Subcarpathian Voivodeship, in south-eastern Poland.
