= Borowa Góra, Podkarpackie Voivodeship =

Borowa Góra
- Village
- Location within Poland
- Coordinates: 50°8′56″N 23°12′45″E
- Country: Poland
- Voivodeship: Subcarpathian
- County: Lubaczów
- Gmina: Lubaczów
- Population: 239

Borowa Góra [bɔˈrɔva ˈɡura] is a village in the administrative district of Gmina Lubaczów, within Lubaczów County, Subcarpathian Voivodeship, in south-eastern Poland, close to the border with Ukraine.
