= Stare Oleszyce =

- Village
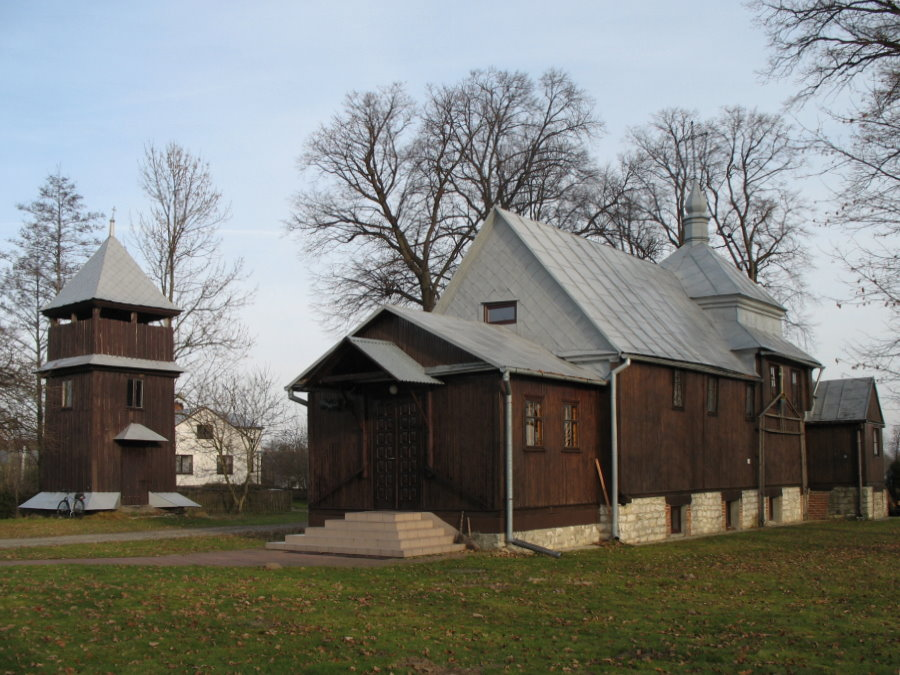
- Greek Catholic church

- Location within Poland
- Coordinates: 50°10′13″N 22°59′43″E
- Country: Poland
- Voivodeship: Subcarpathian
- County: Lubaczów
- Gmina: Oleszyce

Stare Oleszyce [ˈstarɛ ɔlɛˈʂɨt͡sɛ] is a village in the administrative district of Gmina Oleszyce, within Lubaczów County, Subcarpathian Voivodeship, in south-eastern Poland.
