= Piastowo, Podkarpackie Voivodeship =

Piastowo
- Village
- Location within Poland
- Coordinates: 50°10′21″N 23°12′1″E
- Country: Poland
- Voivodeship: Subcarpathian
- County: Lubaczów
- Gmina: Lubaczów
- Population: 185

Piastowo [pʲasˈtɔvɔ] is a village in the administrative district of Gmina Lubaczów, within Lubaczów County in the Subcarpathian Voivodeship. It is in south-eastern Poland, near the border of Ukraine. Piastowo lies approximately 6 km (4 mi) east of Lubaczów and 87 km (54 mi) east of the regional capital Rzeszów.
