= Dąbrówka, Lubaczów County =

Dąbrówka
- Village
- Location within Poland
- Coordinates: 50°15′N 23°13′E
- Country: Poland
- Voivodeship: Subcarpathian
- County: Lubaczów
- Gmina: Cieszanów

Dąbrówka [dɔmˈbrufka] is a village in the administrative district of Gmina Cieszanów, within Lubaczów County, Subcarpathian Voivodeship, in south-eastern Poland.
