= Niemstów =

Niemstów may refer to the following places in Poland:

- Niemstów, Lower Silesian Voivodeship (south-west Poland)
- Niemstów, Subcarpathian Voivodeship (south-east Poland)
