= Gorajec =

- Village
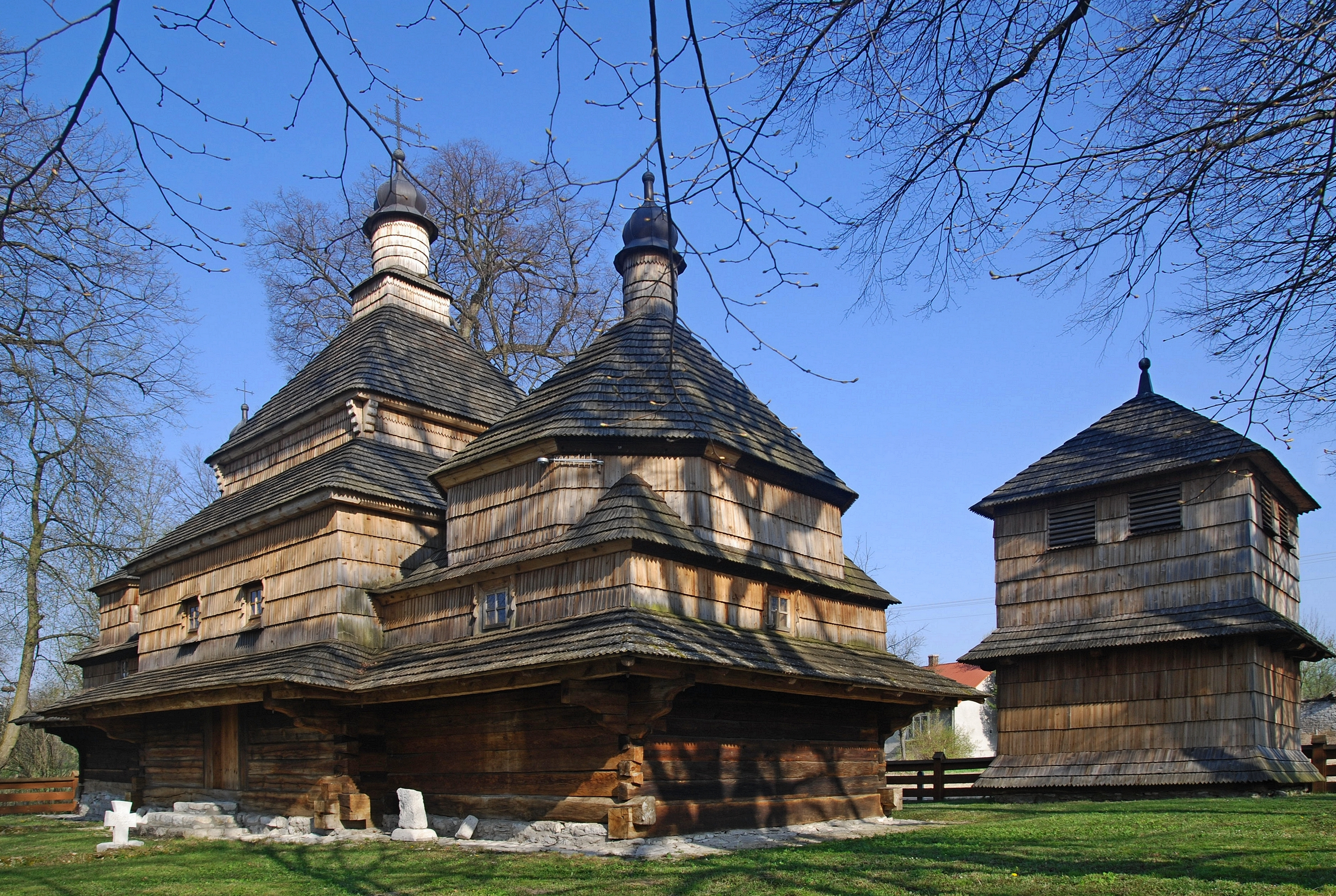
- Former Greek Catholic church. Currently Roman Catholic church of the Birth of the Virgin Mary

- Location within Poland
- Coordinates: 50°16′9″N 23°12′16″E
- Country: Poland
- Voivodeship: Subcarpathian
- County: Lubaczów
- Gmina: Cieszanów
- Population: 140

Gorajec [ɡɔˈrajɛt͡s] is a village in the administrative district of Gmina Cieszanów, within Lubaczów County, Subcarpathian, in south-eastern Poland.

The village has a population of 140.
