= Stare Sioło =

- Village
- Location within Poland
- Coordinates: 50°9′N 22°58′E
- Country: Poland
- Voivodeship: Subcarpathian
- County: Lubaczów
- Gmina: Oleszyce
- Population: 450

Stare Sioło [ˈstarɛ ˈɕɔwɔ] is a village in the administrative district of Gmina Oleszyce, within Lubaczów County, Subcarpathian Voivodeship, in south-eastern Poland.
