= Folwarki, Podkarpackie Voivodeship =

Folwarki
- Village
- Location within Poland
- Coordinates: 50°15′2″N 23°4′47″E
- Country: Poland
- Voivodeship: Subcarpathian
- County: Lubaczów
- Gmina: Cieszanów

Folwarki [fɔlˈvarkʲi] is a village in the administrative district of Gmina Cieszanów, within Lubaczów County, Subcarpathian Voivodeship, in south-eastern Poland.
