= Nowa Grobla =

- Village
- Location within Poland
- Coordinates: 50°4′N 23°0′E
- Country: Poland
- Voivodeship: Subcarpathian
- County: Lubaczów
- Gmina: Oleszyce

Nowa Grobla [ˈnɔva ˈɡrɔbla] is a village in the administrative district of Gmina Oleszyce, within Lubaczów County, Subcarpathian Voivodeship, in south-eastern Poland.
