= Nowe Sioło =

- Village
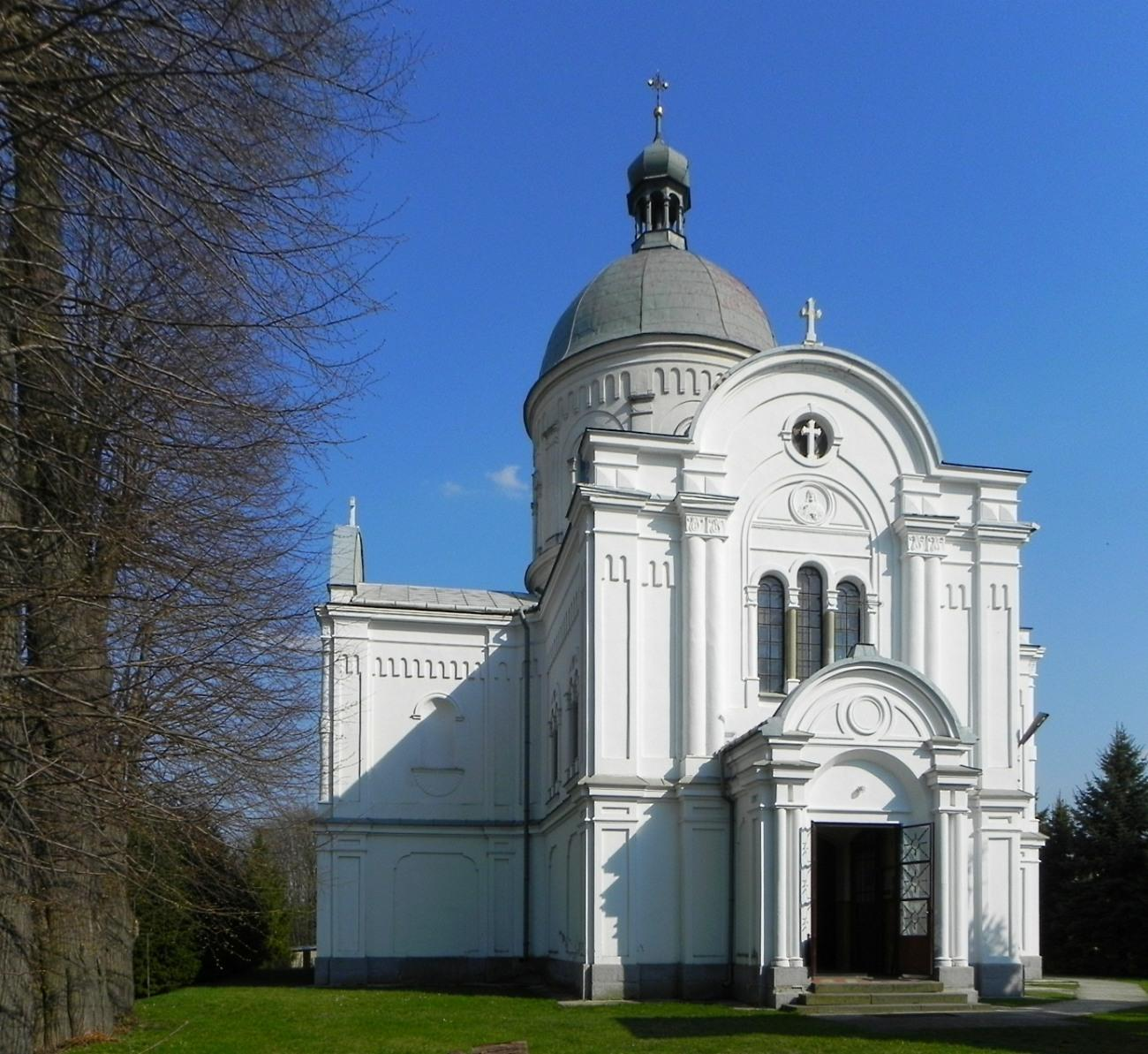
- Former Greek Catholic church of the Prophet Elijah. Currently Roman Catholic church of the Assumption of the Virgin Mary.

- Location within Poland
- Coordinates: 50°13′N 23°9′E
- Country: Poland
- Voivodeship: Subcarpathian
- County: Lubaczów
- Gmina: Cieszanów
- Population: 1,300

Nowe Sioło [ˈnɔvɛ ˈɕɔwɔ] is a village in the administrative district of Gmina Cieszanów, within Lubaczów County, Subcarpathian Voivodeship, in south-eastern Poland.
