= Gmina Lubaczów =

Gmina Lubaczów Lubaczów Commune
- Gmina
- Flag Coat of arms
- Interactive map of Gmina Lubaczów
- Coordinates (Lubaczów): 50°10′N 23°7′E
- Country: Poland
- Voivodeship: Subcarpathian
- County: Lubaczów
- Seat: Lubaczów

Area
  - Total: 202.86 km^{2} (78.32 sq mi)

Population (2013)
  - Total: 9,118
  - Density: 44.95/km^{2} (116.4/sq mi)
- Website: http://www.lubaczow.com.pl/

Gmina Lubaczów is a rural gmina (administrative district) in Lubaczów County, Subcarpathian Voivodeship, in south-eastern Poland, on the border with Ukraine. Its seat is the town of Lubaczów, although the town is not part of the territory of the gmina.

The gmina covers an area of 202.86 square kilometres (78.3 sq mi), and as of 2006 its total population is 9,133 (9,118 in 2013). The largest communities in Gmina Lubaczów are Lisie Jamy and Basznia Dolna.

== Villages ==
Gmina Lubaczów contains the villages and settlements of Antoniki, Bałaje, Basznia Dolna, Basznia Górna, Borowa Góra, Budomierz, Dąbków, Dąbrowa, Hurcze, Huta Kryształowa, Karolówka, Krowica Hołodowska, Krowica Lasowa, Krowica Sama, Lisie Jamy, Młodów, Mokrzyca, Opaka, Piastowo, Podlesie, Szczutków, Tymce, Wólka Krowicka and Załuże.

== Neighbouring gminas ==
Gmina Lubaczów is bordered by the town of Lubaczów and by the gmina of Horyniec-Zdrój. It also borders Ukraine.
