= Budomierz =

- Village
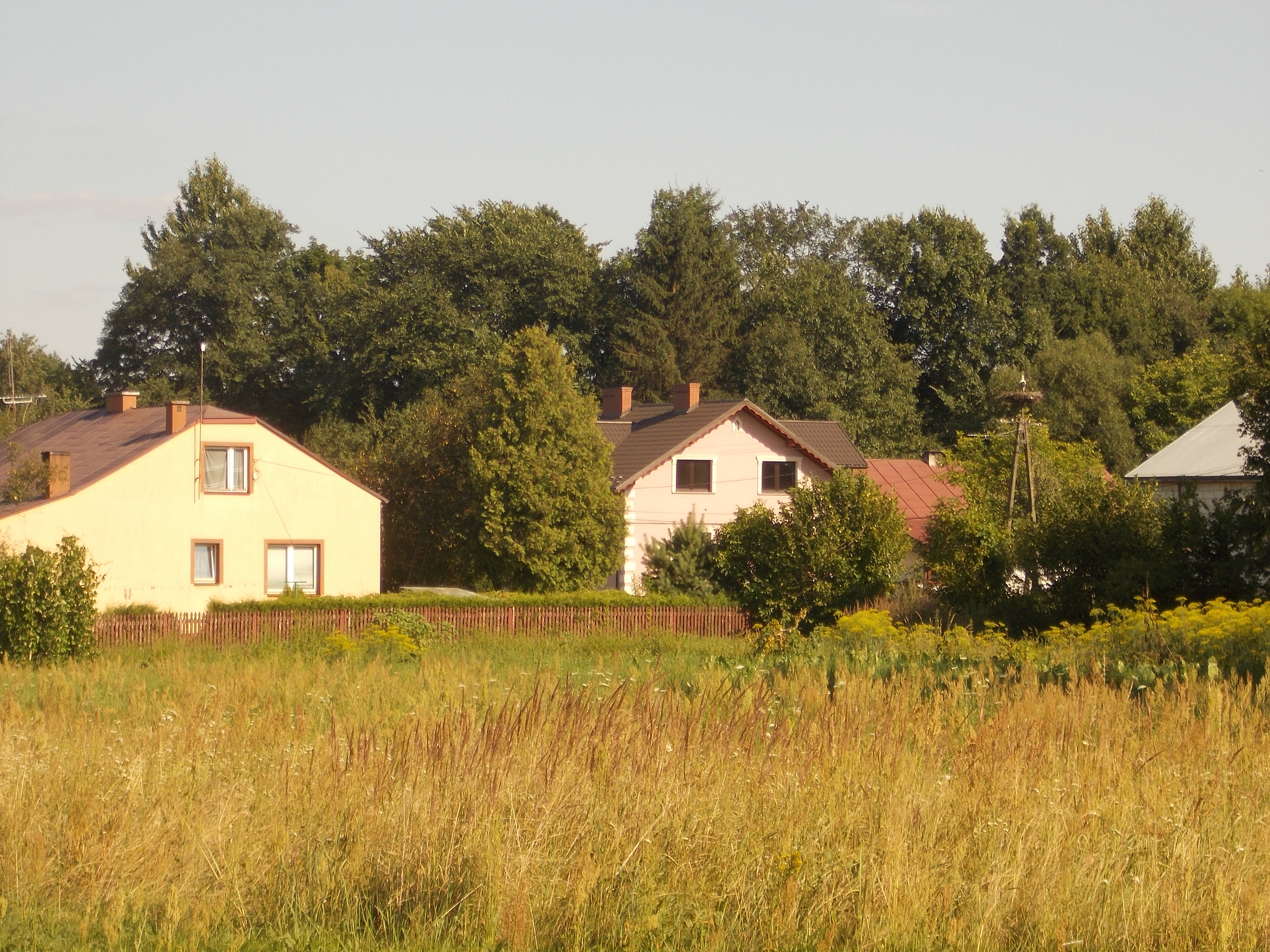
- Interactive map of Budomierz
- Location within Poland
- Coordinates: 50°6′1″N 23°16′27″E
- Country: Poland
- Voivodeship: Subcarpathian
- County: Lubaczów
- Gmina: Lubaczów
- Population: 106
- Time zone: UTC+1 (CET)
  - Summer (DST): UTC+2 (CEST)
- Vehicle registration: RLU

Budomierz [buˈdɔmʲɛʂ] is a village in the administrative district of Gmina Lubaczów, within Lubaczów County, Subcarpathian Voivodeship, in south-eastern Poland, close to the border with Ukraine.
