= Gmina Oleszyce =

Gmina Oleszyce Oleszyce Commune
- Gmina
- Coat of arms
- Interactive map of Gmina Oleszyce
- Coordinates (Oleszyce): 50°10′1″N 23°1′51″E
- Country: Poland
- Voivodeship: Subcarpathian
- County: Lubaczów
- Seat: Oleszyce

Area
  - Total: 151.82 km^{2} (58.62 sq mi)

Population (2013)
  - Total: 6,418
  - Density: 42.27/km^{2} (109.5/sq mi)
  - Urban: 3,053
  - Rural: 3,365
- Website: http://oleszyce.pl/

Gmina Oleszyce is an urban-rural gmina (administrative district) in Lubaczów County, Subcarpathian Voivodeship, in south-eastern Poland. Its seat is the town of Oleszyce, which lies approximately 7 kilometres (4 mi) west of Lubaczów and 75 km (47 mi) east of the regional capital Rzeszów.

The gmina covers an area of 151.82 square kilometres (58.6 sq mi), and as of 2006 its total population is 6,562 (out of which the population of Oleszyce amounts to 3,168, and the population of the rural part of the gmina is 3,394).

== Villages ==
Apart from the town of Oleszyce, Gmina Oleszyce contains the villages and settlements of Borchów, Futory, Nowa Grobla, Stare Oleszyce and Stare Sioło.

== Neighbouring gminas ==
Gmina Oleszyce is bordered by the gminas of Laszki and Wiązownica.
