= Gmina Cieszanów =

Gmina Cieszanów Cieszanów Commune
- Gmina
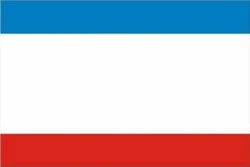
- Flag Coat of arms
- Interactive map of Gmina Cieszanów
- Coordinates (Cieszanów): 50°16′N 23°8′E
- Country: Poland
- Voivodeship: Subcarpathian
- County: Lubaczów
- Seat: Cieszanów

Area
  - Total: 219.35 km^{2} (84.69 sq mi)

Population (2013)
  - Total: 7,516
  - Density: 34.26/km^{2} (88.75/sq mi)
  - Urban: 1,975
  - Rural: 5,541

Gmina Cieszanów is an urban-rural gmina (administrative district) in Lubaczów County, Subcarpathian Voivodeship, in south-eastern Poland. Its seat is the town of Cieszanów, which lies approximately 12 kilometres (7 mi) north of Lubaczów and 85 km (53 mi) east of the regional capital Rzeszów.

The gmina covers an area of 219.35 square kilometres (84.7 sq mi), and as of 2006 its total population is 7,258 (out of which the population of Cieszanów amounts to 1,899, and the population of the rural part of the gmina is 5,359).

The gmina contains part of the protected area called Puszcza Solska Landscape Park.

== Villages ==
Apart from the town of Cieszanów, Gmina Cieszanów contains the villages and settlements of Chotylub, Dąbrówka, Dachnów, Folwarki, Gorajec, Kowalówka, Niemstów, Nowe Sioło, Nowy Lubliniec, Stary Lubliniec and Żuków.

== Neighbouring gminas ==
Gmina Cieszanów is bordered by the gminas of Horyniec-Zdrój and Obsza.
