= Wólka Krowicka =

- Village
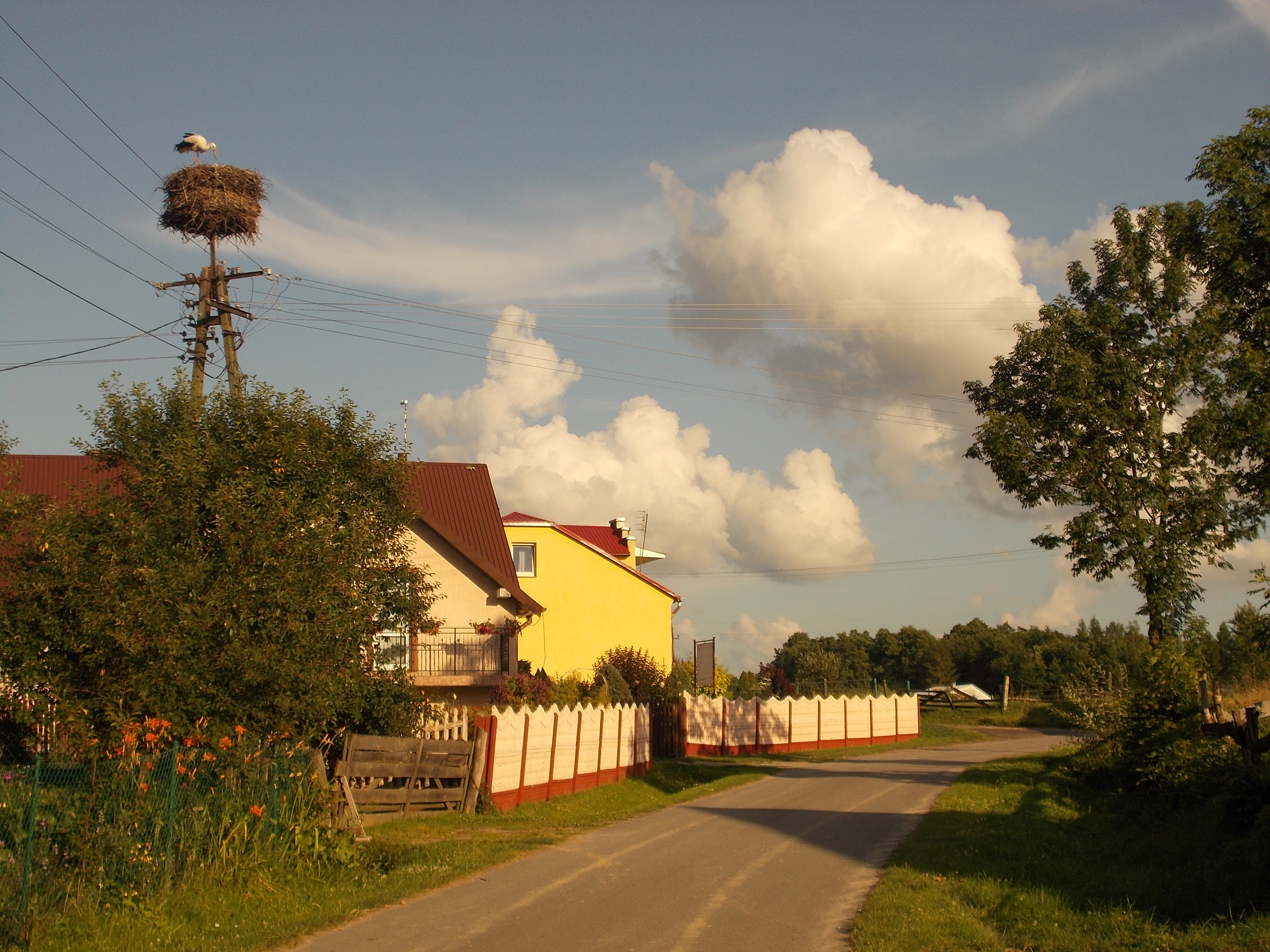

- Location within Poland
- Coordinates: 50°7′33″N 23°11′29″E
- Country: Poland
- Voivodeship: Subcarpathian
- County: Lubaczów
- Gmina: Lubaczów
- Population: 420

Wólka Krowicka [ˈvulka krɔˈvʲit͡ska] is a village in the administrative district of Gmina Lubaczów, within Lubaczów County, Subcarpathian Voivodeship, in south-eastern Poland, close to the border with Ukraine.
