= Niemstów, Podkarpackie Voivodeship =

Niemstów
- Village
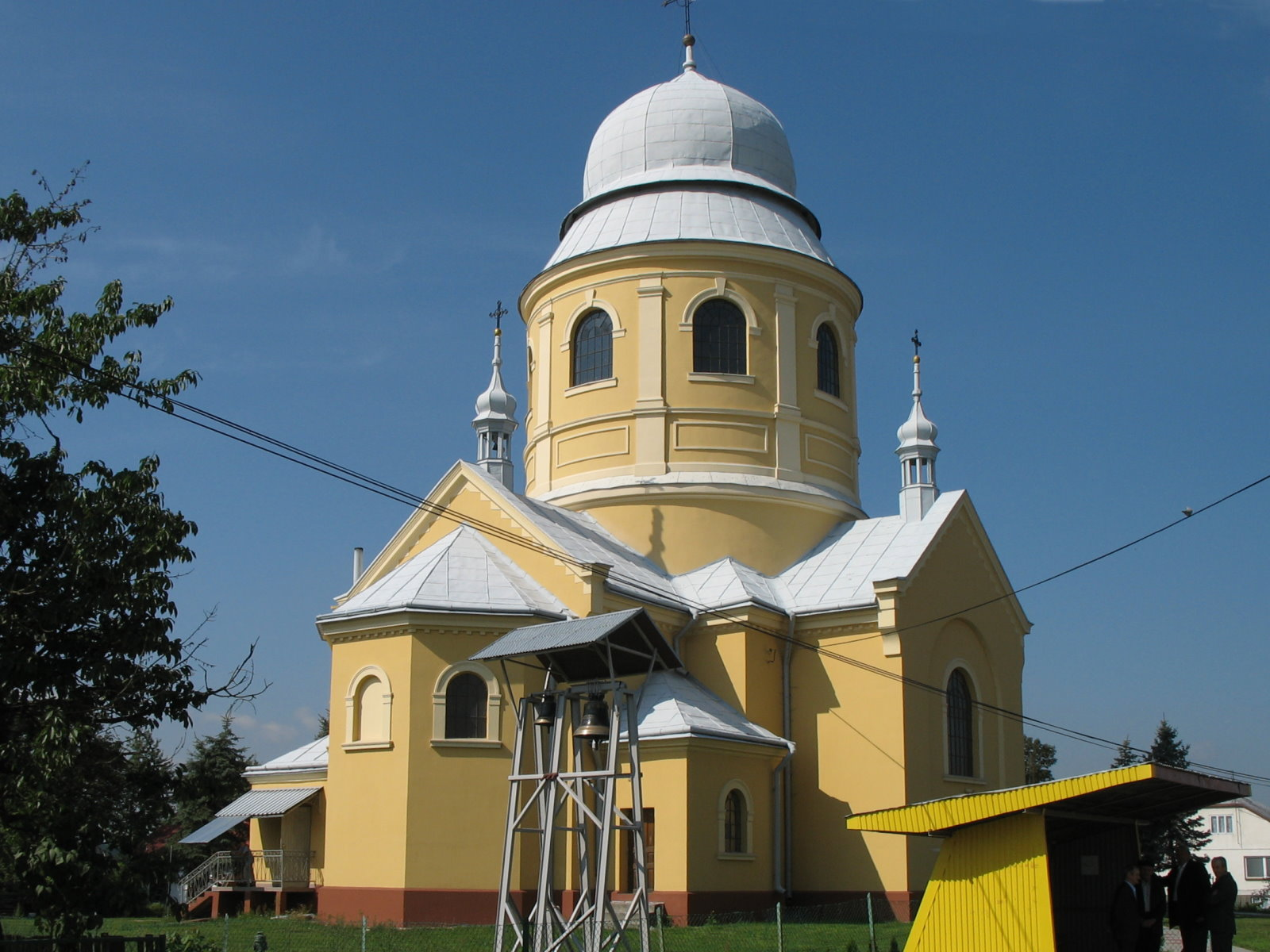
- Former Greek Catholic church. Nowadays a Roman Catholic Church of the Birth of the Virgin Mary.

- Location within Poland
- Coordinates: 50°15′N 23°3′E
- Country: Poland
- Voivodeship: Subcarpathian
- County: Lubaczów
- Gmina: Cieszanów
- Population: 530

Niemstów [ˈɲɛmstuf] is a village in the administrative district of Gmina Cieszanów, within Lubaczów County, Subcarpathian Voivodeship, in south-eastern Poland.
