= Canadian Medical Assistance Teams =

Canadian disaster relief organization and Emergency Medical Team

Canadian Medical Assistance Teams (CMAT)
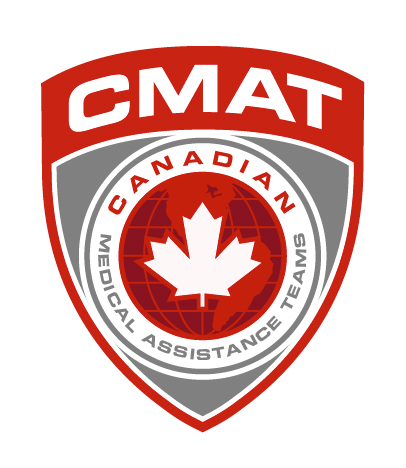
- Founded: 2005
- Type: Disaster response; emergency management; charitable organization
- VAT ID no.: Canadian Charitable Registration #88439 3315 RR0001
- Purpose: Disasters, Medical, Primary Health Care, Humanitarian aid, Development and Recovery
- Location: PO Box 35055 Ellerbeck Station, Toronto, Ontario, M4K 3P5 Canada
- Region served: Canada and International
- Method: Medical, Major Trauma, Primary Health Care, Maternal/ Newborn
- Key people: Board Chair; Dr. Anthony Fong, MD (Vancouver, BC); Vice Chair; Dr. Sarah Scott, MD (Comox, BC); Director Emeritus; Valerie Rzepka, NP (Toronto, ON); Director of Communications; Brandon Duncan, RN (London, ON); Treasurer/ Secretary; Scott Haig, PCP, (Vancouver, BC); Director of Logistics; Keith Moody (Ottawa, ON); Director of Operations; Michelle Kerr, RN (Ottawa, ON) '
- Employees: 0
- Volunteers: 1000+
- Website: www.cmat.ca

Canadian Medical Assistance Teams (CMAT) is a Canadian grassroots, non profit disaster relief organization based in Vancouver, British Columbia, Canada. Through its medical relief and development projects, CMAT seeks to improve the health and welfare of families both in Canada and in developing countries around the world.

== History ==
Canadian Medical Assistance Teams was established in 2004 in response to the 2004 Indian Ocean earthquake and tsunami as the medical arm of Canadian Relief Foundation. Two teams of paramedics from British Columbia and Saskatchewan were deployed to Banda Aceh, Indonesia to provide medical aid to the victims of the disaster. With lessons learned in Indonesia, CMAT prepared for further deployments.

== Deployments ==
CMAT has a database of over 1000 health professionals from across Canada, one of its strengths is the ability to be flexible. CMAT is firmly dedicated to building capacity in the communities provided with assistance, and so any project which is initiated will only be in direct partnership with local authorities and with the support, guidance and permission of the host government.

=== 2004 Indian Ocean earthquake and tsunami ===
The 2004 Indian Ocean earthquake and tsunami was the first time CMAT sent medical teams overseas. Over the course of eight weeks, three Canadian medical teams consisting of paramedics and physicians were deployed to Indonesia, with the first team deploying within 10 days of disaster. CMAT's medical team worked alongside teams from Mercy Malaysia and collaborated with Canadian consular officials from Jakarta, Indonesia and Kuala Lumpur, Malaysia to establish medical stations and administer medical care and first aid to displaced persons in Medan, Banda Aceh, and Meuloboh, Indonesia.

=== 2005 Hurricane Katrina ===
On August 29, 2005, the Category 5 Hurricane Katrina made landfall in southeast Louisiana. It caused severe destruction along the Gulf coast from central Florida to Texas, much of it due to the storm surge. CMAT deployed an assessment team to Baton Rouge, Louisiana. After three days in the Area of Operations (AOO) and completion of an on-ground tactical assessment, it was determined that CMAT's trauma team of physicians, trauma nurses and flight paramedics should not be deployed to the area. The two-member assessment team cited significant political infighting and substantial lack of command and control structure, which together posed serious problems for logistical support and basic information.

=== 2005 Kashmir earthquake ===
On October 8, 2005, a major earthquake registered a moment magnitude of 7.6 in Azad Kashmir, near the city of Muzaffarabad in Pakistan. Occurring at 08:52:37 Pakistan Standard Time, it registered a moment magnitude of 7.6 The disaster destroyed 50% of the buildings in Muzaffarabad (including most of the official buildings) and is estimated to have killed up to 80,000 people in the Pakistani-controlled areas of Kashmir, alone. The severity of the damage caused by the earthquake is attributed to severe upthrust, coupled with poor construction.

CMAT focused its efforts in northern Pakistan, initially in Bagh and Muzaffarabad areas sending an assessment team from Canada on October 10, consisting of search and rescue, logistics and paramedics, as well as an emergency physician. In addition, CMAT's staff in Kabul, Afghanistan conducted an assessment in affected areas in eastern Afghanistan.

This initial assessment team was followed by ten rotations of teams every three weeks, the second of which departed on October 21, 2005. The teams initially worked alongside members of the Rotary Club of Islamabad and Rawalpindi to deliver emergency medical relief, and assist and support medical staff at hospitals in Islamabad and Rawalpindi which had been deluged with quake victims airlifted from the field. Subsequent teams were stationed in Muzaffarabad, working out of Abbass hospital, and in collaboration with the US Army's 212th Mobile Army Surgical Hospital (MASH) Hospital, and in Garhi Dopatta, working with the Canadian Forces Disaster Assistance Response Team (DART) Team, and United Nations Health Cluster.

On November 3, 2005, CMAT announced that it has been awarded over $190,000 in funding for two of its projects as part of the fund matching program through the Canadian International Development Agency (CIDA). The funds were sent to support medical teams in Muzzafferabad and other quake devastated areas.

=== 2007 South Asian floods ===
The 2007 South Asian floods were a series of floods in India, Nepal, Bhutan, Pakistan and Bangladesh. News Agencies, citing the Indian and Bangladeshi governments, placed the death toll in excess of 2,000. By 3 August approximately 20 million had been displaced and by 10 August some 30 million people in India, Bangladesh and Nepal had been affected by flooding.

CMAT deployed a 2-member assessment team to Dhaka, Bangladesh to meet its local partner on August 18, 2007. According to CMAT assessment team, doctors and nurses were overwhelmed at the International Centre for Diarrhoeal Disease Research, Bangladesh hospital, as over 1800 patients were being seen every 24 hours with acute GI distress, typhoid, skin and eye infections and severe dehydration with outside temperatures reaching 33 degrees Celsius.

A four-member team consisting of advanced care paramedics and a nurse practitioner were deployed to Bangladesh, in collaboration with a local partner Fazlullah Foundation, and spent three weeks providing medical relief in Gopalganj District (Bangladesh), one of the most flood affected areas in Bangladesh alongside the Bangladesh Auxiliary Services for Social Advancement (BASSA).

=== 2008 Sichuan earthquake, China ===
CMAT deployed their assessment team to the province of Sichuan in China, where an earthquake measuring 7.8 on the Richter scale occurred on May 12, 2008 at approximately 14:00 local time. Reports indicated over 68,000 people died, including many school children trapped in collapsed school buildings.

The assessment team conducted an in-depth assessment of the region, partnering with contacts on the ground, and advised that the Chinese government, military and local Red Cross had done a commendable job in the rescue and recovery effort. With over 100,000 Chinese Military and over 1000 medical staff in the region, the most seriously injured citizens had already been evacuated to larger centres. CMAT's offer of providing medical teams to the area was declined by Government officials, and it was on their advice that CMAT has decided to immediately shift the focus of the relief effort in China. CMAT investigated other projects which were completed with donor funding.

In 2010, CMAT Chair visited the temporary home of the Mianyang Youxian District Special Education School, and presented a cheque for ¥85,000 (approx $12,500 CAD).

=== 2010 Haiti earthquake, Haiti ===
A magnitude 7.0 quake with countless aftershocks struck the island nation of Haïti on January 12, 2010. Nearly 300,000 people perished in the highly populated Caribbean nation, and an assessment team was immediately deployed to the impoverished nation. The earthquake, centered 15 km from the capitol of Port-au-Prince caused tremendous devastation to vast areas of the country.

CMAT's initial assessment team conducted intense reconnaissance in the capitol and in the environs, meeting with United Nations officials, and other partner organizations. In collaboration with Canadian Armed Forces, CMAT based its field hospital operation in the city of Léogâne, approximately 35 southwest from Port-au-Prince.

Over the course of two months, CMAT's medical volunteers assessed and treated over 10,000 patients, performed hundreds of surgeries, and delivered approximately 20 babies. In March 2010, CMAT wrapped up its operations in Léogâne, and transitioned its medical teams to Pétion-Ville, working in partnership with J/P Haitian Relief Organization, a non-governmental organization founded by actor Sean Penn. Teams of volunteers rotated through an additional four months.

In partnership with the York Region District School Board, approximately $75,000 was raised directly for CMAT's relief effort.

=== 2010 Chile earthquake ===
A powerful 8.8 magnitude quake and ensuing tsunamis struck the area on February 27, 2010. Over 700 people were confirmed dead, and countless others were injured.

In response to the Chilean government's international appeal for aid, Canadian Medical Assistance Teams deployed its initial disaster assessment team to Concepción, Chile to conduct a needs assessment and ascertain the level of devastation, destroyed infrastructure and health needs of the quake affected people.

After meeting with Chilean officials, in Concepción, the decision was made stand down deployment. This decision was made as a direct result of the Chilean Government and Military's exceptional response to the earthquake.

The assessment team found that the need for medical aid was decreasing on a daily basis, any victims with traumatic injuries had been evacuated to major medical centres in other regions of the country, and thus the recommendation to stand down was made.

=== 2010 Pakistan floods ===
In the late summer of 2010, major flooding from monsoon rains killed up to 1,500 people, put over 100,000 at risk for disease and displaced more than 3.2 million in central Pakistan. The threat of water-borne diseases rapidly rose and millions of people were homeless or cut off in their villages because of the heavy monsoon rains and flooding.

CMAT received word from its Pakistani partners on the ground, reporting that rescue workers are struggling to aid the millions of people affected, especially those in remote villages. CMAT members were familiar with the region, having responded and provided medical relief after the devastating earthquake of October, 2005.

As floodwaters moved through Sindh Province, additional flooding occurred in low-lying areas, and the incidence of disease swiftly increased. Canadian Medical Assistance Teams deployed its initial disaster assessment team to Sindh Province, Pakistan in September, 2010. The assessment surveyed the health needs of displaced flood victims in order to prepare for the deployment of CMAT's medical teams. The five member team begun its assessment of the southern part of Sindh Province, worked in the town of Thatta. The town was one of the worst flooded districts of Pakistan, as the sea was on high tide when flooded river water reached it, multiplying the damage drastically. By late August, 175,000 people had left their homes and were camping along the sides of the main road under the open sky.

Three primary health care teams were sent to Sindh province, and indicated that the majority of illnesses were primary care related - such as skin infections, respiratory infections, eye infections, and gastrointestinal illnesses. CMAT also provided mobile medical clinics to the outlying areas, to target women and children who would otherwise be unable to access health services. In collaboration with Pakistani Federal and Provincial authorities, and other NGO partners on the ground, the team also identified an area in Sukkur, Sindh Province, approximately 500km north of Karachi. CMAT volunteers treated more than 500 patients per week in the field clinic in collaboration with local partner V Need U.

=== 2011 Tōhoku earthquake and tsunami, Japan ===
The largest earthquake in Japan's recorded history struck offshore on March 11, and police found as many as 300 bodies in the north-eastern coastal area that bore the brunt of the tremors and ensuing tsunami. The earthquake struck at 2:46p.m. local time at a depth of 10 kilometres about 125 kilometres off the eastern coast, and was followed by at least 19 powerful aftershocks.

CMAT's Rapid Assessment Team was activated, and conducted a needs assessment in the Miyagi Prefecture, around the city of Sendai to ascertain the level of devastation. This assessment included evaluating the destroyed infrastructure and surveying the health needs of the earthquake and tsunami affected victims in order to prepare for the potential deployment of CMAT's inflatable field hospital.

NGO airlift support had been temporarily suspended pending the further assessment of the situation at the Fukushima Nuclear Plant. CMAT Directors consulted with Canadian Nuclear Officials who were confident that only small amounts of radioactive material were released from Fukushima Nuclear Power Plant in Japan, and in a controlled manner.

CMAT sent medical volunteers who were trained in CBRNE (chemical, biological, radiological, nuclear and explosive) events.

The team made their way to Ishinomaki, experiencing several aftershocks ranging from 5.0 to 6.6. A 5-member strike team collaborated with the Japanese military in the coastal town of Onagawa, approximately 15km east of Ishinomaki and were asked to assist with the search and recovery of victims in this small community which was flattened by the tsunami. The waves were well over 100 feet high and deposited debris into the branches of tall trees. Of the estimated 15,000 people who lived in this community before the tsunami, only about 300 survived the disaster.

The team also facilitated delivery of a large water purification unit in collaboration with the Japanese military, and the decision was made to place the unit in the community of Kitakamicho Aikawa, a small fishing village of about 1000 people, which was completely destroyed by the tsunami. The unit supplied the whole community with safe drinking water as the water reservoir and most of the water supply infrastructure was washed away in the tsunami.

=== 2013 Typhoon Haiyan/ Yolanda, Leyte and Samar, Philippines ===
Following the devastation caused by Typhoon Haiyan (locally known as Yolanda) in the Philippines in November 2013, Canadian Medical Assistance Teams (CMAT) deployed a disaster assessment team followed by a medical team to support affected communities. Working primarily in Leyte province, including the city of Ormoc, CMAT volunteers established mobile medical clinics and provided primary health care to communities where local health infrastructure had been severely damaged. Over the course of approximately one month, the team, composed of Canadian primary health care physicians, nurse practitioners, nurses, and paramedics, treated nearly 2,000 patients and assisted with broader recovery needs such as public health surveillance, and mental health and psychosocial support assessments.

=== 2015 Nepal Earthquake ===
CMAT deployed multiple volunteer teams to Nepal following the 2015 Nepal earthquake. An initial assessment team arrived in April 2015 and conducted surveys of the heavily affected Gorkha District region and surrounding rural villages to determine health needs and infrastructure damage. Working in coordination with the World Health Organization-led Health Cluster, CMAT personnel were tasked with conducting rapid health surveillance in remote communities and establishing clinical services for earthquake-affected populations.

Subsequent rotations of multidisciplinary medical volunteers including physicians, nurses, paramedics, and logisticians operated field clinics in villages such as Baluwa and surrounding mountain communities. Teams provided primary health care, treated injuries and common illnesses, conducted maternal and child health assessments, and trekked to isolated settlements that had limited access to medical services after the earthquake. CMAT also worked with local health authorities and community health volunteers to support psychosocial care and public-health outreach.

They also assisted with the rescue of Canadian yoga teacher Tamara McLeod.

=== 2020 COVID-19 Pandemic Support - Toronto ===
During the early stages of the COVID-19 pandemic in 2020, the Canadian Medical Assistance Teams (CMAT) undertook domestic support activities in Toronto to assist frontline healthcare providers and health systems facing shortages of equipment and personnel. CMAT mobilized volunteers and resources to support pandemic preparedness and response efforts, including the donation and distribution of emergency personal protective equipment (PPE) stockpiles to healthcare workers and organizations responding to the outbreak.

=== 2020 Twin Hurricanes Eta and Iota, Honduras ===
In November 2020, CMAT deployed a collaborative Emergency Medical Team to San Pedro Sula, Honduras in response to the devastation caused by Hurricanes Eta and Iota, which struck Central America less than two weeks apart. The deployment was conducted in partnership with Humanity First Canada and coordinated with the Pan American Health Organization (PAHO) and the Honduran Ministry of Health.

A joint team of approximately ten volunteer health professionals and logisticians travelled from Canada to northern Honduras, establishing EMT Type 1 mobile clinics to provide primary health care and emergency medical services to flood-affected communities. The team operated mobile medical units serving rural and displaced populations around San Pedro Sula, delivering clinical care and conducting outreach visits in areas where access to health services had been disrupted by flooding and damaged infrastructure.

=== 2022 Ukraine Conflict and refugee crisis ===
Following the 2022 Russian invasion of Ukraine, CMAT mobilized volunteer health professionals to support the growing humanitarian crisis and refugee movements into Eastern Europe.

Beginning in March 2022, CMAT deployed multiple volunteer teams to the Poland–Ukraine border, where they operated primary care clinics and provided medical assistance to displaced civilians fleeing the conflict, in collaboration with Folkowisko and Polish Medical Mission.

Clinics at border points were held in shipping containers, and sites included (PL/UA): Korczowa/ Krakovts', Budomierz/ Hrushiv, Hrebenne/ Rava-Ruska, and Dorohusk/ Yagodyn.

Working in collaboration with partners including the Registered Nurses’ Association of Ontario (RNAO), Fundacja Folkowisko, Polish Medical Mission and other international humanitarian networks, CMAT volunteers delivered mobile primary health care for internally displaced persons - many of them women and children - while helping local health systems near Kovel and L'Viv manage the surge in medical needs. Over the course of approximately three months (March–June 2022), CMAT deployed eight teams to the region to provide surge medical capacity and humanitarian support to refugees and host communities affected by the war.

=== 2025 Hurricane Melissa, Jamaica ===
Following the landfall of Hurricane Melissa in Jamaica on 28 October 2025, the Canadian Medical Assistance Teams (CMAT) deployed volunteer medical personnel to support the country’s health system. The Category 5 hurricane caused widespread flooding, damage to health facilities, and disruption to water, electricity, and medical services across parts of western Jamaica.

In collaboration with Burnaby Urban Search and Rescue, CMAT arrived within the first 72 hours to assist rescue and early medical operations.

Coordinated by the Jamaican Ministry of Health and Wellness and the Pan American Health Organization (PAHO), the team established a field clinic adjacent to Cornwall Regional Hospital in Montego Bay to provide urgent primary care and help decompress the overwhelmed emergency department. CMAT clinicians treated patients with trauma, infections, chronic disease exacerbations, and other storm-related illnesses, while mobile teams supported affected rural communities.

=== 2026 Kashechewan First Nation - water crisis ===
In January 2026, Kashechewan First Nation declared a state of emergency after a failure at the community’s water treatment plant left residents without safe drinking water and contributed to a gastrointestinal illness outbreak. More than 1,900 residents were evacuated to several host communities across Ontario, including Kapuskasing, Timmins, Kingston, and Niagara Falls.

At the request of local leadership and health authorities, Canadian Medical Assistance Teams deployed volunteer clinicians to support the evacuation response in Kapuskasing. Beginning in mid-January 2026, CMAT established clinical rotations and provided primary health care services to evacuees, including medical assessments, treatment of acute and chronic conditions, and public-health support within host communities. Teams operated on rotational deployments over several weeks and worked in coordination with local partners and Indigenous health authorities to address the health needs of displaced residents.

== Educational opportunities ==
Sphere Project
