= Lubaczów County =

Lubaczów County Powiat lubaczowski
- County
- Flag Coat of arms

- Location within the voivodeship
- Coordinates (Lubaczów): 50°10′N 23°7′E
- Country: Poland
- Voivodeship: Subcarpathian
- Seat: Lubaczów
- Gminas: Total 8 (incl. 1 urban): Lubaczów; Gmina Cieszanów; Gmina Horyniec-Zdrój; Gmina Lubaczów; Gmina Narol; Gmina Oleszyce; Gmina Stary Dzików; Gmina Wielkie Oczy

Area
  - Total: 1,308.37 km^{2} (505.16 sq mi)

Population (2019)
  - Total: 55,438
  - Density: 42.372/km^{2} (109.74/sq mi)
  - Urban: 18,976
  - Rural: 36,462
- Car plates: RLU
- Website: powiatlubaczowski.pl

Lubaczów County (Polish: powiat lubaczowski) is a unit of territorial administration and local government (powiat) in Subcarpathian Voivodeship, south-eastern Poland, on the border with Ukraine. It came into being on January 1, 1999, as a result of the Polish local government reforms passed in 1998. Its administrative seat and largest town is Lubaczów, which lies 81 kilometres (50 mi) east of the regional capital Rzeszów. The county contains three other towns: Oleszyce, 7 km (4 mi) west of Lubaczów, Narol, 26 km (16 mi) north-east of Lubaczów, and Cieszanów, 12 km (7 mi) north of Lubaczów.

The county covers an area of 1,308.37 square kilometres (505.2 sq mi). As of 2019 its total population is 55,438, out of which the population of Lubaczów is 12,018, that of Oleszyce is 2,974, that of Narol is 2,071, that of Cieszanów is 1,913, and the rural population is 36,462.

== Neighbouring counties ==
Lubaczów County is bordered by Jarosław County and Przeworsk County to the west, Biłgoraj County to the north, and Tomaszów County to the north-east. It also borders Ukraine to the east.

== Administrative divisions ==
The county is subdivided into eight gminas (one urban, three urban-rural and four rural). These are listed in the following table, in descending order of population.

Gmina	Type	Area (km^{2})	Population (2019)	Seat
Lubaczów	urban	26.0	12,018	
Gmina Lubaczów	rural	202.9	9,182	Lubaczów *
Gmina Narol	urban-rural	203.6	8,040	Narol
Gmina Cieszanów	urban-rural	219.4	7,168	Cieszanów
Gmina Oleszyce	urban-rural	151.8	6,332	Oleszyce
Gmina Horyniec-Zdrój	rural	202.8	4,695	Horyniec-Zdrój
Gmina Stary Dzików	rural	155.8	4,193	Stary Dzików
Gmina Wielkie Oczy	rural	146.5	3,810	Wielkie Oczy
* seat not part of the gmina

== Rural landscape pictures ==
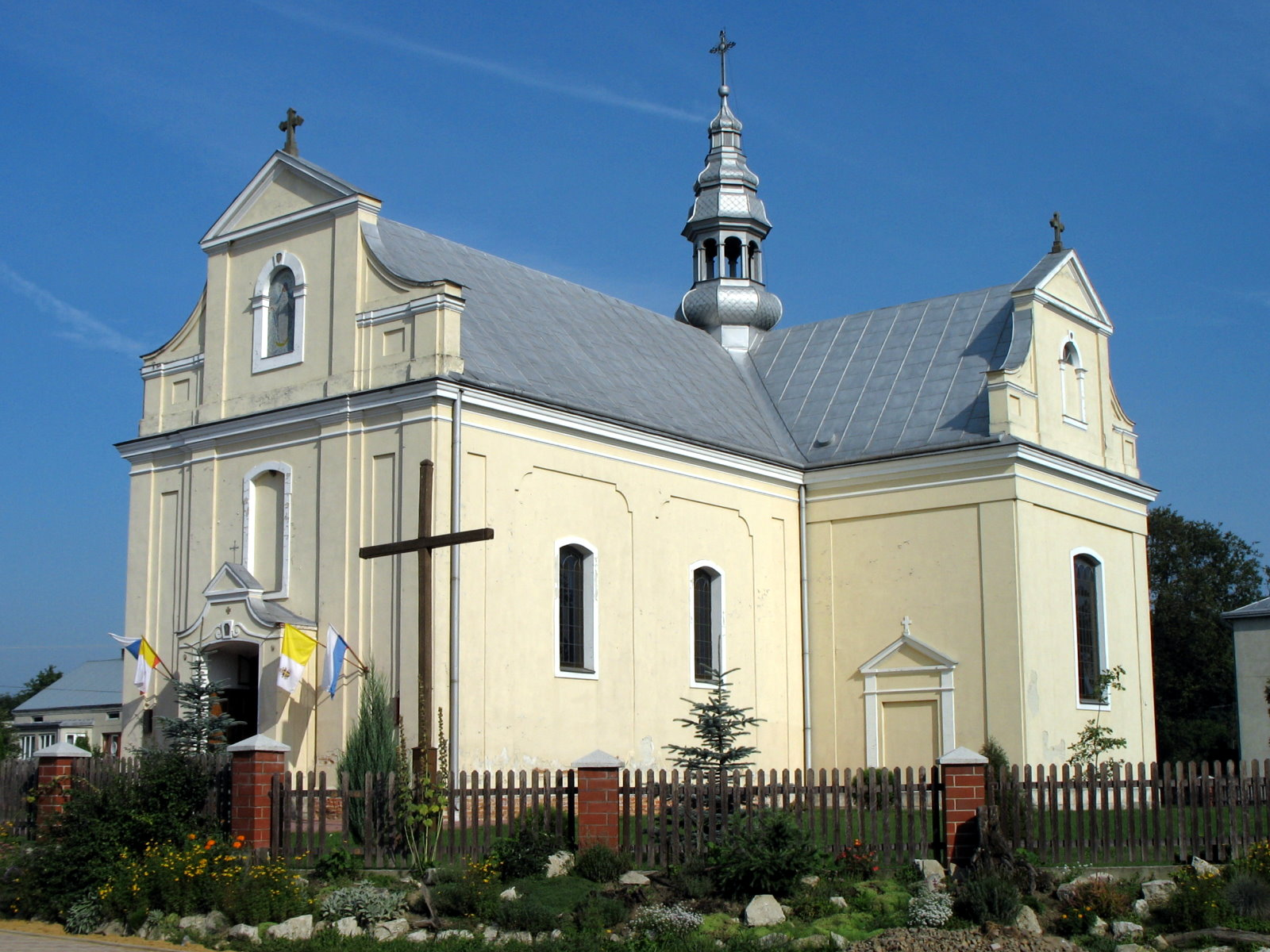

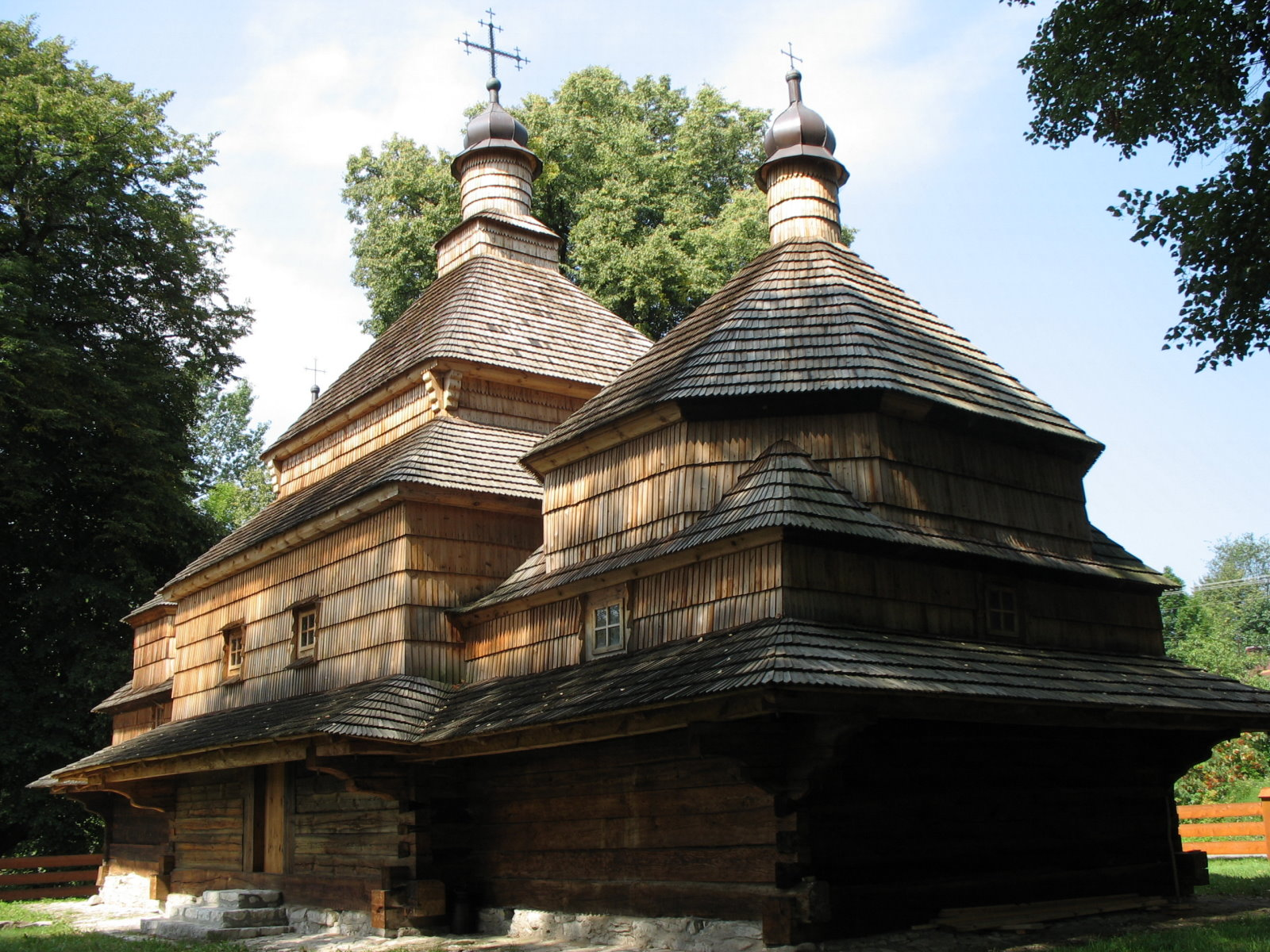

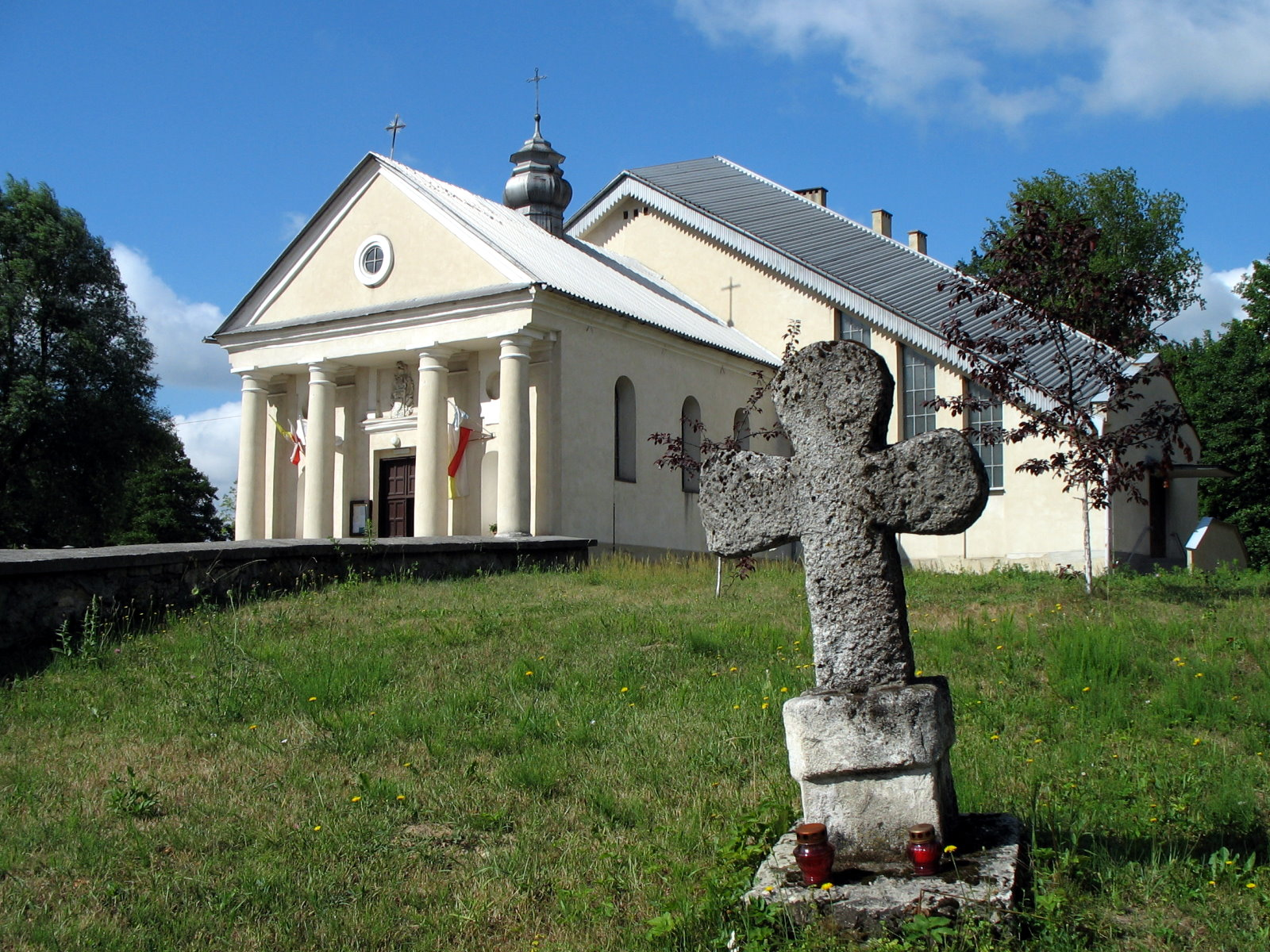

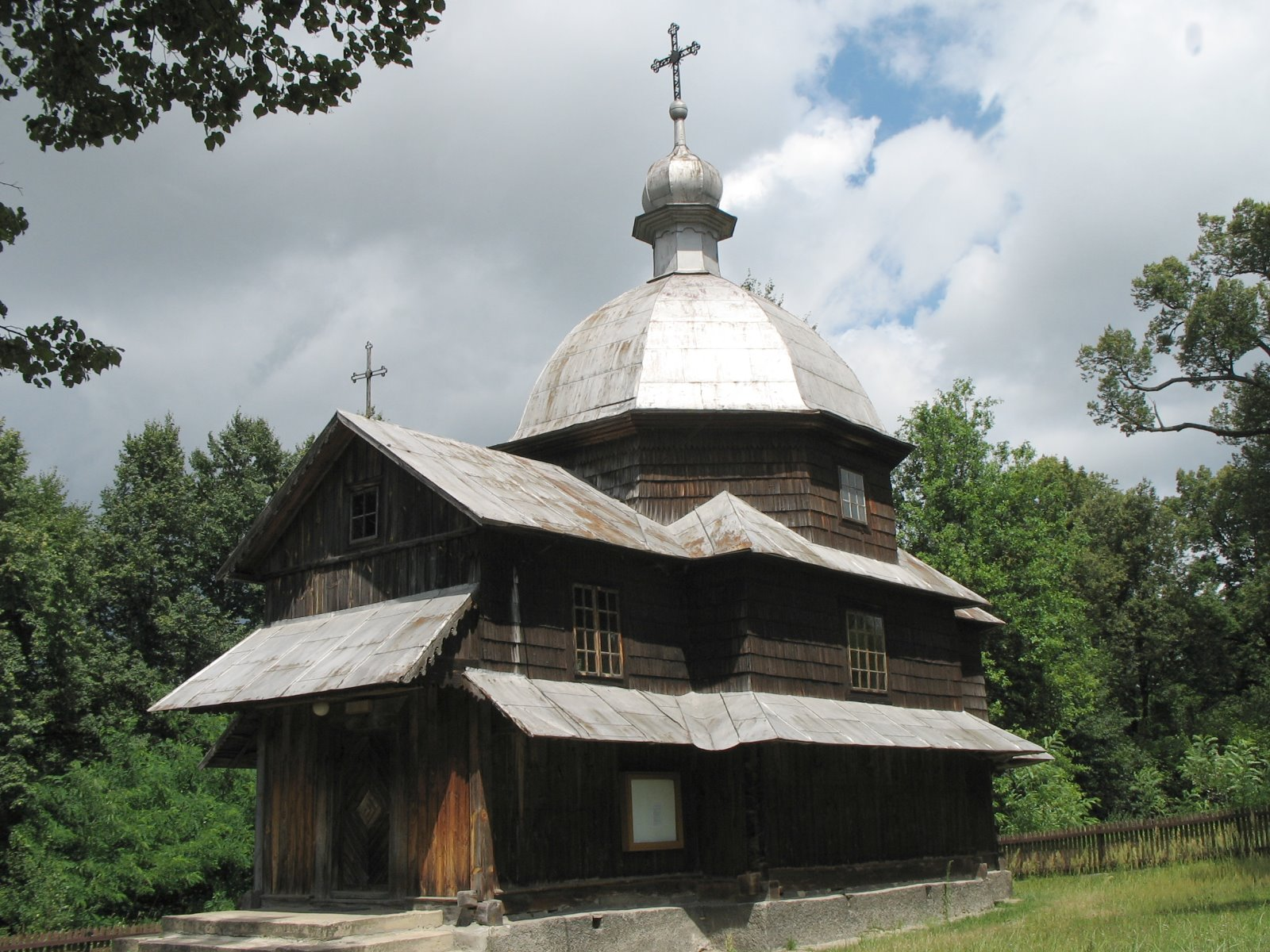

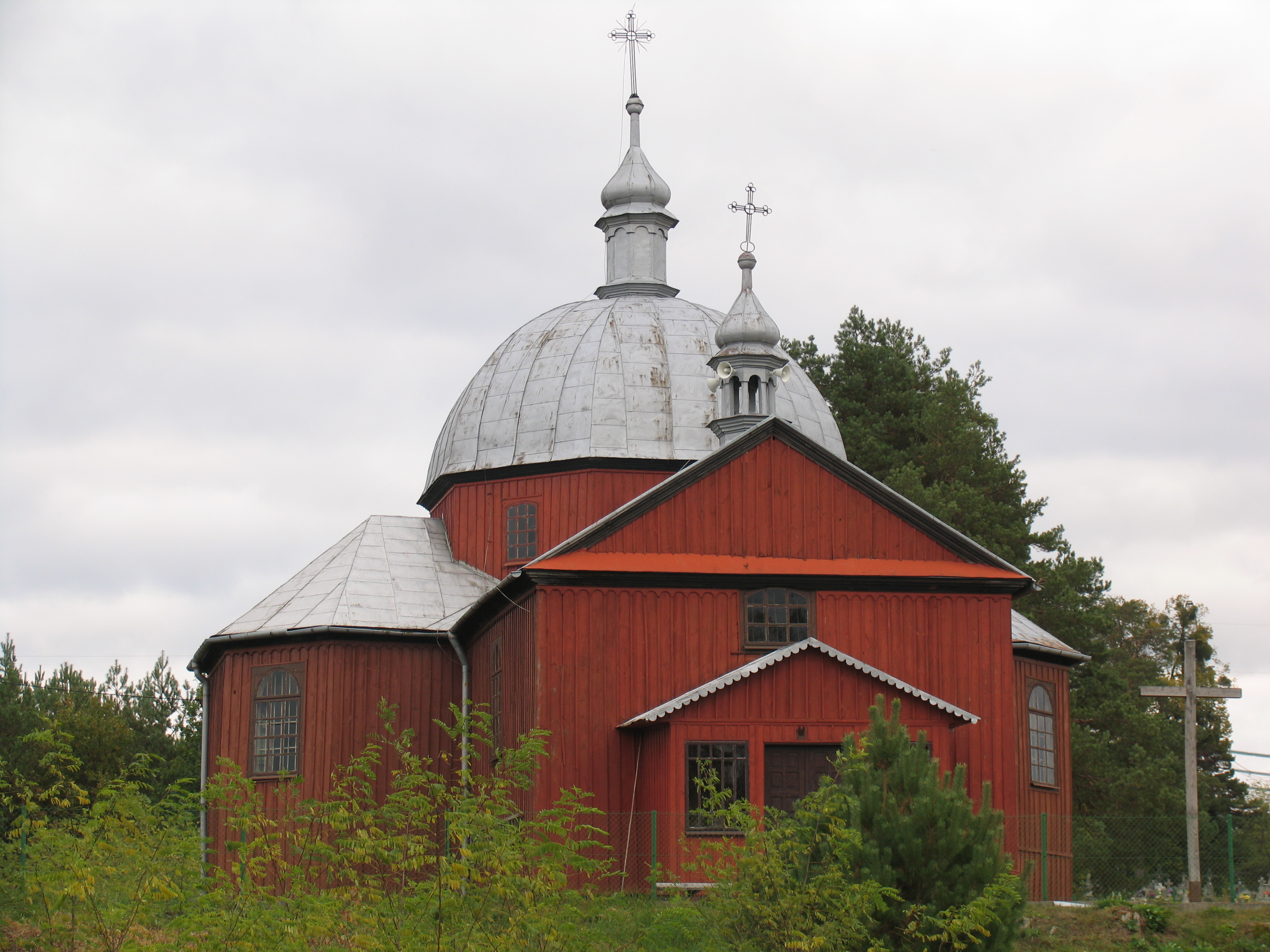

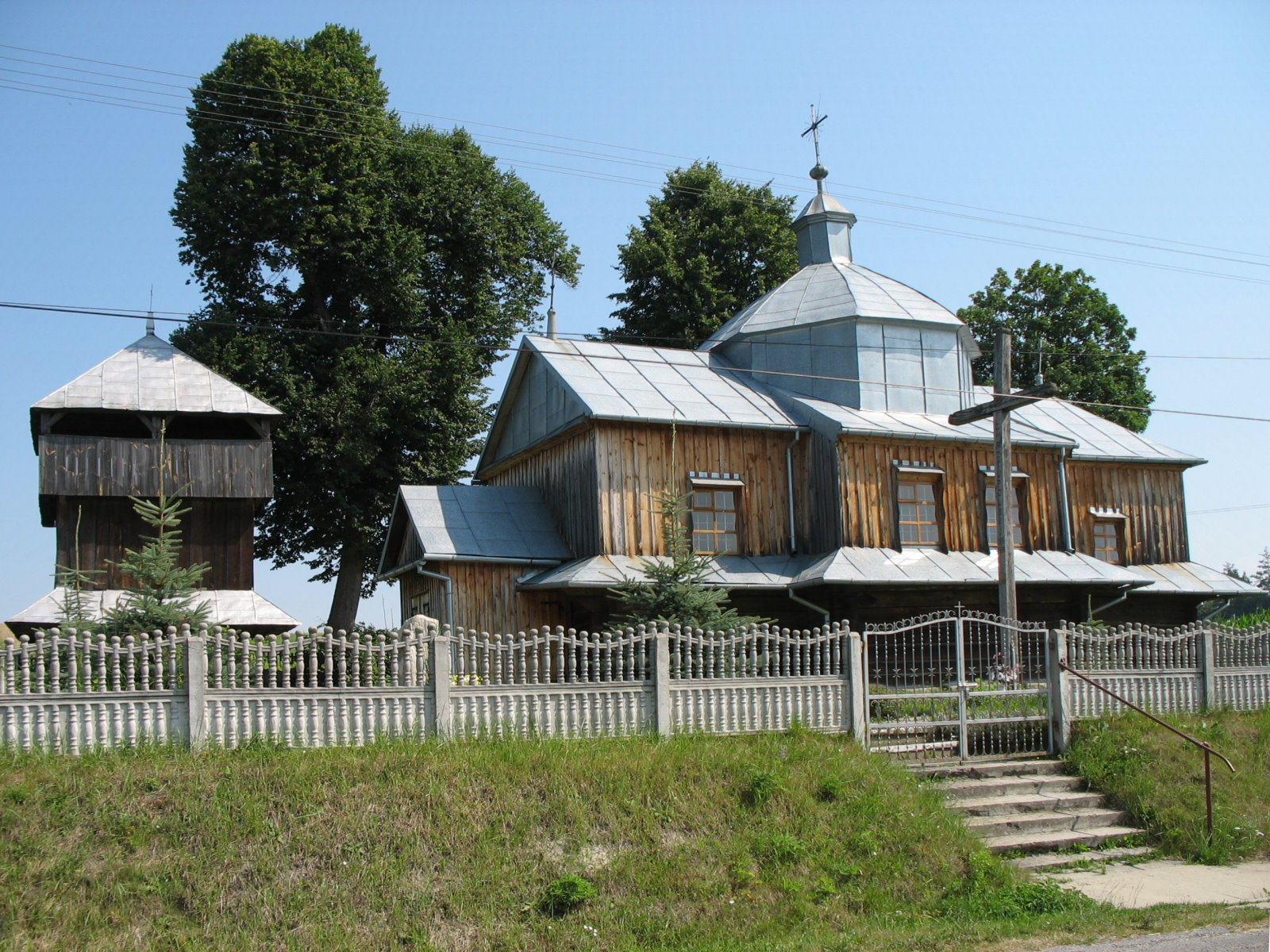

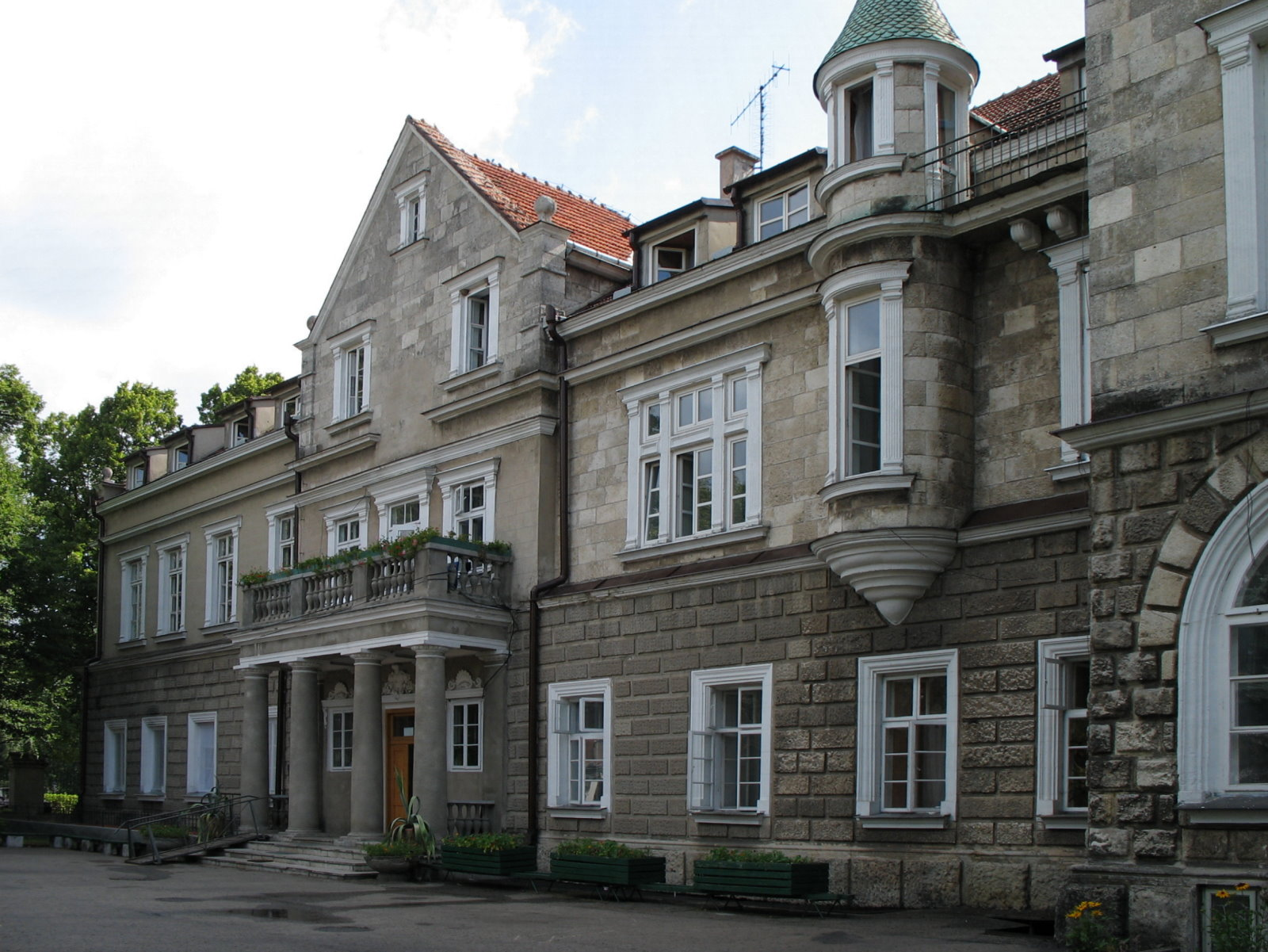

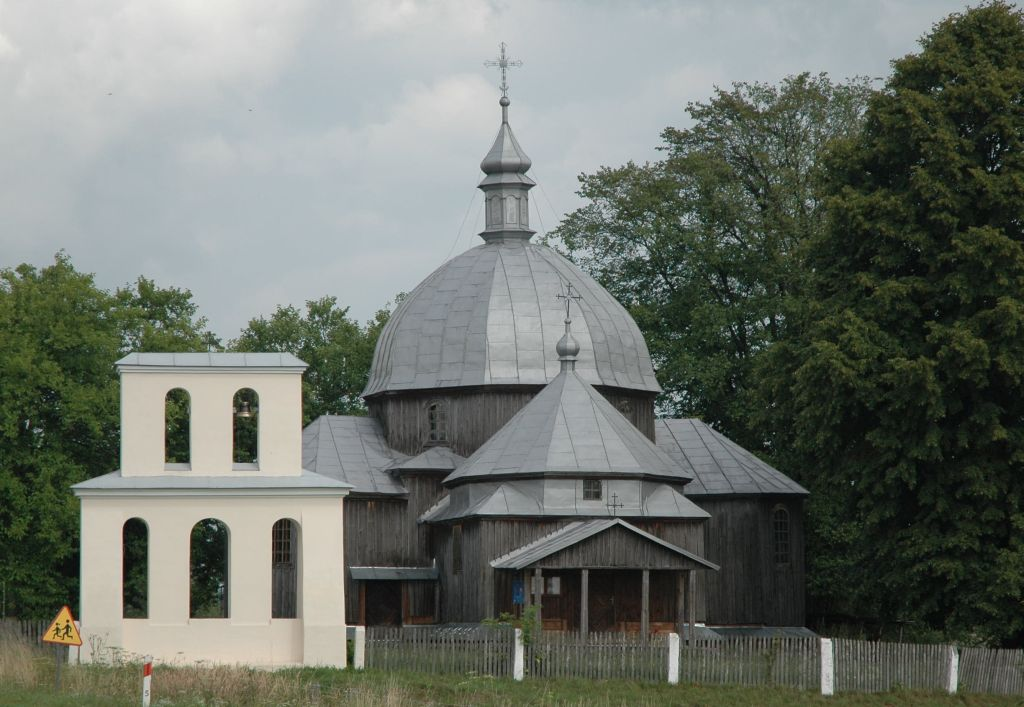

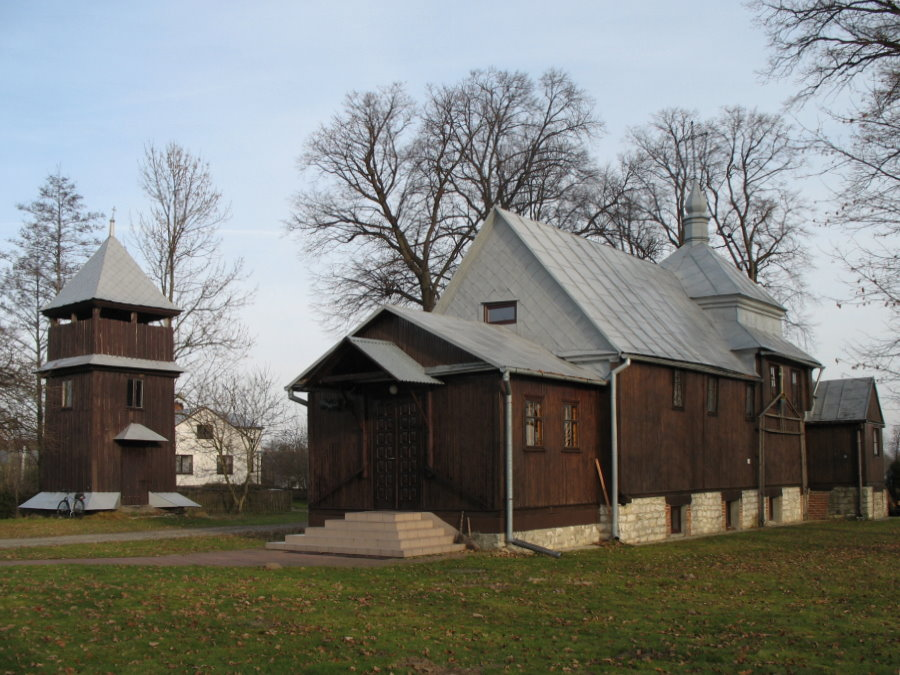
