= Dirlewanger Brigade =

German Waffen-SS infantry division

- German: 36. Waffen-Grenadier-Division der SS
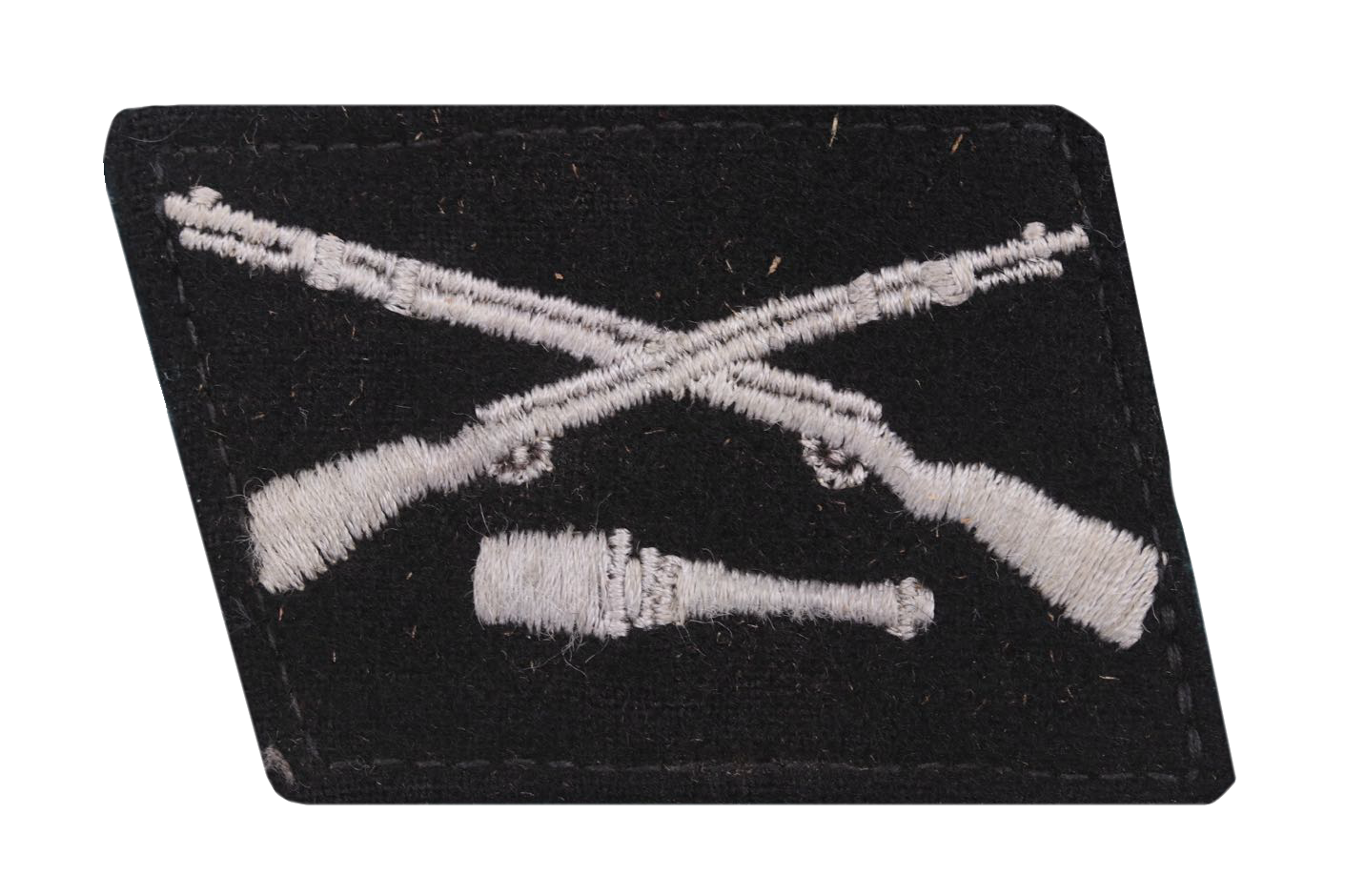
- Dirlewanger Brigade collar insignia
- Active: 1940–45
- Country: Nazi Germany
- Branch: (Schutzstaffel) Waffen-SS
- Type: Infantry
- Role: Bandenbekämpfung (security warfare; literally "combating of bandits")
- Size: Company; Battalion; Regiment; Brigade; Division
- Nickname: Black Hunters
- Engagements: World War II; Anti-partisan operations in Belarus; Warsaw Uprising; Slovak National Uprising; Battle of Ipolysag; Battle of Halbe

Commanders
- Notable commanders: Oskar Dirlewanger

The Dirlewanger Brigade, also known as the 2.SS-Sturmbrigade Dirlewanger (19 December 1944), or the 36th Waffen Grenadier Division of the SS (German: 36. Waffen-Grenadier-Division der SS), or The Black Hunters (German: Die schwarzen Jäger), was a unit of the Waffen-SS during World War II. The unit, named after its commander Oskar Dirlewanger, consisted of convicted criminals, other prisoners, and some volunteers. Originally formed from convicted poachers in 1940 and first deployed for guarding a labor camp and later counter-insurgency duties against the Polish resistance movement, the brigade saw service in German-occupied Eastern Europe, with an especially active role in the anti-partisan operations in Belarus. The unit is regarded as the most brutal and notorious Waffen-SS unit, with its soldiers described as "The ideal genocidal killers who neither gave nor expected quarter." The unit is regarded as the most infamous Waffen-SS unit in Poland and Belarus, and arguably the worst military unit in modern European history in terms of criminality and cruelty.

During its operations, the unit participated in the mass murder of civilians and committed other atrocities in German-occupied Eastern Europe. It gained a reputation among Wehrmacht and the Waffen-SS officers for its brutality. It epitomized the "anti-partisan activity on the Eastern front that emerged from the image of the hunt and the animalization of the enemy." The unit continuously committed sadistic acts of violence, torture, rape and murder, and enjoyed plundering wherever they went. Dirlewanger himself often beat and killed his own troops as well, especially when they displeased him.

According to French historian Christian Ingrao, Dirlewanger's unit committed the worst atrocities of the Second World War, while the American historian Timothy Snyder noted they committed more atrocities than any other unit. The unit killed at least 30,000, and up to 120,000 civilians in Belarus alone and destroyed some 200 villages. Several German commanders and officials attempted to remove Dirlewanger from command and to dissolve the unit, but powerful patrons within the Nazi apparatus protected Dirlewanger and intervened on his behalf. Amongst other actions, the unit took part in the destruction of Warsaw in late 1944 and in the Wola massacre of more than 50,000 of Warsaw's inhabitants in August 1944 during the Warsaw Uprising. In Warsaw the unit killed at least 12,500, and up to 30,000 people, most of them non-combatants. The unit participated in the brutal suppression of the Slovak National Uprising of August to October 1944.

== Oskar Dirlewanger ==
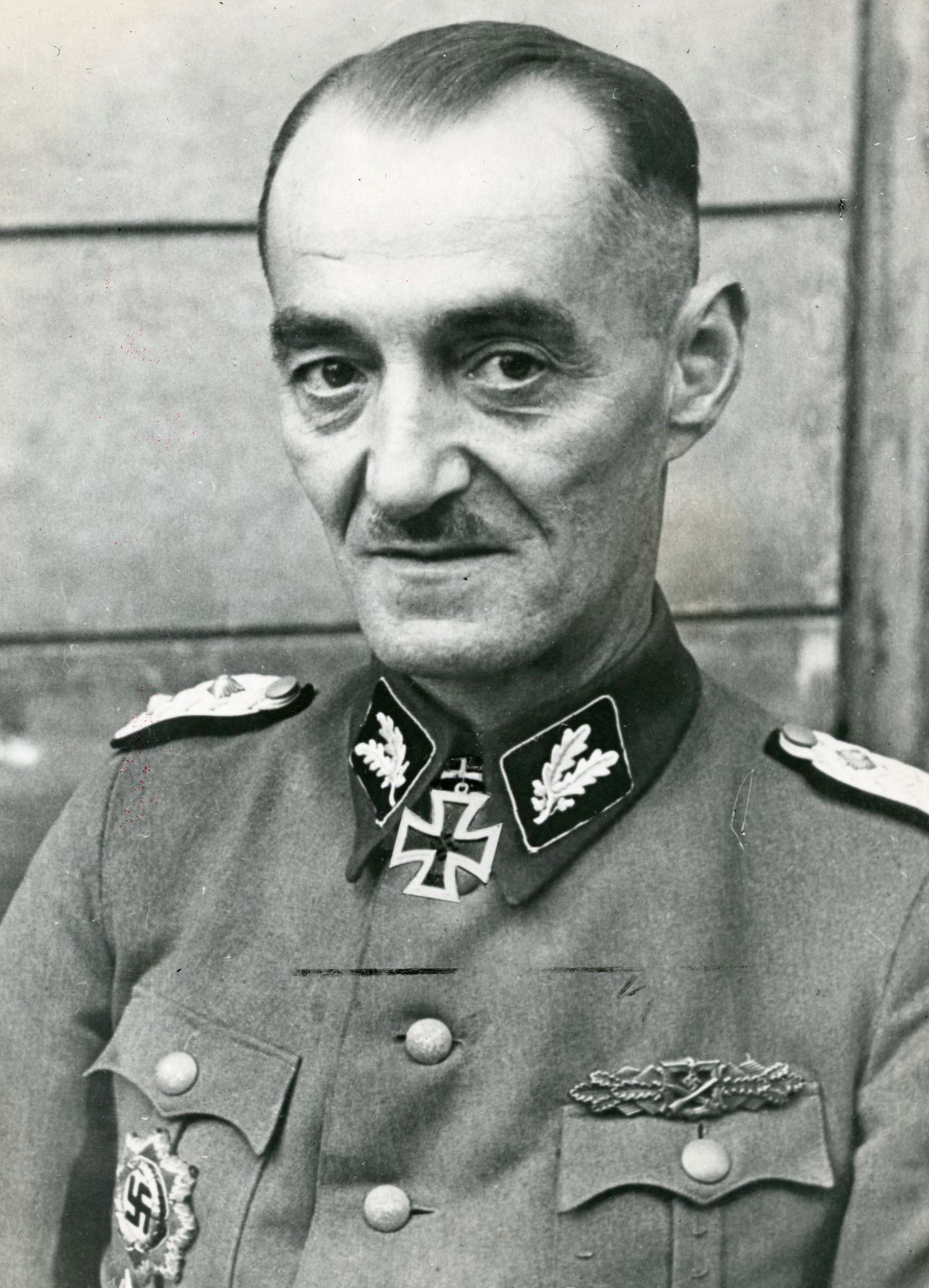
Oskar Dirlewanger in 1944.

The eponymous Dirlewanger Brigade was led by World War I veteran and habitual offender Oskar Dirlewanger, considered by historian Knut Stang, an amoral violent alcoholic who was claimed to have possessed a sadistic sexual fetish and a barbaric nature.

After enlisting in the German Army as a machine gunner in 1913, Dirlewanger served in the XIII (Royal Württemberg) Corps rising to the rank of Leutnant (lieutenant) and receiving the Iron Cross first and second class during World War I. He joined the Freikorps and took part in crushing the German Revolution of 1918–19. After graduating from Frankfurt's Goethe University with a doctorate in political science in 1922, he worked at a bank and at a knitwear factory. By 1923, he had joined the Nazi Party. In 1934, he was sentenced to two years' imprisonment for "contributing to the delinquency of a minor with whom he was sexually involved", and for stealing government property. The conviction led to him being expelled from the Nazi Party (but he was permitted to reapply for membership). Soon after his release, Dirlewanger was rearrested for sexual assault and sent to a concentration camp at Welzheim. In desperation, he contacted his old World War I comrade Gottlob Berger who was now a senior Nazi working closely with Reichsführer-SS Heinrich Himmler. Berger used his influence to help Dirlewanger join the Condor Legion, a German unit which fought in the Spanish Civil War (1936–1939).

On his return to Germany in 1939, Berger helped Dirlewanger join the Waffen-SS with the rank of SS-Obersturmführer. In mid-1940, after the invasion of Poland, Berger arranged for Dirlewanger to command and train a military unit of convicted poachers for partisan-hunting (Bandenbekämpfung).

== Composition ==
In March 1940, Adolf Hitler received a letter from the wife of an Old Fighter party member, who revealed that her husband had been arrested and convicted for poaching in one of Germany's national forests. He had been caught hunting without a license or permit, a serious offense. The woman, in her desperate plea, begged Hitler to release her husband. She proposed that he be sent to the frontline, believing that such an act would allow him to redeem himself and restore his honor.

Gottlob Berger revealed, during his interrogation by the International Military Tribunal, that the letter was the main basis for the unit's founding. He also stated that:

The Dirlewanger Brigade owes its existence to an order of Adolf Hitler given in 1940 while the campaign in the West was still going on. One day Himmler called me up and told me that Hitler had ordered all men convicted of poaching with firearms who were [currently] in prison were to be collected and formed into a special detachment. That Hitler should have such a somewhat unusual and far-fetched idea at all is due to the following reason: first of all, he himself didn't like hunting and had nothing but scorn for all hunters. Whenever he could ridicule them he did.

After considering the request outlined in the letter—and influenced by his own views on poaching—Hitler decided to adopt the concept and transform it into an actual formation. On 23 March 1940, an advisor in the Ministry of Justice at the time, Franz Gürtner received a telephone call from Himmler's adjutant, SS-Gruppenführer Karl Wolff informing them that Hitler had decided to give "suspended sentences to so-called 'honorable poachers' and, depending on their behavior at the front, to pardon them". A confirmation of Hitler's order was sent specifying that the poachers should, where possible, be Bavarian and Austrian, not be guilty of crimes involving trap setting, and were to be enrolled in marksmen's rifle corps. The men were to combine their knowledge of hunting and woodcraft similar to traditional Jäger elite riflemen with the courage and initiative of those who willingly broke the law.

In late May 1940, Dirlewanger was sent to Oranienburg to take charge of 80 selected men convicted of poaching crimes who were temporarily released from their sentences. After two months of training, 55 men were selected with the rest sent back to prison. On 14 June 1940, the Wilddiebkommando Oranienburg ("Oranienburg Poacher's Unit") was formed as part of the Waffen-SS, subordinated to the SS-Totenkopf's 5th Regiment. Himmler made Dirlewanger its commander. The unit was sent to Poland where it was joined by four Waffen-SS non-commissioned officers selected for their previous disciplinary records and twenty other recruits. By September 1940, the formation numbered over 300 men. Dirlewanger was promoted to SS-Obersturmführer by Himmler. With the influx of criminals, the emphasis on poachers was now lost, though many of the former poachers rose to non-commissioned officer ranks to train the unit. Those convicted of other crimes, including the criminally insane and homosexuals, also joined the unit.

From the beginning, the formation attracted criticism from both the Nazi Party and the SS for the idea that convicted criminals who were forbidden to carry arms, therefore then exempt from conscription in the Wehrmacht, could be a part of the elite SS. A solution was found where it was proclaimed that the formation was not part of the SS, but under the control of the SS. Accordingly, the unit name was changed to Sonderkommando Dirlewanger ("Special Unit Dirlewanger"). In January 1942, to rebuild its strength, the unit was authorised to recruit Russian and Ukrainian volunteers. By February 1943, the number of men in the battalion doubled to 700 (half of them Volksdeutsche). In May 1944, the 550 men (Turkestanis, Volga Tartars, Azerbaijanis, Kyrgyz, Uzbek, and Tajiks) from the Ostmuselmanische SS-Regiment were attached to the SS-Sonderregiment Dirlewanger.

Although other Strafbataillons were raised as the war proceeded and the need for further manpower grew, these penal military units were for those convicted of military offences, whereas the recruits sent to the unit were convicted of major crimes such as premeditated murder, rape, arson, and burglary. Dirlewanger provided them with an opportunity to commit atrocities on such a scale that it even raised complaints within the brutal SS. Historian Martin Windrow described them as a "terrifying rabble" of "cut-throats, renegades, sadistic morons, and cashiered rejects from other units". Some Nazi officials romanticized the unit, viewing the men as "pure primitive German men" who were "resisting the law".

== Operational history ==
During the organization's time in the Soviet Union, the unit burned women and children alive, let packs of starved dogs feed on them, and injected Jewish women with strychnine. Transcripts of the Nuremberg trials show Soviet prosecutors frequently questioning defendants accused of war crimes on the Eastern Front about their knowledge of the Dirlewanger Brigade. Heinrich Himmler noted the brutality of Dirlewanger, noting that "The tone in the regiment is, I may say, in many cases a medieval one with cudgels and such things. If anyone expresses doubts about winning the war he is likely to fall dead from the table."

Dirlewanger was notoriously brutal toward his own men, forcing their compliance by involving them in the unit's murders. He maintained control through draconian discipline that ignored military law, frequently resorting to arbitrary beatings and even the execution of his own soldiers.

The deputy commander, Kurt Weisse, has been described as the soldier in Dirlewanger that came closest to matching Dirlewanger in "brutality, cruelty, and outright sadism", and if "there was anyone in the unit who matched the classic profile of a psychopath, it was he." Weisse was hand-picked by Dirlewanger in May 1943 for his criminality.

=== Poland ===
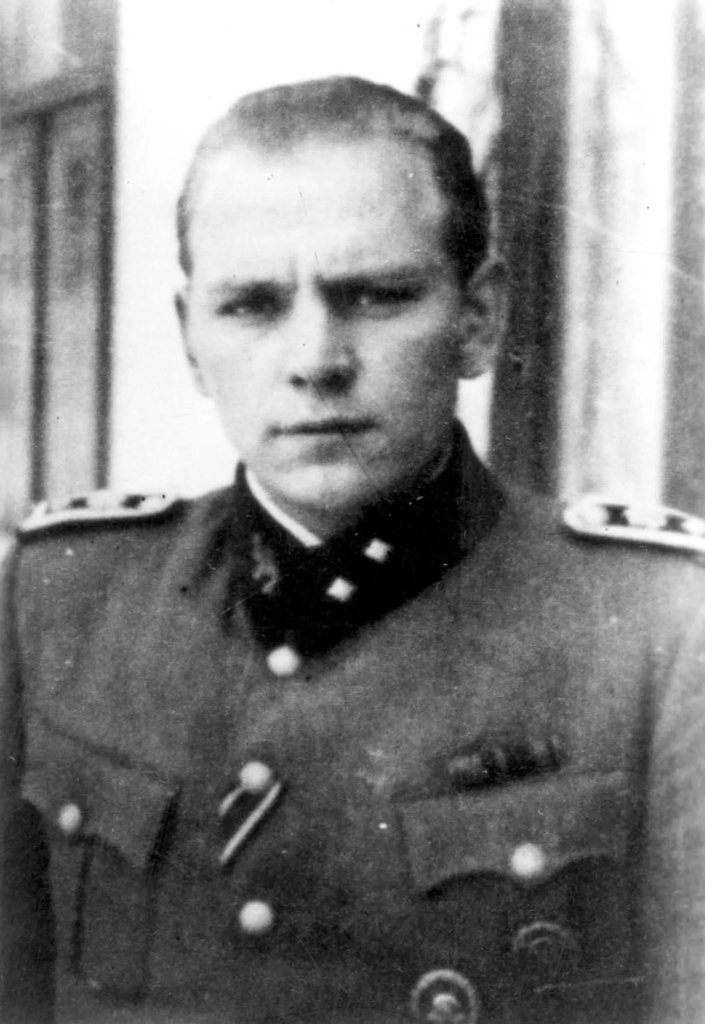
Heinz Feiertag was a former member of the 1st SS Panzer Division "LSSAH" and 3rd SS Panzer Division "Totenkopf", who was transferred to SS-Sonderkommando Dirlewanger in July 1941 as an instructor, later serving as a company commander, before being transferred to the SS-Hauptamt branch in Oslo on 2 September 1943.

On 1 August 1940, the unit was formally transferred to the 5. SS-Totenkopf Regiment. One month later, the unit was retitled to Sonderkommando Dirlewanger. On 1 September 1940, they were informed that they would not be sent to any frontlines but instead assigned to guard duties in the region of Lublin (site of a Nazi-established "Jew reservation" established under the Nisko Plan) in the General Government territory of German-occupied Poland. The unit was reinforced with hundreds of additional volunteers from Sachsenhausen which contained a mixture of poachers, SS men, or both. In September 1940, the unit now with the strength of approximately 280-300 men began their move from Sachsenhausen to Lublin, by railway, taking around 10–14 hours. Upon arrival, the unit was subordinated to SS-Brigadeführer Odilo Globocnik, who served as the Höherer SS- und Polizeiführer-Ost's representative for Lublin, and they were quartered at a school building which had been occupied by troops from other SS units. They stayed there for a day and departed for Stary Dzików where they operated alongside the communes of Bełżec and Narol.

Even though they received additional training, they were tasked with guarding the ghetto in Lublin, where they often abused the population. For example, according to Morgen's report, Dirlewanger arrested Jews on the charge of ritual murder and then, demanded ransoms up to 15,000 złoty or the prisoners would be shot.

Their main task in Stary Dzików was to supervise the Jews who were carrying out roadworks. They also carried out training in the General Government, taking on guard duty in labor camps and combating smuggling and black-market trade. They also prepared for their later operations in Lviv where the Sonderkommando, including Dirlewanger himself, supervised the digging of a trench line near the Bug river. After the operation's end, Dirlewanger was again ordered to combat smuggling and black-market activities. At that time, the unit was divided into smaller groups, with each assigned different tasks, under the supervision of an SS-Unterscharführer. Some of them were sent to supervise the building of the fortification at the Bug River, while others served at Bełżec near Chełm guarding a camp complex, and near Deblin where some of them supervised the building of a bridge and protecting some facilities, while several more served near Lviv and as far as Riga, Latvia where they supervised a large warehouse. Since partisans often attacked and killed German official and guards, the task of the Sonderkommando included patrolling in the forests of Lublin and Stary Dzikow in search of partisan groups and their camps. The patrols would oversee a radius of 40-50 km.

In October 1941, four soldiers from the Sonderkommando were sent to Lutsk labor camp as sentries and one of them, SS-Oberscharführer Heinz Feiertag become the camp's first commandant. He personally fenced off the area and brought in the Jews from the ghetto to work as forced labors. The camp produced items such as: shoe polish, floor polish, soaps and brushes. A tailor's workshop was also set up in the camp. In just 2.5 months, the camp brought in a net income of 25,000 marks before the facility was taken over by the civilian administration. During a postwar proceeding, a Jewish witness who was one of the workers in the camp described Feiertag's criminal activities in the camp:

"Feiertag visited the workshop several times a day. Not a day went by without him beating one of the workers. I remember exactly how once in the shoemakers' workshop a pair of boots was made upon his order. Feiertag was very pleased with them. As proof of his delight, he commanded the foreman, the Jew Wydra, to be given 15–20 blows of the stick. Feiertag knew perfectly how to torment prisoners. There was no day that somebody did not get a thrashing. For the beatings, a stick was used on the naked body. Two SS men would carry out the beatings. They reveled in [torturing] the victim all day long. They called him [the prisoner] names, ordered him about, made him sing songs, and then they had him undress completely [and] dig himself a grave in the camp yard. The torture lasted several hours. In the end, they shot him."

According to historian Matthew Cooper, "wherever the Dirlewanger unit operated, corruption and rape formed an every-day part of life and indiscriminate slaughter, beatings and looting were rife". Even within the brutal hierarchy of the General Government, concerns were raised about the unit's conduct. (HSSPF) Friedrich-Wilhelm Krüger eventually demanded the quick removal of the unit from his territory, or he would have the men arrested.

The unit's crimes continued when it returned to Poland to help suppress the Warsaw Uprising in 1944. Crimes included the mass rape and murder of 15 Red Cross nurses and the killing of thousands of civilians. After troops entered a makeshift military hospital, they first killed the wounded with bayonets and rifle butts before gang-raping the women. The naked bleeding nurses were then taken outside, hanged by their feet and shot in their stomachs. The unit would carry out atrocities during the Wola massacre in which more than 40,000 Polish civilians were killed in reprisal on the orders of Himmler.

=== Belarus ===
The territory of the Byelorussian Soviet Socialist Republic (modern Belarus) was occupied in 1941 and formed part of Reichskommissariat Ostland. In this region, Dirlewanger came under the command of local HSSPF Erich von dem Bach-Zelewski. Dirlewanger gained the reputation of "exceeding all others", even amongst the SS, in "brutality and depravity". The unit resumed its so-called anti-partisan activities (Bandenbekämpfung). Dirlewanger's preferred method of operation was to gather civilians in a barn, set it on fire, and shoot at anyone who tried to escape; the victims of his unit numbered at least 30,000. Some estimate around 200 villages were destroyed and around 120,000 were killed. Dirlewanger had formed a procedure to determine which village would be targeted next. He would fly a light reconnaissance plane over any village suspected of harboring partisans and if the plane were shot at, he would mark the village's location on the map. Later, he would return and lead an attack, setting the targeted village on fire and killing all its inhabitants.

==== 1942 ====
Not long after their arrival in Belarus, they soon found themselves in action. From 2 to 10 March 1942, the unit encountered a strong band of partisans northeast of Osipovichi. They managed to rout the partisans and capture a large stockpile of weapons. On 12 March 1942, they were attacked once again but successfully defeated a large group of partisans near Tscherwakow. They were later attacked by a larger group of partisans at Klicev. Dirlewanger then initiated an operation in the forest area southwest of Mogilev.

In April, the unit fell under the command of Police Regiment "Mitte" led by Oberst der Schutzpolizei Leo von Braunschweig. They were tasked with clearing the area near the Drut and Beresina Rivers. On 2 April 1942, along with Police Battalions 32 and 307, was sent to the northern area of the road connecting Mogilev and Bobrujsk for local anti-partisan operation. They launched an assault on the villages of Selleri and Lushiza, pushing the partisans into the treacherous swampland north of Batsevichi.

Dirlewanger and his men had a little success in searching for partisan activity for the first ten days of May. Eventually, two days later, they burnt the village of Sucha under a suspicion of assisting the partisans. On 24 May 1942, Dirlewanger was awarded the Clasp to the Iron Cross 2nd Class. On 28 May 1942, Dirlewanger was notified that a Ukrainian platoon with the strength of 60 men would be reporting to Dirlewanger's Sonderkommando. From 29 May to 31 May 1942, they conducted a local partisan sweep. They burnt two villages and shot five partisans near Raswada. In early June 1942, they defeated a large group of partisans between the area of Orsha and Bastocholi. They later returned to Orsha and fought against another band of partisans. On 16 May 1942, Dirlewanger conducted a "punishment expedition" after receiving a report of the death of 17 German police officials, ambushed by partisans. The unit spent the rest of the month fighting in Orsha.

On 15 June 1942, the village of Borki in Kirawsk region was encircled by the Germans. They burned the village down and shot all of the inhabitants. SD men and Dirlewanger's soldiers participated in the pacification. A report by Dirlewanger on 16 June 1942 indicated that a total of 2,027 inhabitants were shot dead by the German forces. 633 of the inhabitant were shot by the SD and 282 of them were killed for running away from the village. Afterwards, Dirlewanger reported that the operation carried out took place without the contact of the enemy. Those who ran away were shot, three of whom were armed. A search was conducted, and support for the partisans discovered. They found 7 Russian rifles, 3 grenades, ammunition, and 2 pistols. The male inhabitants were mostly absent, and there were only a few horses mostly without any wagons. This massacre was reported by Panteleimon Ponomarenko, the Chief of Staff of the Central Headquarters of the Partisan Movement on 17 July 1942 directly to Stalin, Molotov and Beria in which he stated:

"...at the end of June, a German pacification unit encircled the village of Borki in the Kirawsk region and then burned it down and shot its inhabitants, including children and the elderly."

In a post-war testimony, an anonymous member of the SS-Sonderbataillon Dirlewanger recalled what he witnessed during an anti-partisan operation in Belarus:

During a march – and we had driven 200 km close to Smolensk – the villages were encircled. Nobody was allowed to leave or enter. The fields were searched, and the people were sent back to the village. The next morning around 6:00 AM. all these people – it was a larger village with approximately 2,500 people – children, women, the elderly were pushed into four or five barns. Then Dirlewanger appeared with 10 men, officers, etc. and said: "Shoot them all immediately." In front of the barn, he positioned four SD-men with machine pistols. The barn was opened and Dirlewanger said, "Fire freely." Then there was indiscriminate shooting into the crowd of humans with the machine pistols, without distinction whether children, women, etc. were hit. It was a most horrendous action. The magazines were taken out, new ones were inserted. Then new aiming started. After that, the barn was closed again. The SD-men removed straw from the roofs and set the barns on fire. This was the most horrible spectacle which I have ever seen in my life. The barns were burning brightly. Nobody could escape until the barns fell down. Meanwhile, Dirlewanger and his staff positioned themselves with the Russian rapid fire guns about 50 meters away from the barn. Then from the barns some lightly wounded, some heavily wounded and others who had not yet been hit stormed out, burning all over their bodies. Now these bastards shot these people who tried to escape, with Dirlewanger in front, until there was nobody left. I have witnessed this example which I have described in at least four or five other cases. Each of these villages was leveled down to the ground.

At the beginning of July 1942, the Sonderkommando took part in an operation with the Wehrmacht in the district of Klicev. A battle occurred in the area of Wojenitschi, where they successfully destroyed a partisan group. On 9 July 1942, Dirlewanger was wounded and left the unit to fly to Berlin on 19 July 1942. He eventually was awarded the Wound badge in Gold on 12 July 1942. As a result of the battle, Dirlewanger lost a single soldier and six others were wounded. From 1 July to 12 August 1942, the unit took part in the Operation Adler, an anti-partisan sweep against a partisan group with a strength of up to five thousand fighters in the area of Babruysk district.

==== 1943 ====
On 26 January 1943, a proposal by Dirlewanger for the battalion's special collar insignia was approved by Himmler. This insignia silver-grey machine-embroidered crossed rifles above a horizontal stick grenade on black wool. The criteria for receiving this insignia were limited to those who had completed their rehabilitation sentence. Members such as Herbert Meyer were issued the insignia after being found rehabilitated. Officers in the battalion were not required to wear the insignia, as it was exclusive to enlisted men.

In March 1943, together with the Schutzmannschaft Battalion 118, the battalion carried out operations against partisans and civilians in the Smalyavichy and Lahoysk districts. On 22 March 1943, after receiving an alarm signal from the 1st Company of Schutzmannschaft Battalion 118, the Battalion's 1st Company was sent to reinforce the recently ambushed Platoons of Battalion 118. Together, they made an offensive operation against the partisans that had ambushed the 1st Company's convoy. They entered and attacked Khatyn. The partisans who had taken shelter in the village turned it into a defensive position. Due to strong resistance by the partisans, Dirlewanger's men used their mortars and heavy guns to suppress further resistance. As a result, 34 partisans were killed and the whole population of Khatyn was herded into a shed where they were burnt alive by the Schutzmannschaft Battalion 118's men with the assistance of Dirlewanger's troops. On 30 April 1943, the 1st battery from SS-Polizei Artillerie Abteilung "Weissruthenien" led by Oberleutnant der Schutzpolizei Josef Steinhauer, consisting of 58 men, was attached to the SS-Sonderbataillon Dirlewanger.

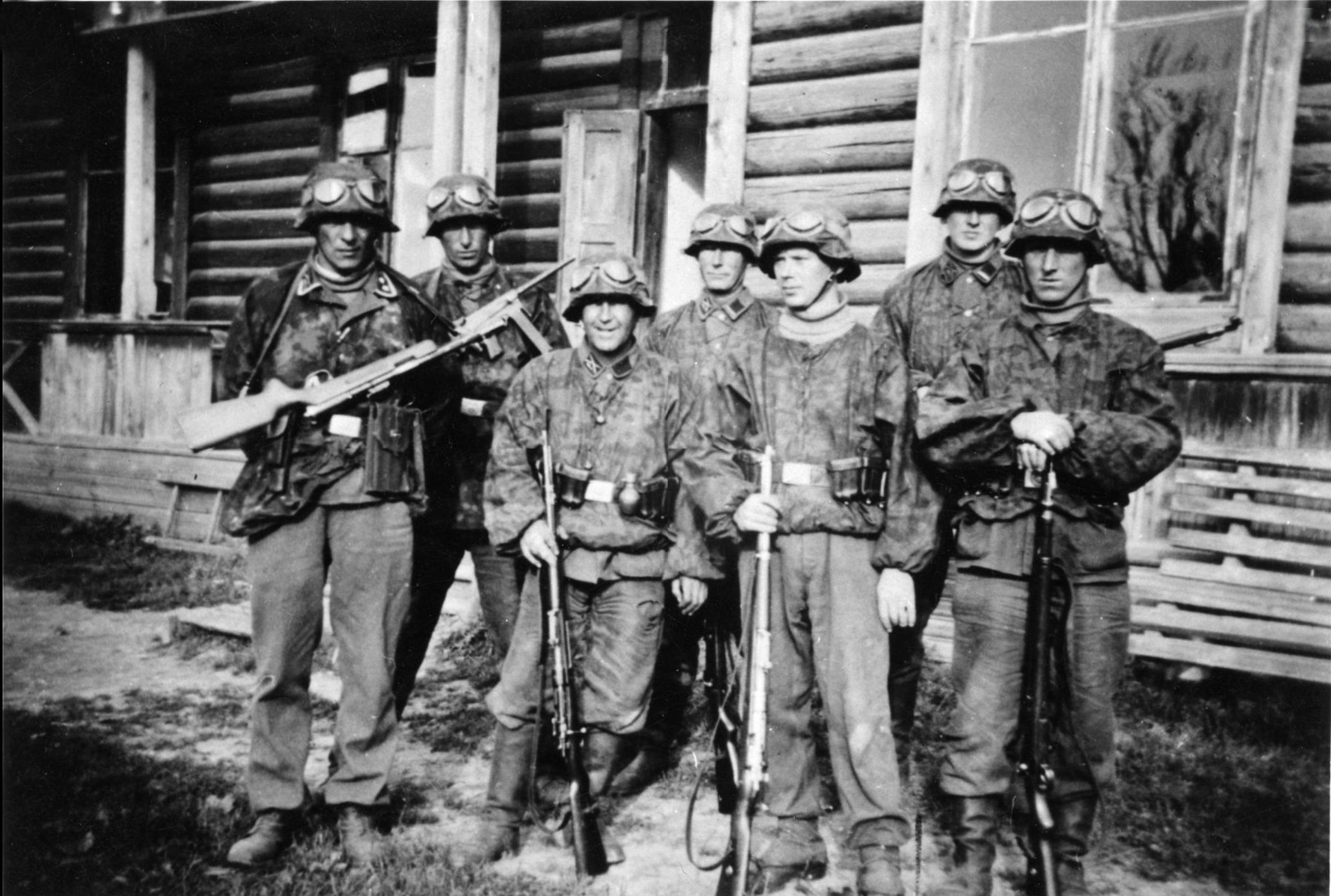
Motorcycle reconnaissance platoon in full combat gear.

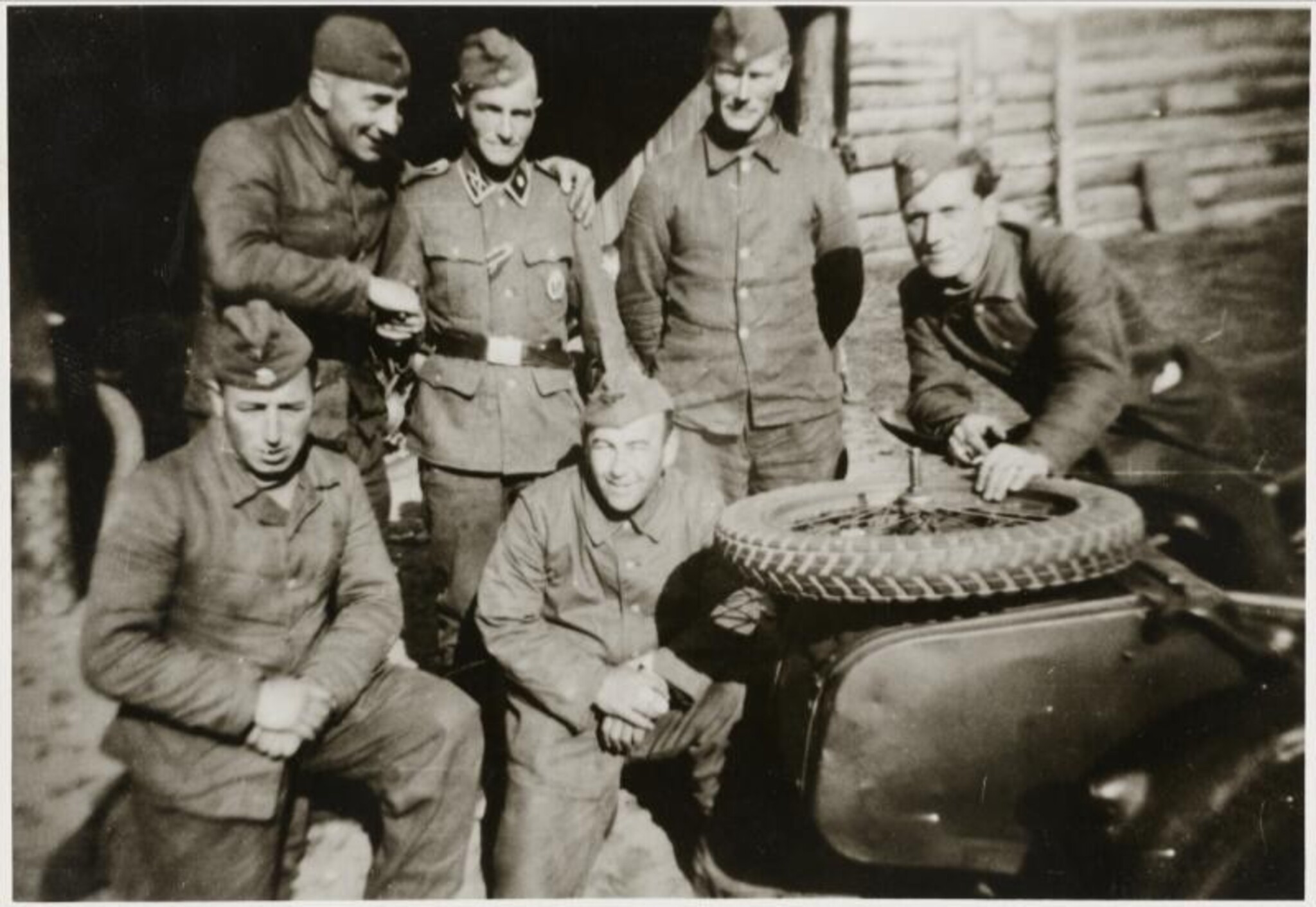
Members of the motorcycle reconnaissance platoon from SS-Sonderbataillon Dirlewanger.

Operation Cottbus began on 20 May 1943 as part of the German effort to suppress partisan activity in the Vitebsk region. The operation involved Police, SS, and collaborationist units operating under the command of the Höherer SS- und Polizeiführer (HSSPF) Russland-Mitte und Weißruthenien. Among the participating forces was SS-Sonderbataillon Dirlewanger. On 28 May 1943, Dirlewanger and his unit took part in the operation and advanced toward a heavily fortified position at Hill 119.1, located five kilometers west of Paliksee.

The operation was one of the largest anti-partisan campaigns conducted by the Germans in Belarus. At least 20,000 victims were killed, while German losses remained minimal, with fewer than 60 soldiers killed in action. Not everyone was impressed with Dirlewanger's actions. A civilian propaganda officer who toured the Operation Cottbus area reported witnessing horrific scenes—some partisans had been burned alive, and their charred remains were being eaten by roaming pigs. Wilhelm Kube, the Generalkommissar of Generalbezirk Weißruthenien, protested Dirlewanger's actions, raising his concerns through Alfred Rosenberg to Himmler. In response, Gottlob Berger dismissed the accusations as nonsense, insisting that Dirlewanger's battalion was not as described.

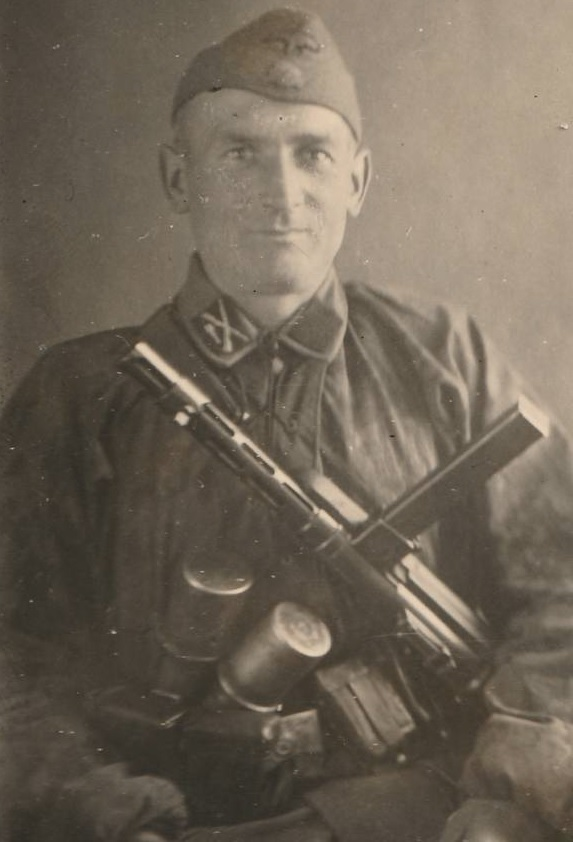
SS-Grenadier Karl Hans Jung was a career criminal who was transferred to the SS-Sonderbataillon Dirlewanger for probation service.

According to historian Timothy Snyder:

As it inflicted its first fifteen thousand mortal casualties, the Special Commando Dirlewanger lost only ninety-two men—many of them, no doubt, to friendly fire and alcoholic accidents. A ratio such as that was possible only when the victims were unarmed civilians.

In September 1942, the unit murdered 8,350 Jews in Baranovichi ghetto and then a further 389 people labelled "bandits" and 1,274 "bandit suspects". According to the historian, Martin Kitchen, the unit "committed such shocking atrocities in the Soviet Union, in the pursuit of partisans, that even an SS court was called upon to investigate". A witness reported Dirlewanger men roasting captured partisans alive and then throwing their bodies to a herd of hungry pigs. Women were raped and then kept as "sexual cattle", in which they would be traded amongst the men for "two bottles of vodka", with even children being raped and tortured to death.

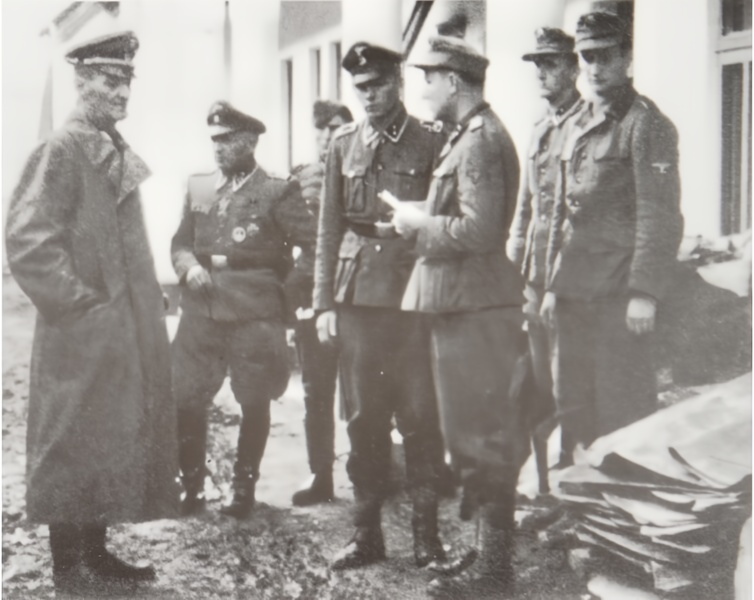
SS-Obersturmbannführer Oskar Dirlewanger and battalion staff at their quarters in Łohojsk (Tyszkiewicz Palace), 1943. SS-Oberscharführer Heinz Feiertag (second from left) can be seen wearing the Bandenkampfabzeichen.

On 10 August 1943, the expansion of the battalion to regimental size was authorized by SS Führungshauptamt under Hans Jüttner. However, the order faced delays due to a shortage of soldiers to fill the newly planned regiment and a lack of weapons to equip them. Lack of weapons resulted in Dirlewanger arming his troops with captured Soviet weapons. The actual expansion of the unit into a regiment did not begin until May 1944, when two battalions were formed from the original 1st company and 2nd company. The formation of a third battalion was delayed due to a shortage of men and did not occur until August 1944. Recruits were to come from criminals, eastern volunteers (Osttruppen), and military delinquents. On 19 February 1944, permission to take volunteers from concentration camps was granted by Himmler in order to fill the battalion before it could be expanded to a regiment. Over 700 men signed up as volunteers for the battalion, and most of them arrived in June 1944. Additionally, the battalion included 300 anti-communists from Soviet territory. By 11 September 1943, the battalion reported 8 officers and 403 men including non-commissioned officers. In November 1943, the battalion went into action with Army Group Centre to halt the Soviet advance, and suffered extreme casualties due to ineptitude. On 14 November 1943, the battalion along with two attached companies from 797th Army Security Regiment attacked elements of the Soviet forces near Kosari. This attack resulted in the death of several members including the commander of 2nd company, SS-Hauptsturmführer Rudolf Stöweno. On 17 November 1943, the battalion launched another attack alongside SS Police Regiment 24, however, a number of soldiers from the battalion fled from the fighting, resulting in the battalion putting out an order on 1 December 1943 that anyone showing cowardice in the face of the enemy would be sentenced to death.

In late November, Dirlewanger was sent home to Germany in Esslingen am Neckar to recover from his 11th wound after a recent battle, where a bullet grazed across his right arm and chest. While Dirlewanger was absent, the battalion's adjutant, SS-Hauptsturmführer Erwin Walser, took the position of acting battalion commander, while SS-Hauptsturmführer Kurt Weisse assumed the role of adjutant, which he held until the end of the war. Dirlewanger received the German Cross in gold on 5 December 1943 in recognition of his earnestness. By 30 December 1943, the unit consisted of only 259 men.

==== 1944 ====
In January 1944, Dirlewanger came back to Belarus to take the command back and put Walser in the position of Personnel Officer. Large numbers of pardoned criminals were sent to rebuild the battalion. By late February 1944, the battalion was back to full strength. It was decided that eastern volunteers would no longer be admitted to the unit, as the Russians had proven to be particularly unreliable in combat. Until 24 April 1944, their communications relied on the attached Wehrmacht units available. This changed when a 16-man platoon was transferred to the regiment from the SS-administered Postschutz in Berlin. None of these transferred troops had a criminal record nor were they assigned any probationary tasks. In May 1944, the SS-Sonderbataillon Dirlewanger was upgraded into a regiment size and retitled to SS-Sonderregiment Dirlewanger.

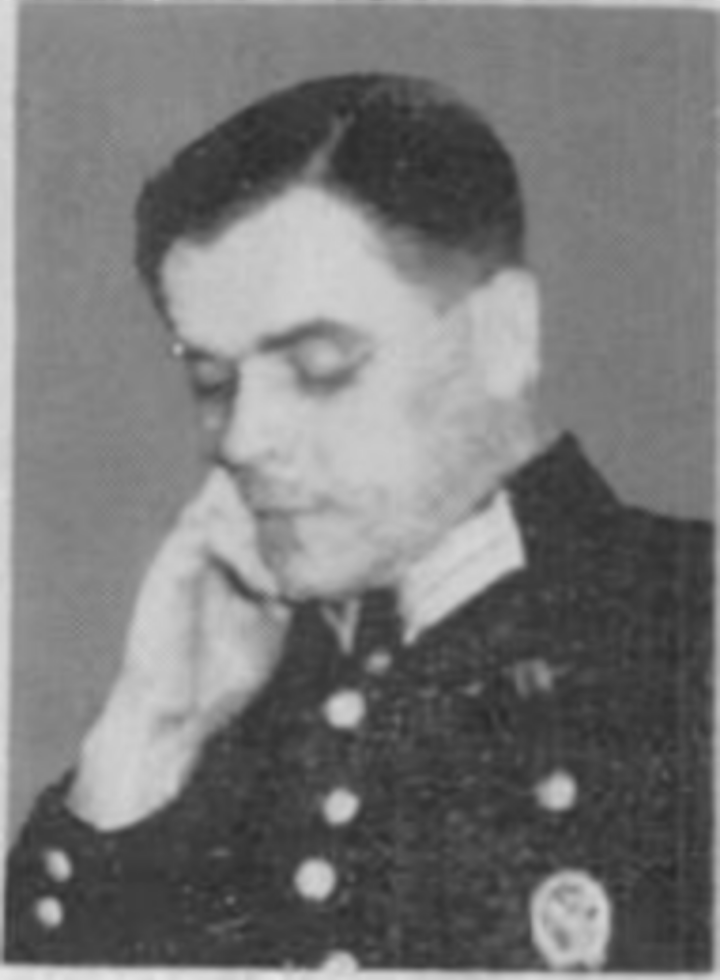
Josef Steinhauer, assigned first as the commander of an attached batterie in SS-Sonderbataillon Dirlewanger and later appointed as the battalion commander of the 2nd Battalion in SS-Sonderregiment Dirlewanger.

On 26 June 1944, an attachment of German Ordnungspolizei artillerymen led by Hauptmann der Schutzpolizei Josef Steinhauer was assigned to the regiment permanently and Steinhauer was appointed by Dirlewanger as the newly raised second battalion's commander. In March 1944, Hauptmann der Schutzpolizei Herbert Meyer volunteered to serve in the battalion as lowly Grenadier and was assigned as the commander of the first company. Meyer had been convicted of petty theft and embezzlement in November 1942 and was sent to the Danzig-Matzkau prison. He later served as the commander of the first battalion in Warsaw in August 1944 and remained in this position until the end of the war.

On 30 June 1944, the regiment reported a total strength of 17 officers and 954 men, including non-commissioned officers. This figure did not include the 769 upcoming volunteers from several concentration camps that would be sent to the SS-Ersatzkompanie Dirlewanger stationed in Minsk.

Anti-partisan operations continued until June 1944, when the Soviets launched Operation Bagration, which was aimed at the destruction of the Army Group Centre. The unit was caught up in the retreat and began falling back to the town of Lida. Under the Kampfgruppe von Gottberg, the unit held their position against the Soviets so that the remaining retreating Germans would have the time to fall back to safety. The regiment sustained heavy casualties during several rearguard actions and were detached from Kampfgruppe von Gottberg on 20 July 1944, being sent to East Prussia for reconstitution at the Arys training center in the town of Lyck. The Sonderregiment arrived on 21 July 1944, and reorganised the regiment after receiving replacements for their casualties. In late July 1944, Dirlewanger left the regiment and flew to Berlin to lobby Gottlob Berger for more troops and equipment. The command of the regiment was given temporarily to SS-Hauptsturmführer Kurt Weisse. Command was returned to Dirlewanger when he flew back from Germany in August 1944.

=== Return to Poland ===
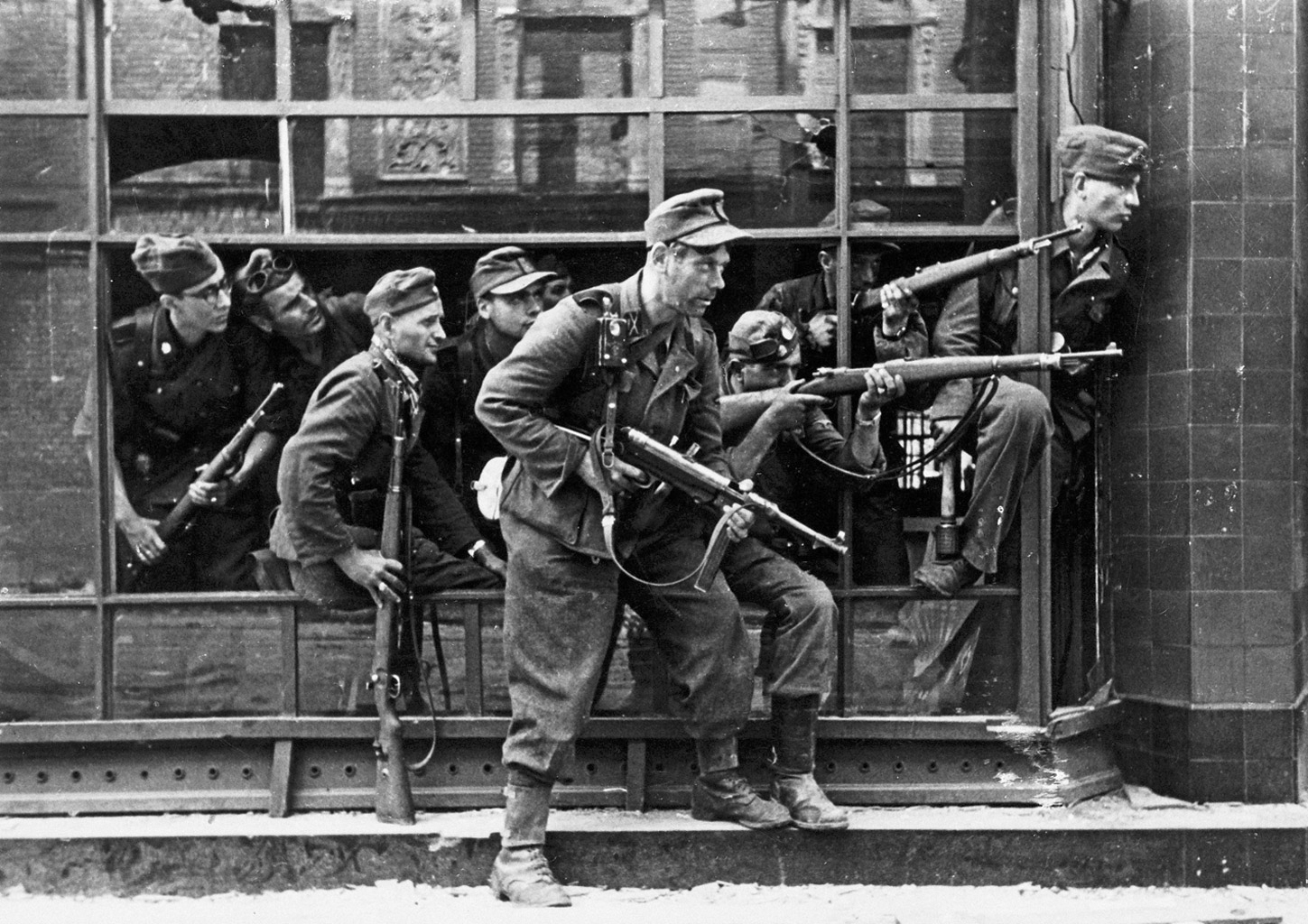
Members of the 2nd Battalion "Kampfgruppe Steinhauer" SS-Sonderregiment "Dirlewanger" in central Warsaw in 1944.

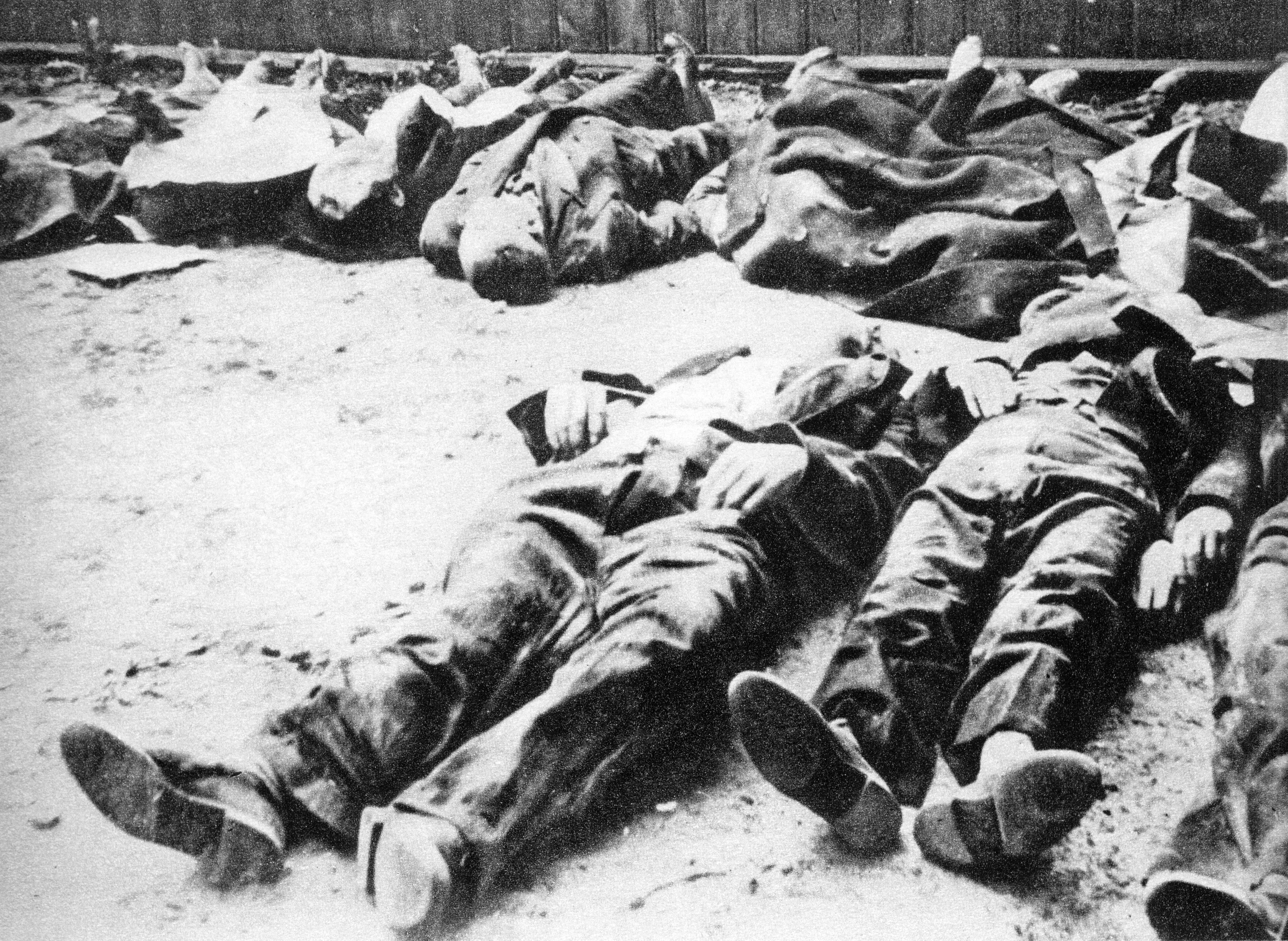
Polish civilians murdered in the Wola massacre in Warsaw, August 1944.

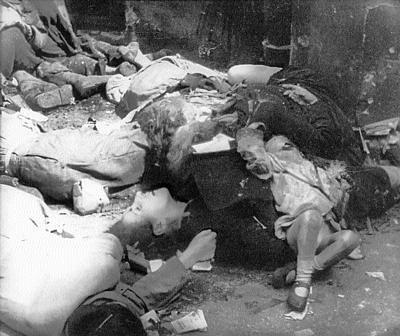
Photograph depicting Polish civilians murdered by SS forces during the Warsaw Uprising in the Wola district, August 1944.

When the Armia Krajowa began the Warsaw Uprising on 1 August 1944, SS-Sonderregiment Dirlewanger was sent into action under the command of SS-Sturmbannführer Kurt Weisse. They were part of the Kampfgruppe formation led by SS-Gruppenführer Heinz Reinefarth; once again serving alongside Bronislav Kaminski's militia (now named Waffen-Sturmbrigade RONA).

On 3 August 1944, the regiment was instructed to form a battalion-sized Kampfgruppen to support the suppression of the uprising. The first Kampfgruppe was formed out of the 1st Battalion and was named Kampfgruppe Meyer, with a strength of 356 men (excluding additional support troops). It was commanded by Herbert Meyer, who now had been fully rehabilitated. The second Kampfgruppe was formed from the regiment's 2nd Battalion and was named Kampfgruppe Steinhauer, led by Hauptmann der Schupo Josef Steinhauer, with a strength of 350 men. They arrived on 7 August 1944, and both Kampfgruppen were placed under the command of Reinefarth. On 4 August 1944, Kampfgruppe Meyer departed for Warsaw by truck and arrived that night at the western outskirts of the city, staying at Bernerowo Airfield. On the same day, Dirlewanger received a telegram directly from Reichsführer-SS Himmler which read:

Although I am very satisfied with your actions, as I recently told you personally, I must express my dissatisfaction that, despite the instruction to proceed immediately to your regiment by airplane – which had been prepared for you – you still wasted time in Berlin. I am accustomed to quick and immediate obedience.

Dirlewanger then traveled to East Prussia by car and reunited with a portion of his regiment, which had prepared to depart for Warsaw. Without further hesitation, Dirlewanger sought additional soldiers and equipment to reinforce his unit. This included attempts to gather men from military prisons and SS penal camps in locations such as Glatz (Kłodzko), Anklam, Torgau, Danzig-Matzkau, and Dachau, where Dirlewanger received an additional 2,400 men on September 24, 1944.

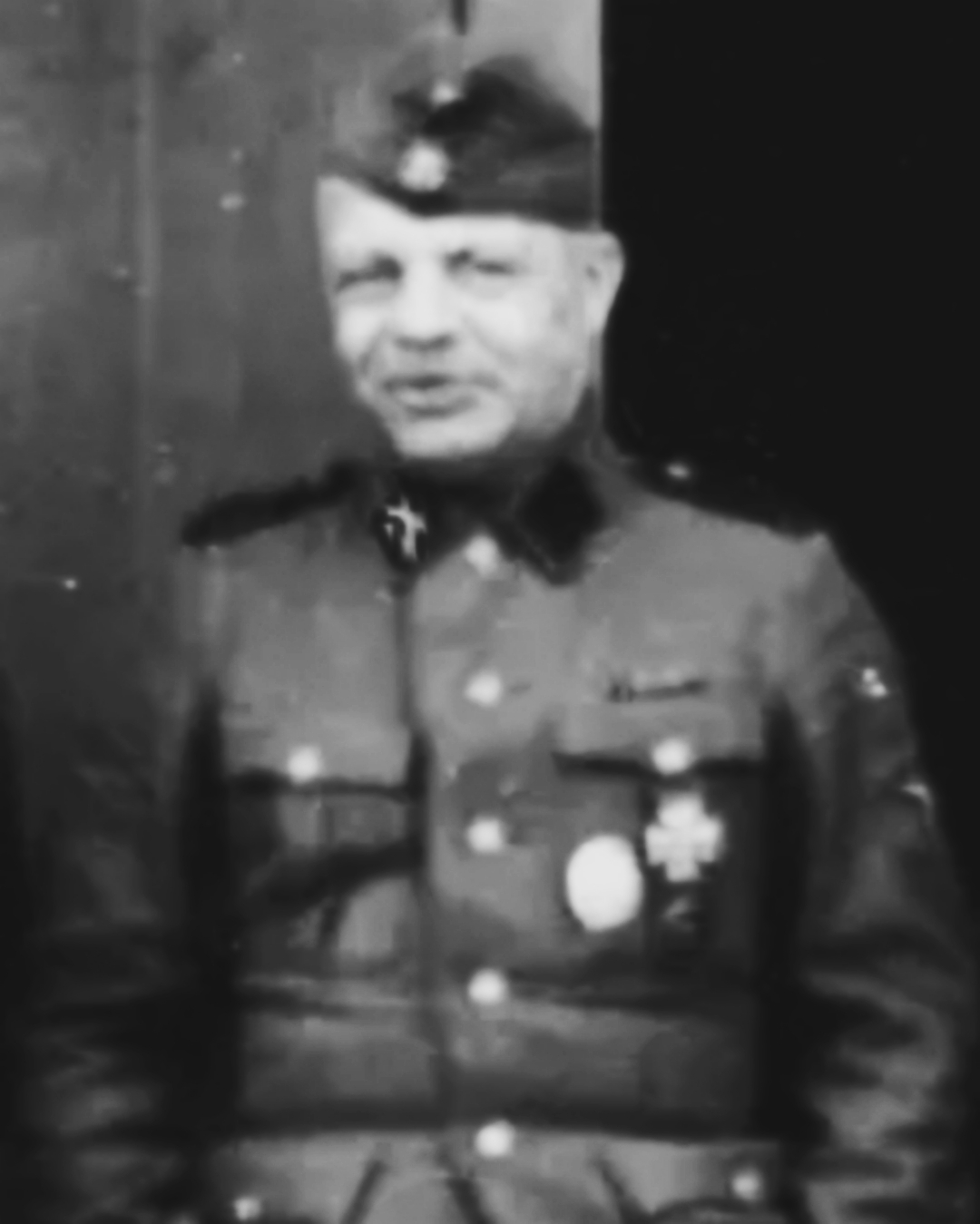
Herbert Meyer, who commanded the 1st Company and later I. Battalion "Kampfgruppe Meyer" in Warsaw, photographed as an SS-Grenadier, circa April/May 1944.

On 5 August 1944, under the leadership of Weisse, Kampfgruppe Meyer began their assault on the Wola district, advancing along the Litzmannstadt-Strasse, while the Posen Police Group advanced north of the street. The assault was delayed and continued into the night due to the street being heavily defended.

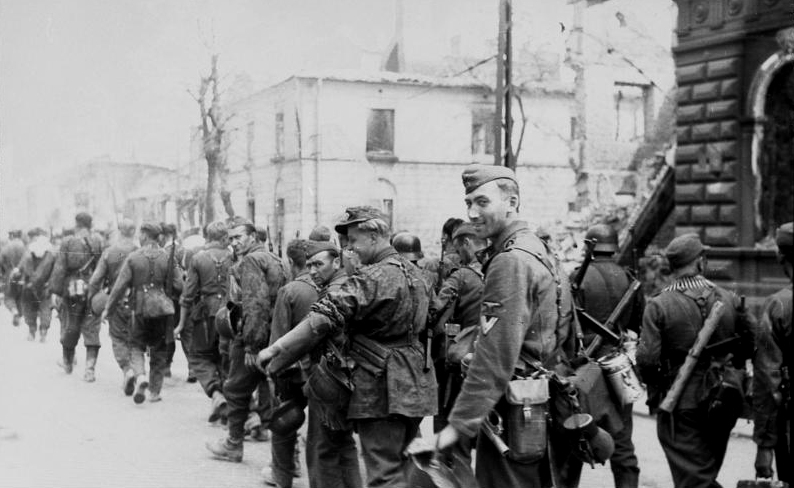
Recently arrived troops from II. Battalion, 'Kampfgruppe Steinhauer,' that arrived on 7 August 1944, notably by large without helmets, which was a common practice among Dirlewanger's troops.

On 6 August 1944, Kampfgruppe Steinhauer arrived in Warsaw and, along with Kampfgruppe Meyer, immediately began their attack to reach the Brühl Palace. They eventually had advanced through Chlodna street and Elektoralna street. On the evening of 7 August 1944, after receiving orders from Himmler to return to his regiment, Dirlewanger flew back from Germany and united the two Kampfgruppen to form Kampfgruppe Dirlewanger. By August 7 Dirlewanger had occupied the Saxon Gardens and had linked with other German troops on the Kierbedzia Bridge. The next day, they reached the palace and captured the Theatre Square. During the assault, several hospitals were burned down, sparing St. Stanisław Hospital for use as the regiment's headquarters.

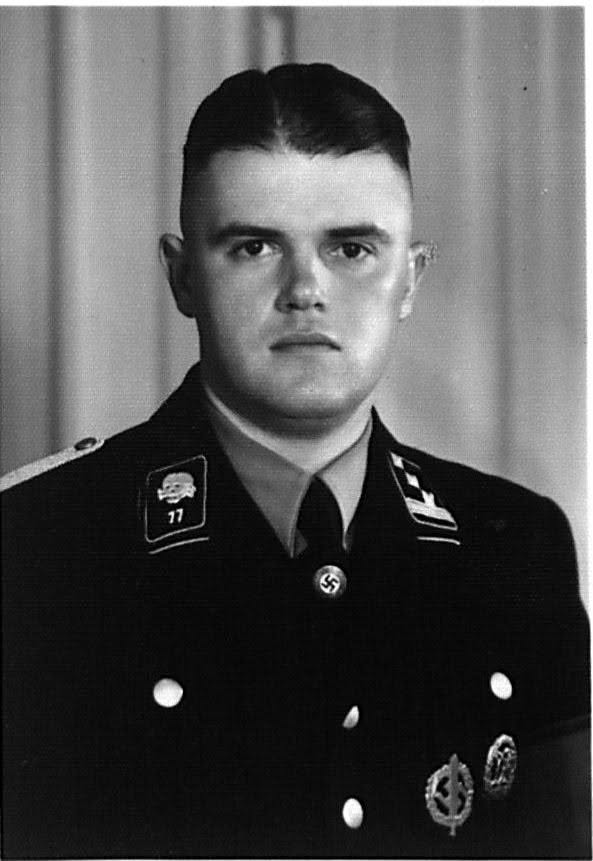
Kurt Weisse joined the Sonderbataillon Dirlewanger in July 1943 leading a company, later serving as an operations officer(Ia).

On 8 August 1944, SS-Untersturmführer Max Schreiner, an experienced member of the regiment, led a group of troops in an assault on the Market Hall. This decisive action led to the complete defeat of the retreating Polish insurgents. Schreiner's assault played a crucial role in the immediate capture of the Brühl Palace.

When most of its units—including headquarters, the heavy machine-gun company, heavy mortar company, and antitank gun platoon—finally arrived in Warsaw, the Sonderregiment submitted its first combat strength report on 8 August. It recorded 881 men present for duty, including 16 officers. This was three days after Kampfgruppe Meyer had begun fighting. After retaking the Brühl Palace and rescuing Warsaw battle commander Generalleutnant Reiner Stahel, the regiment regrouped that evening as Kampfgruppe Dirlewanger.

Dirlewanger, with the Waffen-Sturm-Brigade RONA, are notorious for being the two units which committed the worst crimes during the Warsaw Uprising. Dirlewanger had a reputation for burying women and children alive. A witness reported "drunken soldiers practicing Caesarean sections with bayonets".

During the massacres, Dirlewanger was notorious for plundering, with it being noted that:

The Dirlewangers' lust for plunder was so great that they severed fingers with a single slash if they spotted rings, so as not to waste time, picked out gold teeth with bayonets, and, while looting, killed each other out of greed.

In what became known as the Wola massacre, Dirlewanger personnel, along with police units under command of Heinz Reinefarth, massacred Polish combatants along with civilian men, women and children, in the Wola District of Warsaw. However, the role of Dirlewanger in the Wola massacre itself may have been limited in the beginning days, and Dirlewanger may not have arrived himself until the 7th of August. Up to 40,000 civilians were murdered in Wola in less than two weeks of August, including all hospital patients and staff. According to the historian Alex J. Kay, Dirlewanger murdered some 12,500 people on 5 August. Dirlewanger "burned prisoners alive with gasoline, impaled babies on bayonets and stuck them out of windows and hung women upside down from balconies". Polish nurses were repeatedly raped, and in some instances, hand grenades were inserted into their vaginas and detonated, while other times a "shouting and flute concerto" followed with the driving of women to the gallows. Historian Jesús Hernández wrote that "They attacked hospitals and murdered patients in their beds, sometimes using flamethrowers. Nurses and nuns suffered, if possible, an even worse fate: they were flogged, gang-raped, and hanged naked." In Warsaw, Dirlewanger and his unit killed at least 12,500, and up to 30,000 people, most of them non-combatants.

The role of Dirlewanger during the Wola massacre has been debated. German prosecutors who investigated the war crimes committed during the suppression of the uprising concluded that Dirlewanger could only be held exclusively responsible for 16 of the 41 mass executions carried out in the Wolkastrasse area (most likely referring to Wolska Street). The Dirlewanger men are known to have executed prisoners and civilians in buildings they had captured, and it is possible that they participated in other mass executions that took place behind the front lines. Hubert Kuberski suggests, however, that due to the small size of Meyer's battalion (365 men) and its primary objective of fighting insurgents and securing Wola's arterial roads, Meyer's battalion could not have played a pivotal role in the extermination of Wola's inhabitants, although that does not rule out the participation of Steinhauer's battalion in these acts, or the involvement of regimental headquarters troops. SS-Brigadeführer Ernst Rode, Erich von dem Bach-Zelewski's chief of staff, testified post-war that Dirlewanger received a handwritten order from Himmler. The order, issued in Hitler's name, instructed Dirlewanger to destroy Warsaw and granted him the authority to "kill anyone he wished, as he pleased".

Many otherwise unknown crimes committed by the unit in Warsaw were later revealed by Mathias Schenck, a Belgian national who was serving in the area as a German Army sapper. Regarding an incident in which hundreds of Polish children were murdered, Schenck stated:

We blew up the doors, I think of a school. Children were standing in the hall and on the stairs. Lots of children. All with their small hands up. We looked at them for a few moments until Dirlewanger ran in. He ordered to kill them all. They shot them, and then they were walking over their bodies and breaking their little heads with butt-ends. Blood and brain matter streamed down the stairs. There is a memorial plaque in that place stating that 350 children were killed. I think there were many more, maybe 500.

Schenck noted the often mass rape of female civilians in cellars and basements, highlighting an incident where the men of the brigade raided a cellar, and the subsequent brutal murder of a Polish girl:

Every time, when we stormed the cellars and women were inside the Dirlewanger soldiers raped them. Many times a group raped the same woman, quickly, still holding weapons in their hands. Then after one of the fights, I was standing shaking by the wall and couldn't calm my nerves. Dirlewanger soldiers burst in. One of them took a woman. She was pretty. She wasn't screaming. Then he was raping her, pushing her head strongly against the table, holding a bayonet in the other hand. First he cut open her blouse. Then one cut from stomach to throat. Blood gushed.

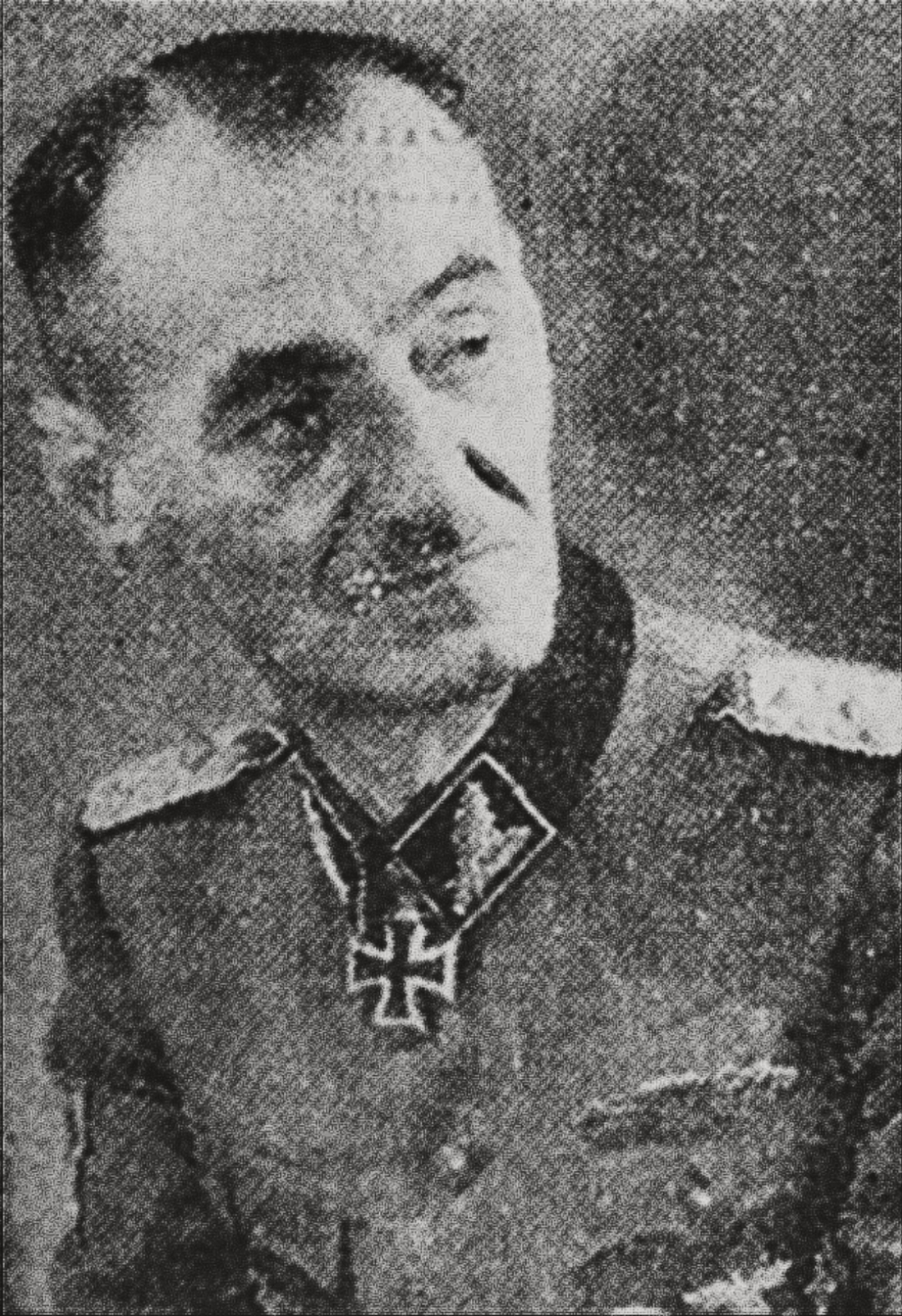
SS-Oberführer Oskar Dirlewanger in November 1944.

The regiment arrived in Warsaw with only 865 enlisted personnel and 16 officers, but it soon received 2,500 replacements. These included 1,900 German convicts from the SS military camp at Danzig-Matzkau. Extremely high casualties were inflicted on the unit during fighting in Warsaw by the Polish resistance. During the course of the two-month urban warfare Dirlewanger's regiment lost 2,733 men, 315% of the unit's initial strength. While some of the regiment's actions were criticized by Erich von dem Bach-Zelewski (who after the war described them as "a herd of pigs") and the sector commander, Generalmajor Günter Rohr, Dirlewanger was promoted to SS-Oberführer der Reserve on 12 August 1944 and was recommended for the Knight's Cross of the Iron Cross on 30 September 1944 by Reinefarth. He received the medal on 16 October 1944 at a reception hall of the Wawel Royal Castle in Krakow; it was presented by Hans Frank. The SS newspaper publishing house Das Schwarze Korps published a press notice about Dirlewanger receiving the Knight's Cross on 16 November 1944:

The road of the 49 years old SS-Oberführer Oskar Dirlewanger was always the battle against destruction and Bolshevism. He fought in several Freikorps, led the armored train against Max Hölz and belonged to the Condor Legion. When you see him you cannot tell that he has been wounded eleven times, once very severely during World War I. In this war he has been so successful in leading his unit against Bolshevik bandits that the Soviets put a high price on his head. When the insurrection in Warsaw started, SS-Oberführer Dirlewanger led his men in the battle for houses and streets of the city with unbelievable severity and tenacity. The Führer rewarded their fighting and the personal combat of their commander by awarding the Knight's Cross of the Iron Cross to SS-Oberführer Dirlewanger.

In gratitude for the presentation of the award, Dirlewanger wrote to Hitler's SS Adjutant, Hauptsturmführer Otto Günsche, three weeks later and told him:

[Y]ou know as well as I do that I received this high award for the soldierly achievements of my regiment, among other things. With this, the last unwelcome voices from "higher places" about my unit should have faded away! My men have achieved superhuman things in this fight to the death and destruction and have earned themselves a place in the honor book of the German soldier by their sweat, blood, and heroic sacrificial commitment!

During one fierce fight on 6 August 1944, Dirlewanger's men used civilians as body shields:

Dirlewanger's men spread out along the square and with armor support, rooted out several insurgent positions. Then the Sonderkommando attempted to advance further using a shield of Polish women and children in front of them – but the Poles fired anyway and drove the Germans back.

By 3 October 1944, the remaining Polish insurgents had surrendered and the remnants of the regiment spent the next month guarding the line along the Vistula. During this time, the regiment was unofficially referred as a "brigade" in the message traffic.

The journalist and history writer Nigel Cawthorne noted how Dirlewanger committed worse atrocities than the Kaminski Brigade, and how they enjoyed committing them:

Encouraged by their commander SS-Oberführer Oskar Dirlewanger, who told them to take no prisoners, the Dirlewanger troops looted, gang-raped women and children, played 'bayonet catch' with live babies and tortured captives by hacking off their arms, dousing them with petrol and setting them alight to run flaming down the street. The soldiers' behavior was so bad that even Himmler became alarmed. He ordered a battalion of SS military policemen to stand by, in case the Dirlewanger troops turned on their own leaders or on nearby German units.

=== Slovakia ===
The regiment played a large part in putting down the rebellion by 30 October. The unit was still considered under strength even after having grown into a four-battalion force, prompting Dirlewanger to seek additional manpower. Before their departure from Warsaw, the strength of the unit was slightly under 4500 men, having gained nearly 2000 probationary troops from Wehrmacht prisons, detention facilities and punishment cells.

On 7 October, Dirlewanger toured several concentration camps in search of recruits for his under strength unit. During his visit to the Flossenbürg Concentration Camp, he met with the camp's commandant, SS-Sturmbannführer Egon Zill. Zill proposed an idea to Dirlewanger: to recruit Communist and Socialist prisoners into his ranks. SS-Gruppenführer Richard Glück and SS-Standartenführer Hermann Pister had also advised Dirlewanger to try to form a unit consisting of former political opponents of the Nazi Party. Dirlewanger wrote a letter to Himmler, requesting approval for the idea of recruiting political prisoners into his unit. On 15 October 1944, Himmler approved the request.

With the Slovak National Uprising still ongoing, the regiment was deployed to Slovakia. According to Hermann Höfle, the regiment was sent to Slovakia upon the expressed request of Gottlob Berger. On 10 October 1944, they began to move toward Slovakia on trains, and reached Nitra by 12 October. On 16 October 1944, elements of the regiment were strafed and bombed by several LaGG-5 planes belonging to the Slovak Air Force near the train station at Diviaky. On the same day, Dirlewanger received his long-awaited Knight's Cross in Krakow. On 18 October 1944, the regiment launched an assault to capture the area near Ostro Mountain. Two days later, they renewed the attack but made little to no progress against the determined defenders. On 25 October, the regiment finally succeeded in capturing the towns of Biely Potok and Necpaly after intense fighting. Between 27 and 30 October, the regiment continued its operations, engaging in relentless combat against Slovak partisans in the surrounding areas. By 30 October, Banská Bystrica had been fully taken, and the resistance had been completely crushed, allowing the regiment to continue their formation in the town of Revúca. As part of their usual anti-partisan duties, the regiment proceeded to eliminate any remaining small elements of partisans who had fled into the surrounding areas. The SS-Sonderregiment Dirlewanger was recognized as a brigade on 13 November 1944 by the SS-Führungshauptamt, and it was retitled as SS-Sturmbrigade Dirlewanger. However, it was only official on paper and only came fully into effect in December. Eventually, the Brigade received new officers to fill its leadership positions in the newly raised regiment.

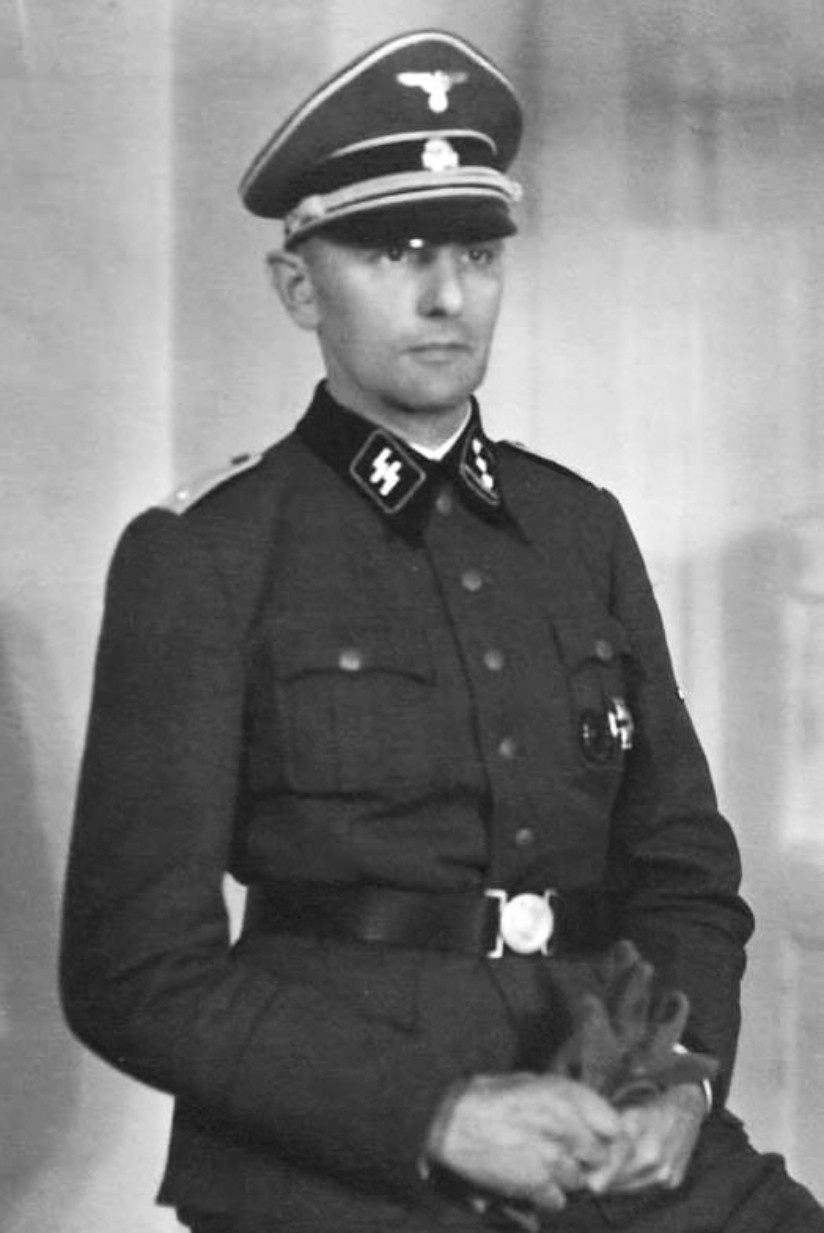
Wilhelm Stegmann in 1944.

Among them was Wilhelm Stegmann, a former SA-Gruppenführer and Nazi politician who had been charged with attempting to assassinate his political rival, Julius Streicher. On 1 October 1944, Stegmann was drafted into the SS to expunge his criminal record and “restore his honor,” and was temporarily assigned to the SS-Hauptamt as an SS-Obersturmführer der Reserve. One month later, he was transferred to the brigade and subsequently appointed commander of the I. Battalion of SS-Sturmregiment 2. Another officer who volunteered to serve as a battalion commander in the new regiment was Kurt Nitschkowski, a former Luftwaffe Flak Oberstleutnant. Nitschkowski had been demoted to the rank of SS-Grenadier for abuse of authority, neglect of duty, unlawful use of weapons, bodily harm, and insubordination, and was sentenced to six months in prison before volunteering for frontline service in the Brigade.

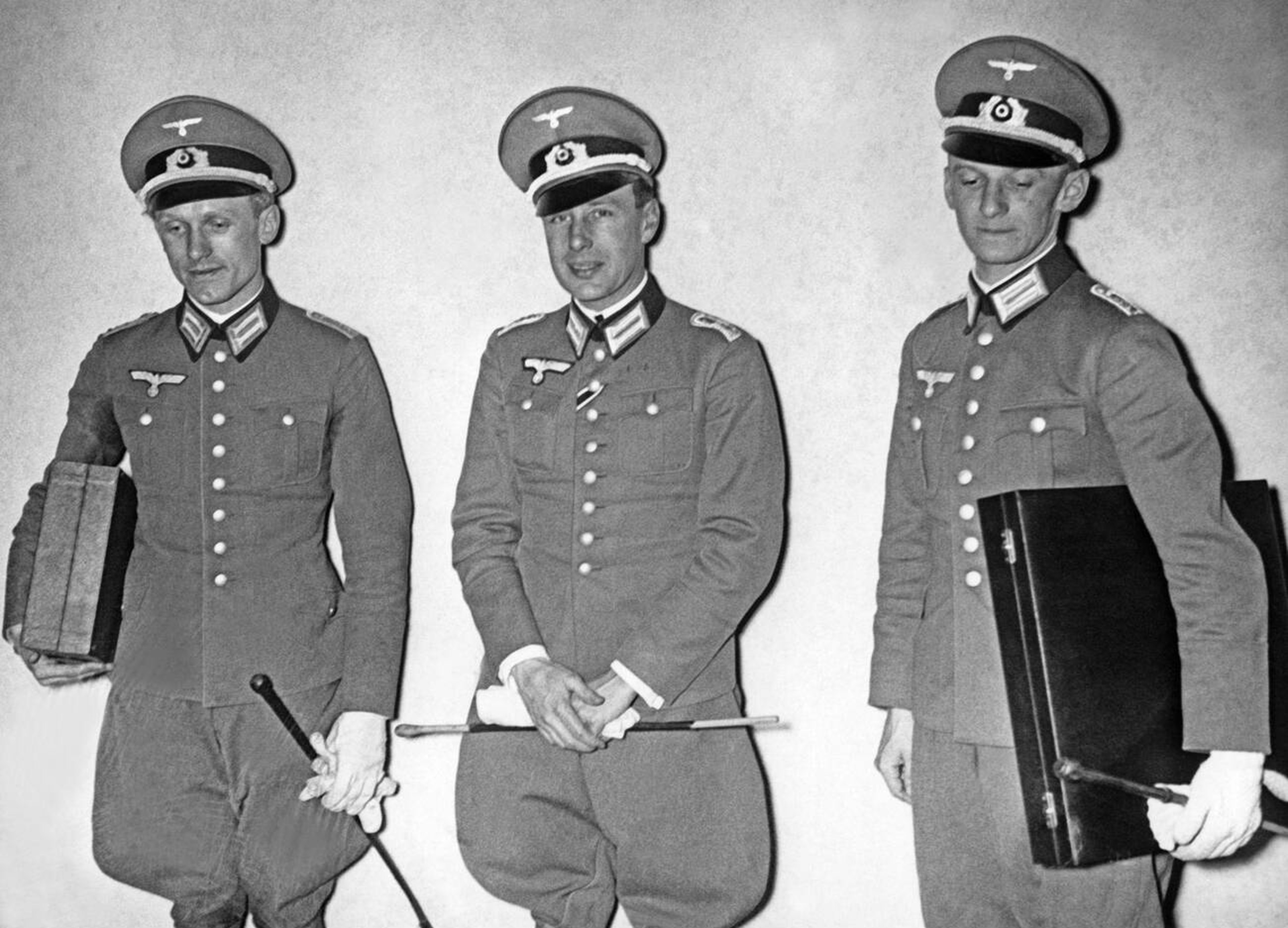
Harald Momm (Middle) as an Oberst.

Officers who were suspected of having ties to the 20 July plot were also sent to the brigade. One example was Oberst Harald Momm, a famous German show jumper who was arrested by the Gestapo for expressing his disappointment over the failed assassination attempt on Adolf Hitler. As a result, he was sentenced to death but was granted a reprieve on the condition that he serve in the SS-Sturmbrigade Dirlewanger, which he accepted. There, he was demoted to SS-Hauptsturmführer and served as a company commander in the 5th Company of SS-Sturmregiment 2.

By November 1944, the command structure of the regiment's infantry unit are as below:

Position	Name	Rank
Commander	Oskar Dirlewanger	SS-Oberführer
SS-Sturmregiment-1	Kurt Weisse	SS-Sturmbannführer
1. Battalion	Herbert Meyer	SS-Obersturmführer
2. Battalion	Josef Steinhauer	Major der Schupo
3. Battalion	Siegfried Pollack	SS-Untersturmführer
SS-Sturmregiment-2	Erich Buchmann	SS-Obersturmbannführer
1. Battalion	Wilhelm Stegmann	SS-Obersturmführer
2. Battalion	Ewald Ehlers	SS-Hauptsturmführer
3. Battalion	Kurt Nitzkowski (acting commander)	Grenadier
Mixed Battalion	Walter Ehlers	SS-Hauptsturmführer

With the outcome of the war no longer in doubt, large numbers of communist and socialist political prisoners began applying to join the unit in the hopes of defecting to the Soviets.

On 3 November 1944, the SS Main Economic and Administrative Office had issued quotas to all primary Nazi concentration camps for the suitable selection of political prisoners. The quota for political prisoner volunteers, that totalled up to 1910 men are as follows:

Concentration camp	Quota
Auschwitz	400
Buchenwald	150
Dachau	300
Flossenbürg	45
Gross-Rosen	30
Mauthausen	10
Neuengamme	130
Ravensbrück	80
Sachsenhausen	750
Stutthof	15

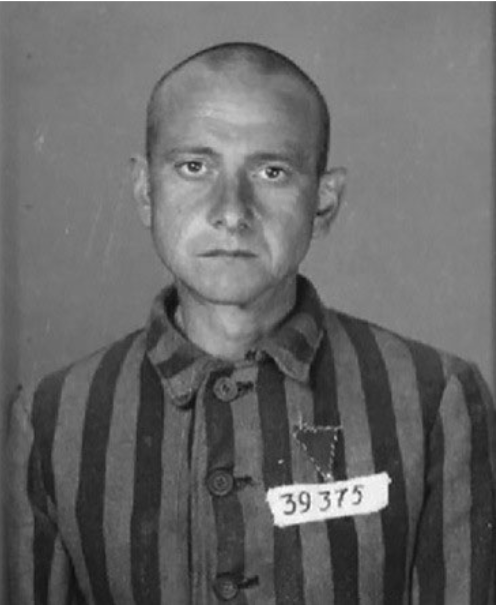
SS-Grenadier August Kaufeld, a political prisoner from the Auschwitz Concentration Camp, who among the 770 political prisoners volunteered for Sturmbrigade Dirlewanger.

The recruitment process underwent for first two weeks of November. Only 770 volunteers from all of the camps are accepted as recruited. To make up the missing 1,140 men, Dirlewanger recruited a mix of asocial elements and career criminals, bringing the total number of recruits to the targeted 1,910. The political prisoners received their training in either Krakow or Mošovce. The recruitment process in each concentration camp varied based on the personality of the commanding SS officer.

For example, on 17 November in Sachsenhausen Concentration Camp, those deemed suitable for recruitment were given a choice: either volunteer for frontline service with Sonderregiment Dirlewanger or be executed with a single shot to the back of the neck. According to one witness:

“Since we did not wish to die, we volunteered against our will.”

Unlike what happened in Sachsenhausen, other camps sought to appeal to the political prisoners' patriotism, their pride in their “Germanness,” and their sense of duty to defend their families against the dangers posed by the approaching enemy. In Neuengamme, on 5 November 1944, the political prisoners who had been accepted for service with Dirlewanger were called to roll call. While they remained in formation, the SS guards brought out Franz Hobelsberger, a former inmate from Sachsenhausen who had served with Dirlewanger before deserting. He was led from his cell to a gallows erected in the center of the roll call square, where he was executed as an example and a warning to the political prisoners who were about to depart.

By this point, Sachsenhausen was being used as the reception facility for political prisoners. Upon arrival, they were issued used uniforms and boots, along with SS pay books and marching rations, before being transported by train to Krakow on 10 November 1944, where the SS-Ersatzkompanie Dirlewanger (Replacement Company) had been established. They were constantly kept under armed guard and confined in their living quarters surrounded by barbed wire as a way to prevent them from deserting. Although treated as criminals, the political prisoners were well-behaved and obedient compared to other concentration inmates that caused trouble due to their criminality.

During its activation and counter-insurgency operations in Slovakia, the brigade engaged in widespread criminal misconduct, including looting, rape, and selling weapons to partisans, actively destabilizing the region and drawing harsh condemnation from other SS commanders. Despite being tasked with security, the brigade's extreme depredations against the local population were so severe that some officers claimed the Dirlewanger troops acted "worse than partisans."

=== Hungary ===
On 9 December 1944, Hermann Höfle, the overall German commander of Slovakia and Höherer SS- und Polizeiführer (HSSPF), received urgent orders via telephone from General der Panzertruppen Walther Wenck at the OKH to defend the strategic narrows of Ipolyság. Adolf Hitler had personally designated this narrow gap with a black line on his maps, marking it as a critical priority to prevent the Soviet IX Guards Mechanized Corps from reaching the Upper Hungarian Plain. While Panzer Division Tatra was originally considered for the mission, its deployment was prohibited for political and training reasons, as it was required to defend the approaches to Bratislava. Consequently, Höfle ordered the immediate transfer of the SS-Sturmbrigade Dirlewanger to the endangered frontier. On 10 December, Oskar Dirlewanger reported to the headquarters of Army Group South in Dobogókő, where he explicitly warned the staff that he "could not fight the Soviets with Communists," referring to the 770 political prisoners recently recruited into his battalions.

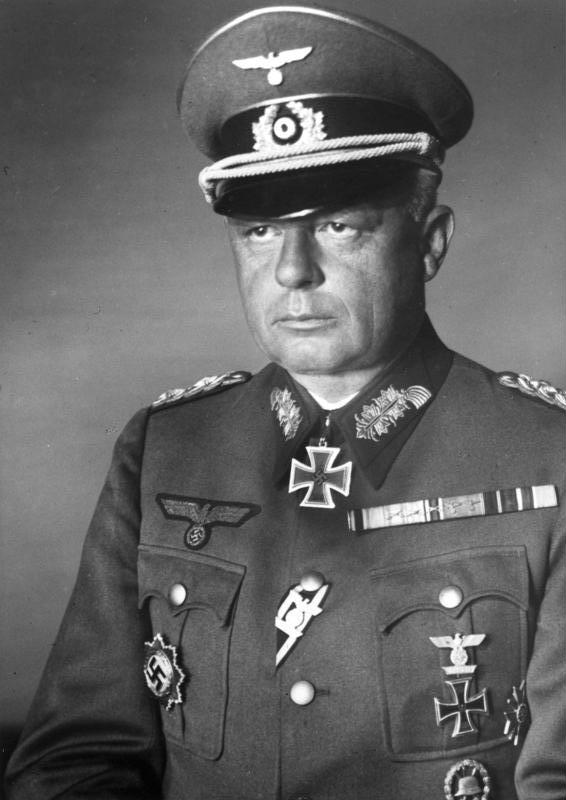
Generaloberst Johannes Friessner, Commander-in-Chief of Army Group South, who visited Dirlewanger's command post during the Battle of Ipolysag on 15 December 1944.

On 14 December 1944, Soviet forces advancing from Hont launched an assault and surrounded the town of Ipolyság, eventually capturing it. At the time, the town was defended by only 60 lightly armed men from the 3rd Company of the Mixed Battalion which had been subordinated to SS-Sturmregiment-2. The next day, on 15 December 1944, the two battalions — 2./SS-Sturmregiment-2 and 3./SS-Sturmregiment-2 — were positioned in the hills south of Ipolyság. On the morning of the following day, an artillery barrage was directed at their position by Soviet forces. Soon after, a dozen tanks began attacking the 2nd Battalion, but then shifted their assault toward the 3rd Battalion's position. Suddenly, almost every soldier from every company jumped from their trenches and threw their weapons away. This was a mass desertion that had been planned in November. The two battalions' leadership were left dumbfounded by what had just happened, and it was decided that the two battalions were to retreat to the area between Bernecebaráti and Kemence. Over 300 men defected to the Red Army during the battle, most of them were political prisoners recruited by Dirlewanger in November.

In the morning of 15 December 1944, shortly after the battle had begun, Generaloberst Johannes Friessner, the commander-in-chief of the Army Group South and Dirlewanger's superior, decided to visit Dirlewanger's Command Post in Palást. He was unimpressed. He described Dirlewanger as "a not very appealing adventurer type," sitting calmly behind his desk with a pet monkey on his shoulder. When questioned about the current situation, Dirlewanger did not know where the front line was, nor was he aware of the status of Buchmann's operation. Dirlewanger's adjutant, Kurt Weisse made a better impression with his acknowledgement about the frontline and the current situation.

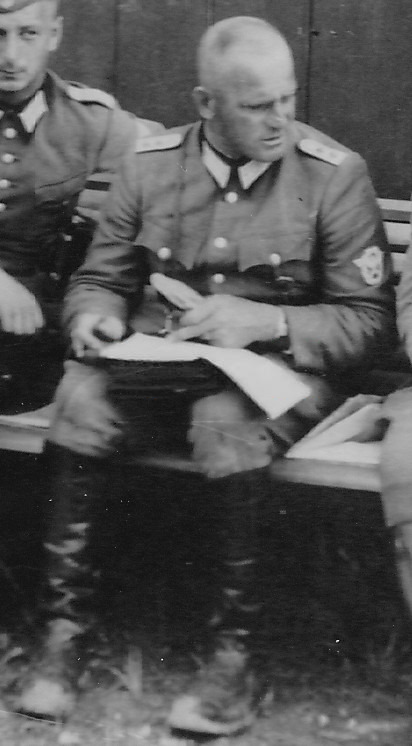
Franz Falter, commander of II. Battalion/SS-Sturmregiment 2 replacing Ewald Ehlers in mid-December 1944, photographed as a Major der Schutzpolizei in July 1941.

That same morning, Buchmann's command post was positioned east of Dolné Turovce. To his west, Steinhauer's battalion launched a counterattack to recapture Ipolyság. Meanwhile, to the east, Meyer's battalion and Pioneer Battalion 114 provided suppressing fire against Soviet positions at Magash and Somos to support Steinhauer's advance. At the same time, 3./SS-Sturmregiment-1, Polack's battalion, was redeploying to a new position along the Margarethe Line. The main brigade command post was located farther back at Horné Turovce, where all the brigade staff were stationed, including Dirlewanger and Weisse.

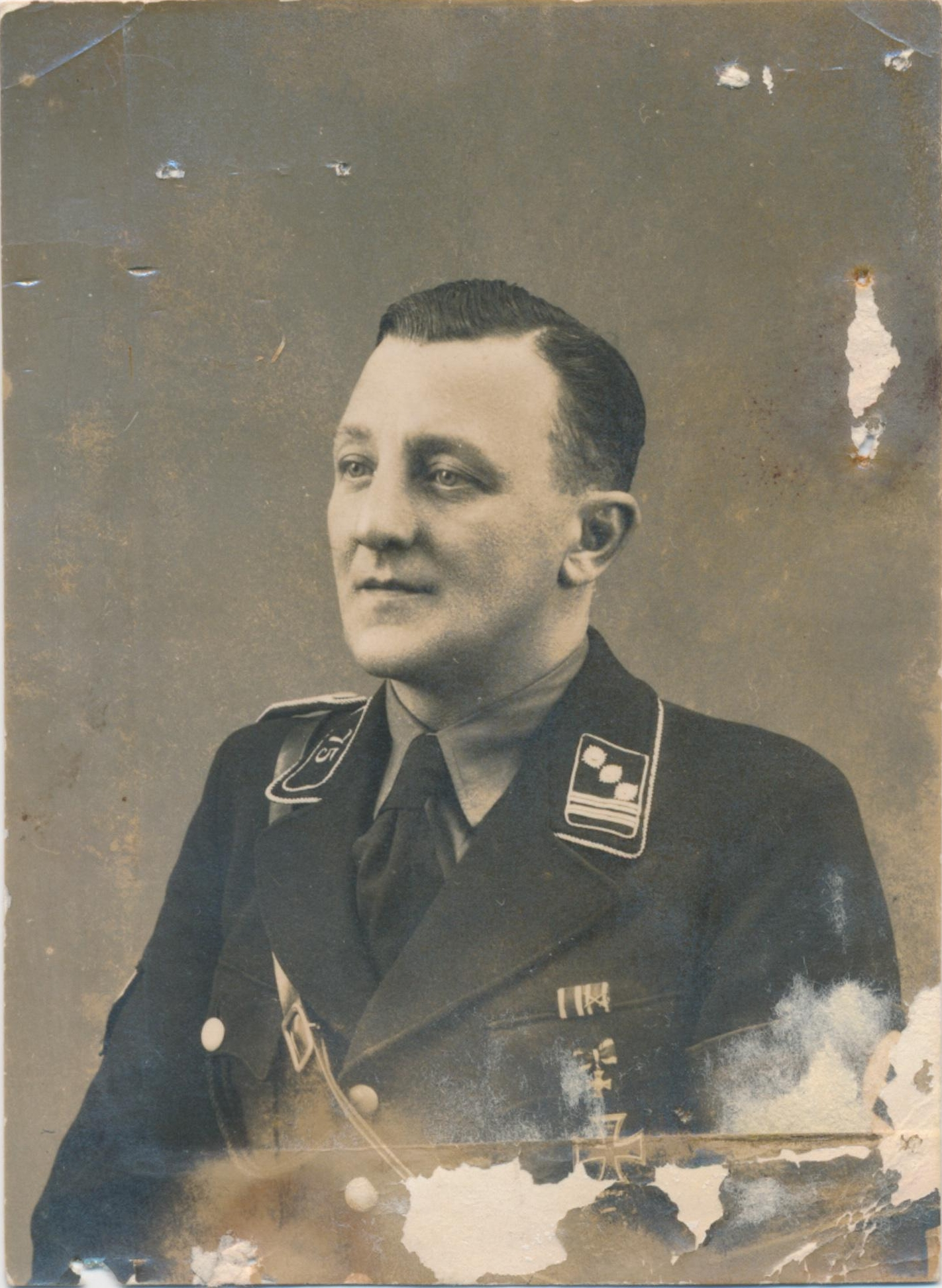
Erich Buchmann, commander of SS-Sturmregiment 2 and later SS-Sturmregiment 1, photographed as an SS-Hauptsturmführer before the war.

That evening, a single T-34 tank with several Soviet soldiers riding on it — possibly a reconnaissance team — was spotted at Steinhauer's left flank, moving directly toward Kistur, where Buchmann's command post was located. However, it was halted by defensive fire from the 2nd and 4th Companies of the Mixed Battalion, which had been stationed near Kistur in reserve to support Sturmregiment-2. Following the engagement, the two companies successfully blocked the tank's advance and drove off the accompanying infantry with concentrated fire. The tank, under increasing pressure, was forced to retreat.

The counterattack failed to materialize when Soviet forces launched a larger-scale assault from Ipolyság that same afternoon. The renewed offensive forced Steinhauer to retreat eastward toward Homáti. Meyer's battalion, along with the remnants of Pioneer Battalion 114, was also forced to withdraw far from their original positions. Buchmann's command post was heavily overrun, prompting its relocation to a new position south of Slatina.

In unclear circumstances, SS-Hauptsturmführer Harald Momm, found himself at the banks of the Kistompa River. There, he gathered retreating troops and formed a Kampfgruppe, which came to be known as Kampfgruppe Momm. Utilizing the regiment's field gun, the ad hoc unit managed to hold off the advancing Soviet tanks.

From 18 to 21 December, Soviet forces continued to gain ground steadily. Momm's position was eventually overrun, forcing his Kampfgruppe to retreat. The Soviet advance pushed dangerously close to Dirlewanger's main headquarters in Deménd. In response, Meyer's and Polack's battalions launched a counterattack, but it failed to achieve any significant results. During this period, Ehlers was reassigned from his role as a battalion commander to take command of SS-Sturmregiment-2, replacing Buchmann, who was in turn appointed to lead SS-Sturmregiment-1. On 19 December 1944, the brigade was officially titled as 2.SS-Sturmbrigade Dirlewanger. The brigade continued fighting throughout the entire month and was eventually withdrawn from the frontline on 31 December 1944. It spent the following month stationed in Bratislava.

=== Germany ===
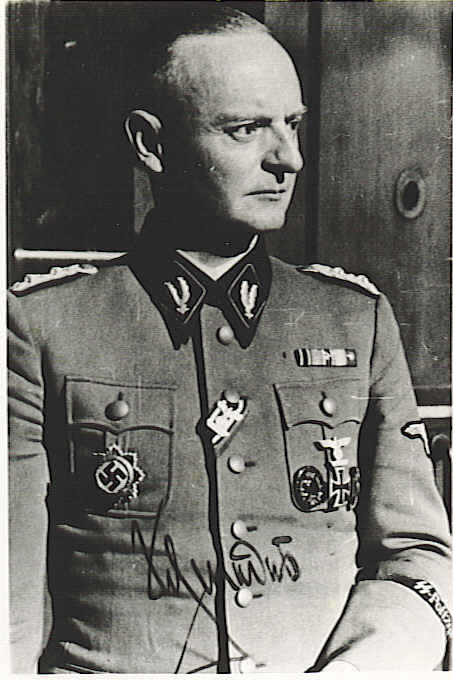
Fritz Schmedes, the last commander of the SS-Sturmbrigade Dirlewanger and later 36th Waffen Grenadier Division of the SS.

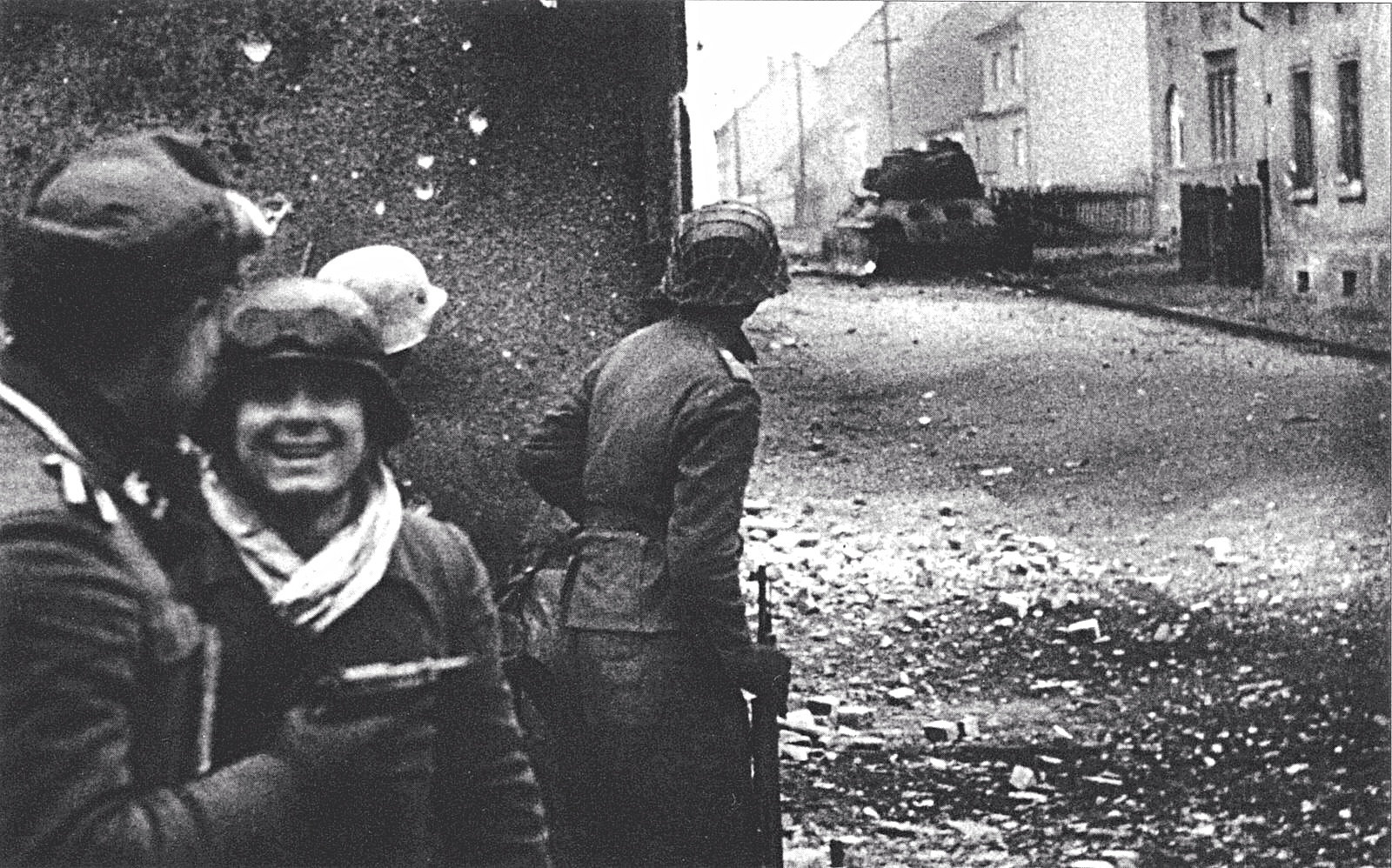
The destruction of the T-34 tank by SS-Sturmbrigade Dirlewanger in Guben, 22 February 1945.

By 2 January 1945, after the disastrous battle of Ipolysag, the 2.SS-Sturmbrigade Dirlewanger had a ration strength of only 2,489 men present for duty, less than half of its authorized strength of 6,500 men. On 2 February 1945, orders were given to the Sturmbrigade to be transferred to the Oder front. After moving through Dresden, the brigade arrived at their new assembly point in Guben and their assembly completed by 12 February 1945. On 14 February 1945, the brigade along with a regular army unit attached to it was committed to battle against the incoming Red Army. On 15 February 1945, the brigade was reported to have captured the villages of Sommerfeld, Christianstadt and Naumburg. On the same day, Dirlewanger was seriously wounded in combat for the twelfth time during the counterattack to recapture the town of Sommerfeld. He was sent to the rear and Schmedes took command; Dirlewanger would not return to the brigade. The element of the Red Army in Naumburg was repelled after combatting with the brigade the next day. On 17 February 1945, the brigade fought against a strong Soviet attack near Sommerfeld and destroyed a tank. After retaking Sommerfeld, the brigade and the 25th Panzer Division attacked the Red Army position in Bieniów. After the fighting, the Soviets were forced to retreat toward the Bóbr river and had to be recalled to the Neisse due to high losses.

On 18 February 1945, the SS-Sturmbrigade Dirlewanger was sent to the first line of the fighting toward the outskirt of Guben. On 20 February 1945, the brigade was attacking from the north and engaging in heavy combat with the 102nd Rifle Division. On that same day, the brigade and its attached army units were to be incorporated into a newly formed division. This would become effective on 1 March 1945, when both SS-Sturmbrigade Dirlewanger and its attached army units officially became a full division later known as the 36. Waffen Grenadier Division der SS. The regular army units attached to the formation were the 1244th Grenadier Regiment, the 2nd Battalion of the 687th Army Pioneer Brigade, two companies from the 681st Heavy Panzerjäger Battalion, and the newly raised 1st Panzer Battalion Stahnsdorf, including its two StuG companies equipped with 14 vehicles each. Individual Sturmpionier demolition engineers had already been attached to the force during the fighting in Warsaw.

On 22 February 1945, the outskirts of Guben were defended by the 1st Company of SS-Hauptsturmführer Momm's 2nd Battalion, part of SS-Sturmregiment 2. The unit came under attack from the Red Army, supported by two T-34 tanks, one of which advanced toward the town center. The commander of the 1st Company and his men eventually destroyed the tank. The action was filmed and later featured in the German newsreel 'Die Deutsche Wochenschau' No. 754. The following account is from the SS-Oberscharführer who led the company:

I released the safety on the bazooka, flipped the sight up, aimed at the tank – it may have been 30 meters away – and pushed the lever down. The grenade left a trail of smoke, hit the tank, and there, before my strained eyes, was an explosion, and then a heavy emission of smoke. I quickly ducked for cover before peeking through the empty window once again. The thing was still standing there smoking – nothing was moving. I had shot down a Russian tank. That was in the afternoon of February 22, 1945.

On 1 March 1945, the formation of the new division came into effect. Both the SS-Sturmbrigade Dirlewanger and its attached army units were officially reorganized into a full division, later designated as the 36. Waffen-Grenadier-Division der SS. The regular army units attached to the formation were the 1244th Grenadier Regiment, the 2nd Battalion of the 687th Army Pioneer Brigade, two companies from the 681st Heavy Panzerjäger Battalion, and the 1st Panzer Battalion, including its two StuG companies equipped with 14 vehicles each. Individual Sturmpionier demolition engineers had already been attached to the force during the fighting in Warsaw.

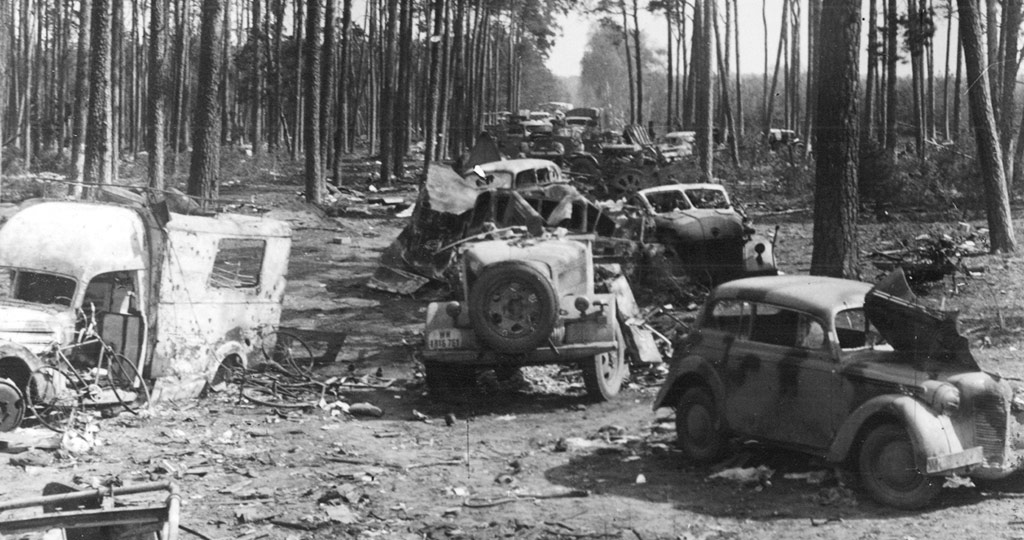
Abandoned vehicles at Halbe in April 1945.

The division was pushed back to the northeast when the final Soviet offensive began on 16 April 1945. Desertion became more and more common, and when Schmedes attempted to reorganize the division on 25 April, he found that it had virtually ceased to exist. On 28 April 1945, SS-Sturmbannführer Ewald Ehlers, who commanded the 73rd Waffen Grenadier Regiment was severely wounded and lost an arm during the battle in Halbe, according SS-Hauptsturmführer Harald Momm who commanded the II.battalion in Ehlers's regiment. On 1 May 1945, the Soviets wiped out all that was left of the unit in the Halbe pocket. Only a small remnant of the division managed an escape attempt to reach the US Army lines on the Elbe river. SS-Obersturmbannführer Kurt Weisse led a large group of around 400 men escaping from Halbe Pocket. He was later put in British captivity and escaped on 5 March 1946; his later fate is unknown. Schmedes and his staff (excluding Kurt Weisse) were taken prisoner in Soviet captivity. Schmedes was not charged with any crime and discharged shortly due to poor health. In June 1945, Dirlewanger was captured by French forces in Germany and died in their custody by 8 June, allegedly beaten to death by Polish soldiers in Altshausen.

== Orders of battle ==
SS Special Battalion Dirlewanger (8 June 1943)

- German Company
- Motorcycle Platoon
- Russian Companies (3)
- 1st Battery, SS-Polizei Artillerie Abteilung "Weissruthenien"

SS Special Battalion Dirlewanger (Summer 1943)

- Headquarters Company (Including motorcycle platoon)
- 1st (German) Company
- 2nd (Recruits) Company
- 3rd (Recruits) Company
- 4th (Russian) Company
- 5th (Russian) Company

Kampfgruppe Dirlewanger / SS Special Regiment Dirlewanger (August 1944)

- 1st Battalion "Meyer"
- 2nd Battalion "Steinhauer"
- 218th Assault Panzer Company
- 69th Cossack Battalion
- 200th Assault Gun Battalion
- 96th Motorized Sapper Battalion
- 1000th Assault Mortar Company
- Heavy Battery no. 688
- 200th Assault Gun Reserve Battalion
- 302nd Panzer Battalion
- 218th Assault Tank Company (Sturmpanzer IV)
- 638th Heavy Artillery Battery
- 201st Heavy Positional Mortars Battery
- Krone Flamethrower Battalion

SS Assault Brigade Dirlewanger (19 December 1944)

- Brigade staff
- SS-Assault Regiment 1
- SS-Assault Regiment 2
- Mixed-Battalion
- SS-Artillery Battalion Dirlewanger
- SS-Heavy Mörser Company
- Fusilier company
- Engineer company
- SS-Medical Company
- Signals company

36th Waffen Grenadier Division of the SS (March 1945)

- Division staff
- 72nd Waffen Grenadier Regiment of the SS
- 73rd Waffen Grenadier Regiment of the SS
- 1244th Volksgrenadier Regiment
- 36th Artillery Battalion
- 36th Fusilier Company
- Panzer Battalion Stahnsdorf 1
- II./687th Engineer Brigade (Heer)
- 2 Companies from 681st Heavy Panzerjäger Battalion (Heer)

== Designation history ==
Date	Title
14 June 1940 - 1 July 1940	Wilddiebkommando Oranienberg
1 July 1940 - 2 November 1942	SS-Sonderkommando Dirlewanger
2 November 1942 - 1 May 1944	SS-Sonderbataillon Dirlewanger
1 May 1944 - 13 November 1944	SS-Sonderregiment Dirlewanger
13 November 1944 - 19 December 1944	SS-Sturmbrigade Dirlewanger
19 December 1944 - 1 March 1945	2.SS-Sturmbrigade Dirlewanger
1 March 1945 - 29 April 1945	36. Waffen Grenadier Division der SS

== Legacy ==
The logo attributed to Dirlewanger is used by modern Neo-Nazis, such as the Wolfsbrigade 44. A Swedish neo-Nazi rock band named "Dirlewanger" were reportedly one of the Swedish neo-Nazi scene's most popular groups in the 1990's.

== See also ==
- Come and See
- List of military units named after people
- List of Waffen-SS units
- Ranks and insignia of the Waffen-SS

== Bibliography ==
- Nash, Douglas E. Sr. (2023). The Defeat of the Damned: The Destruction of the Dirlewanger Brigade at the Battle of Ipolysag, December 1944. Philadelphia: Casemate Publishers. ISBN 978-1-63624-211-8.
- (in German) Michaelis, Rolf – Das SS-Sonderkommando Dirlewanger: Ein Beispiel deutscher Besatzungspolitik in Weißrussland
- Klausch, Hans-Peter (1993). Antifaschisten in SS-Uniform: Schicksal und Widerstand der deutschen politischen KZ-Haftlinge, Zuchthaus- und Wehrmachtstrafgefangenen in der SS-Sonderformation Dirlewanger. Edition Temmen. pp. 592 pages. ISBN 3-86108-201-2.
- Kuberski, Hubert (March 2020). "The finale of a war criminal's existence: mysteries surrounding Oskar Dirlewanger's death – Studia z Dziejów Rosji i Europy Środkowo-Wschodniej". Studia z Dziejów Rosji i Europy Środkowo-Wschodniej. 54 (3): 225. doi:10.12775/SDR.2019.EN4.08. S2CID 216260243.
- Kuklinska, Soraya (2025). Oskar Dirlewanger: The Infamous War Criminal and His SS Sonderkommando. Schiffer Military History. pp. 432 pages. ISBN 978-0-7643-6988-9.
- Sawicki, Jerzy (1949). Zburzenie Warszawy. Zeznania generałów niemieckich przed polskim prokuratorem członkiem polskiej delegacji przy Międzynarodowym Trybunale Wojennym w Norymberdze [The Destruction of Warsaw: Testimonies of German Generals Before the Polish Prosecutor, a Member of the Polish Delegation to the Nuremberg International Military Tribunal] (in Polish). Warsaw: Kolumna.
