= Moszczanica =

- Village
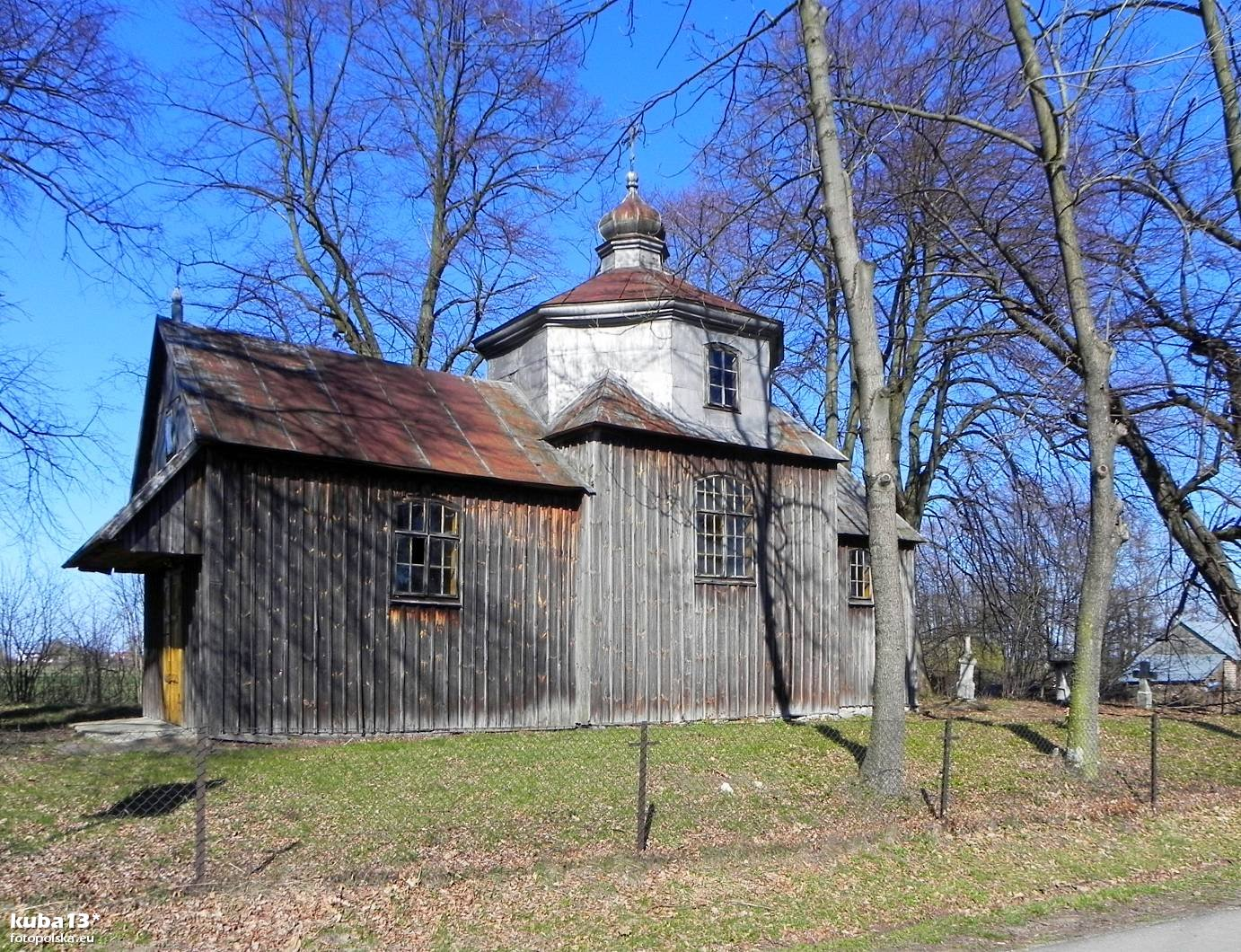
- Saint Archangel Michael Church

- Location within Poland
- Coordinates: 50°17′N 22°53′E
- Country: Poland
- Voivodeship: Subcarpathian
- County: Lubaczów
- Gmina: Stary Dzików
- Population: 560

Moszczanica [mɔʂt͡ʂaˈɲit͡sa] is a village in the administrative district of Gmina Stary Dzików, within Lubaczów County, Subcarpathian Voivodeship, in south-eastern Poland.
