= Nowy Dzików =

- Village
- Location within Poland
- Coordinates: 50°13′N 22°58′E
- Country: Poland
- Voivodeship: Subcarpathian
- County: Lubaczów
- Gmina: Stary Dzików

Nowy Dzików [ˈnɔvɨ ˈd͡ʑikuf] is a village in the administrative district of Gmina Stary Dzików, within Lubaczów County, Subcarpathian Voivodeship, in south-eastern Poland.
