= Cewków =

- Village
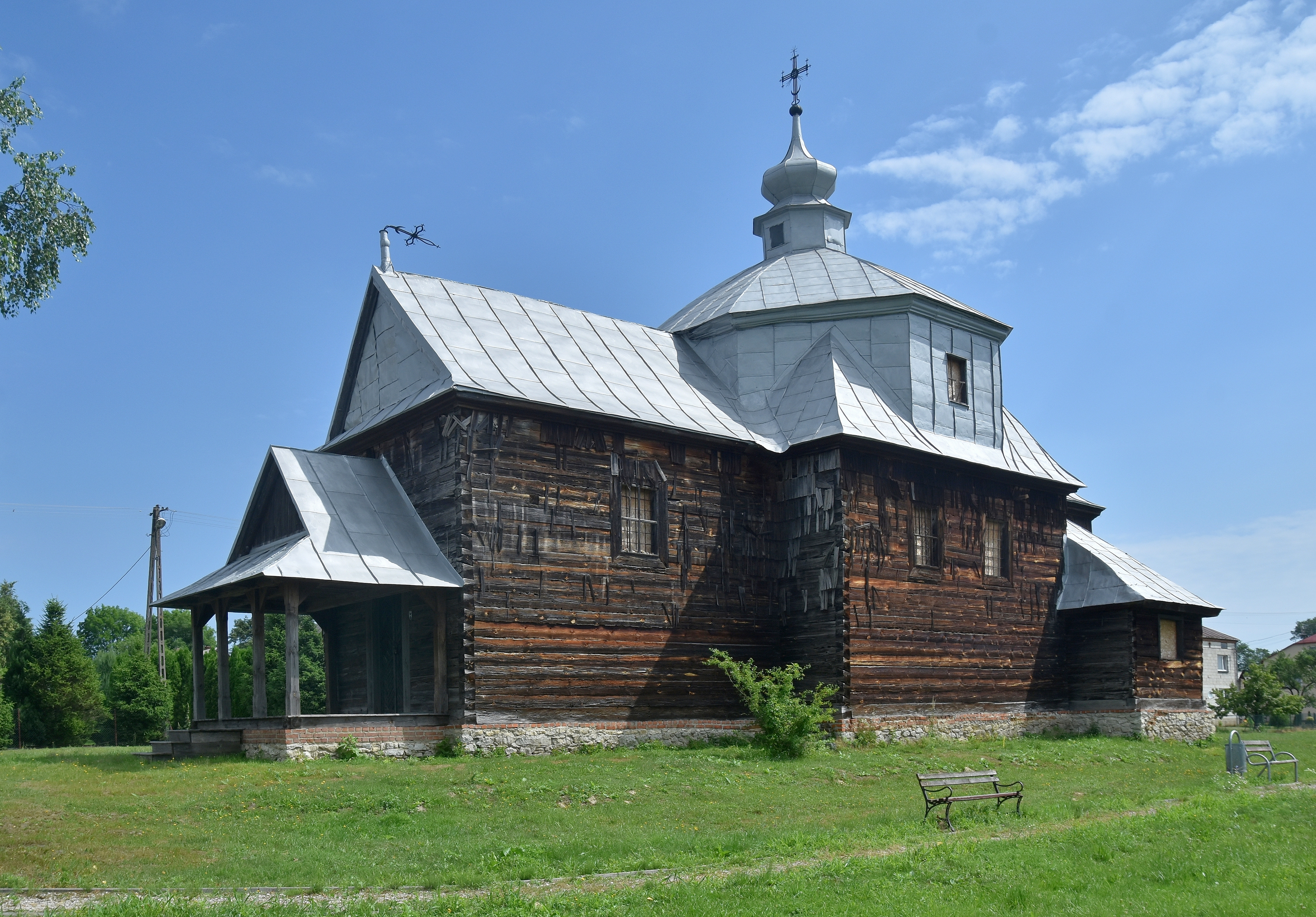
- Church of Saint Demetrius

- Location within Poland
- Coordinates: 50°15′N 22°52′E
- Country: Poland
- Voivodeship: Subcarpathian
- County: Lubaczów
- Gmina: Stary Dzików

Population
  - Total: 1,800

Cewków [ˈt͡sɛfkuf] is a village in the administrative district of Gmina Stary Dzików, within Lubaczów County, Subcarpathian Voivodeship, in south-eastern Poland.
