= Ułazów =

- Village
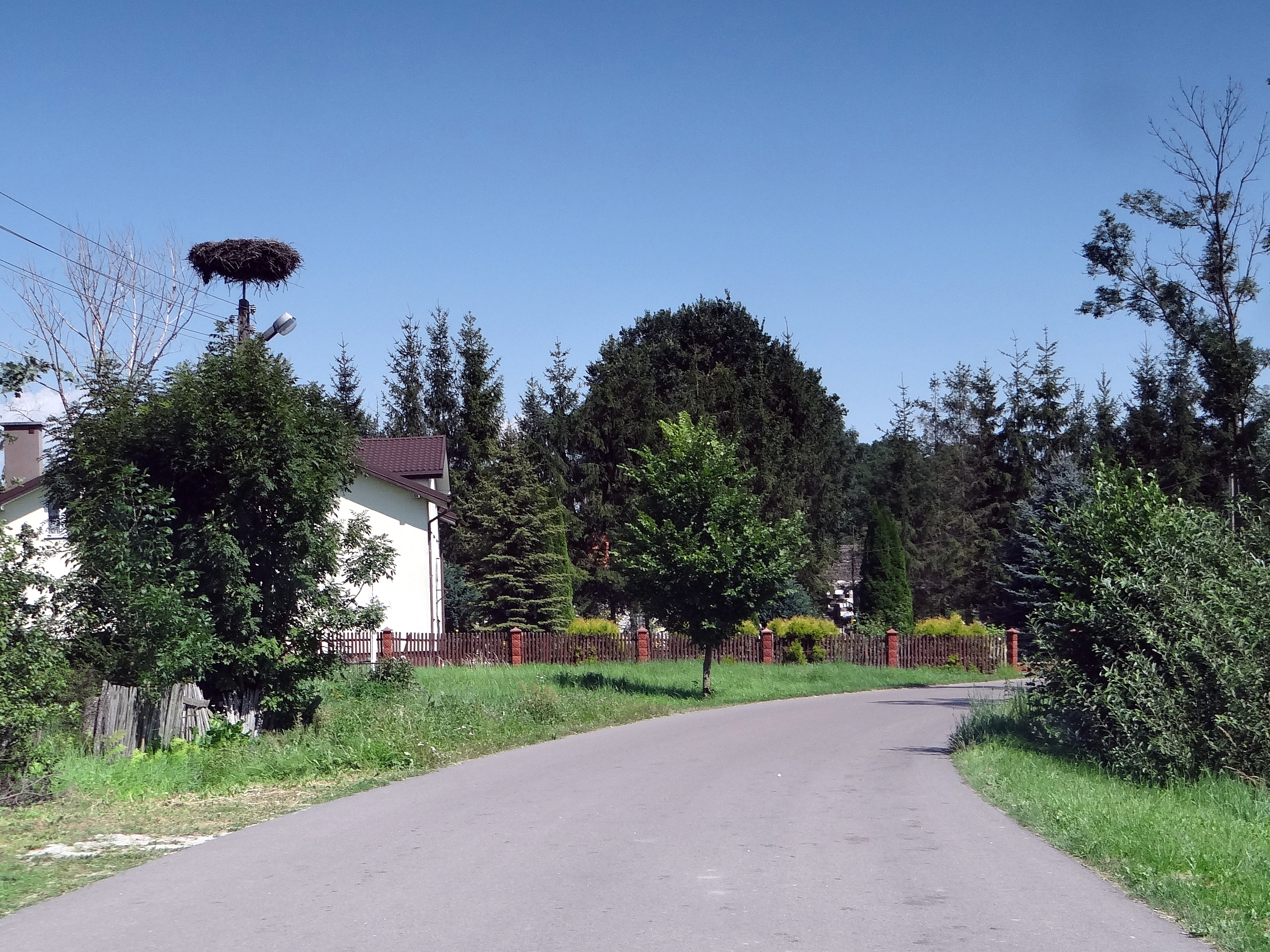

- Location within Poland
- Coordinates: 50°17′N 23°0′E
- Country: Poland
- Voivodeship: Podkarpackie Voivodeship
- County: Lubaczów
- Gmina: Stary Dzików
- Time zone: UTC+1 (CET)
  - Summer (DST): UTC+2 (CEST)
- Vehicle registration: RLU

Ułazów [uˈwazuf] is a village in the administrative district of Gmina Stary Dzików, within Lubaczów County, Subcarpathian Voivodeship, in south-eastern Poland.

Four Polish citizens were murdered by Nazi Germany in the village during World War II.
