= Gmina Stary Dzików =

Gmina Stary Dzików Stary Dzików Commune
- Gmina
- Coat of arms
- Interactive map of Gmina Stary Dzików
- Coordinates (Stary Dzików): 50°15′N 22°56′E
- Country: Poland
- Voivodeship: Subcarpathian
- County: Lubaczów
- Seat: Stary Dzików

Area
  - Total: 155.77 km^{2} (60.14 sq mi)

Population (2013)
  - Total: 4,352
  - Density: 27.94/km^{2} (72.36/sq mi)
- Website: http://www.stary-dzikow.dt.pl/

Gmina Stary Dzików is a rural administrative district in Lubaczów County, Subcarpathian Voivodeship, in south-eastern Poland. Its seat is the village of Stary Dzików, which lies approximately 17 kilometres (11 mi) north-west of Lubaczów and 71 km (44 mi) east of the regional capital Rzeszów.

This administrative district covers an area of 155.77 square kilometres (60.1 sq mi), and as of 2006 its total population is 4,588 (4,352 in 2013).

== Villages ==
Gmina Stary Dzików contains the villages: Cewków, Koziejówka, Moszczanica, Nowy Dzików, Stary Dzików, Ułazów and Witki.

== Neighbouring gminas ==
Gmina Stary Dzików borders on the districts of Adamówka, Obsza, Tarnogród and Wiązownica.
