= Witki, Podkarpackie Voivodeship =

Witki
- Village
- Location within Poland
- Coordinates: 50°16′N 22°55′E
- Country: Poland
- Voivodeship: Subcarpathian
- County: Lubaczów
- Gmina: Stary Dzików

Witki [ˈvʲitkʲi] is a village in the administrative district of Gmina Stary Dzików, within Lubaczów County, Subcarpathian Voivodeship, in south-eastern Poland.
