= Koziejówka =

- Village
- Location within Poland
- Coordinates: 50°15′N 22°57′E
- Country: Poland
- Voivodeship: Subcarpathian
- County: Lubaczów
- Gmina: Stary Dzików

Koziejówka [kɔʑɛˈjufka] is a village in the administrative district of Gmina Stary Dzików, within Lubaczów County, Subcarpathian Voivodeship, in south-eastern Poland.
