= Magas-hegy =

Mountain in Hungary

Coordinates: 48.402102868164114°N 21.632172351059705°E

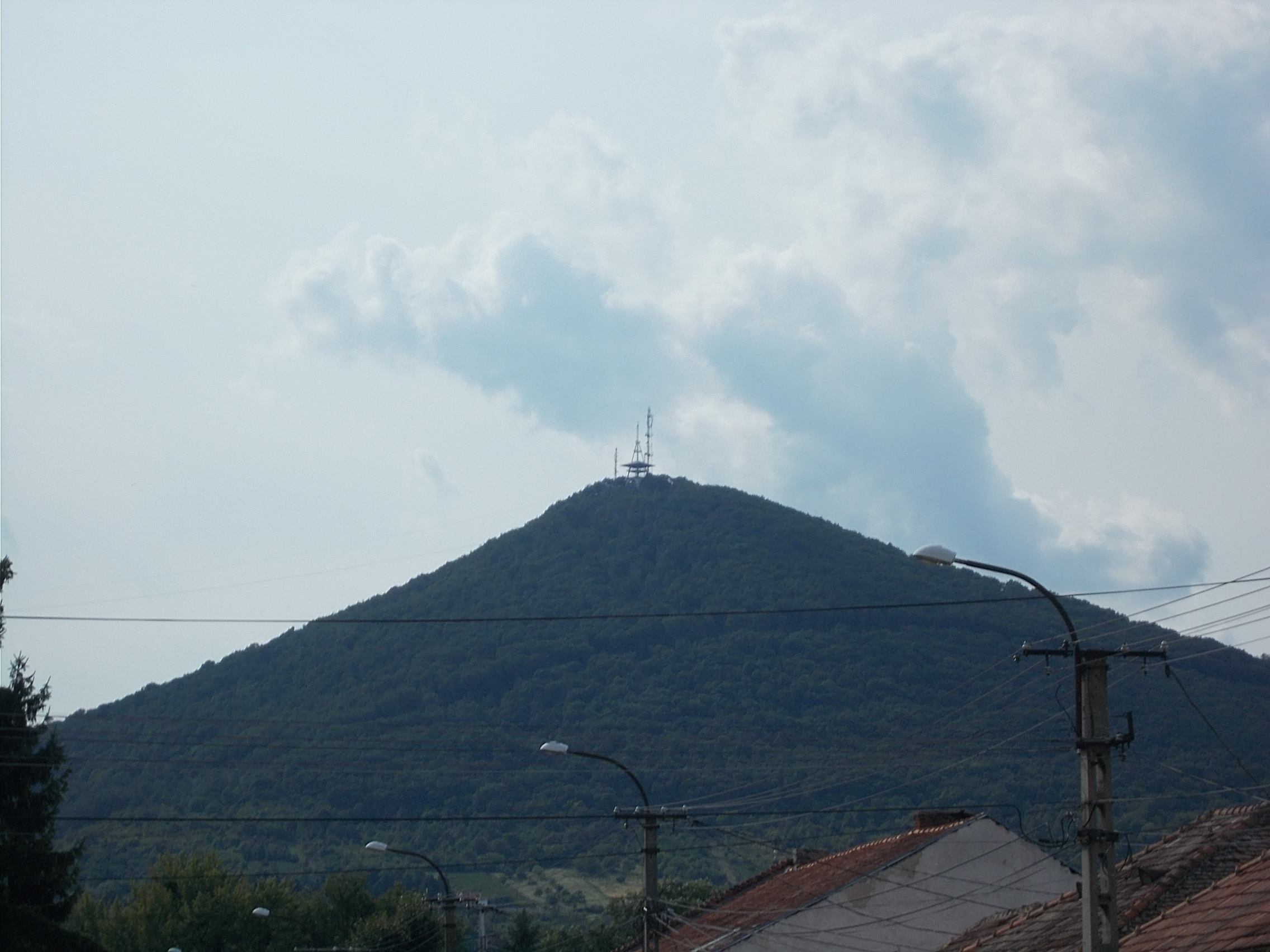
The mountain

Magas-hegy is a 1,268 ft / 514 m mountain peak near Sátoraljaújhely, Borsod-Abaúj-Zemplén, Hungary. Based on peakery data, it ranks as the 219th highest mountain in Hungary. It is part of the Zemplén Mountains or Tokaj Mountains (Hungarian: Zempléni-hegység or Tokaji-hegység).

== Name ==
Magas-hegy means High Mountain in Hungarian

== Origin ==
The Zemplén Mountains are of volcanic origin; the soil's high quality favours viticulture.
