= Stary Dzików =

- Village
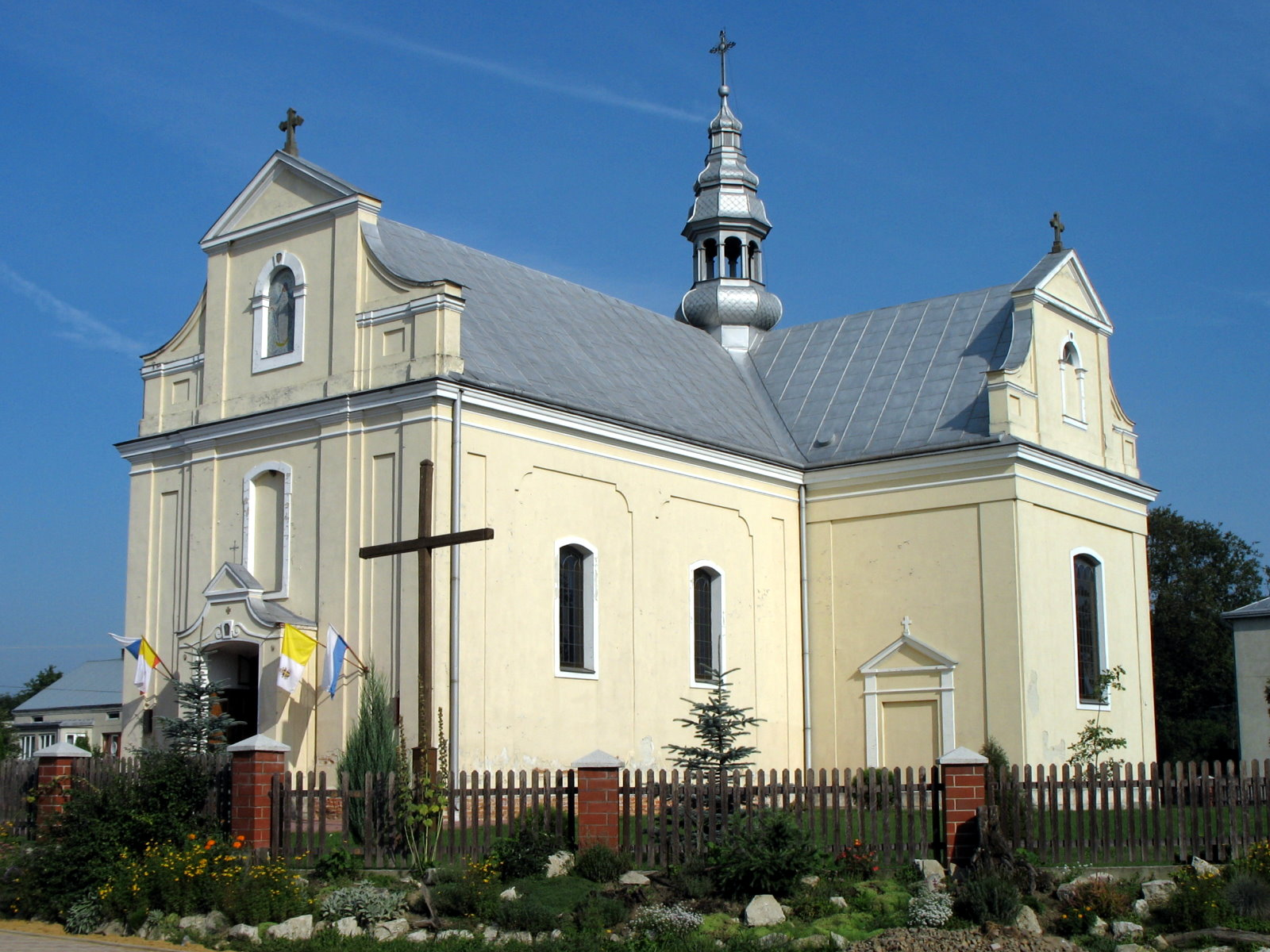
- Catholic church in Stary Dzików

- Coat of arms

- Location within Poland
- Coordinates: 50°15′N 22°56′E
- Country: Poland
- Voivodeship: Subcarpathian
- County: Lubaczów
- Gmina: Stary Dzików
- Population: 1,320

Stary Dzików pronounced [ˈstarɨ ˈd͡ʑikuf] is a village in Lubaczów County, Subcarpathian Voivodeship, in south-eastern Poland. It is the seat of the gmina (Polish administrative district) called Gmina Stary Dzików.

The name of the village is derived from the wild boar (Polish: dzik) once roaming the local forest. There was a small hunting castle in Dzików in the Middle Ages, rebuilt as a defensive manor, and eventually turned into brewery in the 19th century.

== History ==
The first hint about Stary Dzików appears in the chronicle of Jan Długosz dated back to 1469, when the village belonged to the Ramsz family. At the beginning of the 16th century the settlement was purchased by provincial governor Stanisław Odrowąż of the Odrowąż coat of arms. At the end of the 16th century the village was for a short time the property of the crown, then bought again in short succession by the following noble families: Sieniawscy, Czartoryscy, Zamoyscy and Tarnowscy. Stary Dzików lost its town privileges during the Partitions of Poland in 1772. Before World War II, Stary Dzików was a populous village with about 2,500 inhabitants where one could witness the harmonious life of Polish, Jewish and Ukrainian communities.

=== World War II ===
Following the invasion of Poland in 1939 the Nazi Germans destroyed the synagogue. In June 1940 a forced labour camp was set up outside the town for the Jewish slave labour, with around 1,000 prisoners transported from the camp in Cieszanów. It was part of a system of camps of the Lublin Reservation affiliated with the Bełżec prior to the Final Solution. In November 1940 the camp in Dzików was liquidated, and all its inmates marched away on foot to an unknown destination. In total only 100 local Jews survived the Holocaust. The Ukrainian community was displaced in 1947. Their former presence in this region is marked by the Uniate Church dated back to 1904.

In 2007 Andrzej Wajda, most famous Polish film director and producer, used this village in the production of his latest movie Katyń about the 1940 Katyn massacre.
