= Tongchuan Church =

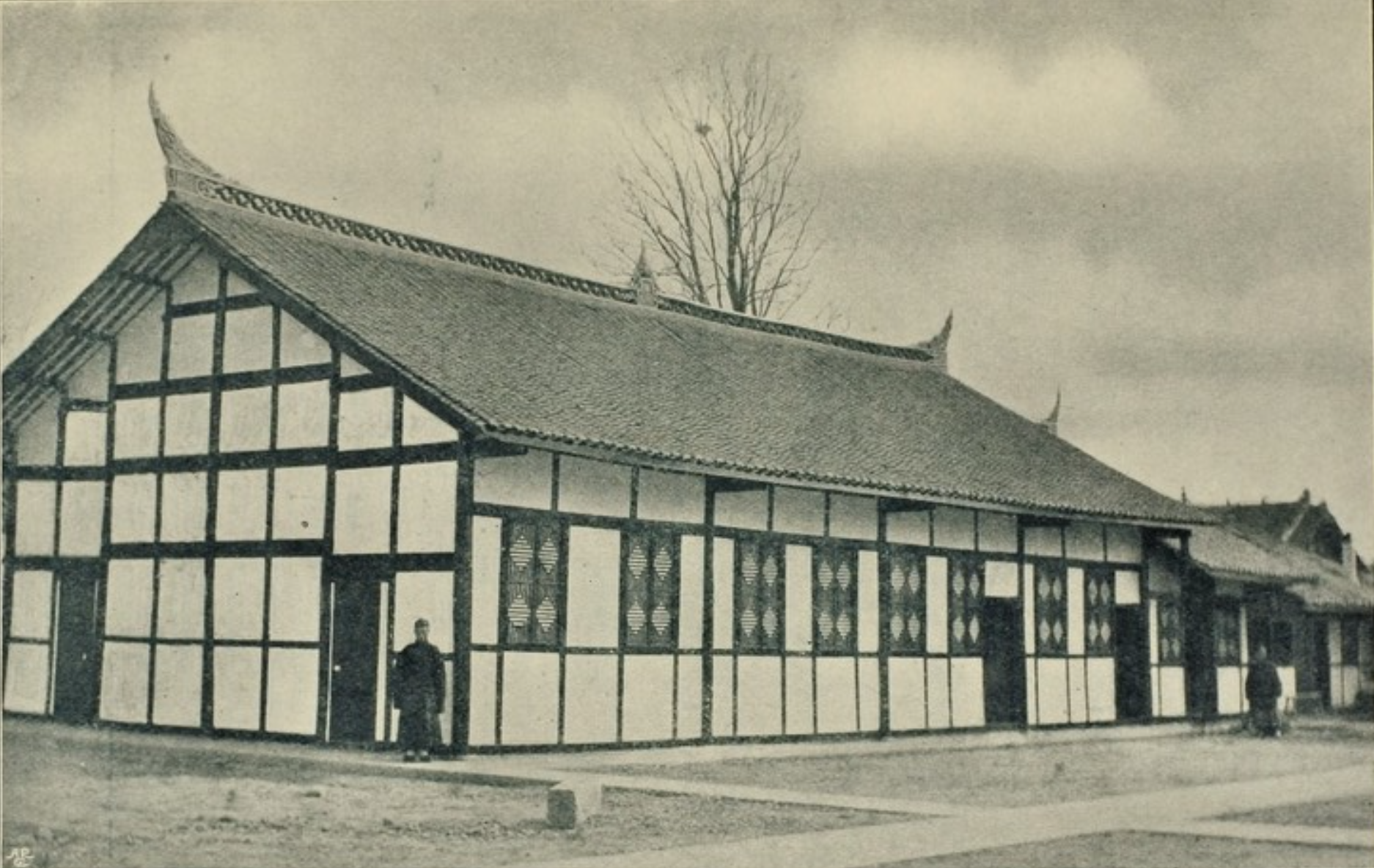
- Tongchuan Meeting House around 1905
- Location: Santai, Mianyang, Sichuan
- Country: China
- Denomination: Three-Self Church (Protestant)
- Previous denomination: Quaker

History
- Status: Church
- Founded: 1900
- Founder: Isaac Mason

Architecture
- Functional status: Active
- Style: Western Sichuanese residential style (original church building)

Administration
- Province: Szechwan Yearly Meeting (formerly)
- Diocese: Santai Monthly Meeting (formerly)

Tongchuan Church, formerly known as Tongchuan Meeting House, Santai Meeting House or Gospel Church, is a Protestant church building situated on Jiefang Lower Street (lit. 'Liberation Lower Street') in Santai, a county under the administration of the city of Mianyang, Sichuan. Founded in 1900 by the British Quaker mission, Friends' Foreign Mission Association, as their meeting house, the church has been subjected to the control of the state-sanctioned Chinese Three-Self Patriotic Church since 1954.

== History ==
Tongchuan Prefecture, as Santai County was known during the imperial era, was the first place visited by Robert John and Mary Jane Davidson, a missionary couple of the Friends' Foreign Mission Association (FFMA), after arriving in Sichuan in 1887. They stayed in the home of a local Muslim, while trying to rent premises to establish mission stations. Their mission efforts were hindered due to the opposition of the local magistrate. After two years of vain negotiations, they had no choice but to turn to Chongqing, the only place which seemed open to them.

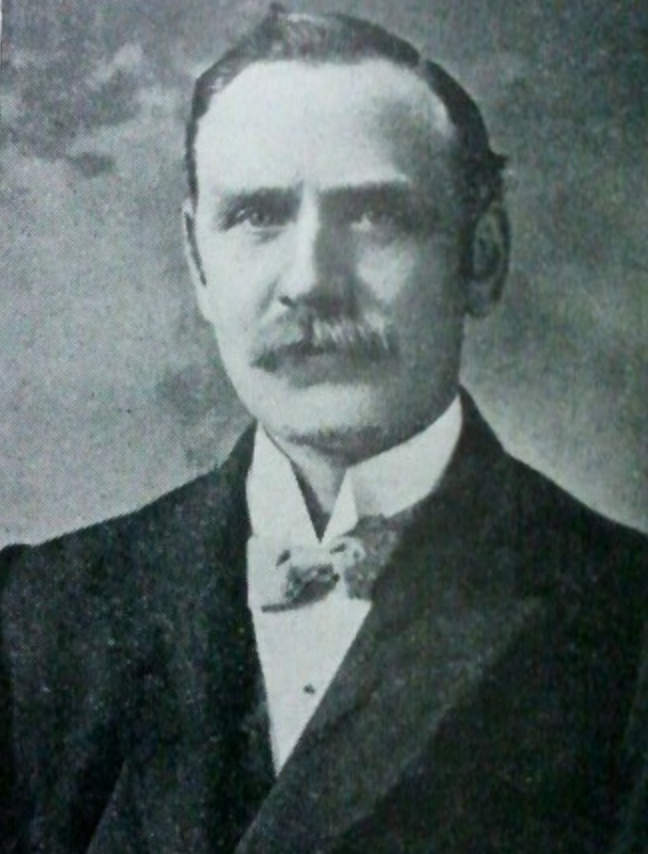
Isaac Mason

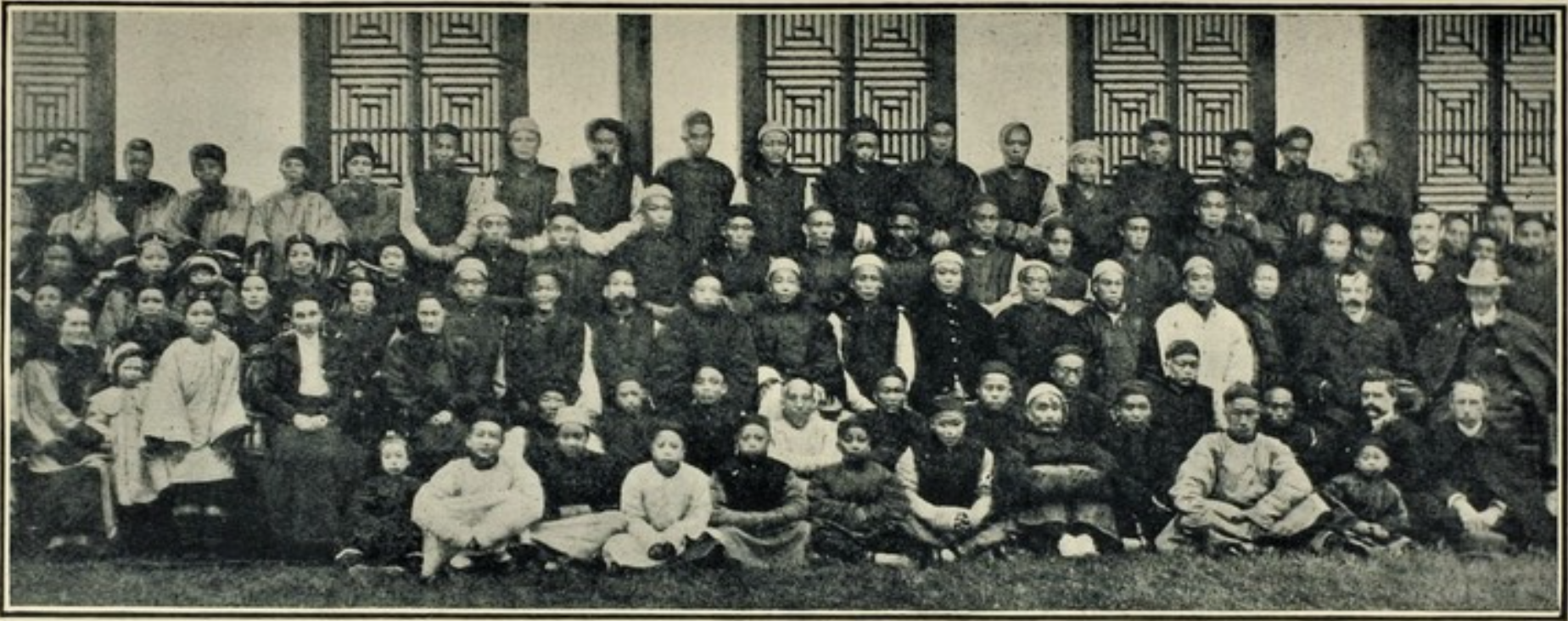
Missionaries and native Christians gathered outside Tongchuan Meeting House for the visit of the deputation, 1904.

In 1899, Isaac Mason and his mission group were appointed by FFMA to live at Tongchuan, where they took up residence early in 1900. They opened a dispensary and held meetings for worship in a very dilapidated chapel made out of unused small rooms. Mason founded the first Friends meeting house at High Well Street (now Back North Street), which was later transferred along with the mission station to a place called Xiaowan (lit. 'Little Creek'). They subsequently opened a girls' school and a hospital, in addition to an already established boys' school. In 1921, the church was expanded to include four wooden buildings, covering an area of 210 square metres, nine attached houses totaling more than 300 square metres, and a small wooden building designed in Western style.

Tongchuan Monthly Meeting became the largest mission branch of FFMA's Northern District, governing four towns under the administration of Tongchuan Prefecture (Lingxing, Jingfu, Anju, Qiulin), and member churches of nine counties in other administrative regions (including Yanting, Yulongzhen, Shehongxian and its seat Taihochen). According to the statistics provided in 1944 by Republican-era Tongchuan Government, there were 278 local converts consisting of 195 men and 83 women. By the time of the communists' takeover of Sichuan in December 1949, only the three congregations in Tongchuan city centre, Lingxing and Jingfu were still active.

In 1954, the communist authorities established the Three-Self Patriotic Church and forced all Christian denominations to sever ties with overseas churches. Tongchuan Meeting House has since been subjected to the control of the Three-Self Church. In 1989, the original church building was completely demolished in the name of "demolition of dilapidated buildings", and was replaced by a new building. It is now used as the headquarters of Santai Three-Self Patriotic Association.

== See also ==
- Monthly meeting
- Gospel Church, Mianyang
- Trinity Church, Langzhong — a former Anglican church in Sichuan with similar architectural style
