= Longshu, Sichuan =

Longshu 龙树镇
- Town
- Longshuzhen
- Location in Sichuan
- Coordinates: 31°23′44″N 105°10′25″E
- Country: People's Republic of China
- Province: Sichuan
- Autonomous prefecture: Mianyang
- County: Santai County

Area
  - Total: 80.88 km^{2} (31.23 sq mi)

Population (2010)
  - Total: 16,791
  - Density: 207.6/km^{2} (537.7/sq mi)
- Time zone: UTC+8 (China Standard)

Longshu (Mandarin: 永新镇) is a town in Santai County, Mianyang, Sichuan, China. In 2010, Longshu had a total population of 16,791: 8,818 males and 7,973 females: 2,317 aged under 14, 12,506 aged between 15 and 65 and 1,968 aged over 65.
