= MNU =

MNU may refer to:

- Manitoba Nurses' Union, a Canadian trade union
- Matariki Network of Universities, an international group
- MidAmerica Nazarene University, Olathe, Kansas, US
- Maldives National University, Maldives
- Mokpo National University, Muan/Mokpo, South Jeolla province, South Korea
- Mianyang Normal University, Mianyang, Sichuan, China
- Maqsut Narikbayev University, Astana, Kazakhstan.
- Multi-National United, in the film District 9
- Myanmar Noble University, Yangon Myanmar
- Movimento Negro Unificado Contra a Discriminação Racial, Brazil; see Black movement in Brazil
