= Yongxin, Sichuan =

Yongxin 永新镇
- Town
- Yongxinzhen
- Location in Sichuan
- Coordinates: 31°9′50″N 105°6′16″E
- Country: People's Republic of China
- Province: Sichuan
- Autonomous prefecture: Mianyang
- County: Santai County

Area
  - Total: 26.53 km^{2} (10.24 sq mi)

Population (2010)
  - Total: 8,082
  - Density: 304.6/km^{2} (789.0/sq mi)
- Time zone: UTC+8 (China Standard)

Yongxin (Mandarin: 永新镇) is a township in Santai County, Mianyang, Sichuan, China. In 2010, Yongxin had a total population of 8,082: 4,207 males and 3,875 females: 1,078 aged under 14, 6,001 aged between 15 and 65 and 1,003 aged over 65.
