= Our Lady of Lourdes Church, Mianyang =

- Our Lady—Chapel of Lourdes
- 露德聖母堂
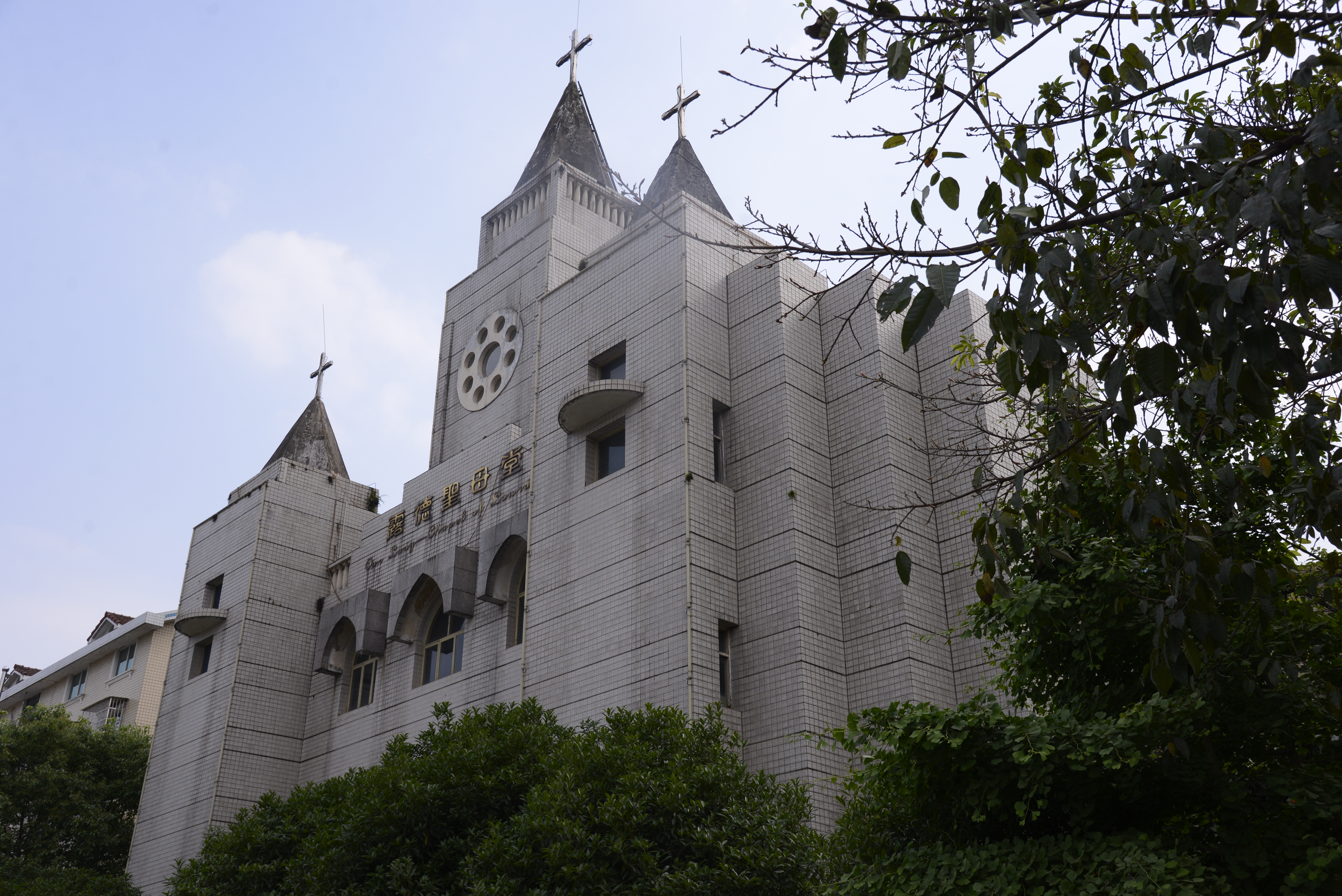
- Our Lady of Lourdes Church in 2021
- Location: 71 Yuquan Road, Fucheng District, Mianyang, Sichuan
- Country: China
- Denomination: Catholic Church

History
- Status: Church
- Dedication: Our Lady of Lourdes

Architecture
- Functional status: Active
- Style: Gothic Revival

Administration
- Archdiocese: Chongqing
- Diocese: Chengdu

Clergy
- Bishop: Joseph Tang Yuange
- Priest: Zhong Cheng

Our Lady of Lourdes Church, (Note: traditional Chinese: 露德聖母堂; simplified Chinese: 露德圣母堂; pinyin: Lùdé shèngmǔ táng; Wade–Giles: Lu^{4}-tê^{2} shêng^{4}-mu^{3} tʽang^{2}; Sichuanese romanization: Lu^{4} Te^{5} Shen^{4} Mu^{3} Tʽang^{2}.) also known as Our Lady—Chapel of Lourdes, is a Roman Catholic church in the Diocese of Chengdu, situated on Yuquan Road, at the foot of West Hill Park in Fucheng District, Mianyang, Sichuan. The church is subjected to the control of the state-sanctioned Chinese Catholic Patriotic Association. Mary Zhang Yimei, a resident nun, is in charge of the church's daily affairs.

== Architecture ==
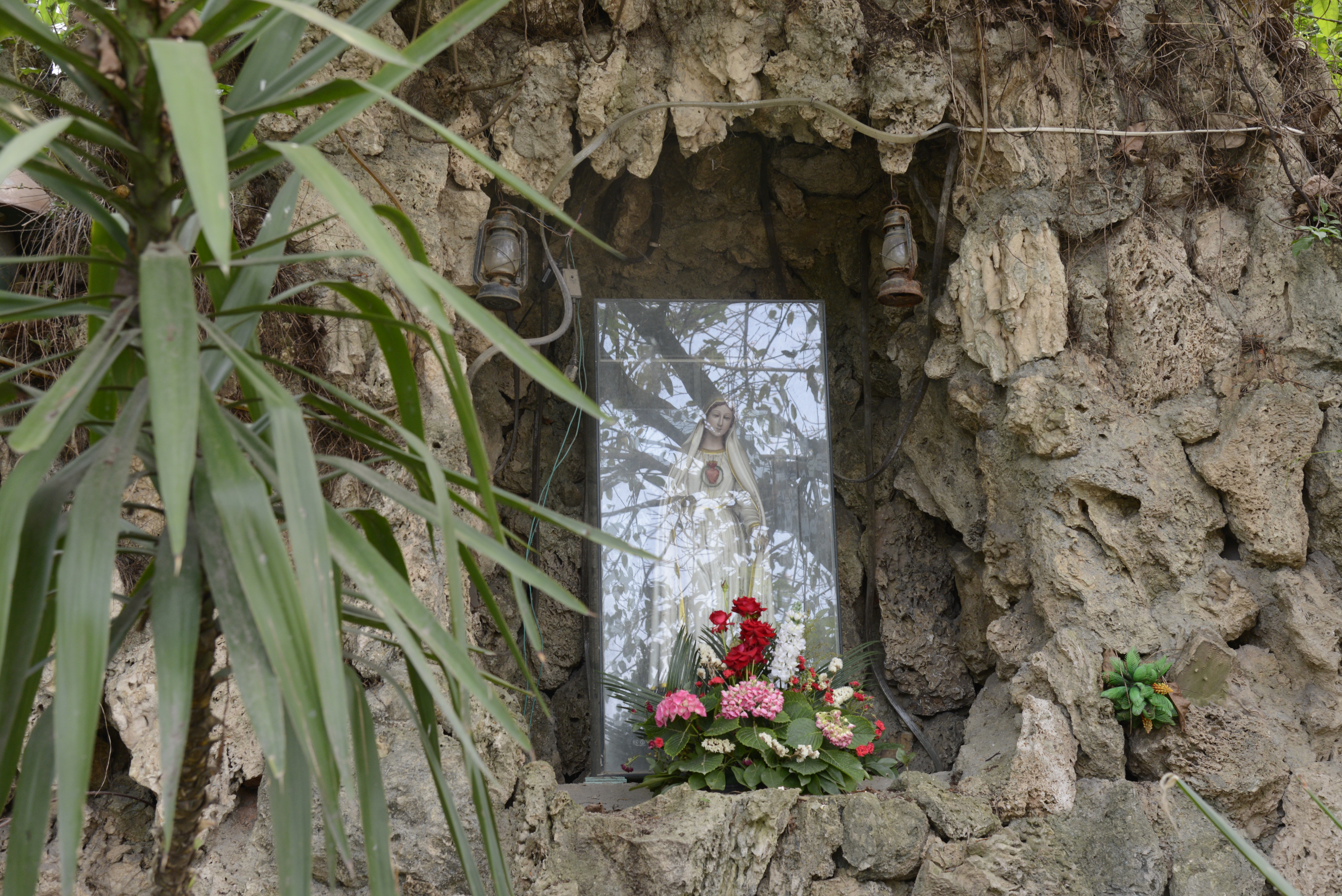
Immaculate Heart statue in the grotto

Our Lady of Lourdes is a humble church built in white brick of the neo-Gothic style. Inside, the plan is that of a nave and two aisles on either side. The interior walls are simply whitewashed. Behind the altar is a white statue of the Virgin Mary with orange halo placed in a niche. A Lourdes grotto is located in the church courtyard, but strangely, the statue within the cave depicts the Immaculate Heart of Mary as described by Lúcia of Fátima.

== Church activities ==
A pedagogical training course is held in the church every summer, targeting children and teenagers aged 7–18, as well as some missionary training courses being occasionally conducted by the church. Teachers from Hong Kong have also been invited to give lectures on marriage, family and children's education.

During the 2008 Sichuan earthquake, a transportation of grain and oil was carried out by the parish priest Zhong Cheng, along with Mary Zhang Yimei, another resident nun Zhan Dengju, and several Catholic volunteers. With three cars and a lorry, they passed through military and police checkpoints and reached the blocked area in Beichuan County to help the victims.

== Gallery ==
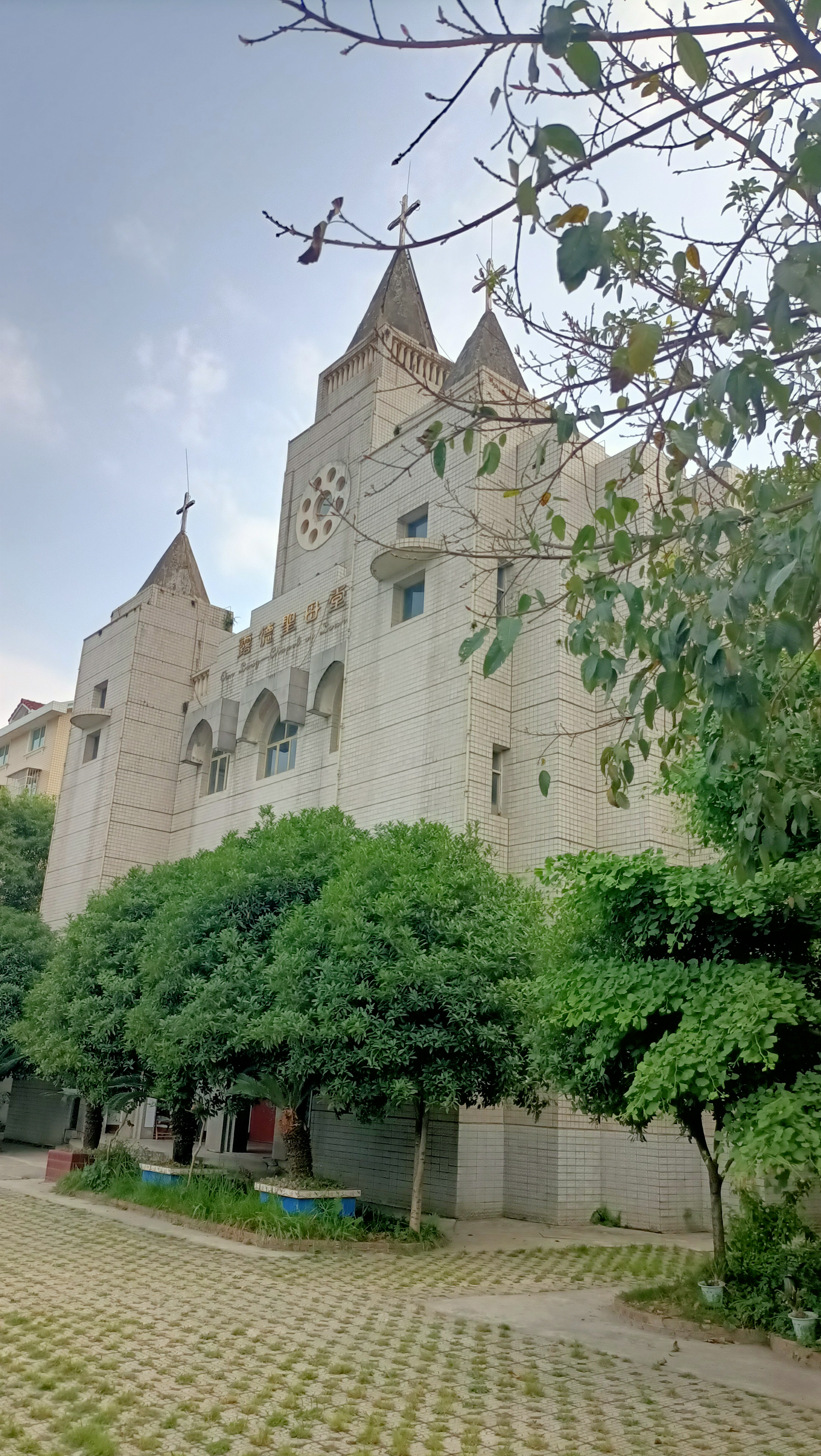
Exterior of the church

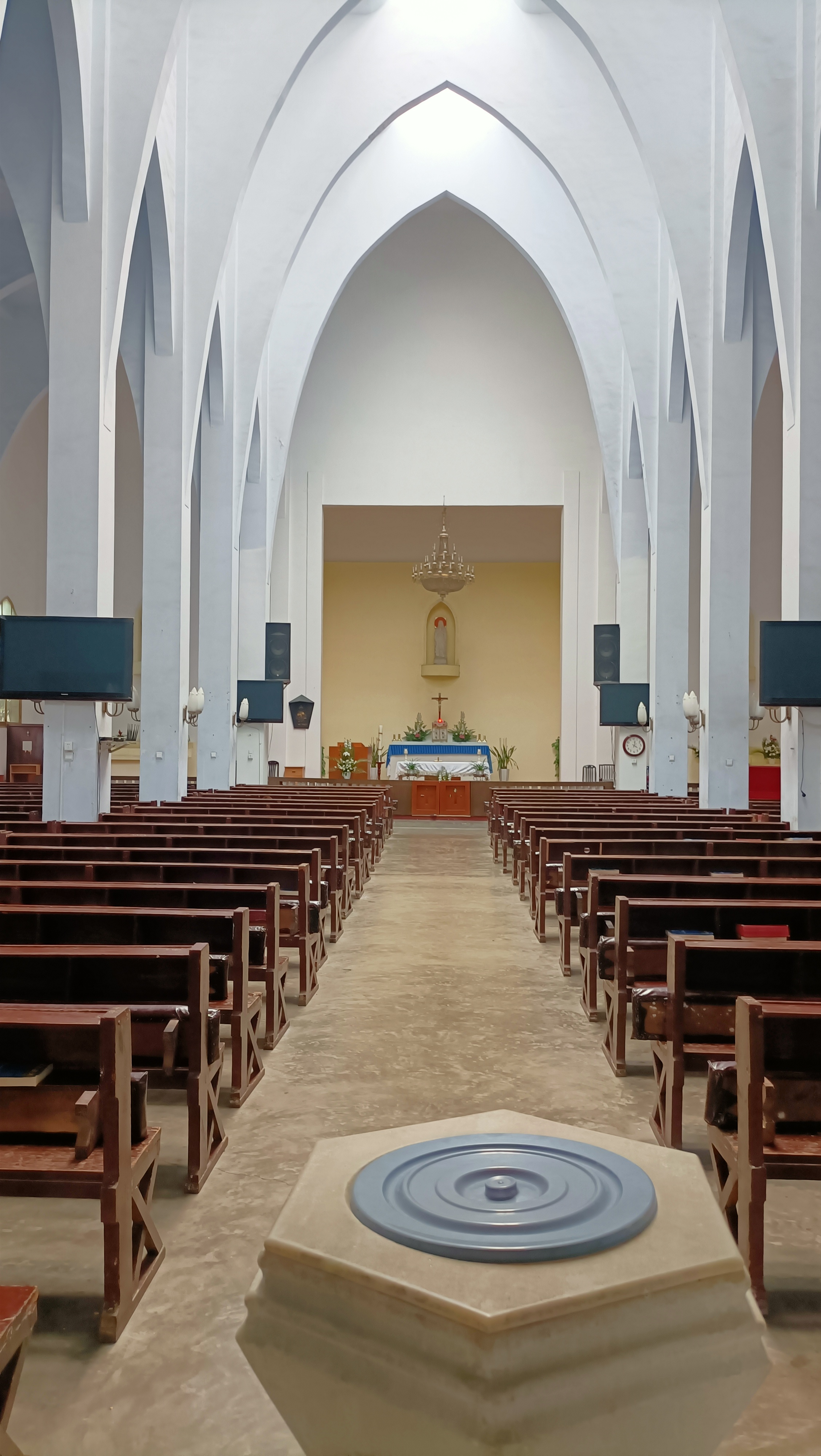
Interior of the church

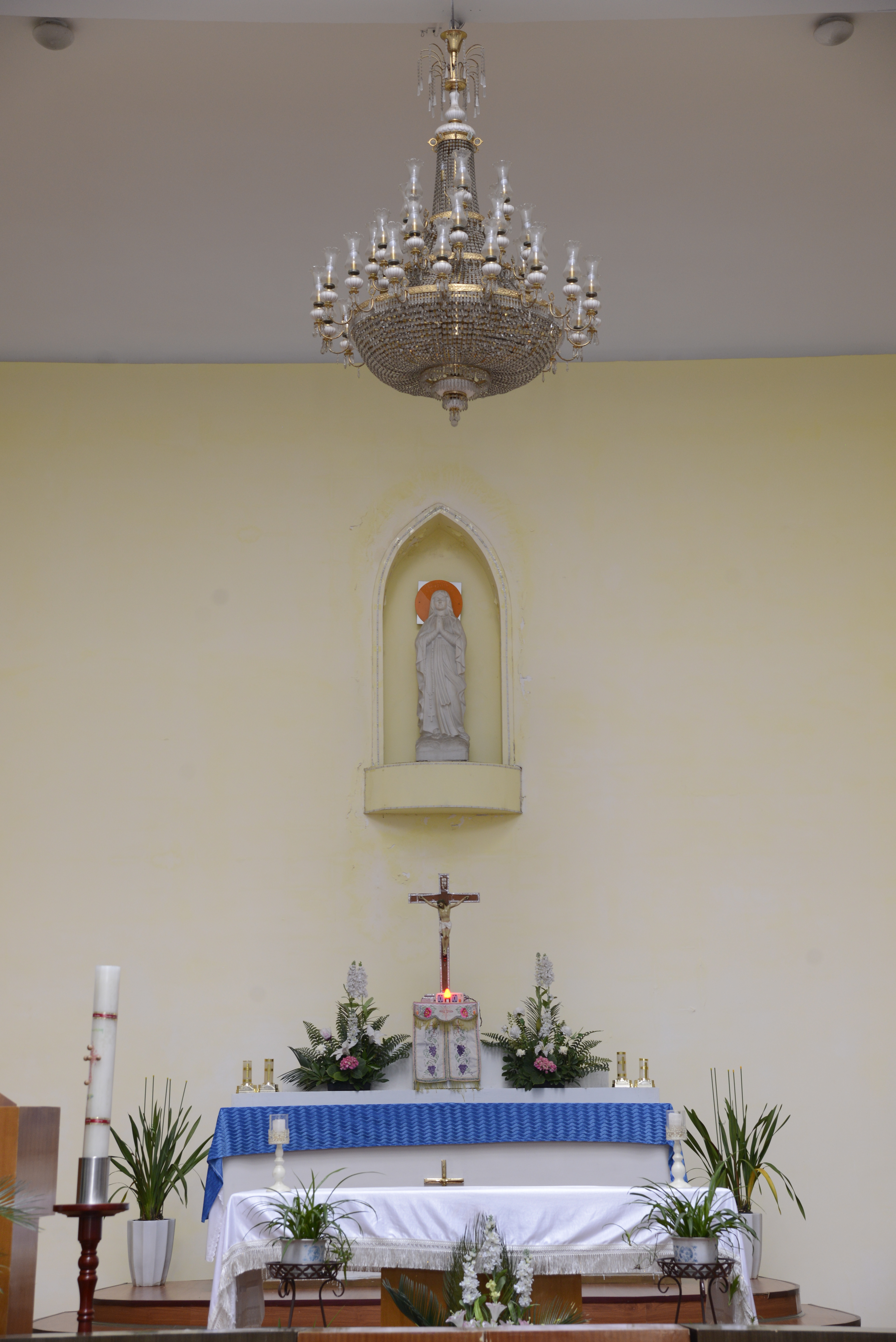
Main altar

== See also ==
- Lucy Yi Zhenmei
- Gospel Church, Mianyang
- Catholic Church in Mianyang
- Catholic Church in Sichuan
- Immaculate Conception Cathedral, Chengdu
