= Gospel Church, Mianyang =

- Fucheng Christian Church
- 福音堂
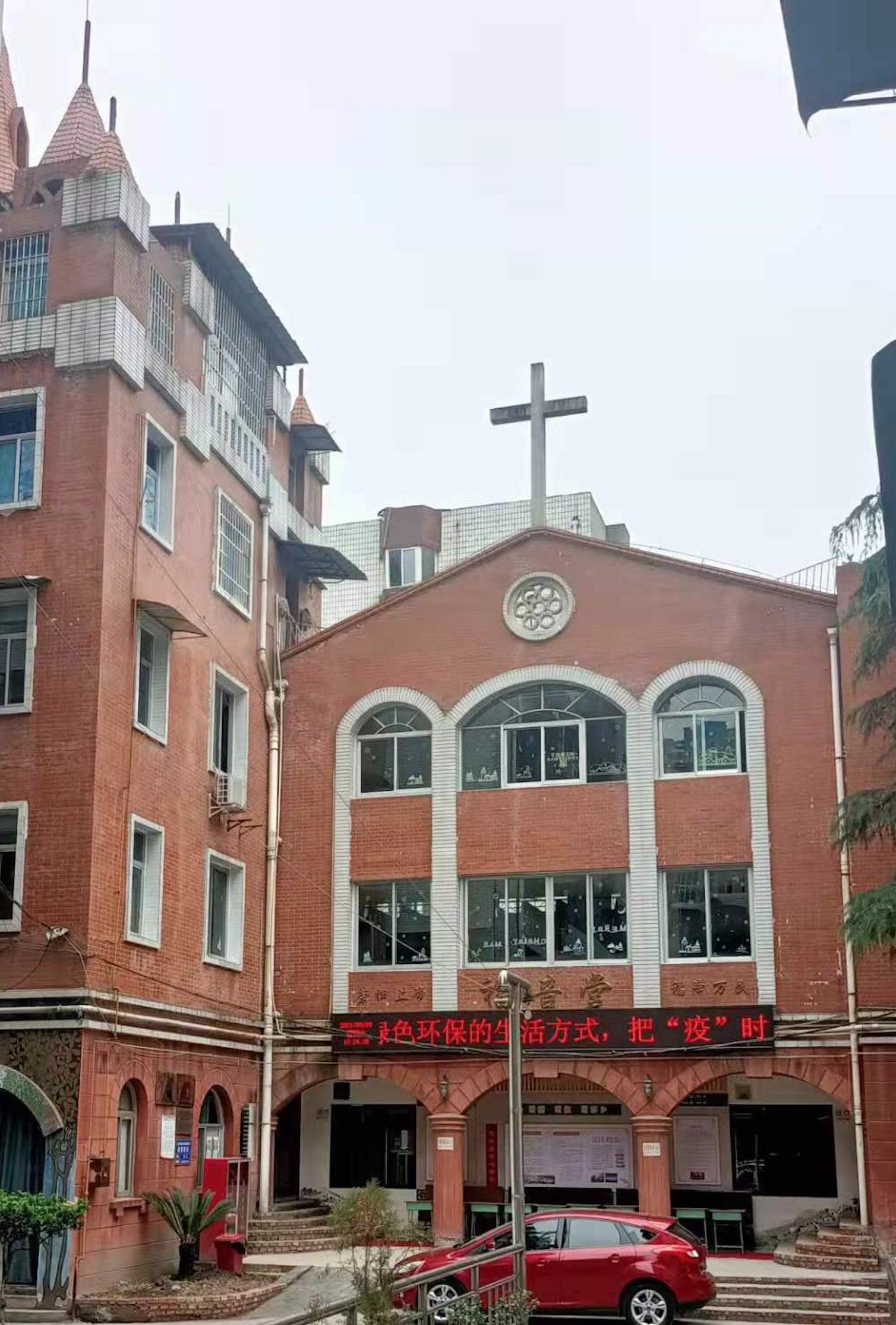
- Gospel Church after being rebuilt
- Gospel Church, Mianyang
- 31.4554°N 104.7558°E
- Location: 46 Jiefang Street, Fucheng District, Mianyang, Sichuan
- Country: China
- Denomination: Three-Self Church (Protestant)
- Previous denomination: Church of England (1885–1912); Anglican Church in China (1912–1950s)
- Churchmanship: Low church evangelical

History
- Status: Church
- Founded: 1885 or 1895
- Founder(s): Alfred Arthur Phillips and Gertrude Emma Wells of the Church Missionary Society

Architecture
- Functional status: Active
- Style: Gothic Revival prev. siheyuan

Administration
- Province: China (formerly)
- Diocese: Szechwan (formerly); West Szechwan (formerly; since 1936)

Gospel Church (Note: Chinese: 福音堂; pinyin: Fúyīn táng; Wade–Giles: Fu^{2}-yin^{1} tʽang^{2}; Sichuanese romanization: Fu^{5} In^{1} Tʽang^{2}, commonly referred to as Fucheng Christian Church (traditional Chinese: 涪城區基督教堂; simplified Chinese: 涪城区基督教堂; pinyin: Fúchéngqū Jīdū jiàotáng; Sichuanese romanization: Fu^{2}-chʽen^{2}-chʽü^{1} Chi^{1}-tu^{5}-chiao^{4}-tʽang^{2}; lit. 'Fucheng District Christian Church'.) is a Protestant church building situated on Jiefang Street (lit. 'Liberation Street') in Fucheng District, Mianyang. It was first built in 1895, or 1885 according to Annals of Religion in Mianyang, by Alfred Arthur Phillips and Gertrude Emma Wells, missionaries of the Church Missionary Society (CMS) under the jurisdiction of the Church of England. The church has been subjected to the control of the communist-established 'Three-Self Patriotic Church' since 1954. It was rebuilt in 1995.

== History ==
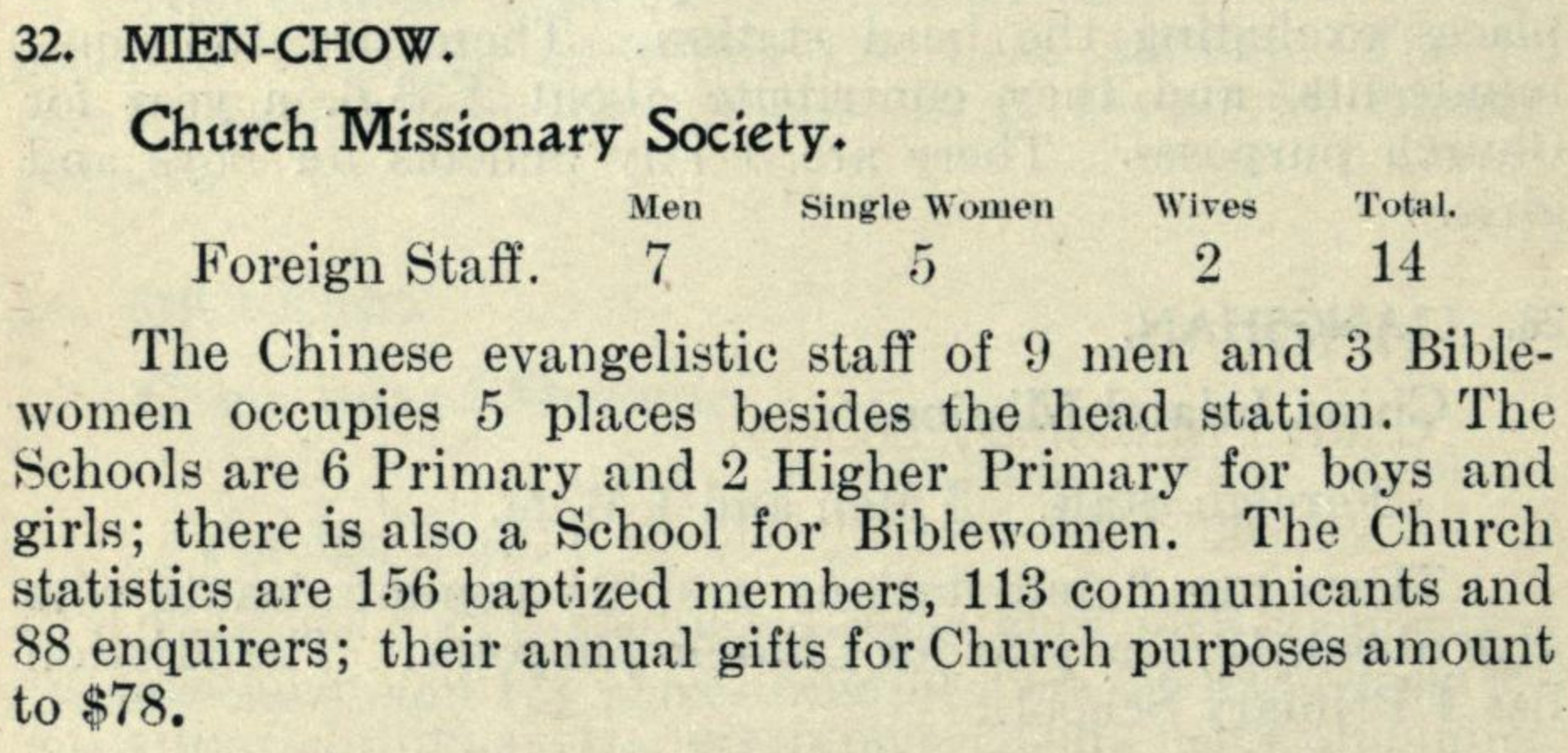
Survey of the Church Missionary Society's mission work in Mienchow, published in 1913.

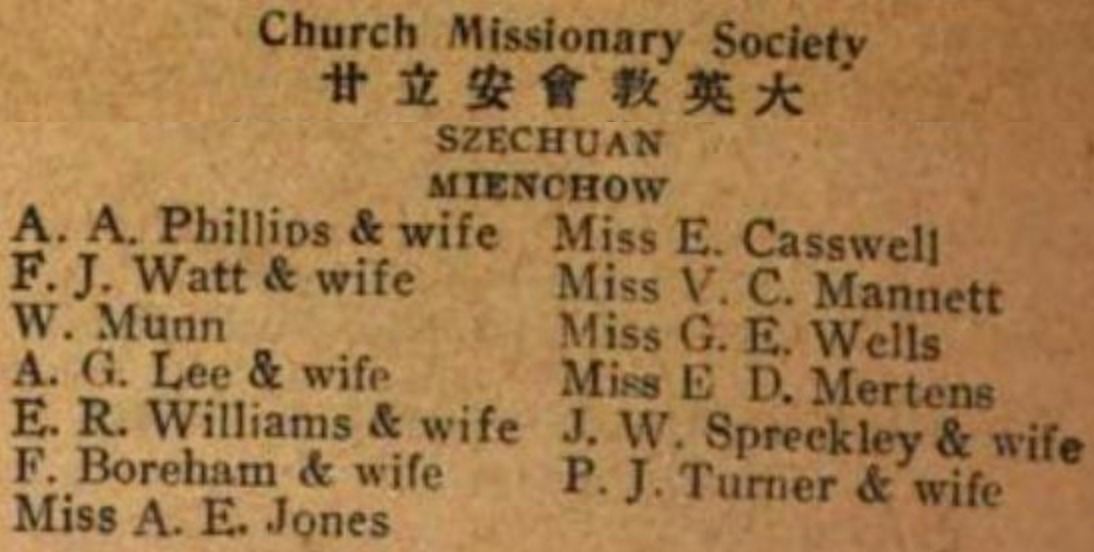
List of CMS missionaries stationed in Mienchow, 1920.

According to Annals of Religion in Mianyang (formerly known as Mien Yong or Mienchow), the presence of Anglicanism in Mianyang can be traced back to 1885, when a mission house church was built by Alfred Arthur Phillips and Gertrude Emma Wells of the Church Missionary Society (CMS) on Tongsheng Street. In the late 1880s, two women representing the Church of England Zenana Missionary Society were working there. This was followed by the entry of a CMS mission team into that city in 1894, led by James Heywood Horsburgh, who expanded the church; and Mianyang subsequently became the headquarters of the CMS Mission. During the Republican Era (1912–1949), Tongsheng Street (通聖街, lit. 'All Saints' Street'; now known as 'Liberation Street' for political propaganda), as its name suggests, that brought together three religious buildings, namely, a Confucian temple, a Wenchang Taoist temple, which no longer exist, and the Anglican Gospel Church.

The original church is built in the traditional local courtyard house style, covering an area of 2800 square metres. The missionaries also established the Yoh Teh School in nearby Huangjiaxiang (Huang Family's Alley), Hua Ying Middle School in Nanshan subdistrict (present-day Nanshan High School, established by William Munn), as well as Yung Shêng Sweet Factory, a dairy factory, a nursery, et cetera. In 1954, the communist government established the 'self-governance, self-support, and self-propagation' Three-Self Patriotic Church, various Christian denominations in China would eventually sever their ties with overseas Churches. Under this policy, the then pastor Tiexia Zheng led his congregation to establish the 'Mianyang Christian Three-Self Reform Movement Committee', and since then the church embarked on the 'three-self road'.

After the 1990s, as the number of converts has increased, Gospel Church was rebuilt on the occasion of its centenary. The new church is a two-storey building covering an area of 1200 square metres, with Roman-style arches, Byzantine-inspired windows, and neo-Gothic steeples, symbolizing masts. In 2009, on the occasion of the anniversary of the 2008 Sichuan earthquake, Gospel Church hosted several contemporary worship services led by Joyful Noise Xpress, a music ministry and mission organization founded by Anthony Chan, a Hong Kong American Christian musician. Participants included the founder and Hong Kong musician Peter Kam. As of 2016, the congregation consists of three pastors, twenty-six volunteer preachers, and about eight thousand baptised Christians, as well as thirty meeting points.

== See also ==
- Anglicanism in Mianyang
- Anglicanism in Sichuan
- Frederick Boreham
- Gospel Church, Jiangyou
- Gospel Church, Santai
- Our Lady of Lourdes Church, Mianyang
- Category:Former Anglican church buildings in Sichuan
- St John's Church, Chengdu – former cathedral of West Szechwan
