= Jingfu, Sichuan =

Jingfu 景福镇
- Town
- Location in Sichuan
- Coordinates: 30°51′17″N 105°10′28″E
- Country: People's Republic of China
- Province: Sichuan
- Prefecture-level city: Mianyang
- County: Santai County
- Time zone: UTC+8 (China Standard)

Jingfu (Chinese: 景福; pinyin: Jǐngfú) is a town under the administration of Santai County in Sichuan, China. As of 2020, it administers the following three residential neighborhoods and 15 villages:

Neighborhoods

- Jingfu Community
- Fangya Community (方垭社区)
- Shuangle Community (双乐社区)

Villages

- Baishawan Village (白沙湾村)
- Yingpanshan Village (营盘山村)
- Makouyan Village (马口堰村)
- Putisi Village (菩提寺村)
- Jinlong Village (金龙村)
- Tiangongshan Village (天公山村)
- Huaishan Village (槐山村)
- Zhuangyuanbei Village (状元碑村)
- Zhonghelou Village (钟鹤楼村)
- Hexie Village (和谐村)
- Xiangyang Village (向阳村)
- Taihe Village (太和村)
- Xinghua Village (兴华村)
- Wuquanshan Village (五泉山村)
- Songguanmiao Village (宋观庙村)
