= Youxian =

Youxian may refer to:

- Youxian District, in Mianyang, Sichuan, China
- You County, in Hunan, China
- Yóuxiān, a class of immortals called Xian in Chinese philosophy.
