= Gospel Church, Jiangyou =

- 福音堂
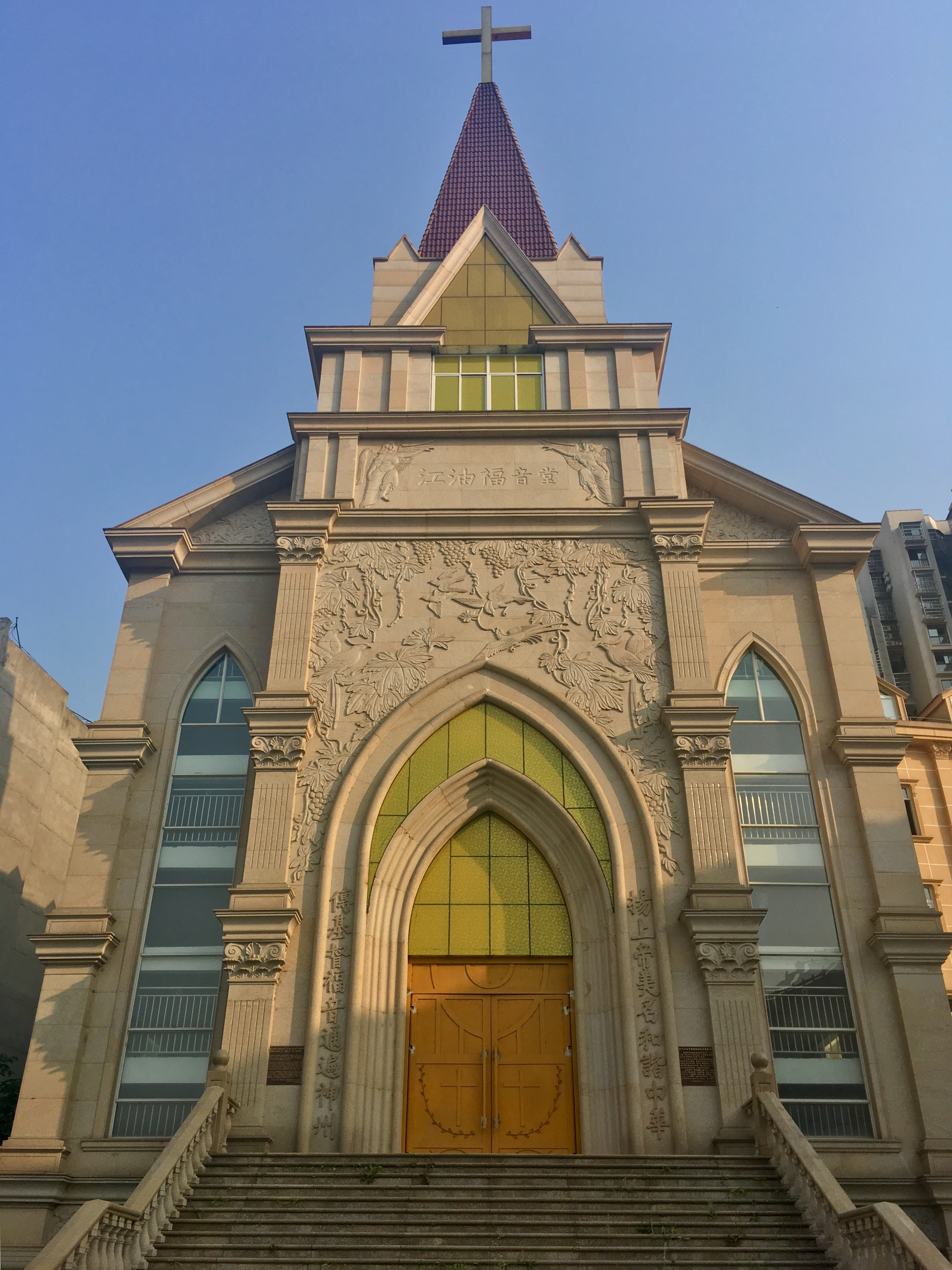
- Gospel Church after being rebuilt
- Location: Jiangyou, Mianyang, Sichuan
- Country: China
- Denomination: Three-Self Church (Protestant)
- Previous denomination: Anglican
- Churchmanship: Low church evangelical

History
- Status: Church
- Founded: 1894
- Founder: Church Missionary Society

Architecture
- Functional status: Active
- Style: Gothic Revival
- Groundbreaking: 1890s (old church building); 2008 (new church building)

Administration
- Province: China (formerly)
- Diocese: Szechwan (formerly); West Szechwan (formerly; since 1936)

Clergy
- Pastor: Xianke Li

Gospel Church (Note: Chinese: 福音堂; pinyin: Fúyīn táng; Wade–Giles: Fu^{2}-yin^{1} tʽang^{2}; Sichuanese romanization: Fu^{5} In^{1} Tʽang^{2}.) is a Protestant church in the county-level city of Jiangyou, under the administration of the city of Mianyang, Sichuan Province. Founded in 1894, it was formerly an Anglican church in the West Szechwan Diocese of the Church in China. It has been subjected to the control of the state-sanctioned Three-Self Patriotic Church since 1954.

== History ==
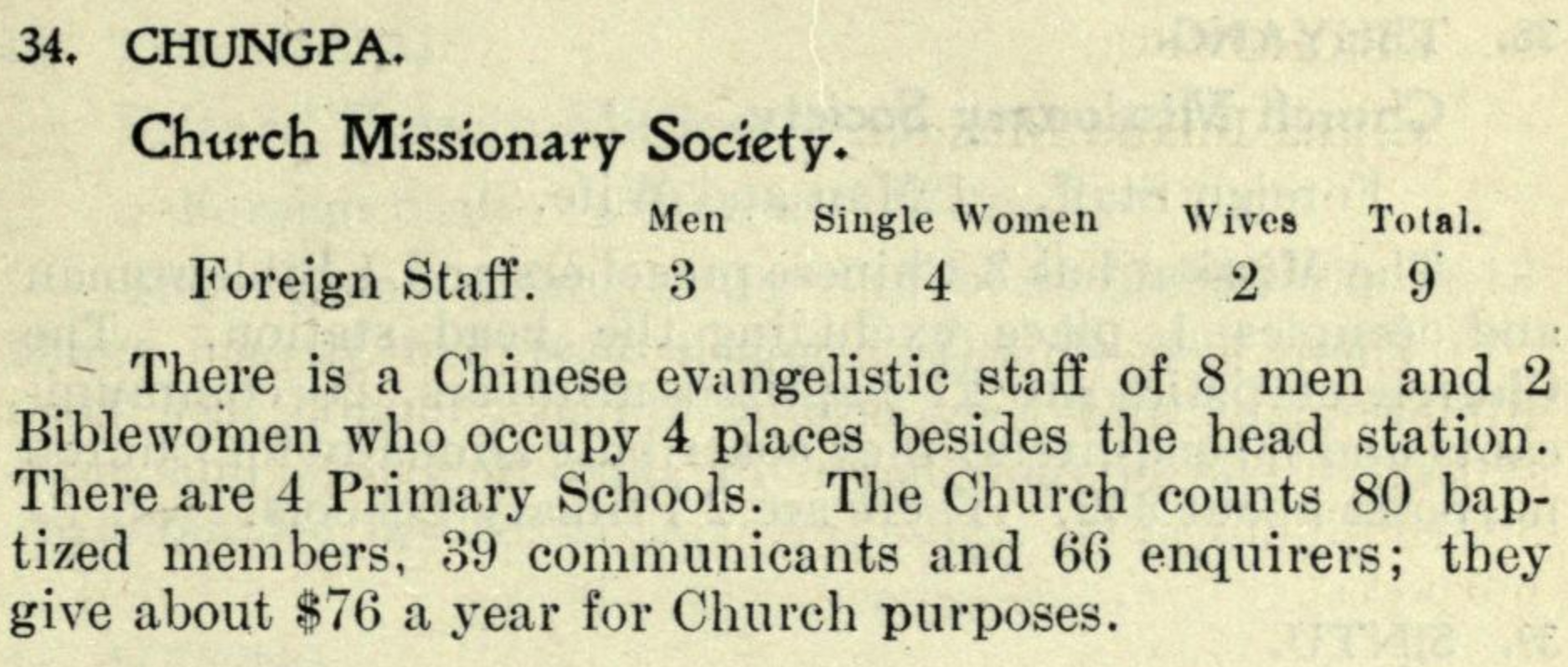
Survey of the Church Missionary Society's mission work in Chungpa, published in 1913.

In 1894, a group of Church Missionary Society (CMS) missionaries led by the Rev. James Heywood Horsburgh introduced Anglicanism into a small town known as Zhongba (formerly romanised as Chungpa) under the administration of Jiangyou. They established churches and mission stations across western Sichuan, Chungpa Church was the first church building in the province founded by the CMS.

After the communist takeover of China in 1949, Christian Churches in China were forced to sever their ties with respective overseas Churches, which has thus led to the merging of Gospel Church into the communist-established Three-Self Patriotic Church.

During the 2008 Sichuan earthquake, the church was damaged beyond repair. A new Gospel Church was built at the junction of Fujiang Road and Qingxin Alley, completed in an entirely neo-Gothic style.

== See also ==
- Anglicanism in Mianyang
- Anglicanism in Sichuan
- Gospel Church, Mianyang
- Category:Former Anglican church buildings in Sichuan
- St John's Church, Chengdu – former cathedral of West Szechwan
