= Myanmar Noble University =

Private university in Yangon, Myanmar

Coordinates: 16°47′26.3″N 96°09′47.7″E

- MNU
- Established: 2011
- Accreditation: Pearson Education
- Academic affiliations: University of East London
- Principal: Alexey A. Naumov
- Location: No (33/A), Thanthumar Road, Padonmar Street, (24)ward, Thuwanna, Yangon, Thingangyun Township, Yangon, Myanmar
- Website: myanmarnoblecollege.com.mm/home/

Myanmar Noble University (MNU) is a private university in Yangon, Myanmar, located in Thingangyun Township's Thuwanna ward. Established in 2011, MNU is accredited with Pearson Education in partnership with the University of East London in the United Kingdom.
