= Youxian, Mianyang =

Youxian 游仙区
- District
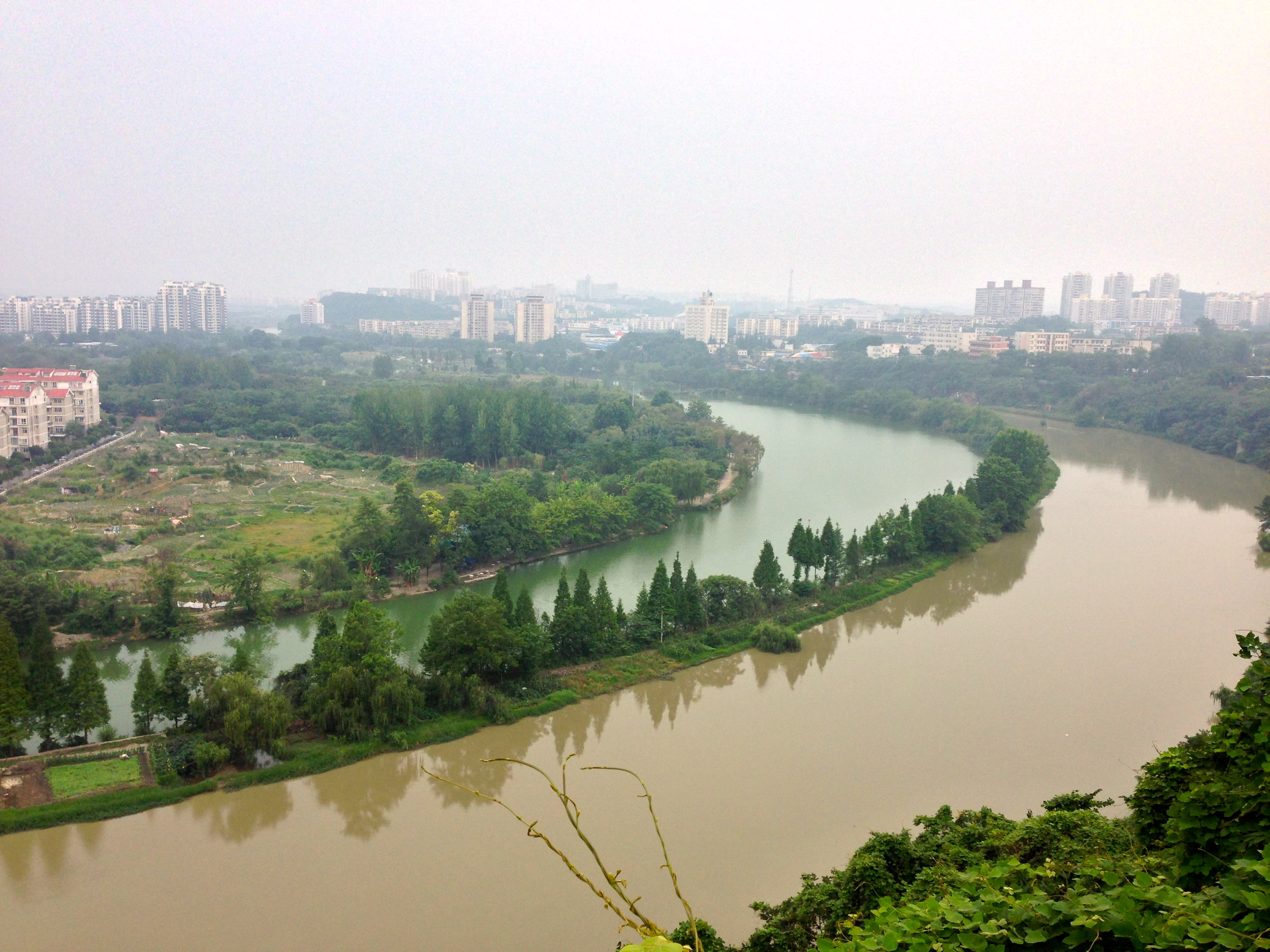

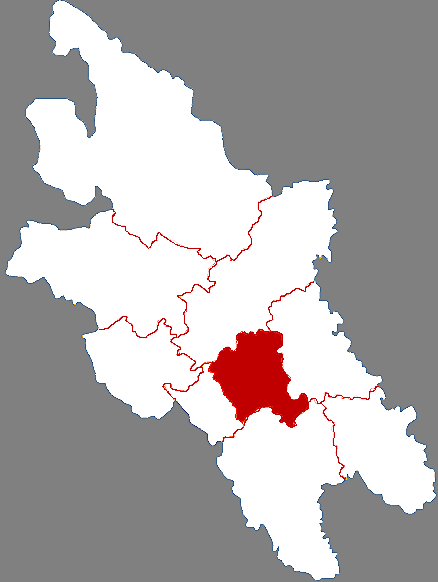
- Youxian in Mianyang

- Mianyang in Sichuan
- Country: China
- Province: Sichuan
- Prefecture-level city: Mianyang

Area
  - Total: 973 km^{2} (376 sq mi)

Population (2020)
  - Total: 561,379
  - Density: 577/km^{2} (1,490/sq mi)
- Time zone: UTC+8 (China Standard)

Youxian District (simplified Chinese: 游仙区; traditional Chinese: 遊仙區; pinyin: Yóuxiān Qū; Wade–Giles: You^{2}hsien^{1}ch'ü^{1}) is a district of the city of Mianyang, Sichuan Province, China.

== Administrative divisions ==
Youxian District comprises 4 subdistricts and 10 towns:

subdistricts

- Fujiang 涪江街道
- Fule 富乐街道
- Youxian 游仙街道
- Chunlei 春雷街道

towns

- Shima 石马镇
- Xinqiao 新桥镇
- Weicheng 魏城镇
- Chenkang 沉抗镇
- Zhongxing 忠兴镇
- Songya 松垭镇
- Xiaojian 小枧镇
- Xinyi 信义镇
- Xianhe 仙鹤镇
- Yanquan 盐泉镇
