= Mianyang Teachers' College =

Provincial public normal college in Mianyang, Sichuan, China

Mianyang Teachers' College (MTC; Chinese: 绵阳师范学院; formerly translated as Mianyang Normal University) is a provincial public normal college in Mianyang, Sichuan, China. It is affiliated with the Sichuan Provincial People's Government.
