= Yanting County =

Yanting County 盐亭县
- County
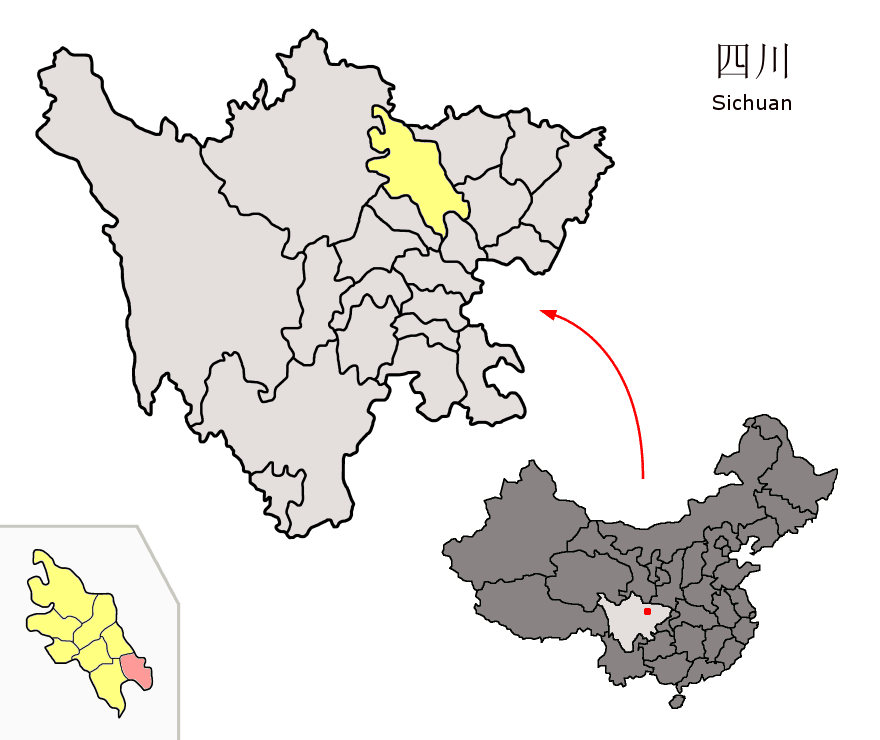
- Location of Yanting County (red) within Mianyang City (yellow) and Sichuan
- Coordinates: 31°12′29″N 105°23′20″E
- Country: China
- Province: Sichuan
- Prefecture-level city: Mianyang

Area
  - Total: 1,648 km^{2} (636 sq mi)

Population (2020 census)
  - Total: 370,739
  - Density: 225.0/km^{2} (582.7/sq mi)
- Time zone: UTC+8 (China Standard)

Yanting County (simplified Chinese: 盐亭县; traditional Chinese: 鹽亭縣; pinyin: Yántíng Xiàn) is a county under the administration of the prefecture-level city of Mianyang, in the northeast of Sichuan Province, China.

It has an area of 1645 square kilometers, and a population of 590,000 in 2002. The population dropped to around 370,000 in 2020.

== Administrative divisions ==
Yanting County comprises 1 subdistrict, 14 towns, 1 township and 1 ethnic township:

subdistrict

- Fengling Subdistrict 凤灵街道

towns

- Yunxi Town 云溪镇
- Yulong Town 玉龙镇
- Fuyi Town 富驿镇
- Jinkong Town 金孔镇
- Huangdian Town 黄甸镇
- Julong Town 巨龙镇
- Gaoqu Town 高渠镇
- Exi Town 鹅溪镇
- Qibo Town 岐伯镇
- Wentong Town 文通镇
- Yongtai Town 永泰镇
- Jiulong Town 九龙镇
- Xiling Town 西陵镇
- Leizu Town 嫘祖镇

township

- Lianhuahu Township 莲花湖乡

ethnic township

- Daxing Hui Ethnic Township 大兴回族乡

== Sports ==
The 8,000-capacity Yanting Stadium is located in Yanting County. It is used mostly for association football matches.

== Climate ==
Climate data for Yanting, elevation 421 m (1,381 ft), (1991–2020 normals, extremes 1981–present)
Month	Jan	Feb	Mar	Apr	May	Jun	Jul	Aug	Sep	Oct	Nov	Dec	Year
Record high °C (°F)	19.3 (66.7)	23.1 (73.6)	31.7 (89.1)	33.7 (92.7)	36.3 (97.3)	37.4 (99.3)	40.2 (104.4)	41.3 (106.3)	37.7 (99.9)	30.6 (87.1)	25.5 (77.9)	19.2 (66.6)	41.3 (106.3)
Mean daily maximum °C (°F)	9.7 (49.5)	12.6 (54.7)	17.6 (63.7)	23.5 (74.3)	27.3 (81.1)	29.6 (85.3)	31.7 (89.1)	31.6 (88.9)	26.5 (79.7)	21.2 (70.2)	16.4 (61.5)	10.8 (51.4)	21.5 (70.8)
Daily mean °C (°F)	5.8 (42.4)	8.4 (47.1)	12.7 (54.9)	17.9 (64.2)	21.9 (71.4)	24.7 (76.5)	26.9 (80.4)	26.5 (79.7)	22.2 (72.0)	17.3 (63.1)	12.4 (54.3)	7.2 (45.0)	17.0 (62.6)
Mean daily minimum °C (°F)	3.1 (37.6)	5.4 (41.7)	9.1 (48.4)	13.7 (56.7)	17.6 (63.7)	20.9 (69.6)	23.3 (73.9)	22.8 (73.0)	19.2 (66.6)	14.8 (58.6)	9.7 (49.5)	4.8 (40.6)	13.7 (56.7)
Record low °C (°F)	−3.4 (25.9)	−2.4 (27.7)	−2.0 (28.4)	3.5 (38.3)	7.8 (46.0)	13.6 (56.5)	16.3 (61.3)	16.1 (61.0)	11.9 (53.4)	4.0 (39.2)	0.2 (32.4)	−4.8 (23.4)	−4.8 (23.4)
Average precipitation mm (inches)	10.3 (0.41)	11.5 (0.45)	25.1 (0.99)	48.0 (1.89)	81.6 (3.21)	126.8 (4.99)	190.0 (7.48)	157.4 (6.20)	132.5 (5.22)	50.7 (2.00)	17.9 (0.70)	7.9 (0.31)	859.7 (33.85)
Average precipitation days (≥ 0.1 mm)	7.2	6.3	9.1	10.4	11.7	13.4	13.0	11.7	13.0	13.0	6.8	5.5	121.1
Average snowy days	1.7	0.7	0.1	0	0	0	0	0	0	0	0.1	0.4	3
Average relative humidity (%)	80	76	73	71	69	76	79	78	81	82	81	80	77
Mean monthly sunshine hours	58.4	59.9	98.2	131.9	140.1	123.7	149.9	160.5	94.2	71.1	63.9	53.0	1,204.8
Percentage possible sunshine	18	19	26	34	33	29	35	39	26	20	20	17	26
Source: China Meteorological Administration all-time extreme temperature all-time January highall-time July high
