= Fucheng, Mianyang =

Fucheng 涪城区
- District
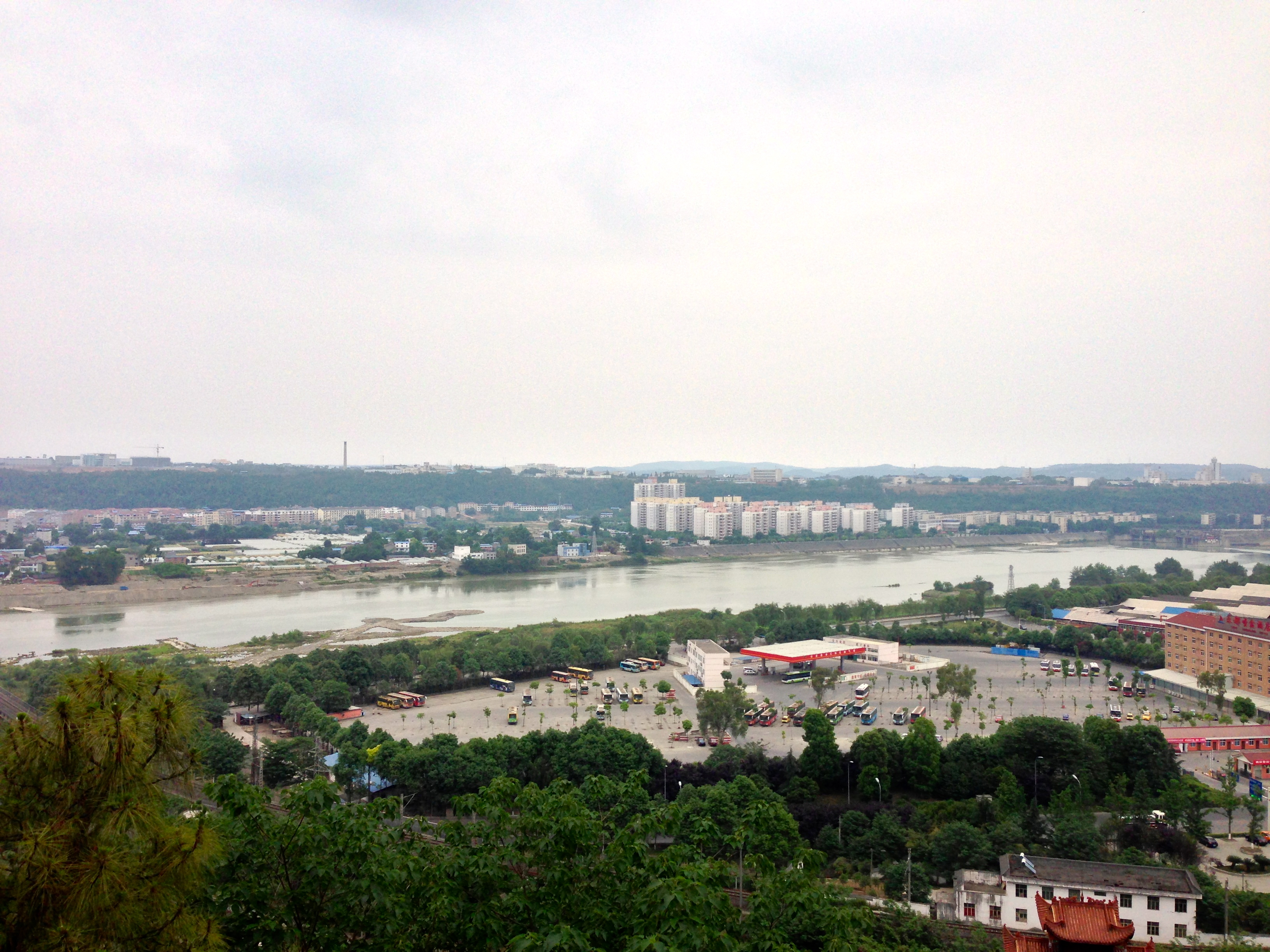

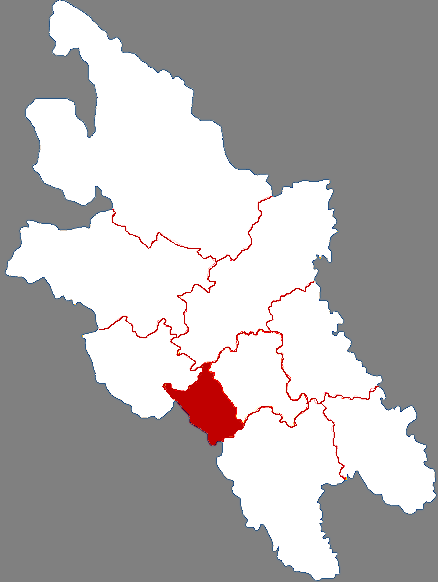
- Location of Fucheng in Mianyang

- Location in Sichuan
- Coordinates: 31°27′19″N 104°45′26″E
- Country: China
- Province: Sichuan
- Prefecture-level city: Mianyang
- District seat: Chengxiang Subdistrict

Area
  - Total: 597.7 km^{2} (230.8 sq mi)

Population (2020 census)
  - Total: 1,298,524
  - Density: 2,173/km^{2} (5,627/sq mi)
- Time zone: UTC+8 (China Standard)
- Website: www.myfc.gov.cn

Fucheng District (simplified Chinese: 涪城区; traditional Chinese: 涪城區; pinyin: Fúchéng Qū; Wade–Giles: Fu^{2}ch'êng^{2} Ch'ü^{1}) is a district of Mianyang, Sichuan, China.

== Administrative divisions ==
Fucheng District administers 8 subdistricts and 7 towns:

Subdistricts

- Chengxiang (城厢街道)
- Gongqu (工区街道)
- Puming (普明街道)
- Chuangyeyuan (创业园街道)
- Shitang (石塘街道)
- Chengjiao (城郊街道)
- Tangxun (塘汛街道)
- Shiqiao (石桥街道)

Towns

- Fenggu (丰谷镇)
- Qingyi (青义镇)
- Wujia (吴家镇)
- Yangjia (杨家镇)
- Xinzao (新皂镇)
- Yongxing (永兴镇)
