= Santai County =

Santai County 三台县 Tongchuan, Tungchwan
- County
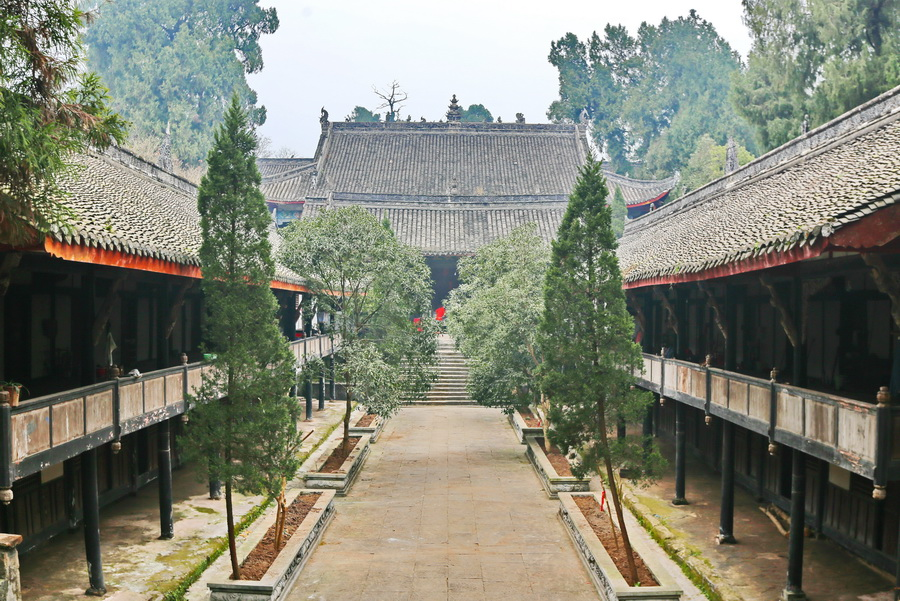

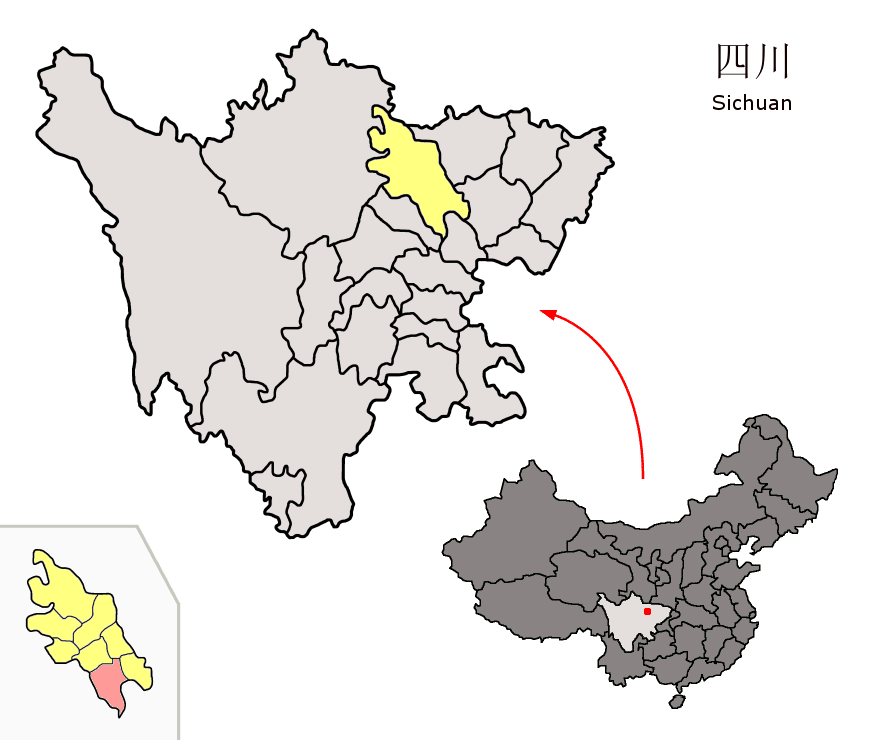
- Location of Santai County (red) within Mianyang City (yellow) and Sichuan
- Coordinates: 31°05′45″N 105°05′37″E
- Country: China
- Province: Sichuan
- Prefecture-level city: Mianyang

Area
  - Total: 2,660.58 km^{2} (1,027.26 sq mi)

Population (2020 census)
  - Total: 955,800
  - Density: 359.2/km^{2} (930.4/sq mi)
- Time zone: UTC+8 (China Standard)

Santai County (Chinese: 三台县; pinyin: Sāntái Xiàn; Wade–Giles: San^{1}-t῾ai^{2} Hsien^{4}; Sichuanese romanization: San^{1}-t῾ai^{2} Shien^{4}; formerly known as Tungchwanfu, Sichuanese romanization: Tongchuanfu) is a county under the administration of the prefecture-level city of Mianyang, in the northeast of Sichuan Province of China. It has an area of 2,660.58 km^{2} (1,027.26 sq mi). According to the 2020 census, its population stands at 955,800. At the end of 2024 and the beginning of 2025, the resident population is 944,000, the urbanization rate is 34.14%, the urban population is 322,300, and the registered population is 1,334,500.

== Administrative divisions ==
Santai County comprises 31 towns and 2 townships:

towns

- Tongchuan 潼川镇
- Tashan 塔山镇
- Longshu 龙树镇
- Shi'an 石安镇
- Fushun 富顺镇
- Sanyuan 三元镇
- Qiulin 秋林镇
- Xinde 新德镇
- Xinsheng 新生镇
- Luban 鲁班镇
- Jingfu 景福镇
- Zihe 紫河镇
- Guanqiao 观桥镇
- Qijiang 郪江镇
- Zhongxin 中新镇
- Gujing 古井镇
- Xiping 西平镇
- Badong 八洞镇
- Le'an 乐安镇
- Jianping 建平镇
- Zhongtai 中太镇
- Jinshi 金石镇
- Xinlu 新鲁镇
- Liuying 刘营镇
- Lingxing 灵兴镇
- Luxi 芦溪镇
- Lixin 立新镇
- Yongming 永明镇
- Jianzhong 建中镇
- Laoma 老马镇
- Beiba 北坝镇

townships

- Zhongxiao 忠孝乡
- Duanshi 断石乡

== Quaker mission ==
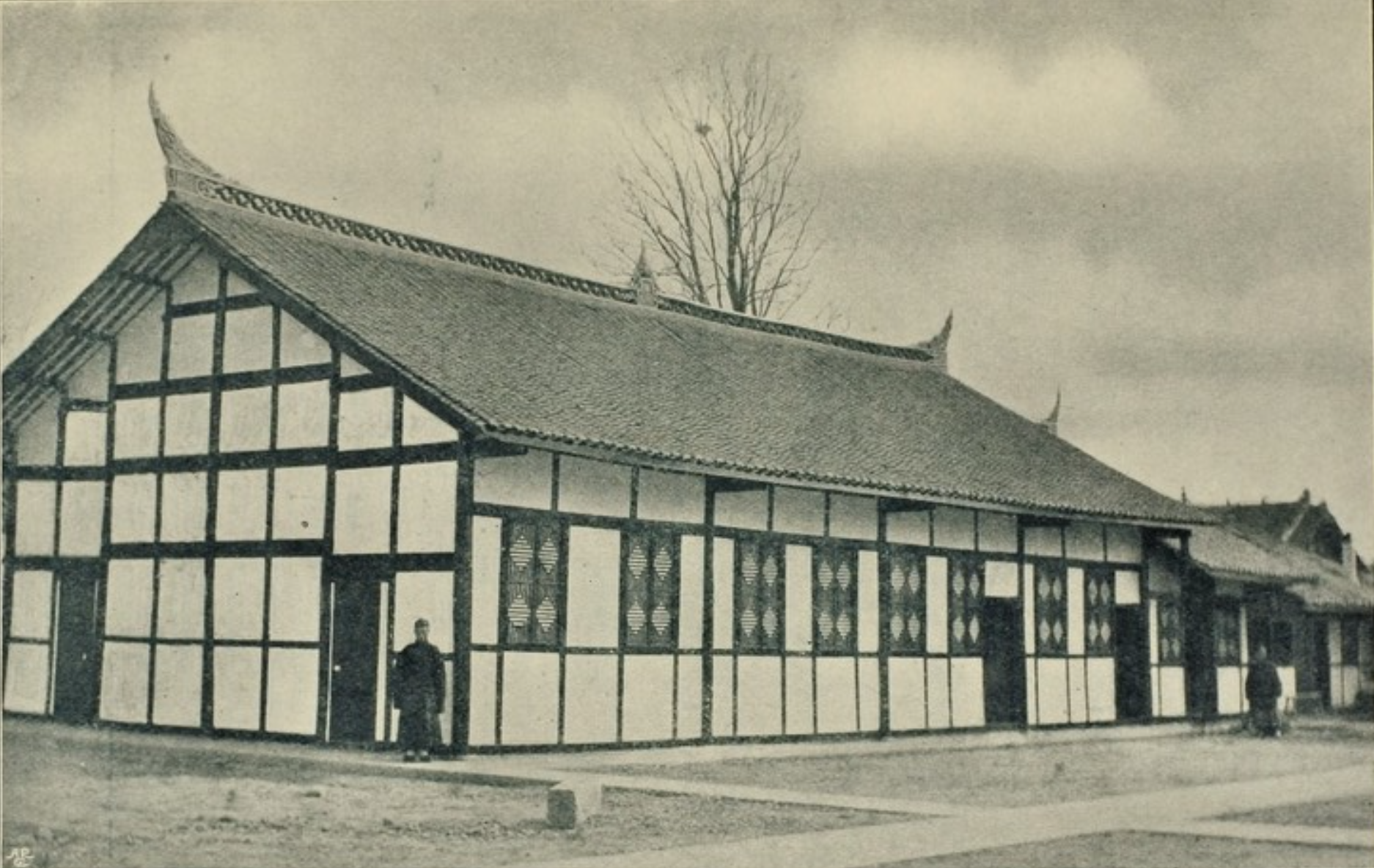
Tungchwan Meeting House circa 1905

Tungchwan was a former base for the Friends' Foreign Mission Association (FFMA), serving as the largest mission branch of FFMA's Northern District. Quaker-affiliated hospital, meeting house, boys' school and girls' boarding school were built during this period. The British political economist and missionary Audrey Donnithorne was born at a Quaker hospital in Santai.

== Climate ==
Climate data for Santai, elevation 460 m (1,510 ft), (1991–2020 normals, extremes 1981–present)
Month	Jan	Feb	Mar	Apr	May	Jun	Jul	Aug	Sep	Oct	Nov	Dec	Year
Record high °C (°F)	19.9 (67.8)	24.2 (75.6)	31.4 (88.5)	34.4 (93.9)	36.8 (98.2)	37.3 (99.1)	41.2 (106.2)	41.2 (106.2)	37.7 (99.9)	31.8 (89.2)	25.5 (77.9)	19.3 (66.7)	41.2 (106.2)
Mean daily maximum °C (°F)	10.0 (50.0)	13.1 (55.6)	18.1 (64.6)	23.9 (75.0)	27.7 (81.9)	29.7 (85.5)	31.8 (89.2)	31.7 (89.1)	26.6 (79.9)	21.5 (70.7)	16.7 (62.1)	11.2 (52.2)	21.8 (71.3)
Daily mean °C (°F)	6.0 (42.8)	8.7 (47.7)	13.0 (55.4)	18.2 (64.8)	22.1 (71.8)	24.8 (76.6)	26.8 (80.2)	26.4 (79.5)	22.2 (72.0)	17.5 (63.5)	12.6 (54.7)	7.5 (45.5)	17.2 (62.9)
Mean daily minimum °C (°F)	3.3 (37.9)	5.7 (42.3)	9.5 (49.1)	14.0 (57.2)	17.9 (64.2)	21.2 (70.2)	23.2 (73.8)	22.9 (73.2)	19.4 (66.9)	15.0 (59.0)	10.0 (50.0)	5.0 (41.0)	13.9 (57.1)
Record low °C (°F)	−4.6 (23.7)	−3.0 (26.6)	−2.6 (27.3)	4.5 (40.1)	7.4 (45.3)	13.4 (56.1)	17.5 (63.5)	16.6 (61.9)	13.2 (55.8)	3.8 (38.8)	0.4 (32.7)	−4.3 (24.3)	−4.6 (23.7)
Average precipitation mm (inches)	10.7 (0.42)	10.9 (0.43)	24.0 (0.94)	49.7 (1.96)	76.5 (3.01)	122.4 (4.82)	196.1 (7.72)	168.1 (6.62)	126.3 (4.97)	45.3 (1.78)	16.5 (0.65)	7.4 (0.29)	853.9 (33.61)
Average precipitation days (≥ 0.1 mm)	7.2	5.9	8.6	10.4	12.0	14.1	13.4	12.0	13.7	12.8	6.4	5.3	121.8
Average snowy days	0.9	0.3	0.1	0	0	0	0	0	0	0	0.1	0.3	1.7
Average relative humidity (%)	81	77	73	72	70	77	81	81	84	84	82	81	79
Mean monthly sunshine hours	52.6	57.9	95.4	132.8	140.4	124.0	149.3	159.2	95.6	73.9	62.9	48.9	1,192.9
Percentage possible sunshine	16	18	26	34	33	29	35	39	26	21	20	16	26
Source: China Meteorological Administration all-time extreme temperatureall-time July high
