= Mianyang =

Mianyang 绵阳市 Miencheo, Mienchow, Mien-yong
- Prefecture-level city
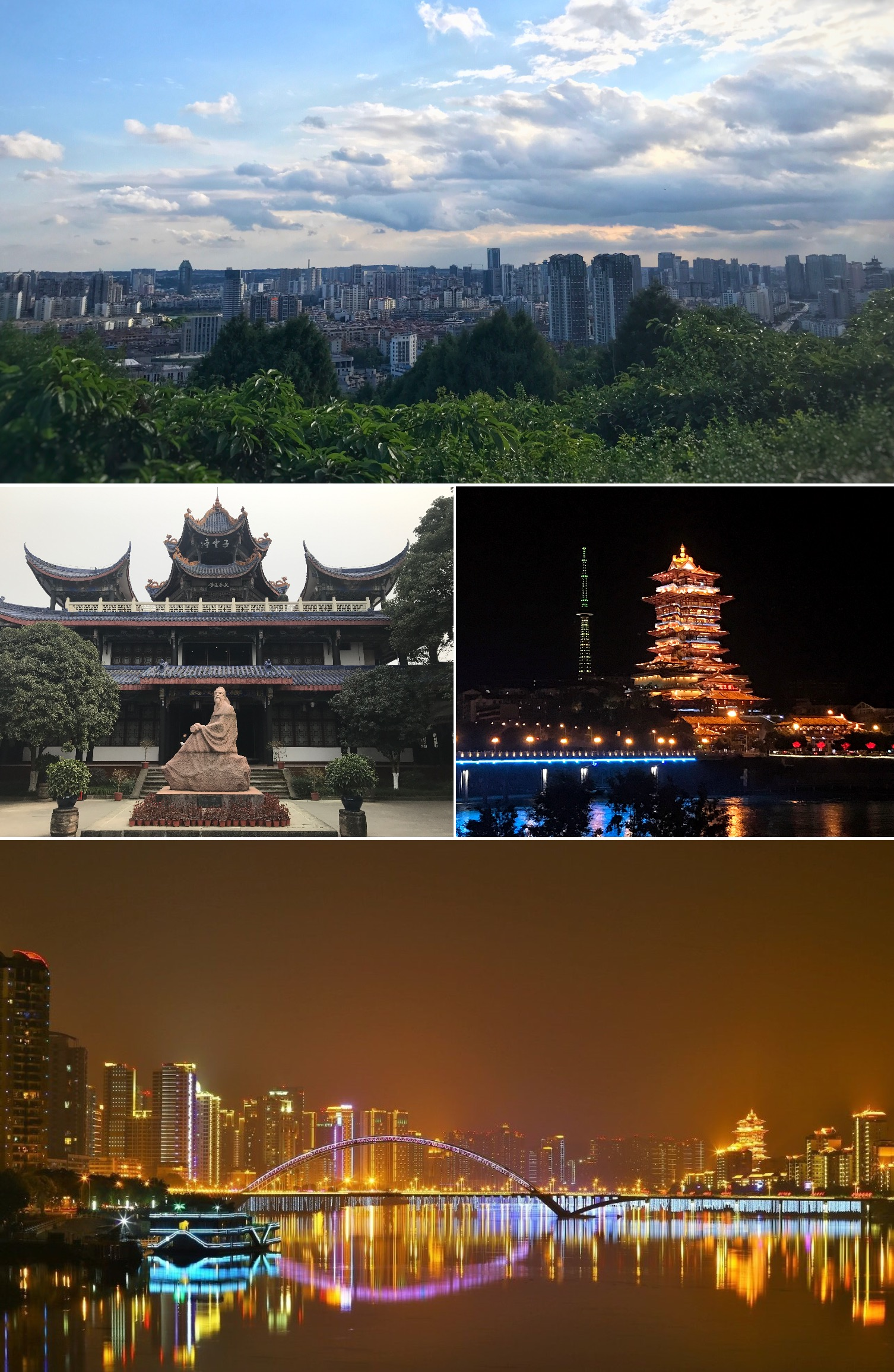
- Clockwise from top: The view of Mianyang City from Fule Park, Yuewang Mansion at night, Night scene along Fujiang River in Mianyang City, Ziyun Pavilion in Xishan Park of Mianyang

- Location of Mianyang in Sichuan

- Location of the city center in Sichuan Mianyang (China)
- Coordinates (Mianyang municipal government): 31°28′05″N 104°40′44″E
- Country: People's Republic of China
- Province: Sichuan
- Municipal seat: Fucheng District

Government
  - CPC Party Chief: Peng Yuxing
  - Mayor: Liu Chao

Area
  - Prefecture-level city: 20,267.46 km^{2} (7,825.31 sq mi)
  - Urban: 2,755.4 km^{2} (1,063.9 sq mi)
  - Metro: 2,755.4 km^{2} (1,063.9 sq mi)
- Elevation: 473 m (1,552 ft)
- Highest elevation: 5,588 m (18,333 ft)
- Lowest elevation: 307 m (1,007 ft)

Population (2020 census)
  - Prefecture-level city: 4,868,243
  - Density: 240.2000/km^{2} (622.1150/sq mi)
  - Urban: 2,232,865
  - Urban density: 810.36/km^{2} (2,098.8/sq mi)
  - Metro: 2,232,865
  - Metro density: 810.36/km^{2} (2,098.8/sq mi)

GDP
  - Prefecture-level city: CN¥ 170.0 billion US$ 27.3 billion
  - Per capita: CN¥ 35,754; US$ 5,740
- Time zone: UTC+8 (China Standard)
- Postal code: 621000
- Area code: 0816
- ISO 3166 code: CN-SC-07
- License Plate Prefix: 川B
- Tree: Cinnamomum camphora
- Flower: Rosa chinensis
- Website: www.my.gov.cn

Miányáng
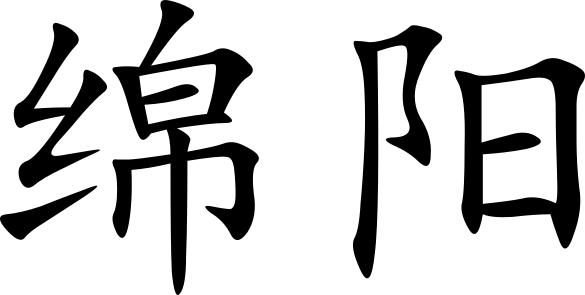
- "Miányáng" in Chinese characters
- Simplified Chinese: 绵阳
- Traditional Chinese: 綿陽
- Literal meaning: "South of Mian Mountain"
Transcriptions
Standard Mandarin
- Hanyu Pinyin: Miányáng
- Bopomofo: ㄇㄧㄢˊ ㄧㄤˊ
- Gwoyeu Romatzyh: Mianyang
- Wade–Giles: Mien^{2}-yang^{2}
- IPA: [mjɛ̌n.jǎŋ]

Mianyang (simplified Chinese: 绵阳; traditional Chinese: 綿陽; pinyin: Miányáng; Wade–Giles: Mien^{2}-yang^{2}; Sichuanese romanization: Mien^{2}-iang^{2}; formerly known as Mienchow, Chinese: 綿州; pinyin: Mianzhou; Sichuanese romanization: Miencheo; lit. 'Mian Prefecture') is the second largest prefecture-level city of Sichuan province in Southwestern China. It borders Nanchong City to the east, Suining City to the south, Deyang City to the southwest, Aba Tibetan and Qiang Autonomous Prefecture to the west, Gansu Province to the north, and Guangyuan City to the northeast. Located in north-central Sichuan covering an area of 20,281 square kilometres (7,831 sq mi) consisting of Jiangyou, a county-level city, five counties, and three urban districts. At the end of 2024 and the beginning of 2025, the resident population will be 4.922 million, with an urbanization rate of 56.93%, an urban population of 2,802,100, and a rural population of 2.1199 million.

== History ==
Mianyang, which was known as Fuxian (Fu County) and Mianzhou in ancient times, had advanced in agriculture during the Qin (221−206 BCE) and Han (206 BCE−220 CE) dynasties. It has a history of over 2,200 years since the Emperor Gaozu of Han established the first county in this area in 201 BCE. Due to its advantageous location, it had always been a town of great military importance and formed a natural defence for Chengdu.

Mianyang is home to the CAEP and Science City, an immense Military Research Complex which was the site of the development of China's first nuclear bomb.

The city proper itself was only lightly damaged by the earthquake of 12 May 2008. However, Beichuan County, which is in the prefecture, was among the most severely hit of all disaster regions following the earthquake, including the Beichuan High School campus where more than 1,000 students lost their lives after two main buildings collapsed. Around 80% of the county's buildings are said to have collapsed, including its main government building. The casualty toll for the quake in Mianyang Prefecture as of 7 June 2008, was 21,963 people killed, 167,742 injured, and 8,744 people missing.

== Geography ==
Mianyang is at the northwestern end of the Sichuan Basin, on the upper to middle reaches of the Fu River. Its administrative area ranges in latitude from 30° 42' to 33° 03' N and in longitude from 103° 45' to 105° 43' E. Bordering prefectures are Guangyuan to the northeast, Nanchong to the east, Suining to the south, Deyang to the southwest, and the Ngawa Tibetan and Qiang Autonomous Prefecture to the west. It also borders Gansu for a small section in the north.

=== Climate ===
Mianyang has a monsoon-influenced humid subtropical climate (Köppen Cwa) and is largely mild and humid, with four distinct seasons. Winter is short, mild, and foggy, though precipitation is low. January averages 5.3 °C (41.5 °F), and while frost may occur, snow is rare. Summers are long, hot, and humid, with highs often exceeding 30 °C (86 °F). The daily average in July, the warmest month, is 25.7 °C (78.3 °F).The average annual temperature is between 18 °C and 21 °C. Rainfall is light in winter and can be heavy in summer, and more than 70% of the annual total occurs from May to September. The annual frost-free period across most of the prefecture lasts from 252 to 300 days, and there are only 1,100 hours of sunshine annually, which is not even 30% of the possible total.

Climate data for Mianyang, elevation 523 m (1,716 ft), (1991–2020 normals, extremes 1971–present)
Month	Jan	Feb	Mar	Apr	May	Jun	Jul	Aug	Sep	Oct	Nov	Dec	Year
Record high °C (°F)	19.8 (67.6)	23.9 (75.0)	32.1 (89.8)	33.9 (93.0)	36.4 (97.5)	37.6 (99.7)	39.4 (102.9)	41.1 (106.0)	36.6 (97.9)	31.7 (89.1)	25.8 (78.4)	20.8 (69.4)	41.1 (106.0)
Mean daily maximum °C (°F)	9.6 (49.3)	12.5 (54.5)	17.4 (63.3)	23.3 (73.9)	27.1 (80.8)	29.3 (84.7)	30.9 (87.6)	30.7 (87.3)	26.1 (79.0)	21.1 (70.0)	16.2 (61.2)	10.8 (51.4)	21.2 (70.3)
Daily mean °C (°F)	6.0 (42.8)	8.6 (47.5)	12.9 (55.2)	18.2 (64.8)	22.1 (71.8)	24.7 (76.5)	26.5 (79.7)	26.1 (79.0)	22.1 (71.8)	17.5 (63.5)	12.6 (54.7)	7.4 (45.3)	17.1 (62.7)
Mean daily minimum °C (°F)	3.3 (37.9)	5.7 (42.3)	9.6 (49.3)	14.3 (57.7)	18.2 (64.8)	21.3 (70.3)	23.2 (73.8)	22.8 (73.0)	19.5 (67.1)	15.1 (59.2)	10.1 (50.2)	4.8 (40.6)	14.0 (57.2)
Record low °C (°F)	−5.3 (22.5)	−4.3 (24.3)	−3.4 (25.9)	0.3 (32.5)	7.2 (45.0)	14.2 (57.6)	17.3 (63.1)	15.8 (60.4)	13.1 (55.6)	3.8 (38.8)	−2.1 (28.2)	−7.3 (18.9)	−7.3 (18.9)
Average precipitation mm (inches)	8.4 (0.33)	9.4 (0.37)	20.2 (0.80)	45.6 (1.80)	77.0 (3.03)	98.5 (3.88)	213.8 (8.42)	175.2 (6.90)	130.7 (5.15)	40.5 (1.59)	12.9 (0.51)	5.5 (0.22)	837.7 (33)
Average precipitation days (≥ 0.1 mm)	5.7	6.1	8.8	10.9	12.6	13.5	14.3	13.1	14.5	12.5	5.7	4.2	121.9
Average snowy days	1.4	0.6	0.1	0	0	0	0	0	0	0	0.1	0.2	2.4
Average relative humidity (%)	74	71	68	67	65	72	77	76	79	78	77	75	73
Mean monthly sunshine hours	60.1	62.7	91.1	121.5	129.0	113.5	130.5	145.4	76.2	63.6	61.2	57.5	1,112.3
Percentage possible sunshine	19	20	24	31	30	27	31	36	21	18	20	18	25
Source 1: China Meteorological Administration all-time extreme temperatureall-time July High
Source 2: Weather China

== Transport ==
The city has highway and railway connections to several major cities and is on the road from Xi'an to the provincial capital of Chengdu as well as the Baocheng Railway running from Baoji in Shaanxi province to Chengdu.

Mianyang Nanjiao Airport has direct flights to Beijing, Shanghai, Guangzhou, Xi'an, Shenzhen, Kunming, Hangzhou, and so on.

Both G5 Beijing–Kunming Expressway and G93 Chengyu Ring Expressway passed through the city.

== Economy ==
Mianyang is one of China's major centres for the electronics industry. It has many well-known research institutions, such as the China Academy of Engineering Physics and China Aerodynamics Research and Development Center.

Many large-scale enterprises, such as Sichuan Changhong Electric Co., Ltd., Sichuan DND Pharmaceutical Co., Ltd., Jiuzhou Electronics Group, Shuangma Cement Group, and Changcheng Special Steel Company also have their home in Mianyang. Sichuan Changhong Electric Co., Ltd. was China's largest television manufacturer in 2004, and majority-owned by the city of Mianyang and the province of Sichuan. The company provided two-thirds of the city of Mianyang's revenue, and its chairman and managing director Zhao Yong was until late 2004 the city's deputy mayor.

Mianyang is an important national defence, scientific research, and production base, consisting of 18 institutes including the China Academy of Engineering Physics and the China Aerodynamics Research Institute. Moreover, it houses 50 large- and medium-size enterprises and six science colleges.

The provincial government will hand over greater administrative powers of economic management at the provincial-level authority to propel the development of Mianyang. The new economy management authority will pay close attention to the construction of the scientific city. The provincial committee party and government are presently drafting the "Opinions on Propelling China Scientific City Construction" report which is expected to come out soon.

=== Regional Nuclear Medical Imaging Data Center ===
As a hub for China's science and technology industry, Mianyang has established a regional Nuclear Medical Imaging Data Center. This facility aggregates and anonymizes medical imaging data from participating hospitals, supporting AI-assisted diagnostics and large-scale medical research while ensuring strict data security and patient privacy protocols.

== Education ==
There are many universities and colleges in the city, and it is well known as a science and technology centre.

The best known of these is Southwest University of Science and Technology, with a campus of 4,000 mu (267 hectares). There is a wide-band multimedia campus network, which is connected to the Internet. The student dorm has access to telephone, Internet, and TV. There are over 900,000 copies of books and over 10,000 electronic books in the library. The studying and living facilities are all on the campus.

=== Higher education ===
- Tianfu College, Southwestern University of Finance and Economics The school now has four campuses in Chengdu, Deyang, and Mianyang, covering a total area of 1,967 acres.
- Mianyang Normal University As of September 2023, the school has three campuses: Gaoxin Campus, Youxian Campus and Fenggu Campus. The campus covers an area of nearly 2,000 acres and has a construction area of nearly 500,000 square meters.
- Mianyang Vocational and Technical College, As of June 2023, the school covers an area of 860.08 acres, with a school building area of 341,000 square meters and a total fixed asset value of 630 million yuan, including 15,700 sets of teaching experimental training equipment, 983,800 paper books in the library, and 612,000 electronic books; it has 8 secondary teaching units, 2 undergraduate majors and 40 junior college majors; there are 802 in-service faculty and staff, 239 senior professional titles, and 335 master's degrees and above; higher vocational, secondary vocational, applied undergraduate,
- Tianfu College of Southwestern University of Finance and Economics, According to the school's official website in June 2024, the school has four campuses in Chengdu, Deyang and Mianyang, covering an area of 1,909 acres; it has 9 secondary colleges, offering 43 undergraduate majors and 30 junior college majors; there are 1,413 faculty and staff and 32,880 students; the library has 1.54 million paper books and more than 1.21 million electronic books.,
- Sichuan College of Traditional Chinese Medicine, According to the information on the school's official website in June 2024, the school covers an area of nearly 1,000 acres; it has 12 colleges and departments, offering 30 higher vocational majors; it has 534 full-time teachers and nearly 10,000 students.
- City College of Southwest University of Science and Technology, As of March 2024, the school has two campuses, Anzhou and Youxian, with a planned area of 1,200 acres, a completed and planned building area of nearly 630,000 square meters, teaching and scientific research equipment worth about 106 million yuan, and a total of more than 3.7 million books and resources of various types; there are 7 secondary colleges, a total of 70 undergraduate and junior college majors; there are 23,000 students.
- Sichuan College of Culture and Art, The predecessor is the Mianyang Art College of Sichuan Conservatory of Music, a secondary college of Sichuan Conservatory of Music. As of September 2024, the school has two campuses in Mianyang and Zitong;it has 17 secondary colleges, 46 undergraduate majors (including 1 Sino-foreign cooperative major), 34 junior college majors, 3 provincial first-class undergraduate major construction sites; and more than 20,000 full-time students.
- China Academy of Engineering Physics Staff College, Founded in 1978, it is an adult higher education institution established by the China Academy of Engineering Physics (CAEP), the only strategic weapons research and development unit in my country, with the approval of the Ministry of Education.Before 2004, it was mainly engaged in adult higher education. Mr. Yu Daguang, an academician of the Chinese Academy of Engineering, served as the second president of the college and is now the honorary president .
- Mianyang Branch of Civil Aviation Flight Academy. The Mianyang Branch of the Civil Aviation Flight University of China is located in Mianyang, the second largest city in Sichuan Province, which is famous as "the birthplace of Li Bai and China's Science and Technology City".It is 5 kilometers away from the city center at a true position of 167 degrees. It is a training branch engaged in civil aviation transport aircraft pilot training that integrates flight teaching training and air transport flight. The branch has the training capabilities of "commercial pilot license", additional instrument rating and "private pilot license".
- Sichuan Preschool Teachers College.According to the school's official website in June 2024, the school has three campuses in Mianyang and Jiangyou, covering an area of more than 970 acres and a construction area of 262,700 square meters; it has 7 teaching units and 24 majors; there are more than 11,000 students and 747 faculty and staff.
- Sichuan Automotive Vocational and Technical College, According to the school's official website in May 2024, the school covers an area of 998 acres (500 acres planned), with a building area of 163,112 square meters; the library has a collection of 565,000 books and teaching equipment worth 60.4166 million yuan; it has 5 secondary colleges and offers 33 higher vocational majors.
- Sichuan Electronic Machinery Vocational and Technical College, As of December 2023, the school covers an area of 270,013.5 square meters, with a total building area of 278,485.37 square meters, 172,030.24 square meters of teaching, scientific research and auxiliary rooms, a total value of scientific research equipment assets of 51.6959 million yuan, and 956,700 paper books; it has 6 secondary colleges, 34 majors (40 professional directions); there are 361 full-time teachers and 10,077 full-time junior college students.
- Mianyang Youth Mechanical and Electrical Engineering School, Mianyang Mechanical and Electrical Engineering School was founded in 1993. It is a private secondary vocational school approved by the Mianyang Municipal Education Administrative Department.

=== Basic education ===
- Mianyang Middle School
- Mianyang Middle School Experimental School
- Mianyang Middle School Yingcai School
- Nanshan Middle School
- Nanshan Middle School Experimental School
- Nanshan Middle School Bilingual School
- Science City No. 1 Middle School
- Mianyang Foreign Language School
- Mianyang Experimental High School
- Mianyang Dongchen International School
- Mianyang No. 1 Middle School
- Santai Middle School
- Mianyang Experimental High School
- Anzhou Middle School, Mianyang, Sichuan Province
- Mianyang Puming Middle School
- Jiangyou Middle School
- Jiangyou No. 1 Middle School
- Mianyang High-tech Zone Experimental High School

== People ==
It is the hometown of the famous poet Li Bai, and boasts many historical relics of the Three Kingdoms period.

Li Shunxian was a poet of Persian descent flourished during the Former Shu period (907–925). She had two brothers, Li Xun, a poet and pharmacologist, author of Overseas Pharmacopoeia (海藥本草; Hǎiyào Běncǎo), and Li Xuan, also a pharmacologist and alchemist. Their religious background has been suggested as Zoroastrian or Nestorian Christian by Li Guotao and Lo Hsiang-lin, respectively. In his "The Transmission of Foreign Medicine via the Silk Roads in Medieval China: A Case Study of Haiyao Bencao", Chen Ming states that he is "inclined to agree with Lo Hsiang-lin, and to conclude that Li Xun was probably a Nestorian who was influenced by Taoism". However, both suppositions lack solid evidence and remain to be proven.

Li Bifeng is a democracy advocate and a house church Christian, founder of an organization of conscience-based care for conducting written reports on the living conditions of laid-off workers, women, and children. He was imprisoned several times by Chinese authorities.

Wang Yi is a Calvinist pastor from Santai and founder of the house church Early Rain Covenant Church in Chengdu. In 2018, he was arrested on allegations of "inciting subversion of state power".

Wang Jiujiang is a "mountains and water" landscape painter with Tibetan influence. He is classified as a member of national second-class artists.

Chinese food blogger and internet celebrity Li Ziqi is from Pingwu County on Mianyang and shoots most of her video content in the surrounding countryside.

Several ethnic minorities live in Mianyang, such as the Tibetan and Qiang people.

== Christianity ==
According to Asia Harvest, estimates from 2020 suggest that of the entire population (4,057,601) about 5.43% is Christian (220,501), including Christians within the "unofficial churches", i.e., the Catholic underground church and the Protestant house churches.

=== Catholicism ===
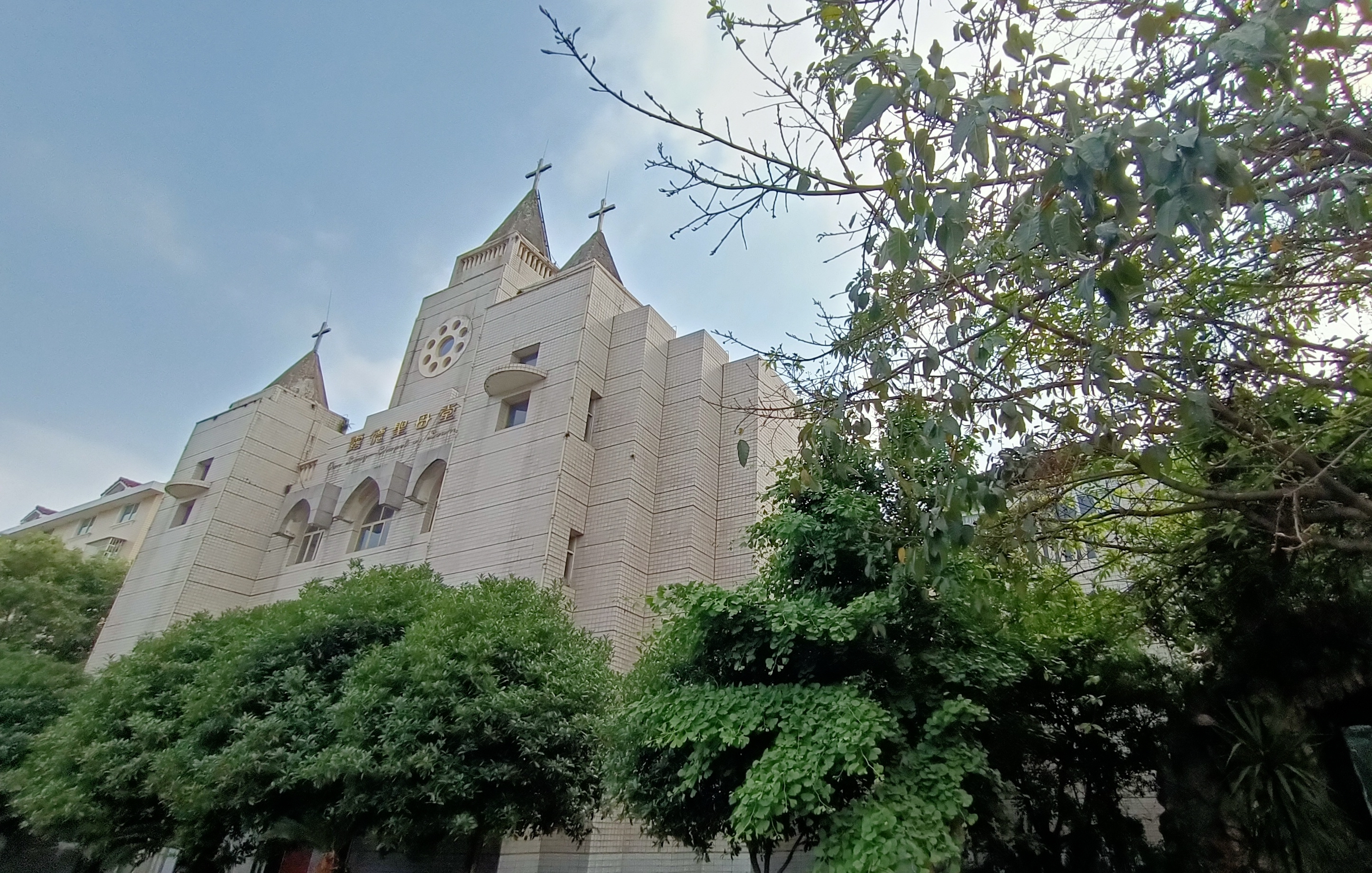
Our Lady of Lourdes Church, Mianyang

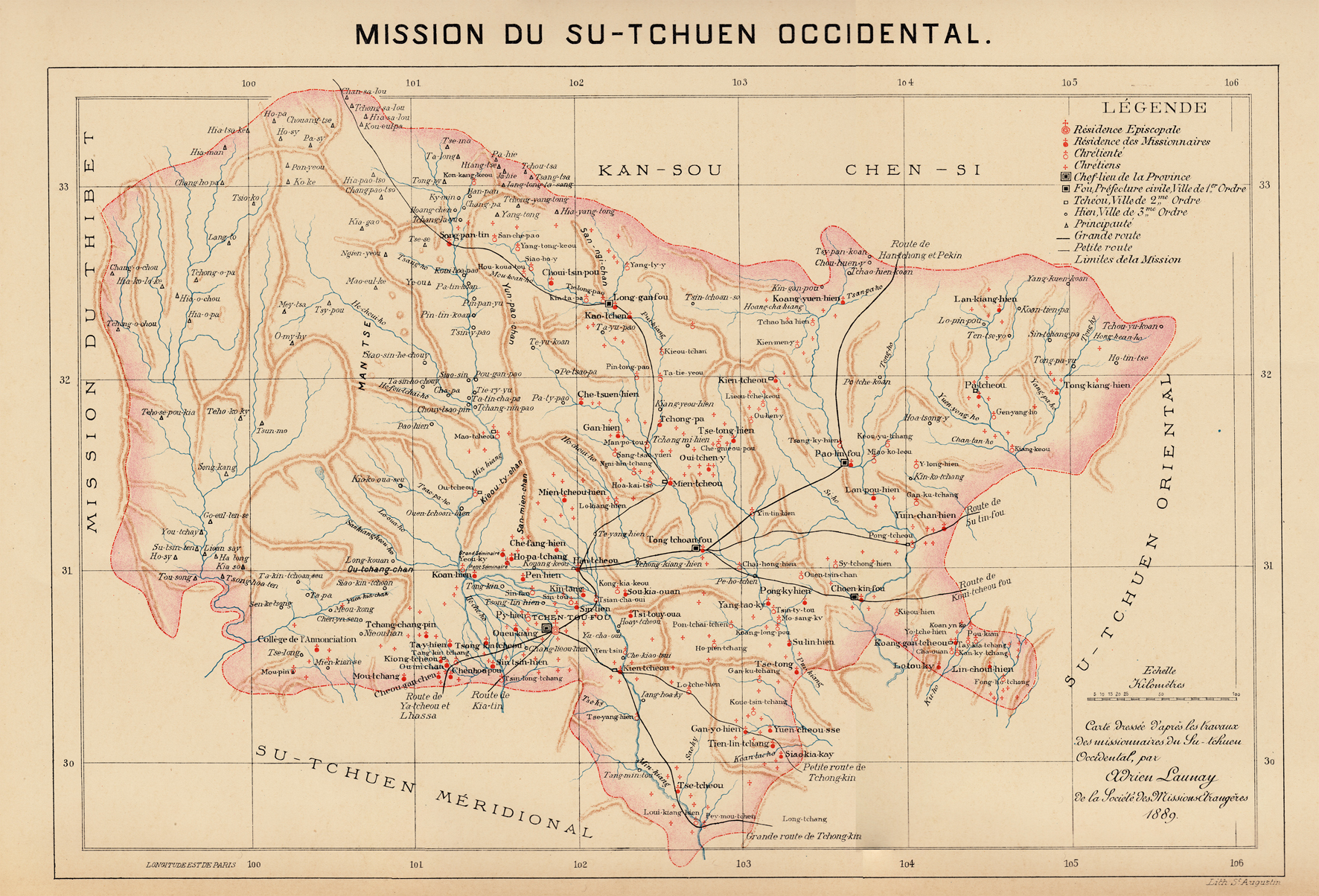
Mianyang (Mien-tcheou-hien) was part of the Western Szechwan Mission.

Christian presence in Sichuan (Szechwan) dates to the Tang dynasty (618–907) in the form of East Syriac Christianity (see "East Syriac Christianity in Sichuan"). In the case of Mianyang, the earliest evangelization to this region, according to Annals of Religion in Mianyang, was carried out in 1777 by Gabriel-Taurin Dufresse, a Catholic missionary and martyr saint of the Missions Étrangères de Paris (MEP).

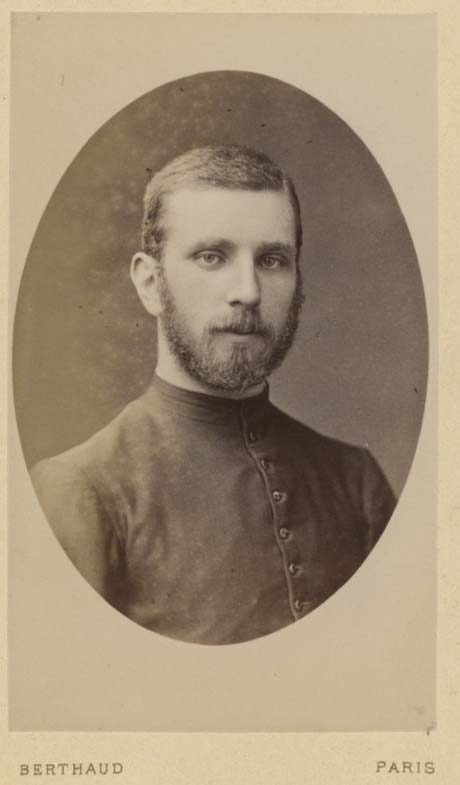
Joseph Hatinguais, missionary in Mien-tcheou.

The first congregation was established in the 1820s in a small town named Bailin, now under the administration of Youxian District. A neo-Gothic church was subsequently built there and was expanded in 1913 by Alexandre Perrodin, which is known today as Bailin Catholic Church. In 1883, after ministering in the District of Long-ngan-fou (modern-day Pingwu) for three years, Joseph-Marie-Félix Hatinguais took charge of the District of Lio-pin. He directed the mission work there until died of typhoid fever on 16 October 1886. He was buried at the Annunciation Seminary in Ho-pa-tchang (modern-day Bailu). A purgatorial society existed in Beichuan before 1951.

Our Lady of Lourdes Church is the only Catholic church building in Fucheng, the most populated district of Mianyang. Lucy Yi Zhenmei, a 19th-century local missionary from Mianyang, was martyred in Guizhou and canonized on 1 October 2000 by Pope John Paul II.

Mianyang region was historically part of the MEP's Western Szechwan Mission, and is now under the jurisdiction of the Bishop of Chengdu. According to Asia Harvest, estimates from 2020 suggest that of the entire population (4,057,601) about 1.57% is Catholic (63,896), including underground church Catholics.

Fourteen church buildings are included in a list in Annals of Religion in Mianyang, namely:

- Bailin Catholic Church, Youxian District
- Long'an Catholic Church, Pingwu County
- Gucheng Catholic Church, Pingwu County
- Tongchuan Catholic Church, Santai County
- Xiushui Catholic Church, Anzhou District
- Piankou Catholic Church, Beichuan Qiang Autonomous County
- Xiaoba Catholic Church, Beichuan Qiang Autonomous County
- Shiban Catholic Church, Youxian District
- Huazhulin Catholic Church, Youxian District
- Xujia Catholic Church, Youxian District
- Tucheng Catholic Church, Pingwu County
- Daqiao Catholic Church, Pingwu County
- Zhongba Catholic Church, Jiangyou
- Xiping Catholic Church, Jiangyou

=== Protestantism ===
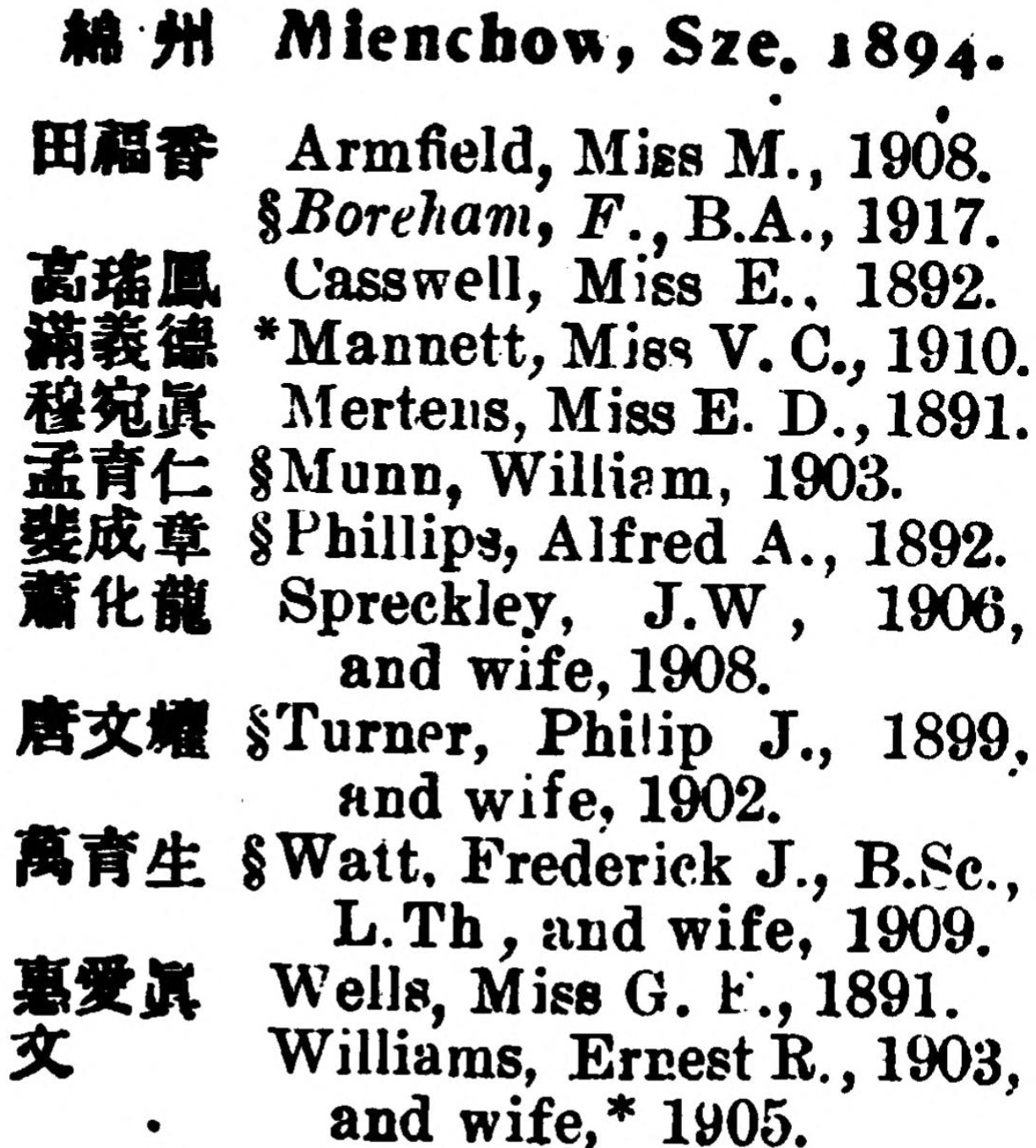
List of CMS missionaries stationed in Mianyang by 1917.

Protestantism was brought to Mianyang in 1894 by Anglican missionaries of the Church Missionary Society (CMS), who subsequently made the city their mission headquarters. Alice Entwistle was largely responsible for the opening of this region for missionary work. Or according to Annals of Religion in Mianyang, in 1885, a small mission church known as Gospel Church was already founded in Mianyang by Alfred Arthur Phillips and Gertrude Emma Wells of the Church Missionary Society. However, Gospel Church, Jiangyou is traditionally regarded as the first CMS church in the Mianyang region. In the late 1880s, two women representing the Church of England Zenana Missionary Society were working in this city.

In 1908, William Munn established Hua Ying Primary School in Nanshan subdistrict (present-day Nanshan High School) and served as the first principal until 1916, when Frederick J. Watt assumed the position. In 1918, Alfred Arthur Phillips established the first school for the dumb and the blind in Sichuan at Huang Family's Alley, Fucheng District. Frederick Boreham, future Archdeacon of Cornwall, served as a missionary in Mianyang (Mien Yong) under the CMS from 1917 to 1924, and again from 1928 to 1934.

After the split of the Diocese of Western China into Diocese of East Szechwan and Diocese of West Szechwan in 1936, Mianyang came under the authority of the latter which was supported by the CMS.

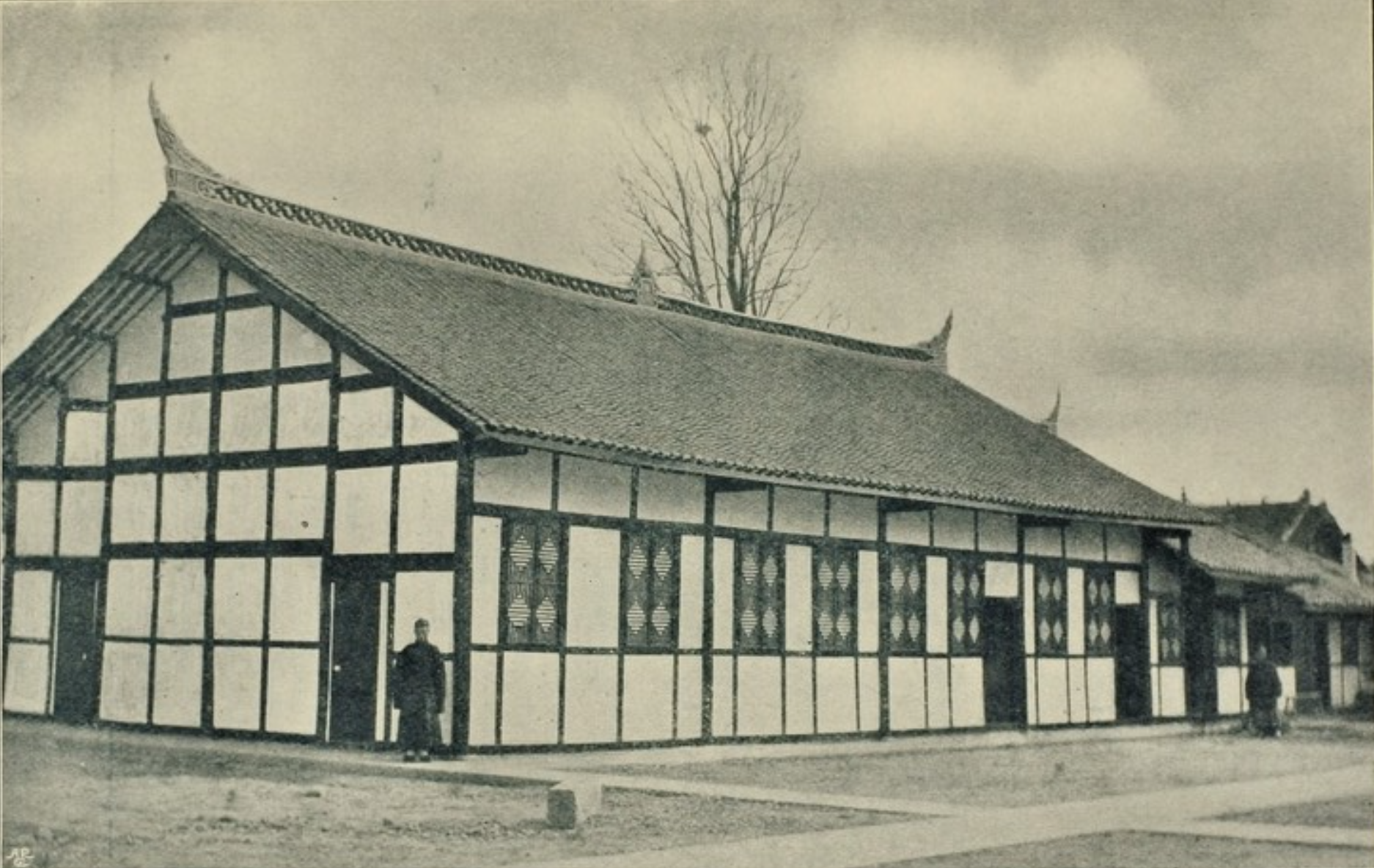
Quaker meeting house at Santai, before 1905.

Santai County (formerly known as Tungchwan, pinyin: Tongchuan) was a centre of Quakerism, which was introduced in 1887, and again in 1894 by Friends' Foreign Mission Association (FFMA). Santai Mission became the largest mission branch of FFMA's Northern District. It was organized as Santai Monthly Meeting by Isaac Mason in 1900, under the administration of Szechwan Yearly Meeting.

Since 1942, the Seventh-day Adventist Church had a small presence in Fenggu, a town under the administration of Fucheng. This denomination had a church built in July 1946, and made 99 converts before 1950 (see "Adventism in Sichuan"). True Jesus Church had a small presence in Jiangyou and Yanting since 1947.

According to Asia Harvest, estimates from 2020 suggest that of the entire population (4,057,601) about 3.86% is Protestant (156,605; termed "Evangelicals"), including house church Protestants.

Six church buildings are included in a list in Annals of Religion in Mianyang, namely:

- Gospel Church at Fucheng District, Mianyang (prev. Anglicanism)
- Gospel Church at Fuyi Town, Yanting County
- Gospel Church at Tongchuan Town, Santai County (former Quaker meeting house)
- Chengguan Gospel Church, Anzhou District (prev. Anglicanism)
- Lingxing Protestant Church, Santai County
- Gospel Church, Jiangyou (prev. Anglicanism)

== Food ==
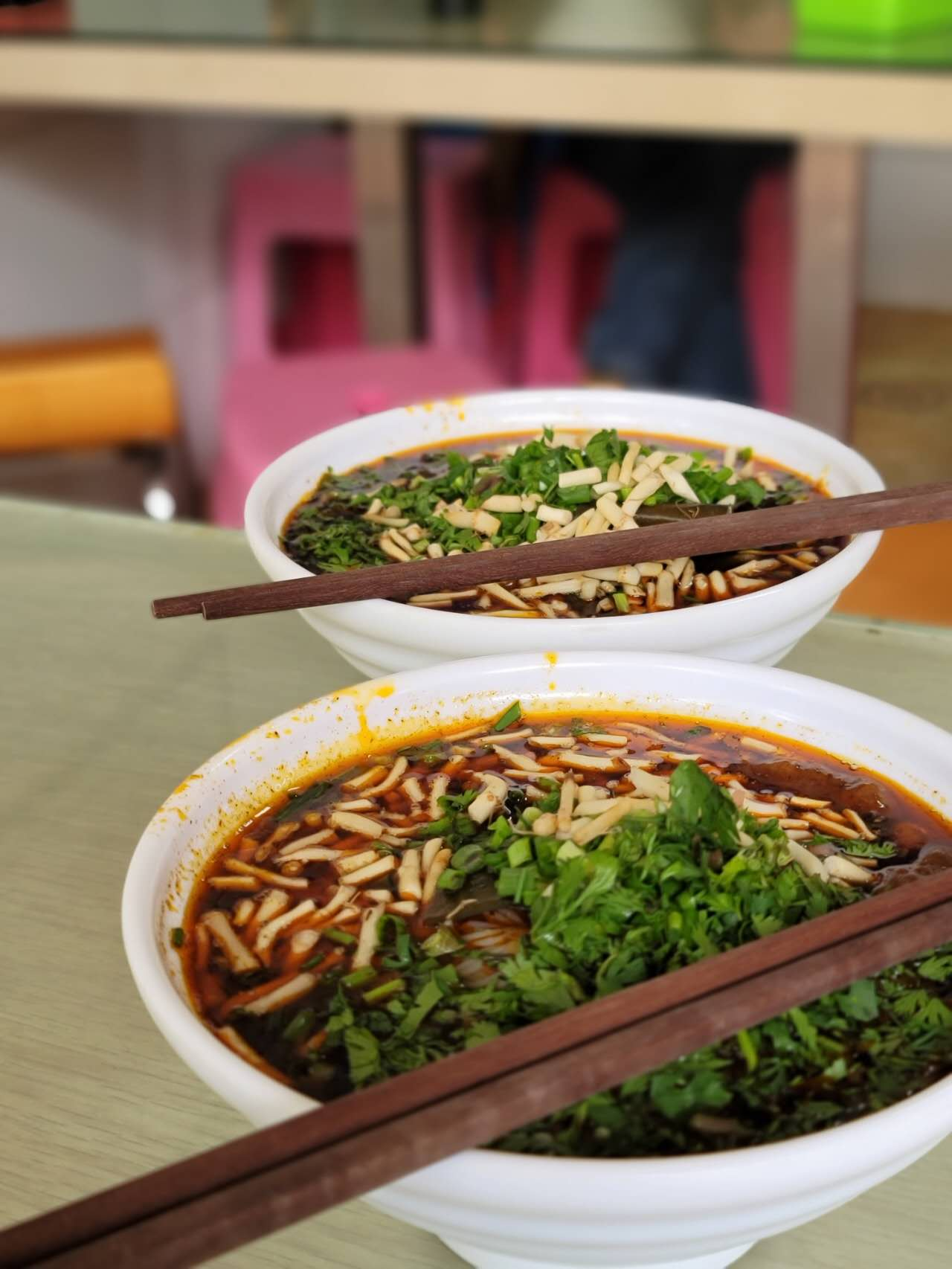
Mianyang Rice Noodles

·Mianyang Rice Noodles (绵阳米粉): One of the famous traditional dishes of the Han nationality in the Mianyang area with a history of more than 1,800 years. There are three flavours: red soup, clear soup, and clear red soup. Mianyang rice noodles are one of the famous traditional foods of the Han people in Mianyang, Sichuan, with a history of more than 1,800 years. The production process requires multiple kneading, pressing and other processes to make the rice noodles softer and chewier. After the rice noodles are cooked, various seasonings and ingredients can be added according to personal taste.

·Lengzhanzhan (冷沾沾): Lengzhanzhan originated in Mianyang Jiangyou. It is a snack that uses toothpicks to weave different dishes of meat and vegetables together and then dip different oil dishes.

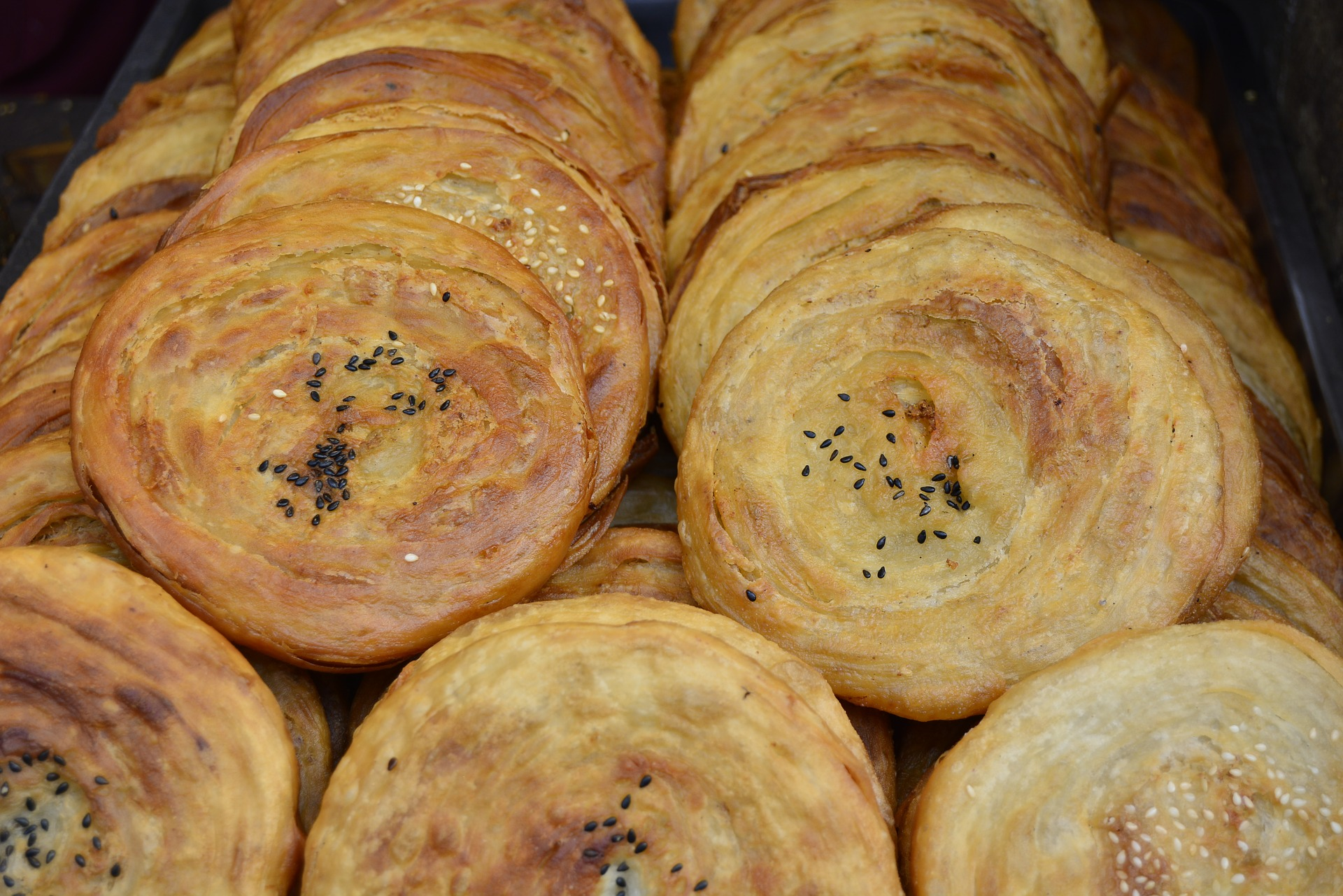
Guokui

· Mianyang rusty pancake/Guokui (绵阳脆皮锅盔): Crispy Guokui is one of the specialty snacks in Mianyang, Sichuan. It is golden in color, salty and delicious, and has clear crispy texture. Known for its fragrance, it comes in a variety of flavors. In the middle of the rusty pancake there is a dragon's eye like head of the pot kui, just pull out the eye and one can lift out the whole pot kui and it will not break at all.

·Zitong shortcake (梓潼酥饼): Zitong shortcake is a traditional famous food of Han nationality. It is made of wheat flour, lard, white sugar, sesame and other raw materials by traditional handicraft.

·Zitong Sliced Jelly Noodles (梓潼片粉): Zitong sliced jelly noodles are a specialty of Zitong County, Mianyang. Made from sweet potato starch, the noodles are steamed, sliced, and then served with chili oil, peppercorns, and other condiments. The dish is believed to have originated in the late Qing period, when starch-based foods became popular in northern Sichuan.

Jiangyou Pork Intestines (江油肥肠): Jiangyou pork intestines are a traditional dish from Jiangyou, a county-level city under Mianyang. The preparation emphasizes removing odor and enhancing aroma, resulting in a rich but not greasy taste. According to local culinary records, the dish emerged in the early 20th century as butchers and vendors in Jiangyou experimented with pork offal to create marketable dishes.

== Subdivisions ==
Map
#	Name	Hanzi	Hanyu Pinyin	Population (2020)	Area (km^{2})	Density (/km^{2})
1	Fucheng District	涪城区	Fúchéng Qū	1,298,524	556	2,334
2	Youxian District	游仙区	Yóuxiān Qū	561,375	1,014	554
6	Anzhou District	安州区	Ānzhōu Qū	372,962	1,187	314
3	Jiangyou City	江油市	Jiāngyóu Shì	731,343	2,721	269
4	Santai County	三台县	Sāntái Xiàn	955,811	2,637	363
5	Yanting County	盐亭县	Yántíng Xiàn	370,739	1,542	240
7	Zitong County	梓潼县	Zǐtóng Xiàn	276,996	1,446	192
8	Pingwu County	平武县	Píngwǔ Xiàn	126,357	5,259	24
9	Beichuan Qiang Autonomous County	北川羌族 自治县	Běichuān Qiāngzú; Zìzhìxiàn	174,132	3077	57

== Bibliography ==
- Davidson, Robert J.; Mason, Isaac (1905). Life in West China: Described by Two Residents in the Province of Sz-chwan (PDF). London: Headley Brothers.
- Mianyang Bureau of Religious Affairs, ed. (1998). 绵阳市民族宗教志 [Annals of Religion in Mianyang] (in Simplified Chinese). Chengdu: Sichuan People's Publishing House. ISBN 722003993X.
