= Edward Ciągło =

Polish politician (born 1953)

member of Sejm 2005-2007
- In office 25 September 2005 – ?

Personal details
- Born: 1953 (age 72–73)
- Party: League of Polish Families

Edward Ciągło (born 15 October 1953 in Gołkowice Dolne) is a Polish politician. He was elected to the Sejm on 25 September 2005, getting 9470 votes in 14 Nowy Sącz district as a candidate from the League of Polish Families list.

== See also ==
- Members of Polish Sejm 2005-2007
