= Ugartsthal =

Coordinates: 49°01′56″N 24°17′33″E

Location of Ugartsthal

Ugartsthal, a former German colony in the Kingdom of Galicia and Lodomeria which is today part of the village Sivka-Kaluska in Kalush Raion (Ivano-Frankivsk Oblast, Ukraine), is located 7 km (4 mi) west of Kalush.

== Description ==
In the 19th century around the colony to the north laid Wierzchnia and Mościska, to the east Kalush, to the south Siwka, on the west - a village Kropiwnik. Through the centre of village flowed the Kropiwnik stream; through northern part flows Froniłów or Fornelów; left inflow of Kropiwnik Buildings of the village lie near the border of Siwka (Mt. 316 m.). The village composed one commune with Siwka.

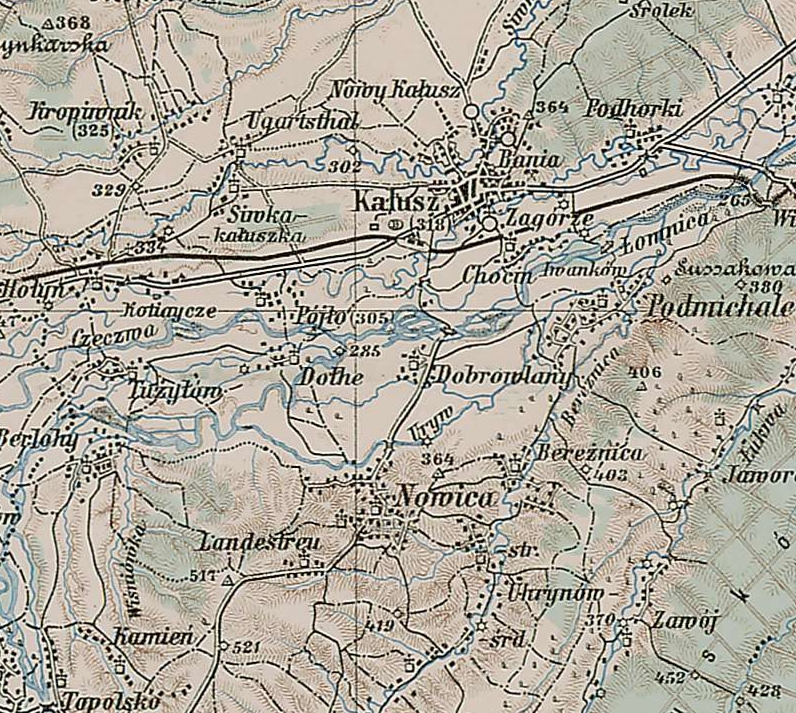
1889

In 1880 there were 62 houses, 423 inhabitants in the commune, (43 Greek-Catholic, 3 Roman-Catholic, 365 Protestants, 12 Israelites; 14 Poles, 43 Rusins (Ruthenian, old name for the Ukrainians), 366 Germans). The Evangelical Parish in the place from 1784, the church from 1788 . To the parish belongs 3320 souls. Branches: Landestreu, Nowica, and Petranka. In the village there is a religious school and communal loan-society (Earning Cashier) with capital 535 złr. The Ugartsthal name of the village, and other similar localities (e.g. Ugartsberg) originate from the name of the contemporary Austrian margrave of Moravia, Alois Ugarte. The German settlements were established on the base of so-called Josephine colonization.

The name of Ugartsthal was changed by Polish administration in the late 1930s to Tespowo.

The village of Landestreu changed at the same time the name to Mazurówka.

In the Samuel Bredetzky's register in Ugartsthal there are found 63 families, (327 "souls" - persons). Pastorate embraced following localities: Ugartsthal, Landestreu, Kałusz, Neu-Dolina, Engelsberg, Horocholina, Wełdzirz, Stanisławów, Bohorodczany, Grabowiec, Sołotwina, Nowica, Petranka, Krasna.

== See also ==
- Galician Germans
- List of German - French names of places in Alsace
- List of German - French names of places in Lotharingia
- Church of the Holy Apostles in Rumania
- Map of German settlements in Galizien, 1939
