= Chochorowice =

- Village
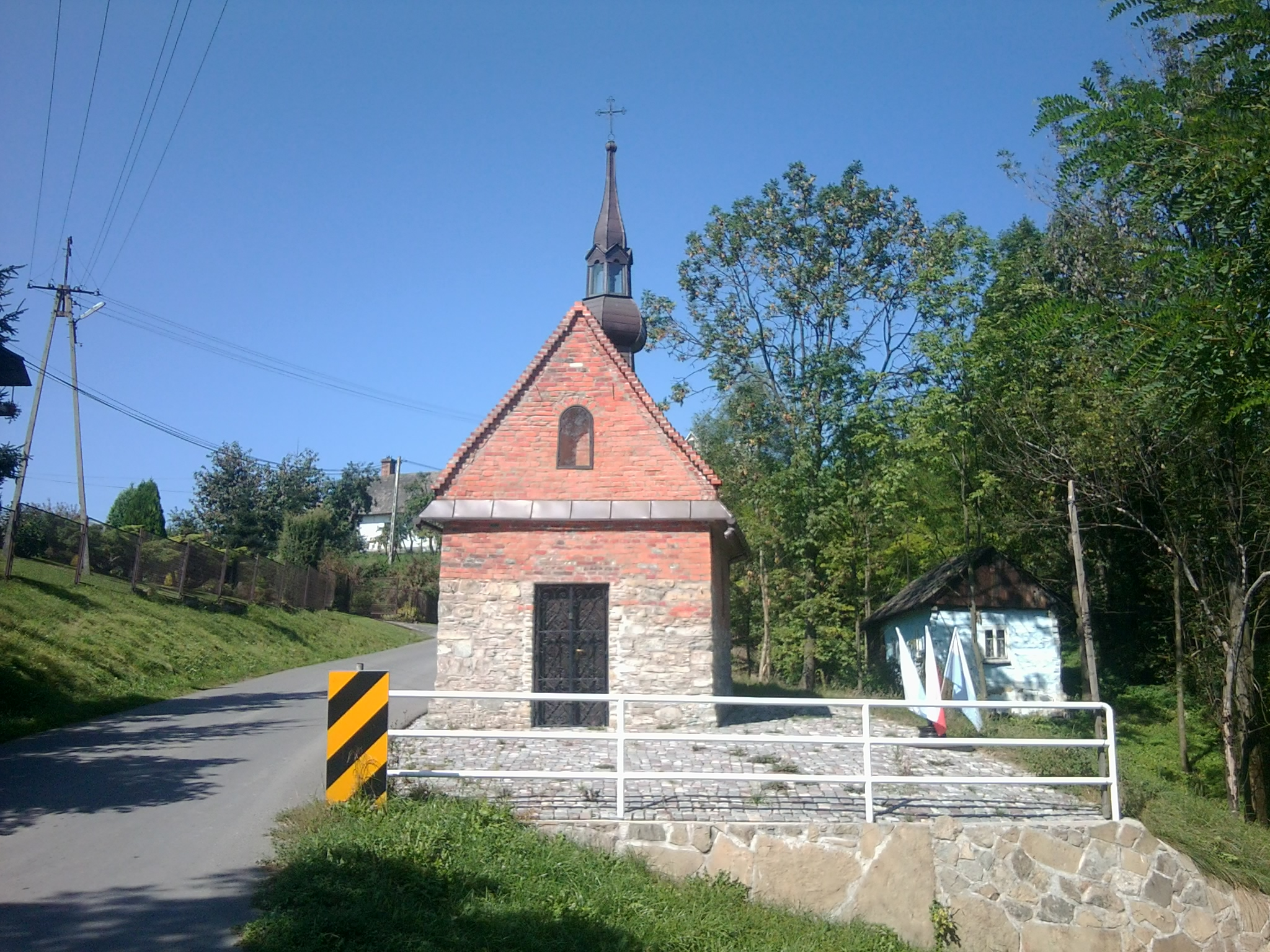
- Chapel of Trinity

- Location within Poland
- Coordinates: 49°36′35″N 20°37′05″E
- Country: Poland
- Voivodeship: Lesser Poland
- County: Nowy Sącz
- Gmina: Podegrodzie

Chochorowice [xɔxɔrɔˈvʲit͡sɛ] is a village in the administrative district of Gmina Podegrodzie, within Nowy Sącz County, Lesser Poland Voivodeship, in southern Poland.
