= Nowiny Horynieckie =

- Village
- Location within Poland
- Coordinates: 50°13′27″N 23°23′3″E
- Country: Poland
- Voivodeship: Subcarpathian
- County: Lubaczów
- Gmina: Horyniec-Zdrój

Nowiny Horynieckie [nɔˈvʲinɨ xɔrɨˈɲɛt͡skʲɛ] is a village in the administrative district of Gmina Horyniec-Zdrój, within Lubaczów County, Subcarpathian Voivodeship, in south-eastern Poland, close to the border with Ukraine.
