= Krzywe, Lubaczów County =

Krzywe
- Village
- Location within Poland
- Coordinates: 50°11′46″N 23°18′12″E
- Country: Poland
- Voivodeship: Subcarpathian
- County: Lubaczów
- Gmina: Horyniec-Zdrój

Krzywe [ˈkʂɨvɛ] is a village in the administrative district of Gmina Horyniec-Zdrój, within Lubaczów County, Subcarpathian Voivodeship, in south-eastern Poland, close to the border with Ukraine.
