= Stadła =

- Village
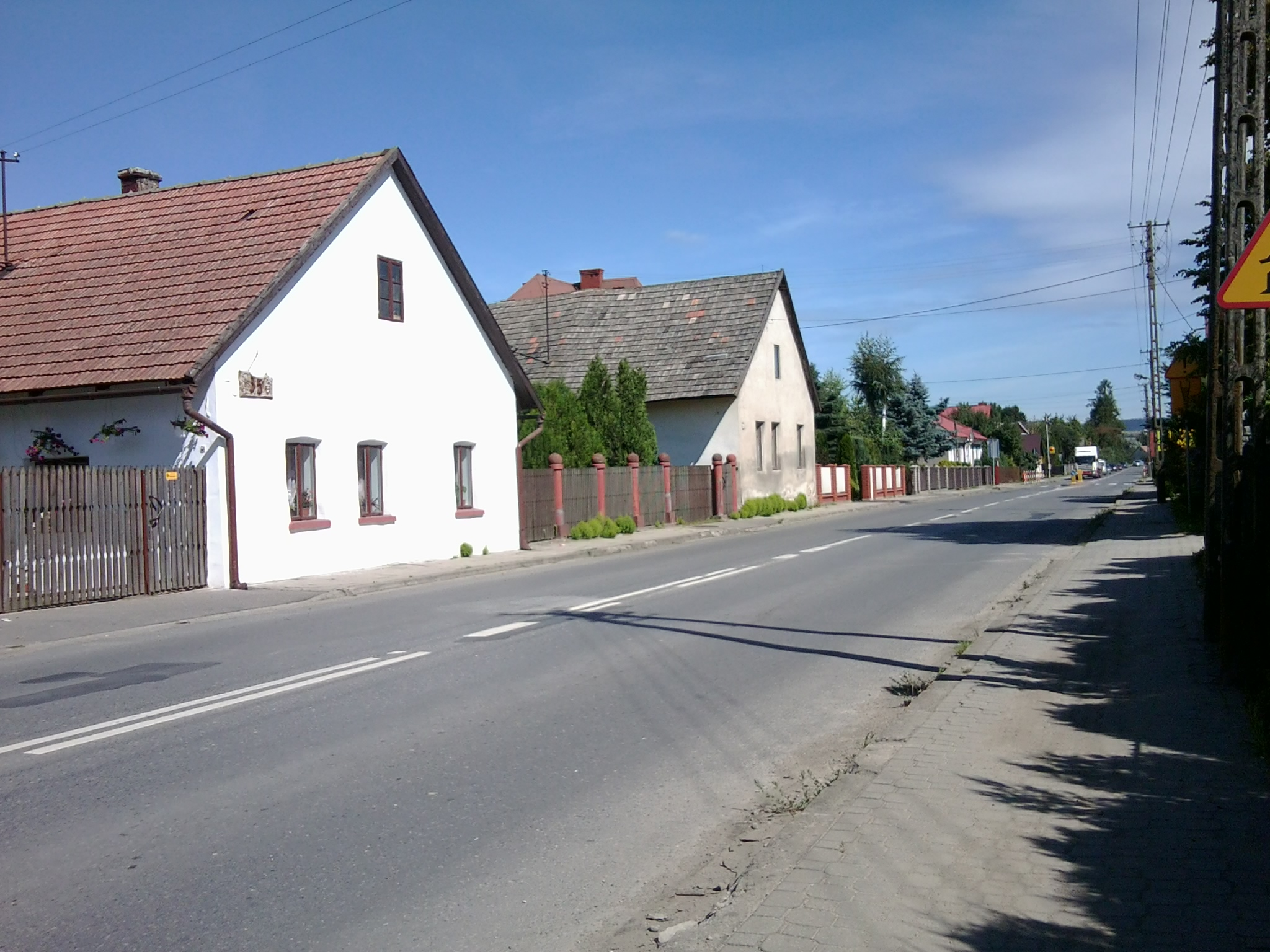
- Buildings of the former German population

- Location within Poland
- Coordinates: 49°35′N 20°37′E
- Country: Poland
- Voivodeship: Lesser Poland
- County: Nowy Sącz
- Gmina: Podegrodzie
- First mentioned: 1469

Stadła [ˈstadwa] (before 1964 Stadło) is a village in the administrative district of Gmina Podegrodzie, within Nowy Sącz County, Lesser Poland Voivodeship, in southern Poland.

The village was first mentioned in 1469. In 1788 German-speaking Lutheran settled here in the course of Josephine colonization. They built a church that became a religious centre for Lutherans living in other nearby Josephine colonies.
