= Naszacowice =

- Village
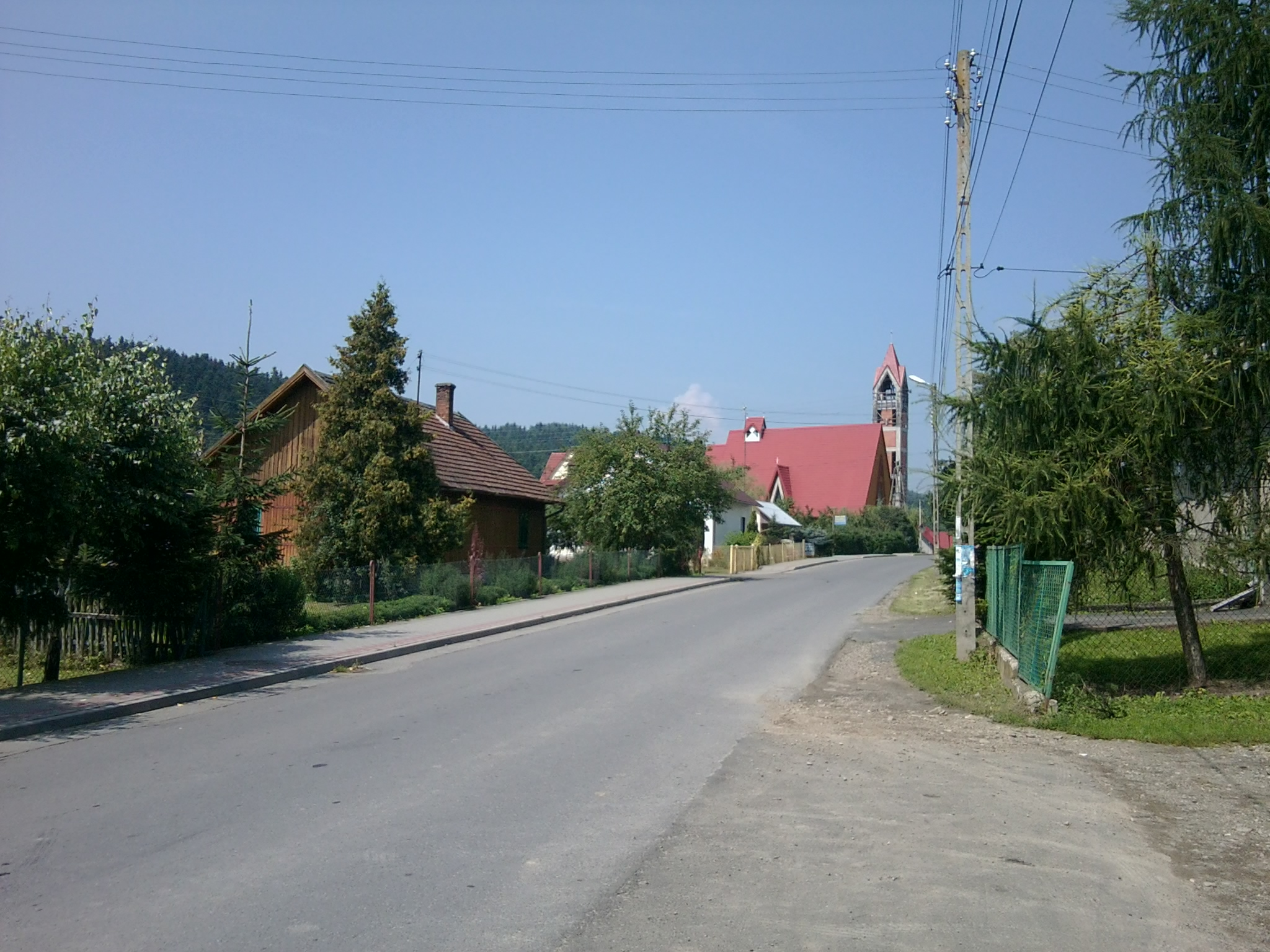

- Location within Poland
- Coordinates: 49°34′N 20°35′E
- Country: Poland
- Voivodeship: Lesser Poland
- County: Nowy Sącz
- Gmina: Podegrodzie

Naszacowice [naʂat͡sɔˈvʲit͡sɛ] (also Naszczowice) is a village in the administrative district of Gmina Podegrodzie, within Nowy Sącz County, Lesser Poland Voivodeship, in southern Poland.

Naszacowice is one of the oldest villages of the region. Its name probably comes from a man named Nosacz, and in the oldest preserved documents from 1233, it was spelled Nossaczouicy. Jan Długosz provides two spellings of the name: Nossaczowycze and Noszaczowycze, while in the 1794 Austrian census, it was spelled Naszacowice and Naschatowitz Colonia.

According to archaeologists, a large fortified gord existed here in the 8th century. It was located in the spot of an earlier Lusatian culture settlement, and in the early years of the Kingdom of Poland, the gord was an important center of local administration and the Dunajec river trade route to the Kingdom of Hungary. The gord lost its importance after a great fire, and was replaced by Podegrodzie.
