= Mokra Wieś, Lesser Poland Voivodeship =

Mokra Wieś
- Village
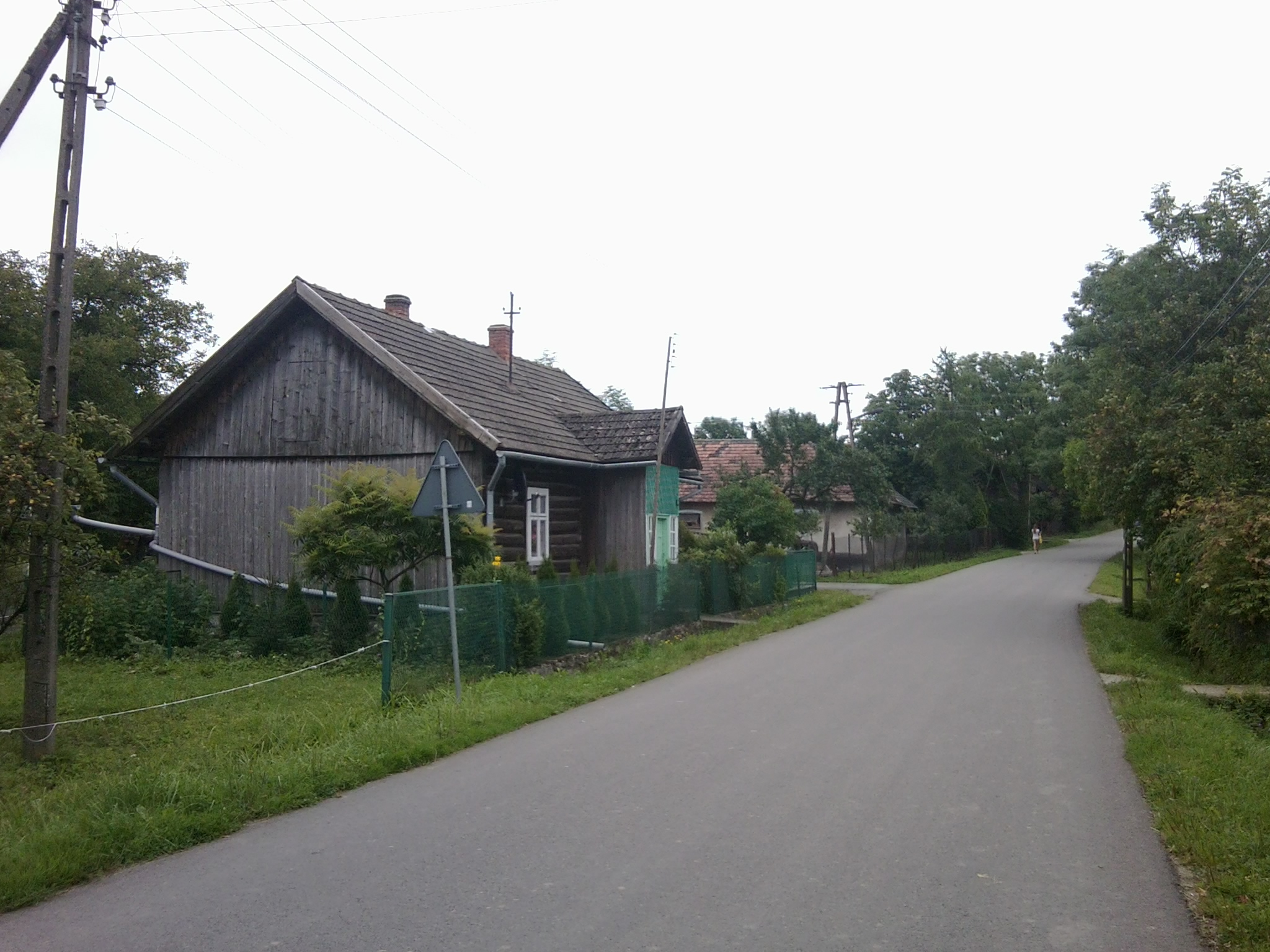

- Location within Poland
- Coordinates: 49°35′57″N 20°33′28″E
- Country: Poland
- Voivodeship: Lesser Poland
- County: Nowy Sącz
- Gmina: Podegrodzie

Mokra Wieś [ˈmɔkra ˈvʲɛɕ] is a village in the administrative district of Gmina Podegrodzie, within Nowy Sącz County, Lesser Poland Voivodeship, in southern Poland.
