= Stanislaus Papczyński =

Polish Catholic priest

Saint Stanislaus Papczyński M.I.C.
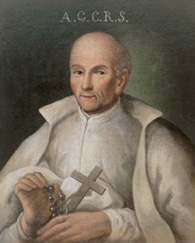
- Born: 18 May 1631; Podegrodzie, Polish–Lithuanian Commonwealth
- Died: 17 September 1701 (aged 70); Góra Kalwaria, Polish–Lithuanian Commonwealth
- Venerated in: Catholic Church
- Beatified: 16 September 2007, Basilica of Our Lady of Licheń, Poland by Cardinal Tarcisio Bertone
- Canonized: 5 June 2016, Saint Peter's Square, Vatican City by Pope Francis
- Major shrine: Church of the Cenacle, Poland
- Feast: 17 September
- Attributes: White habit; Crucifix; Chaplet of the Ten Virtues of the B.V.M.
- Patronage: Marian Fathers; Filii Minimi Cordis Dulcissime-Detroit, USA Unborn children; Children with learning difficulties

Stanislaus Papczyński, MIC (18 May 1631 – 17 September 1701), born Jan Papczyński and in religion Stanislaus of Jesus and Mary, was a Polish Catholic priest who founded the Marians of the Immaculate Conception, the first Polish religious order for men. He is also widely remembered as a prolific religious writer, including works such as The Mystical Temple of God.

He was beatified on 16 September 2007 in Poland by Cardinal Tarcisio Bertone on the behalf of Pope Benedict XVI. Pope Francis approved a miracle attributed to him on 21 January 2016, which allowed him to be canonized. On 15 March 2016 a consistory of cardinals scheduled his canonization to take place on 5 June 2016. It was celebrated in Saint Peter's Square.

== Life ==
=== Early life ===
Jan (John) Papczyński was born on 18 May 1631, in the village of Podegrodzie – now near Stary Sącz – as the youngest of the eight children of Tomasz (Thomas) Papczyński and Zofia (Sophia) Tacikowska. His father was a local blacksmith and also served as the village bailiff. As a youngster, he cared for his father's herd of sheep and came to know the countryside well.

=== Education ===
Stanislaus' early experiences in school did not foreshadow his future career as an academic. He had difficulty with studies, nevertheless he mastered his temperament, overcame material problems associated with his social standing, and advanced in studies, graduating from one school to another: in Podegrodzie, then in Nowy Sącz. At the age of fifteen he entered the Jesuit College at Jarosław, the Piarist College of Podoliniec (now Podolínec, Slovakia) in 1649, and in 1650 the Jesuit College of Lwów (now Lviv, Ukraine), from which he was forced to flee due to an attack by Cossack troops. At the age of twenty-three he completed his general and philosophical studies at the Jesuit College of Rawa Mazowiecka.

He is described as a tall, slender young man, with a swarthy complexion, tall forehead and deep, pensive eyes gazing from under his eyebrows. His father died while Jan was studying in Lwów.

=== Piarist ===
On 2 July 1654, Papczyński joined the Piarist Order, newly established in Poland, in their monastery in Podoliniec and was given the religious name of "Stanislaus of Jesus and Mary". He performed the lowliest tasks, cleaning out stables and barns, chopping wood, and washing dishes. He made his second year of novitiate in Warsaw, while studying theology with the Recollect Franciscan friars. Those were the times of the Swedish invasion known as "the Deluge", that made a deep impression on the young seminarian's life. From the perspective of his whole life's experience, he thus described in his testimony one incident from those days: "I confess," he writes, "that I leave this world professing the Catholic faith for which I was ready to pour out my blood during the war with Sweden. One day my companion and I were exiting the Old Town, when a heretic soldier, his unsheathed sword in hand, attacked us near the Dominican Fathers. My companion (even though he was German) fled, and I, falling to my knees, stuck out my neck for the blow. However, by the decree of Divine Providence, I did not sustain any wounds although I was struck three times with great force. Afterward, I felt great pains for an hour and a half because of that."

On 22 July 1656, Papka made his profession of religious vows as the first Polish member of the Piarist Congregation. He was ordained to the priesthood on 12 March 1661.

While still a seminarian, Papczyński taught rhetoric in the Piarist colleges of Rzeszów and Podoliniec, and then after ordination he taught in a Warsaw college. He wrote a textbook entitled "Prodromus reginae artium" (The Messenger of the Queen of Arts), and used it in his lectures. This textbook underwent four reprints during subsequent years. This work merited special praise for its pedagogical character as well as the selection of rhetoric which witnesses to the author's patriotic sentiments and his special devotion to the Virgin Mary. Also, in this textbook he postulated the equality of all citizens before the law and took a critical stand on the Sejm's liberum veto rule (the right to freely veto, without needing to give a reason).

As a priest Papczyński heard confessions and gave sermons. On greater feasts he was invited to preach in the many churches of the capital. One sermon he preached on Thomas Aquinas, delivered at the Dominican church, was published in 1664 under the title Doctor Angelicus (The Angelic Doctor). Taking advantage of Papczyński's contacts with influential people, his superiors entrusted him with gathering petitions for the beatification of the Order's founder, Joseph Calasanz. Papczyński obtained many letters. From 1663 to 1667 he directed the Confraternity of Our Lady of Grace, Patroness of Warsaw, whose image was in the Piarist's Church on Długa Street.

One of his penitents was the Apostolic Nuncio to Poland, Antonio Pignatelli, the future Pope Innocent XII.

==== Leaving the Piarists ====
Due to differences in understanding of the Order's character, Papczyński's relations with his superiors kept getting more strained and eventually led to his leaving the Order. He strove to restore the early rigor of their way of life, while practices in the province tended to favor laxity. Because of his views and actions, as interpreted by some of his superiors, he was the cause of confusion among Piarists, while he himself felt misunderstood. Later he used to call this period of his life "a long-lasting martyrdom". In those difficult times he wrote two series of meditations: Orator crucifixus (The crucified Speaker) and Christus patiens (The suffering Christ).

Not being able to find for himself, within the Piarists, the proper climate for life and work and at the same time seeing also a rift within the Province between his supporters and adversaries, Papczyński asked the Superior General to release him from his religious vows. On 11 December 1670, he left the Order. In the presence of his Piarist superiors he declared: "I offer and consecrate to God, the Almighty Father, the Son, and the Holy Spirit, as well as to the Mother of God, the ever-Virgin Mary, conceived without sin, my heart, my soul, my body, leaving absolutely nothing for myself, so that henceforth I may be the slave of God Almighty and of the Most Blessed Virgin Mary. Consequently, I vow to serve Them zealously, in chastity, to the end of my life, in the society of Marian Clerics of the Immaculate Conception, which by the grace of God I wish to found".

=== New Marian congregation ===
Papczyński's mission was made more difficult by his being of common birth and advocating a very rigorous lifestyle in the prevalent aristocratic mentality. He found support for his plan from the Bishop of Poznań, Stefan Wierzbowski. Rejecting proposals from different Orders and bishops (those of Kraków and Płock), Papczyński went as a chaplain to Jakub Karski's house in Lubocza near Nowe Miasto-on-Pilica in order to prepare himself for this new undertaking. There, in September 1671, he was vested in a white religious habit in honor of the Immaculate Conception of the Virgin Mary. He also prepared the project of the future Order's statute entitled "Norma vitae" (Rule of Life), which he established as an order of canons regular. At the same time he wrote a moral and ascetical treatise called "Templum Dei Mysticum" (The Mystical Temple of God), which underwent several reprints. In this book he expressed his belief that lay people, and not only priests and religious, are called to holiness.

Seeking candidates for his planned order, in September 1673, Papczyński went to Puszcza Korabiewska near Skierniewice, where a former soldier, Stanislaus Krajewski, and companions lived as hermits. There, on the land donated by Krajewski, he built and organized his Institute's first house, which he called a "Retreat House". Bishop Stanislaus Święcicki, who came on a canonical visitation on 24 October 1673, approved this community living in accord with the "Norma vitae" under Papczyński's guidance. He left them his own "Statutes" on the characteristics of hermits and penitentials. The Marians consider this date as the beginning of their Order.

Bishop of Poznań Wierzbowski wished to engage the newly created religious community in fulfilling of his plans of the renewal of religious life in the diocese. Particularly in the town of Góra (now Góra Kalwaria) near Warsaw where he had established Mazovia's holy city which he called New Jerusalem. There he built many churches and chapels commemorating the Passion of Christ. To serve the arriving pilgrims, he brought over several religious orders, among them Papczyński's community. In 1677, he consigned to him the Church of the Lord's Cenacle with its adjacent monastery. The previous obligations of living a hermits' lifestyle were not in force at this institution. Papczyński lived here until his death, 24 years later.

On 21 April 1679, Wierzbowski canonically constituted Stanislaus's institute, composed of two houses, as an Order of diocesan right. The stated goal of the community was to spread devotion to the Virgin Mary, and to assist poor souls in purgatory, particularly those who died in fields of battle and victims of plagues. Papczyński also directed his spiritual sons to undertake pastoral works, especially assisting pastors by hearing confessions, as well as catechizing and delivering sermons to the faithful, particularly the most spiritually neglected in regards to religion. Papczyński introduced abstinence from drinking vodka in the order. King John III Sobieski, who was known for his kindness towards strict religious orders, took the Marians under his special protection.

However, the simple vows which the Marians were making at the time were not strongly binding, and the fate of the Congregation depended simply on the bishop. This problem became particularly apparent after the death of Bishop Wierzbowski in 1687. For these reasons Papczyński, who was already 60 years old, set out on a journey by foot to Rome in 1690, in order to obtain papal approval for his Order. Unfortunately, he arrived there at a time when the Holy See was without a pope, and only procured a spiritual affiliation of the Marians with several other Orders. The approbation of "Norma vitae" as the Congregation's statutes, which took place a couple of years later, was a fruit of this journey.

In 1699, Papczyński made another attempt to procure the approbation of his order, by sending to Rome Joachim Kozlowski as his envoy with full powers (plenipotentiary). Meeting with difficulties in obtaining the approbation of the Marian Order upon its own rule, Kozlowski approached the reformed Franciscan Minors for the "Rule of the Ten Virtues of the Blessed Virgin Mary", which included the Marians' legal dependence on this Order. Pope Innocent XII approved the document issued by the General of Franciscans on 24 October 1699. Although the Rule was received without previous consultation with Papczyński, it did not infringe the specific features of the Marian Institute and was thus gladly accepted by the Marian Legislator. The Marians became an order with solemn vows and were freed from the authority of a local bishop, although they were dependent on the Franciscans for some time. Finally, the Marians received approbation as an order of apostolic right ridding themselves of restrictions. In their apostolic work they placed special emphasis on teaching truths of the faith to the faithful of lower classes, which the church considered was its most urgent task at the time.

On 6 June 1701, Papczyński pronounced a solemn profession of vows in the hands of the Apostolic Nuncio, Francesco Pignatelli, and then received the profession of vows from the other Marians, a very important milestone in establishing the first Polish religious order for men. On the way to the realization of this goal, for a duration of 30 years, Papczyński had to overcome innumerable difficulties. A few times he doubted whether or not God truly wanted him to follow this road.

=== Death and burial ===
He died on 17 September 1701, and was buried at the Church of the Lord's Cenacle in Góra Kalwaria.

== Spirituality ==
At school, from the pulpit, in the confessional, or at his desk, Papczyński proclaimed the word of God everywhere in speech and writing, emphasizing particularly the need to care for those wronged by the society. His work followed the beliefs proclaimed in "Templum Dei Mysticum": "O how admirable are those who mutually work with Christ, and, solely out of love for Him, sincerely and zealously announce all that is essential for salvation, for leading a Christian life, for rooting out vices, and increasing virtues. This is the greatest and most fruitful work of mercy".

Two centuries before the proclamation of the Dogma of the Immaculate Conception Stanislaus professed: "I believe everything that the holy Roman Church believes, but first of all I profess that the Most Holy Mother of God, Mary, was conceived without any stain of original sin". This privilege of the Immaculate Conception was very precious to him. He talked about it in sermons and wrote extensively on the subject. In 1670 he made a "vow of blood" witnessing his readiness to lay down his life if necessary in honor of Mary's Immaculate Conception. Papczyński lived in times illustrated by the Polish writer Henryk Sienkiewicz in his "Trilogy", describing the Cossack wars, the Swedish invasion of Poland, and finally, the Polish army's victory at Vienna. He himself accompanied Polish troops in battles against Turks in Ukraine in 1674, and witnessed that many people died unshriven.

== Sainthood ==
=== Process and Venerable ===
A cause to beatify Papczyński was started in 1767, interrupted in 1775, and reopened in 1953. His spiritual writings were approved by theologians on 22 July 1775. But because such a long time had passed since his death, this process had to be accomplished "historically", which means that documents had to be searched for testimonies on one's life and virtues. Those documents were prepared and gathered in a 1000-page manuscript called "Positio". On 28 February 1980, the National Conference of Bishops in Poland petitioned the Pope to elevate Papczyński to the altars as a model of Christian life. Based on this evidence, on 28 November 1980, the Congregation for Saints made a decision that Papczyński's beatification cause may be brought before the Apostolic Tribunal.

Pope John Paul II approved this decision on 6 March 1981 which commenced sainthood proceedings and granted him the title Servant of God – the first stage in the process.

In the years 1981–1982, a process de non cultu was conducted in Warsaw. The decree super validitate Processus (regarding the validity of the diocesan process) was promulgated in 1990. Further evaluations of Positio super Virtutibus were also conducted. Then, on 22 January 1991, during an Ordinary Congress of the Congregation, chaired by Anthony Petti, General Promoter of the Faith, the theological consultants stated that Papczyński had practiced virtues to a heroic degree.

On 17 March 1992, after having listened to the report delivered by Paulino Limongi, Titular Archbishop of Nice in Hemimont, the cardinals and bishops gathered at an Ordinary Congregation stated that he had practiced the theological virtues, the cardinal virtues, and other virtues associated with these, to a heroic degree.

After the results of the research conducted by the Cardinal-Prefect, Cardinal Angelo Felici, had been presented to the pope, he accepted the decision of the Sacred Congregation for the Causes of the Saints and ordered that the decree on Papczyński's heroic virtues be prepared.

On 13 June 1992, the Pope invited the Cardinal-Prefect, the relators of the cause, the Secretary of the congregation, and other people who are usually summoned in such circumstances and, in the presence of all gathered with regard to the cause and its result, solemnly announced that:

It is considered to be a certain thing that Blessed Stanislaus of Jesus and Mary Papczyński practiced the theological virtues of faith, hope, and charity, the cardinal virtues of prudence, justice, temperance, and fortitude, and other virtues associated with these, to a heroic degree. The Pope ordered that this decree be made public and kept in the acts of the Sacred Congregation for the Causes of Saints.

=== Beatification ===
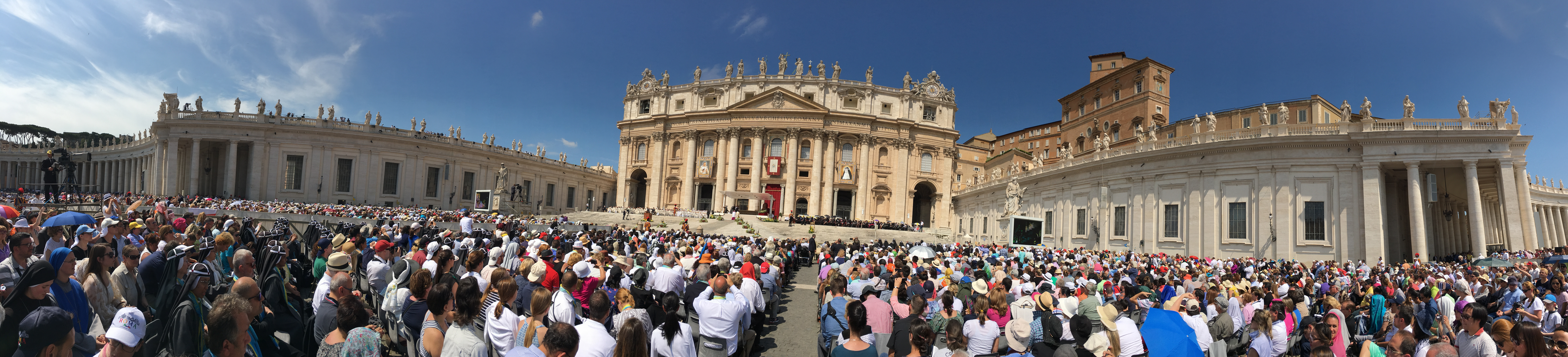
Canonization Mass celebrated on 5 June 2016.

The miracle needed for his beatification was investigated in the 2003–2004 timeframe and received formal validation from the Sacred Congregation for the Causes of Saints on 7 May 2004. A medical board based in Rome met and approved the miracle on 12 May 2005 while theologians followed suit and approved it also on 20 September 2005. The cardinal and bishop members of the Sacred Congregation for the Causes of Saints granted their formal approval on 3 October 2006, while Pope Benedict XVI approved it on 16 December 2006.

The miracle in question concerned Urszula Markowska on 4 April 2000.

He was beatified at the Marian Shrine in Licheń by a special delegate of Pope Benedict XVI – Cardinal Tarcisio Bertone, Secretary of State of the Holy See on 16 September 2007.

=== Canonization ===
The second miracle required for his canonization was investigated in a diocesan tribunal and was ratified as being a valid process on 27 June 2014. The Rome-based medical board met and approved it on 17 September 2015 while the theologians also met and approved it on 10 November 2015. The cardinal and bishops who constituted the Sacred Congregation for the Causes of Saints also approved it on 12 January 2016.

Pope Francis approved the miracle on 21 January 2016; a date was determined for the canonization at a consistory of cardinals on the following 15 March and he was canonized as a saint on 5 June 2016.

=== Feast days ===
- 18 May – Memorial of Saint Stanislaus (Birthday)
- 17 September – Solemnity of Divine Providence (Death anniversary)

== From the last will and testament of Stanislaus Papczyński ==
"I give thanks to the Divine Majesty for graces, gifts, and goodness granted me with great generosity. I repent from the depth of my heart and I wish out of love of the Lord to repent more and more for all my sins, which I place in the deepest wounds of Jesus Christ, my Lord and Redeemer. I fall at the feet of Blessed Virgin Mary, Mother of God, and I give myself with the entire Congregation of her Immaculate Conception to her for eternity. I call on her gracious direction and effective care, and for the hour of my death I beg her most merciful and powerful protection from the ambushes of my enemies and all temporal and eternal Evil.

To all those who loved and supported the Congregation of the Immaculate Conception (which I founded through God’s inspiration to support all the faithful departed), I promise double reward from God’s hand.

I eagerly suggest to my brethren, if it be appropriate for me to say: Sons, you ought to have love for God and neighbor, devotion to the Catholic faith, and worship, love, and obedience to the Holy See, faithful preservation of the vows, humility, patience, support the souls in purgatory, and be at peace with everyone."
