= Prusie =

- Village
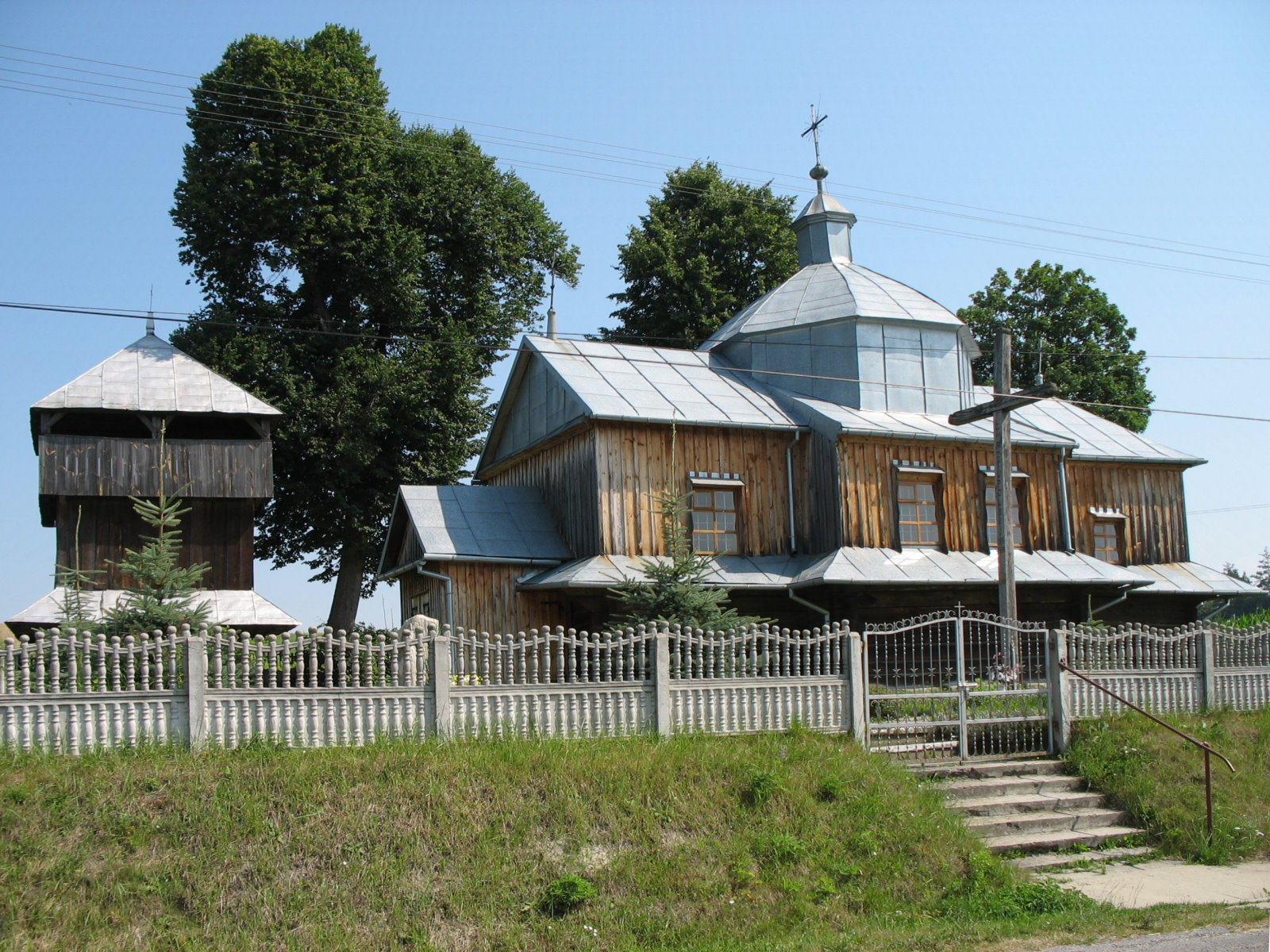
- Greek Catholic church

- Location within Poland
- Coordinates: 50°15′N 23°32′E
- Country: Poland
- Voivodeship: Subcarpathian
- County: Lubaczów
- Gmina: Horyniec-Zdrój
- Population: 110

Prusie [ˈpruɕɛ] is a village in the administrative district of Gmina Horyniec-Zdrój, within Lubaczów County, Subcarpathian Voivodeship, in south-eastern Poland, close to the border with Ukraine.
