= Brzezna =

- Village
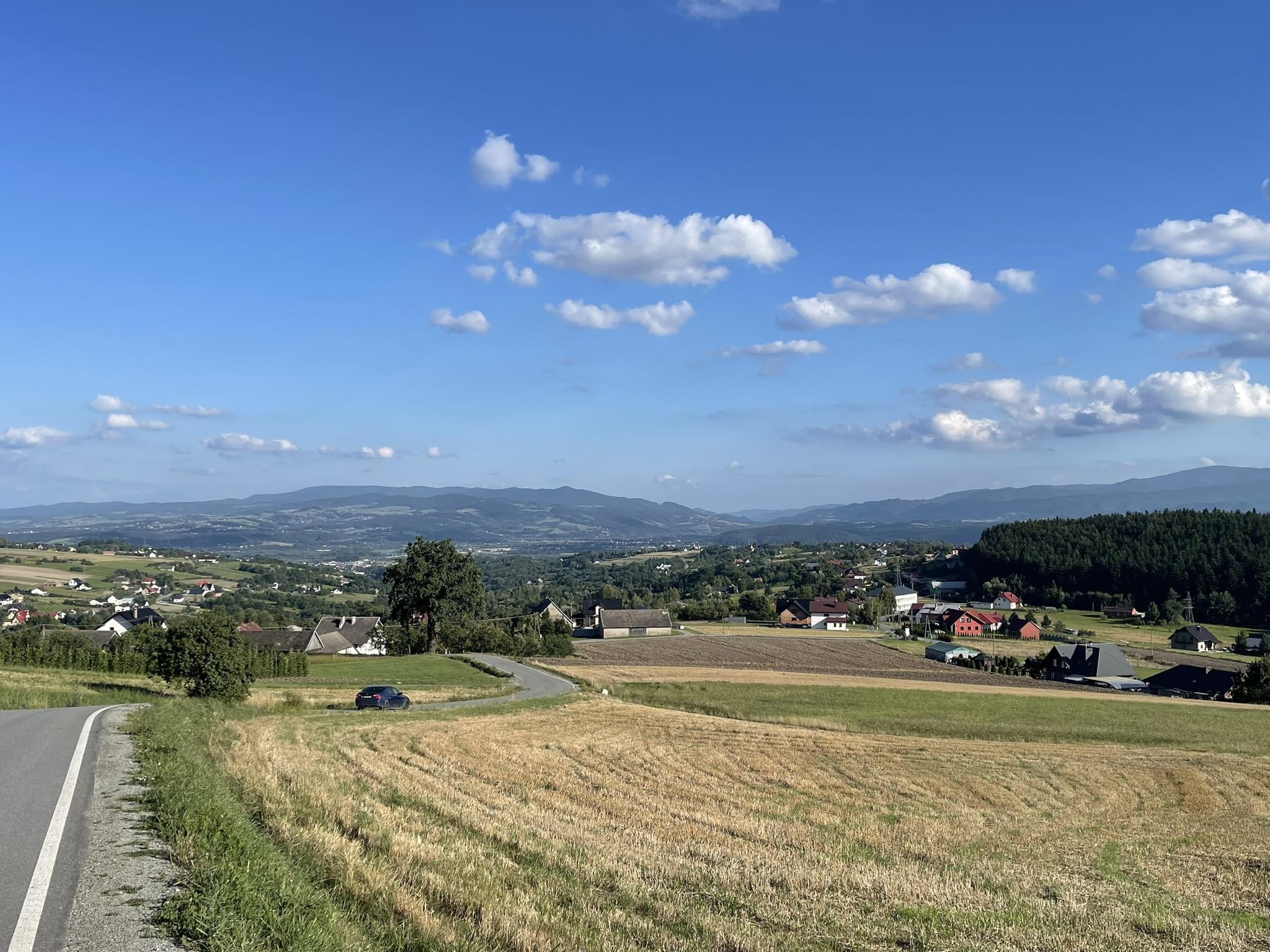

- Location within Poland
- Coordinates: 49°36′12″N 20°36′52″E
- Country: Poland
- Voivodeship: Lesser Poland
- County: Nowy Sącz
- Gmina: Podegrodzie
- Population: 2,000

Brzezna [ˈbʐɛzna] is a village in the administrative district of Gmina Podegrodzie, within Nowy Sącz County, Lesser Poland Voivodeship, in southern Poland.
