= Bruckenthal =

Former village in Lviv Oblast, Ukraine

- Village
- Interactive map of Bruckenthal
- Coordinates: 50°19′34″N 23°52′42.9″E
- Country: Ukraine
- Oblast: Lviv Oblast
- Raion: Sheptytskyi Raion
- Established: 1786

Bruckenthal (Ukrainian: Брукенталь, romanized: Brukental) was a village (a colony) located in what is now Sheptytskyi Raion, Lviv Oblast, in Western Ukraine.

The village was established during the Josephine colonization by German Catholic settlers in 1786.

In the interwar period the village belonged to Poland, and was the seat of a gmina (a municipality) including several other villages. In January 1940 the majority of the inhabitants moved out (Heim ins Reich). The empty houses were taken over mostly by local Poles. In late March 1944, the village was razed by Ukrainian Auxiliary Police and Ukrainian Insurgent Army, killing over 200 people.

== Refugees ==
From the early 1910s, regional unrest led to numerous residents leaving for Germany and America, often to the upper American Midwest, joining other Germans from Russia in the "German Triangle" of the central Dakotas. Others were not so lucky, and ended up as refugees during WWII. Afterwards, letters and money were sent between relatives on the west and eastern side of the iron curtain, but by the 1970s communication ceased, possibly due to Russian integration of cultural Germans.
