= Podrzecze, Lesser Poland Voivodeship =

Podrzecze
- Village
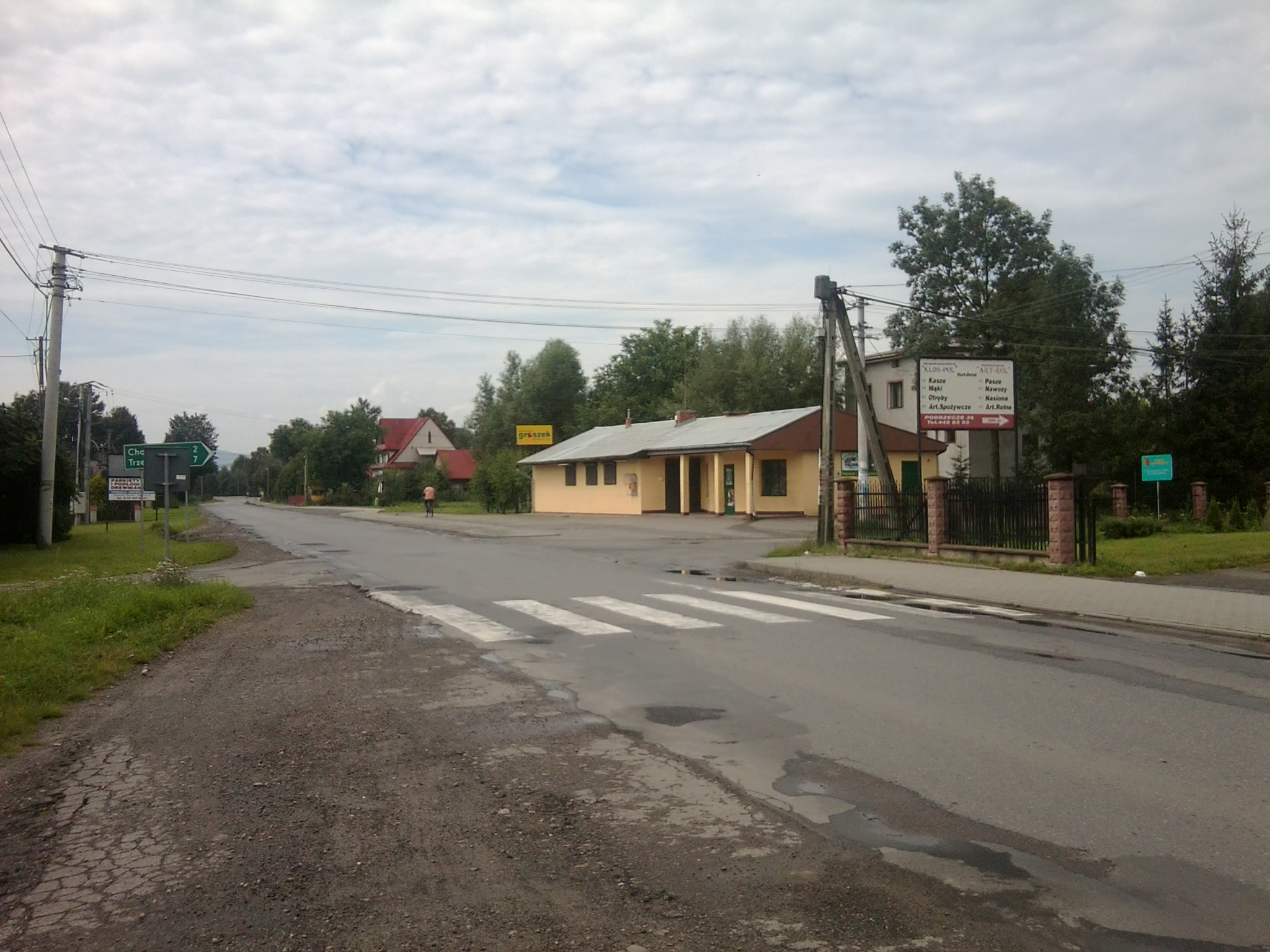

- Location within Poland
- Coordinates: 49°36′N 20°39′E
- Country: Poland
- Voivodeship: Lesser Poland
- County: Nowy Sącz
- Gmina: Podegrodzie

Podrzecze [pɔˈdʐɛt͡ʂɛ] is a village in the administrative district of Gmina Podegrodzie, within Nowy Sącz County, Lesser Poland Voivodeship, in southern Poland.
