= Wólka Horyniecka =

- Village
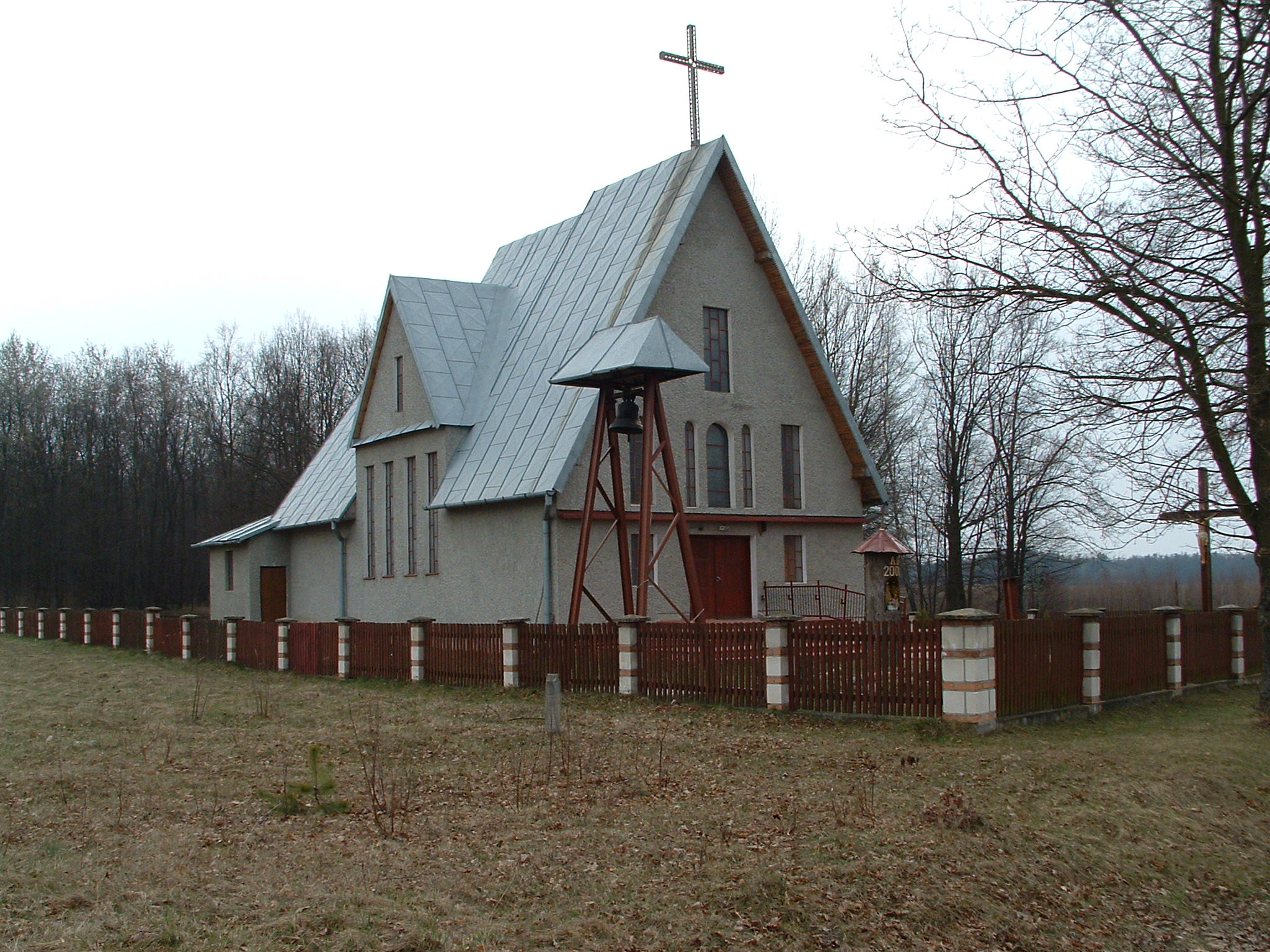
- Church in Wólka Horyniecka

- Location within Poland
- Coordinates: 50°10′N 23°19′E
- Country: Poland
- Voivodeship: Subcarpathian
- County: Lubaczów
- Gmina: Horyniec-Zdrój

Wólka Horyniecka [ˈvulka xɔrɨˈɲɛt͡ska] is a village in the administrative district of Gmina Horyniec-Zdrój, within Lubaczów County, Subcarpathian Voivodeship, in south-eastern Poland, close to the border with Ukraine.
