= Zelenyi Yar =

Rural locality in Ivano-Frankivsk Oblast, Ukraine

Zelenyi Yar Зелений Яр
- Village
- Location within Ivano-Frankivsk Oblast Location within Ukraine
- Coordinates: 48°56′26″N 24°18′21″E
- Country: Ukraine
- Oblast: Ivano-Frankivsk
- Raion: Kalush
- Area: 8.77 km^{2} (3.39 sq mi)
- Population: 176
  - Density: 20.1/km^{2} (52.0/sq mi)

Zelenyi Yar (Ukrainian: Зелений Яр, German: Landestreu) is a village (selo) in Kalush Raion, Ivano-Frankivsk Oblast, in west Ukraine. It belongs to Novytsia rural hromada, one of the hromadas of Ukraine.

The village was established in the course of Josephine colonization by Lutheran settlers in 1783. In 1789 it had 42 families. The local filial Lutheran church belonged to the parish of Ugartsthal. In the late 1930s the name was changed to Mazurówka.

In January 1940 the local German population was moved out (Heim ins Reich), later replaced by Ukrainians.
