= Josephine colonization =

Colonization of Galicia by Joseph II of Austria

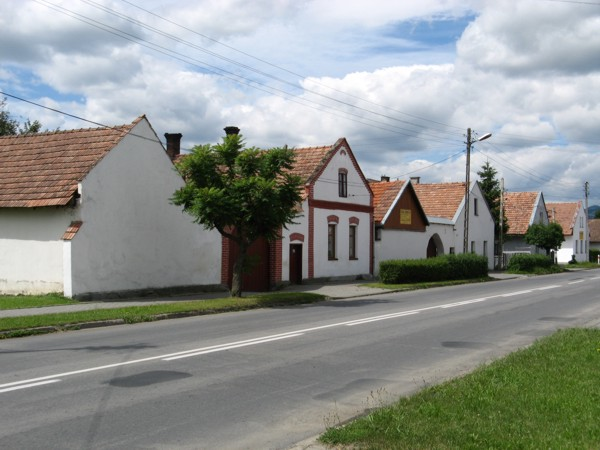
Colonists' buildings in Gołkowice Dolne, southern Poland

The Josephine colonization (German: Josephinische Kolonisation or Josephinische Besiedlung, Polish: kolonizacja józefińska) was a state-funded settlement campaign organised under the rule of Joseph II in the 1780s, in the then-new crownland of the Austrian Empire, Galicia, and to a lesser extent, in Bukovina. The colonization reinforced the societies of Galician and Bukovina Germans.

== History ==
Austrian Empire endeavored to colonize, in a similar manner, lands wrestled from the Ottoman Empire during the 18th century, giving birth to, among others, the society of Danube Swabians. The first ethnically German and Protestant settlement on the territory that would later become Galicia emerged in the middle of the 18th century in Zalishchyky. Two years after the First Partition of Poland, namely in September 1774, Maria Theresa issued a patent allowing settlement of non-Protestant artisans and traders in Lemberg, Jarosław, Zamość (which was lost to Russia in 1809) and Zalishchyky. However, it was not followed by a meaningful influx of migrants.

After the death of Maria Theresa, Joseph II issued on August 17, 1781, a patent, whose aim was to commence a settlement campaign imitating the one done by Frederick the Great of Prussia. In comparison to the previous patent it also facilitated the arrival of rural settlers, and later, by a supplementary patent issued on November 11, Protestants. The land given to the settlers was mainly that of confiscated from folwarks of the former Polish crown lands and fields belonging to liquidated monasteries. The new settlements were often founded adjacent to existing villages, with a separate arrangement of plots.

The greatest influx of colonists arrived in the years 1783–1784. The campaign was closed in 1789, but the settlers were not forbidden to establish daughter settlements afterwards. Roughly 14,400 people (over 3,200 families) settled in Galicia. In total over 170 settlmenents (called colonies) were established, of which 120 were purely German, 55 were mixed, 127 were funded directly by the state, whereas the rest were private. Most of them were located in eastern Galicia. The town of Podgórze was also established in that time. The settlements inhabited by at least 20 families created separate municipalities. Among the settlers, whose origins are known, over one third arrived from the Palatinate. The settlements were grouped as much as possible according to denomination. 47% were Lutherans, 13% Calvinists, less than 1% were Mennonites, who were since 1790 treated against their will as Lutherans, but eventually established their own parish in 1909. Lutherans and Calvinists were allowed to establish parishes according to the Patent of Toleration. Catholics, accounting 39% of the settlers, did not initially build any new churches (although they were planned in Königsau, Kaisersdorf and Wiesenberg), but joined the already existing ones in the nearest villages. There were also attempts to settle Jewish (local) population, but their settlements did not survive long. Additionally 750 Polish families were similarly settled around Sandomierz, but on worse fields.

The whole settlement campaign cost around 3,000,000 florins, over 900 florins per family. The colonization did not meet the expectations of its initiators, who planned to lure mostly wealthy professionals and artisans, but instead the migrants were largely farmers, dependent on state assistance.

== Examples of colonies ==
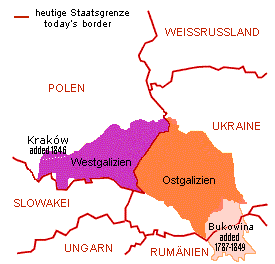
Western and Eastern Galicia superimposed with modern borders

=== Western Galicia ===
The colonies of the Western Galicia were located in three concentrated areas, around Nowy Sącz (Stary Sącz crown lands), around Bochnia (Niepołomice crown lands), and the third in the fork of the rivers Vistula and San (crown lands of Sandomierz and Leżajsk).

- Deutsch Golkowitz, now Gołkowice Dolne
- Hohenbach, now part of Czermin
- Reisheim or Reichsheim, now Sarnów
- Stadlau, now Stadła

=== Eastern Galicia ===
- Bruckenthal
- Deutschbach, now Polanka Horyniecka (Poland)
- Dornfeld, now Ternopillia
- Kaiserdorf, now Kalyniv
- Königsau, now Rivne
- Landestreu, now Zelenyi Yar
- Josefsberg, now Korosnytsia
- Neudorf, now Nove Selo
- Reichau, now Podlesie (Poland)
- Rosenburg, now Rozheve
- Siegenthal
- Ugartsberg, now Vypuchki
- Ugartsthal

=== Bukovina ===
Bukovina was colonized in much smaller scale between years 1782 and 1787. Around 75 families settled in 9 colonies:

- Fratautz, now Frătăuţii, 16 families;
- Illischestie, now Ilişeşti, 12 families;
- Satulmare, now Satu Mare, 8 families;
- Milleschoutz, now Milișăuți, 8 families;
- Badeutz, now Bădeuți, 8 families;
- Itzkany, now Ițcani, 8 families;
- St. Onufry, west of Siret, 8 families;
- Tereblestie, now Terebleche in Chernivtsi Oblast of Ukraine, 7 families;
- Arbora, now Arbore, 7 families;

== See also ==
- Ostsiedlung
- Heim ins Reich

== Bibliography ==
- Lepucki, Henryk (1938). Działalność kolonizacyjna Marii Teresy i Józefa II w Galicji 1772-1790 : z 9 tablicami i mapą (in Polish). Lwów: Kasa im. J. Mianowskiego.
- Schneider, Ludwing (1939). Das Kolonisationswerk Josefs II. in Galizien (in German). Poznań.
- Irmgard Hein Ellingson. "Galicia: A Multi-Ethnic Overview and Settlement History with Special Reference to Bukovina" (PDF). FEEFHS Journal. Archived from the original (PDF) on April 6, 2009.
