= Nowe Brusno =

- Village
- Location within Poland
- Coordinates: 50°14′N 23°18′E
- Country: Poland
- Voivodeship: Subcarpathian
- County: Lubaczów
- Gmina: Horyniec-Zdrój

Nowe Brusno [ˈnɔvɛ ˈbrusnɔ] is a village in the administrative district of Gmina Horyniec-Zdrój, within Lubaczów County, Subcarpathian Voivodeship, in south-eastern Poland, where it is close to the border with Ukraine.
