= Rogi, Lesser Poland Voivodeship =

Rogi
- Village
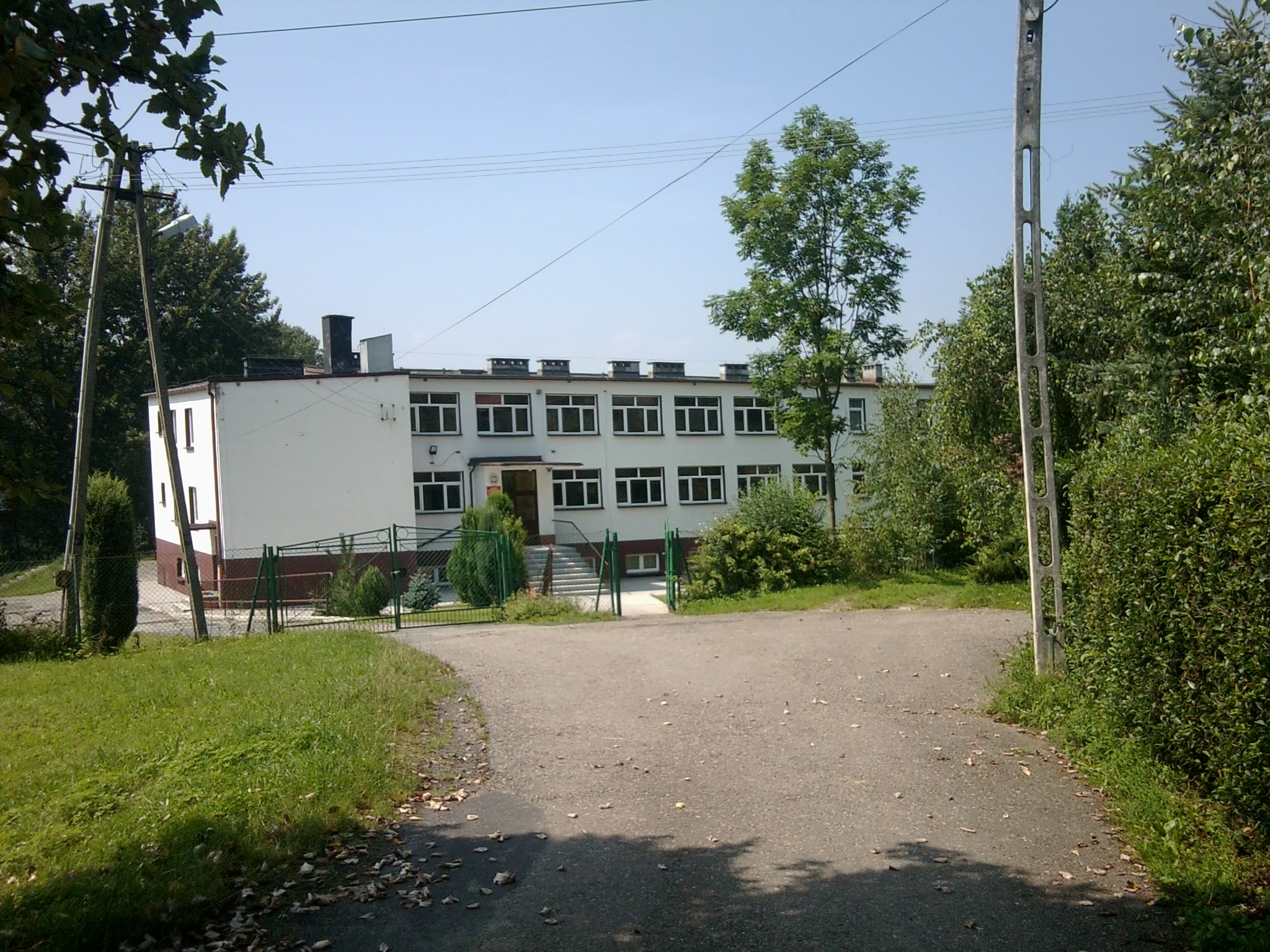
- A primary school in Rogi

- Location within Poland
- Coordinates: 49°34′55″N 20°32′52″E
- Country: Poland
- Voivodeship: Lesser Poland
- County: Nowy Sącz
- Gmina: Podegrodzie

Rogi [ˈrɔɡʲi] is a village in the administrative district of Gmina Podegrodzie, within Nowy Sącz County, Lesser Poland Voivodeship, in southern Poland.

It is the birthplace of Polish artist Ludwik Lizoń.
