= Długołęka-Świerkla =

- Village
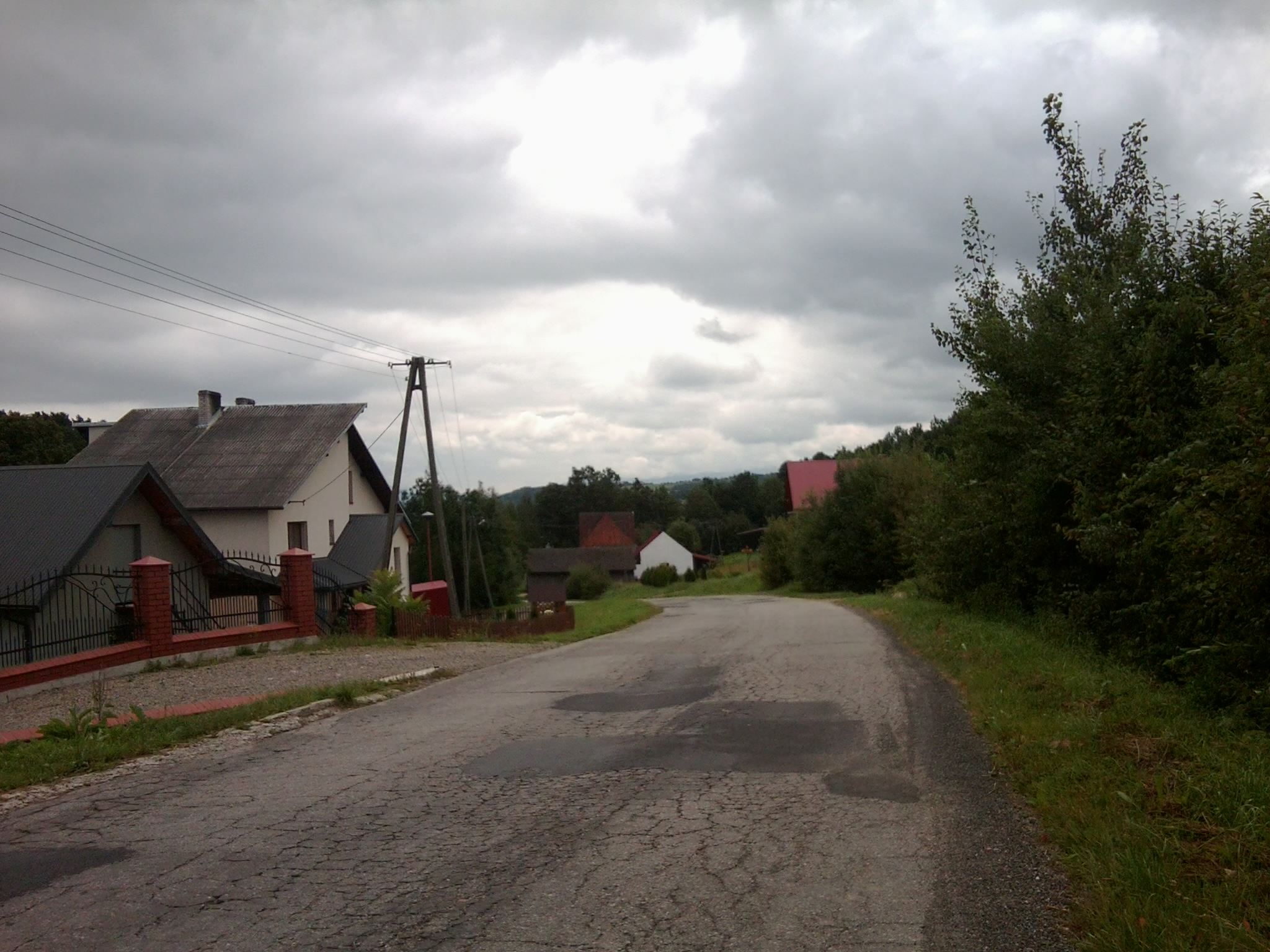
- Houses by the road in Długołęka-Świerkla

- Location within Poland
- Coordinates: 49°37′39″N 20°32′46″E
- Country: Poland
- Voivodeship: Lesser Poland
- County: Nowy Sącz
- Gmina: Podegrodzie
- Population: 1,700

Długołęka-Świerkla (Polish pronunciation: [dwuɡɔˈwɛŋka ˈɕfjɛrkla]) is a village in the administrative district of Gmina Podegrodzie, within Nowy Sącz County, Lesser Poland Voivodeship, in southern Poland.
