= Podegrodzie, Lesser Poland Voivodeship =

Podegrodzie
- Village
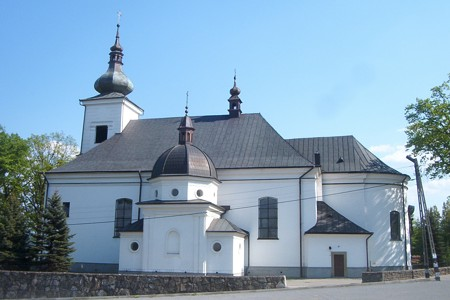
- Saint Jacob Church

- Location within Poland
- Coordinates: 49°34′N 20°35′E
- Country: Poland
- Voivodeship: Lesser Poland
- County: Nowy Sącz
- Gmina: Podegrodzie
- Elevation: 306 m (1,004 ft)
- Population: 1,700
- Website: http://www.podegrodzie.pl/

Podegrodzie [pɔdɛˈɡrɔd͡ʑɛ] is a village in Nowy Sącz County, Lesser Poland Voivodeship, in southern Poland. It is the seat of the gmina (administrative district) called Gmina Podegrodzie.

Podegrodzie is the seat of one of the oldest Roman Catholic parishes in historic Lesser Poland. It was probably established here in 1014 by Boleslaw Chrobry, because in the early Middle Ages, two fortified gord existed in this area: Zamczysko and Grobla. Furthermore, Podegrodzie is one of the centers of an ethnic group Lachy Sadeckie. Here, the Museum of Lachy Sadeckie is located.

The village owes its name to the location. Podegrodzie in loose translation means "a settlement under the gord", as it was located at the two castellan residencies, the gords of Grobla and Zamczysko. It was first mentioned in documents from the late 13th century, and Jan Długosz wrote its name in two ways: Podgrodzye and Podgrodze. In 1538 it was spelled Podegrodze, and in 1581 – Podgrodzie.

In the late 10th century, when southern Lesser Poland became part of the Kingdom of Poland, the seat of the Castellan was a gord at Naszczowice. After it had burned, the castellans moved their residence to the Zamczysko gord, which also burned after some time. Next residence was the gord of Grobla, located on a hill several hundred meters southwards. The village of Podegrodzie was established between the two gords. In 1241, Podegrodzie and Grobla were destroyed during the Mongol invasion of Poland. As a result, the town of Stary Sącz was founded in 1278, replacing Grobla as main administrative center of the region.

Saint Stanislaus Papczyński was born in this village in 1631.
