= Gmina Horyniec-Zdrój =

Gmina Horyniec-Zdrój Horyniec-Zdrój Commune
- Gmina
- Coat of arms
- Interactive map of Gmina Horyniec-Zdrój
- Coordinates (Horyniec-Zdrój): 50°11′26″N 23°21′43″E
- Country: Poland
- Voivodeship: Subcarpathian
- County: Lubaczów
- Seat: Horyniec-Zdrój

Area
  - Total: 202.78 km^{2} (78.29 sq mi)

Population (2013)
  - Total: 4,931
  - Density: 24.32/km^{2} (62.98/sq mi)
- Website: http://www.horyniec-zdroj.pl/

Gmina Horyniec-Zdrój is a rural gmina (administrative district) in Lubaczów County, Subcarpathian Voivodeship, in south-eastern Poland, on the border with Ukraine. Its seat is the village of Horyniec-Zdrój, which lies approximately 18 kilometres (11 mi) east of Lubaczów and 99 km (62 mi) east of the regional capital Rzeszów.

The gmina covers an area of 202.78 square kilometres (78.3 sq mi), and as of 2006 its total population is 4,887.

== Villages ==
Gmina Horyniec-Zdrój contains the villages and settlements of Dziewięcierz, Horyniec-Zdrój, Krzywe, Mrzygłody Lubyckie, Nowe Brusno, Nowiny Horynieckie, Podemszczyzna, Polanka Horyniecka, Prusie, Radruż, Werchrata and Wólka Horyniecka.

== Neighbouring gminas ==
Gmina Horyniec-Zdrój is bordered by the gminas of Cieszanów, Lubaczów, Lubycza Królewska and Narol. It also borders Ukraine.
