= Juraszowa =

- Village
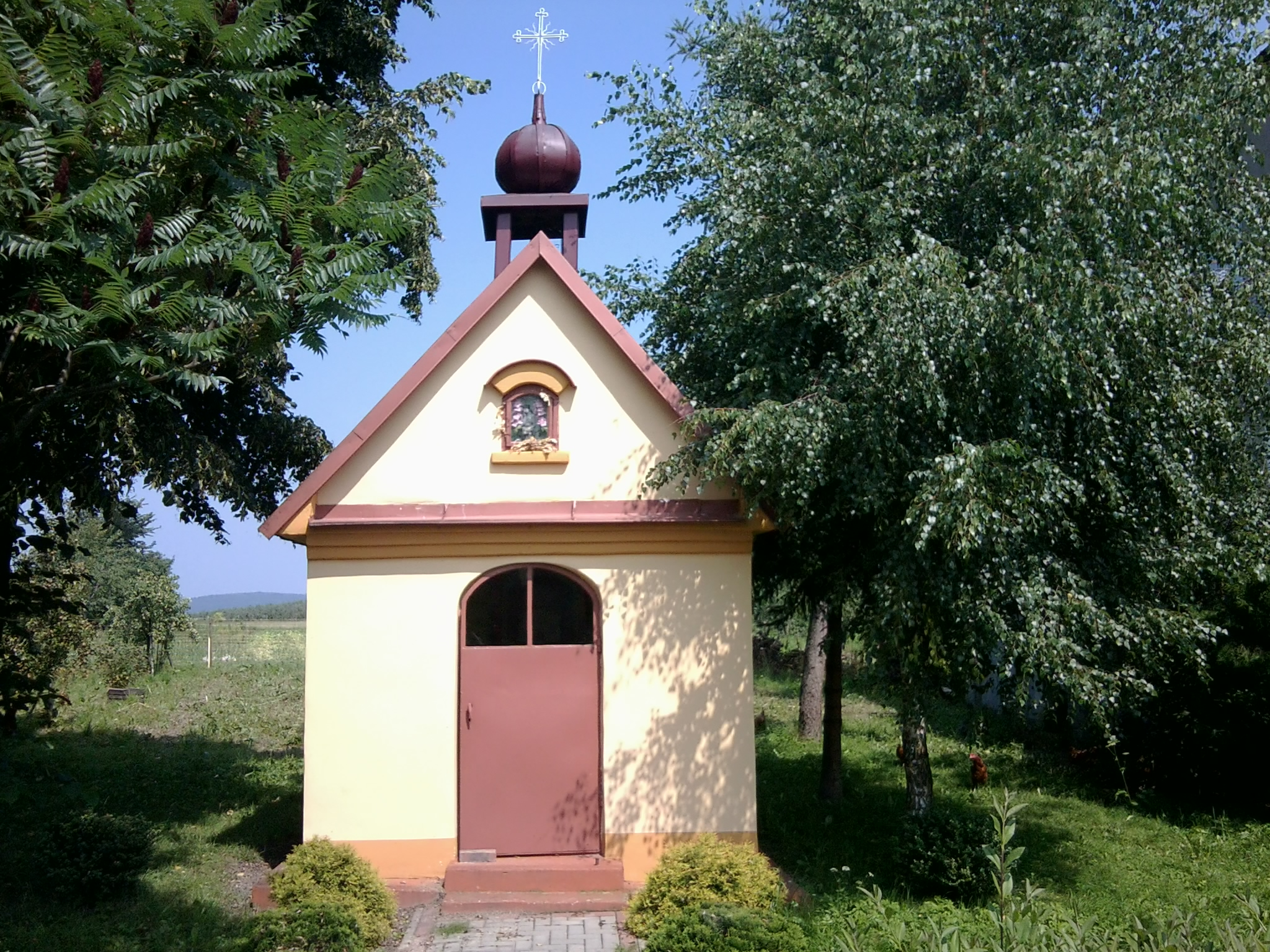
- Chapel

- Location within Poland
- Coordinates: 49°34′N 20°34′E
- Country: Poland
- Voivodeship: Lesser Poland
- County: Nowy Sącz
- Gmina: Podegrodzie

Juraszowa [juraˈʂɔva] is a village in the administrative district of Gmina Podegrodzie, within Nowy Sącz County, Lesser Poland Voivodeship, in southern Poland.
