= Gmina Podegrodzie =

Gmina Podegrodzie Podegrodzie Commune
- Gmina
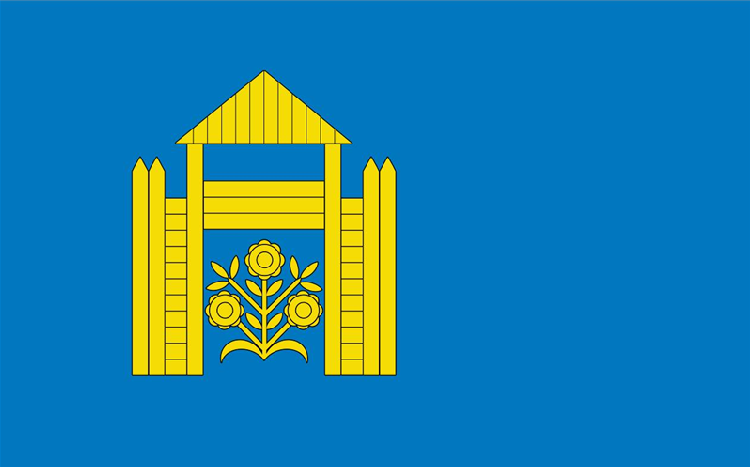
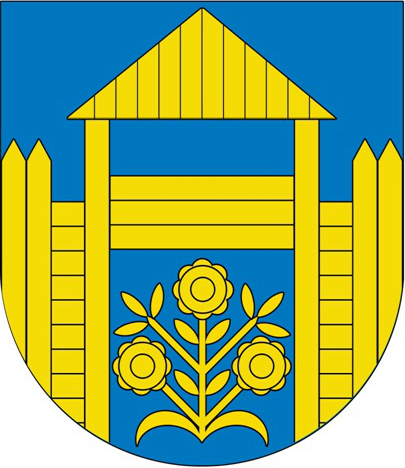
- Flag Coat of arms

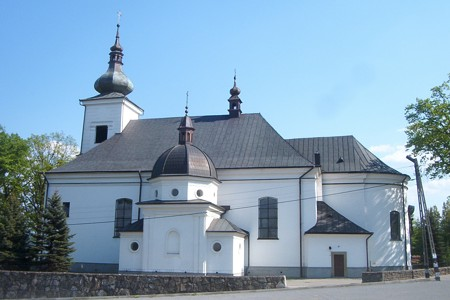
- Coordinates (Podegrodzie): 49°34′N 20°35′E
- Country: Poland
- Voivodeship: Lesser Poland
- County: Nowy Sącz County
- Seat: Podegrodzie

Area
  - Total: 63.74 km^{2} (24.61 sq mi)

Population (2006)
  - Total: 11,607
  - Density: 182.1/km^{2} (471.6/sq mi)

Gmina Podegrodzie is a rural gmina (administrative district) in Nowy Sącz County, Lesser Poland Voivodeship, in southern Poland. Its seat is the village of Podegrodzie, which lies approximately 11 kilometres (7 mi) south-west of Nowy Sącz and 72 km (45 mi) south-east of the regional capital Kraków.

The gmina covers an area of 63.74 square kilometres (24.6 sq mi), and as of 2006 its total population is 11,607.

== Villages ==
Gmina Podegrodzie contains the villages and settlements of Brzezna, Chochorowice, Długołęka-Świerkla, Gostwica, Juraszowa, Mokra Wieś, Naszczowice, Olszana, Olszanka, Podegrodzie, Podrzecze, Rogi and Stadła.

== Neighbouring gminas ==
Gmina Podegrodzie is bordered by the city of Nowy Sącz and by the gminas of Chełmiec, Łącko, Limanowa, Łukowica and Stary Sącz.
