= Dziewięcierz =

- Village
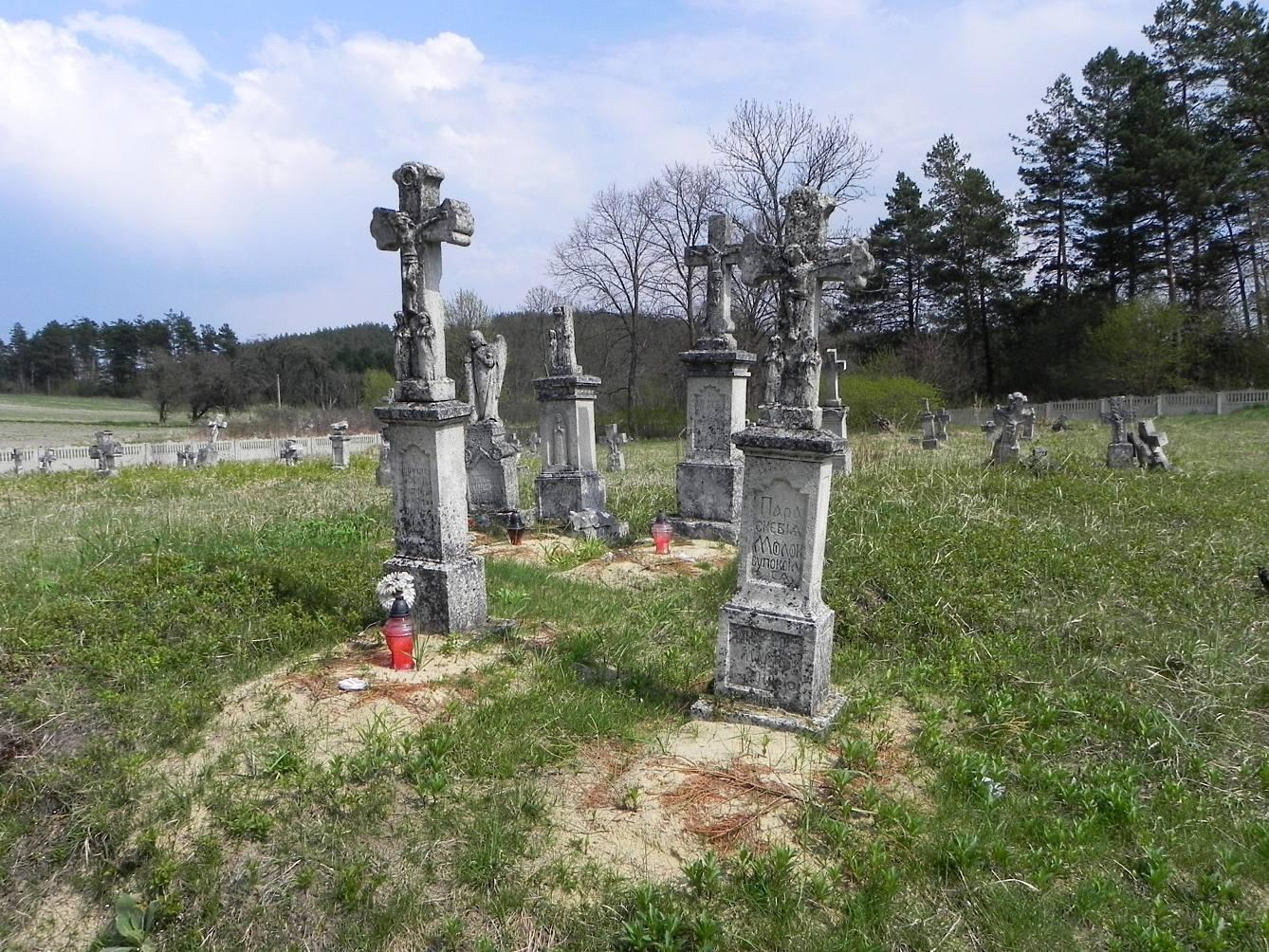
- Greek Catholic cemetery
- Interactive map of Dziewięcierz
- Location within Poland
- Coordinates: 50°13′N 23°29′E
- Country: Poland
- Voivodeship: Subcarpathian
- County: Lubaczów
- Gmina: Horyniec-Zdrój

Dziewięcierz [d͡ʑɛˈvʲɛnt͡ɕɛʂ] is a village in the administrative district of Gmina Horyniec-Zdrój, within Lubaczów County, Subcarpathian Voivodeship, in south-eastern Poland, close to the border with Ukraine.
