= Polanka Horyniecka =

- Village
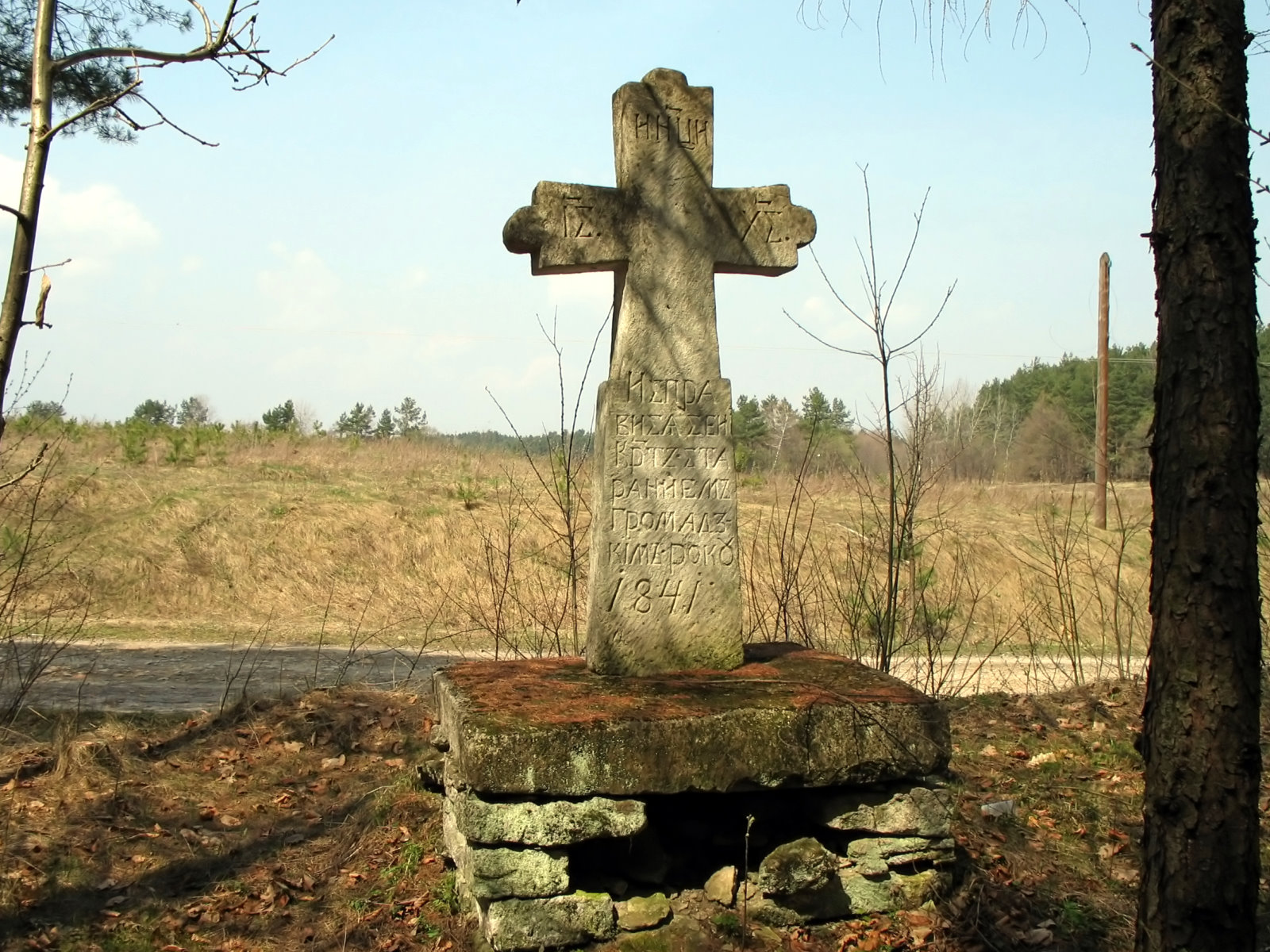
- Wayside cross (1841)

- Location within Poland
- Coordinates: 50°14′37″N 23°19′57″E
- Country: Poland
- Voivodeship: Subcarpathian
- County: Lubaczów
- Gmina: Horyniec-Zdrój
- Established: 1785

Polanka Horyniecka [pɔˈlaŋka xɔrɨˈɲɛt͡ska] is a village in the administrative district of Gmina Horyniec-Zdrój, within Lubaczów County, Subcarpathian Voivodeship, in south-eastern Poland, close to the border with Ukraine.

The village was established in the course of Josephine colonization by German Roman Catholic and Calvinist settlers in 1785.
