= Olszana =

- Village
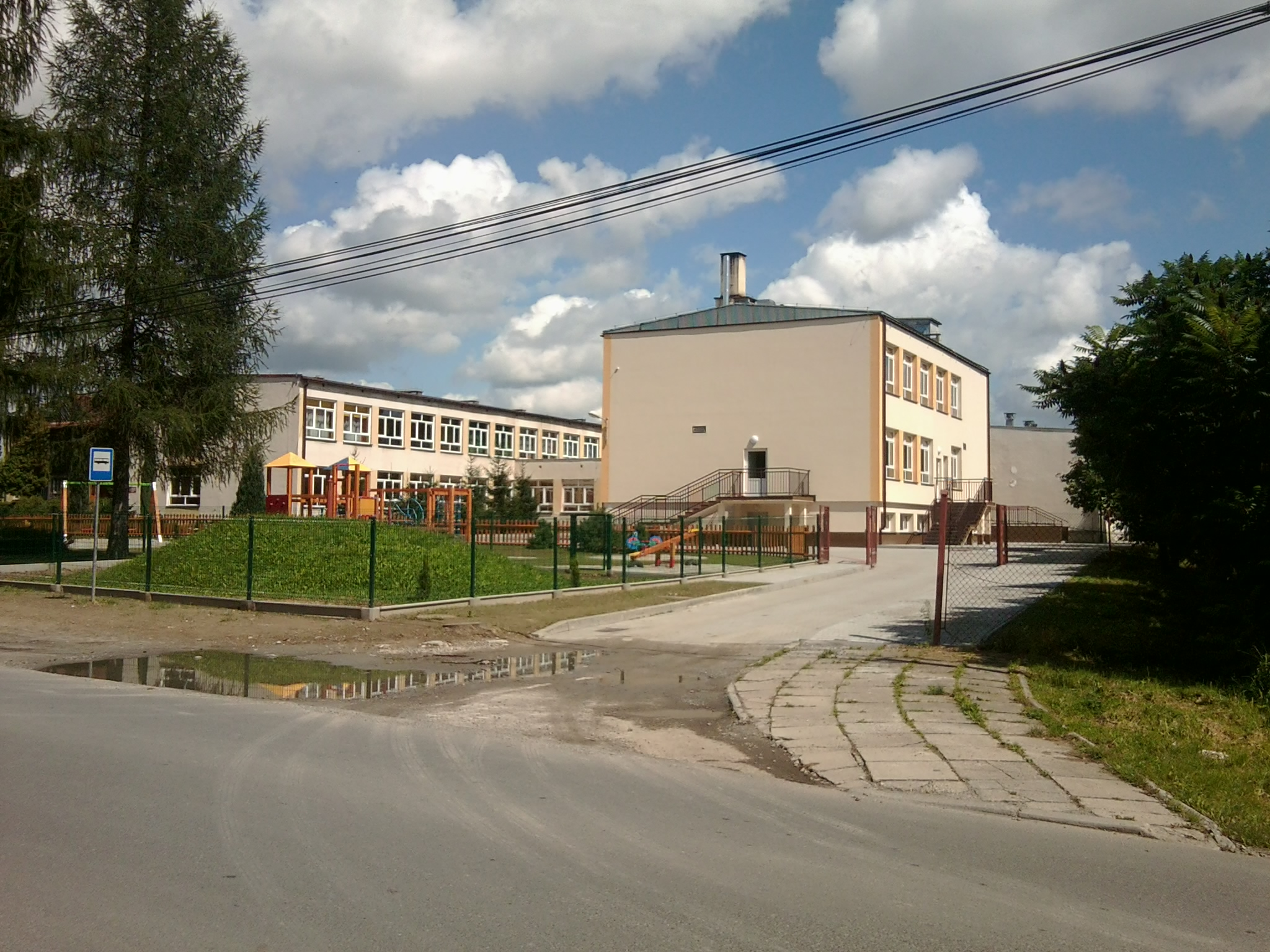
- School

- Location within Poland
- Coordinates: 49°34′N 20°31′E
- Country: Poland
- Voivodeship: Lesser Poland
- County: Nowy Sącz
- Gmina: Podegrodzie
- Population: 1,155
- Website: http://www.olszana.pawart.pl

Olszana [ɔlˈʂana] is a village in the administrative district of Gmina Podegrodzie, within Nowy Sącz County, Lesser Poland Voivodeship, in southern Poland.
