= Gostwica =

- Village
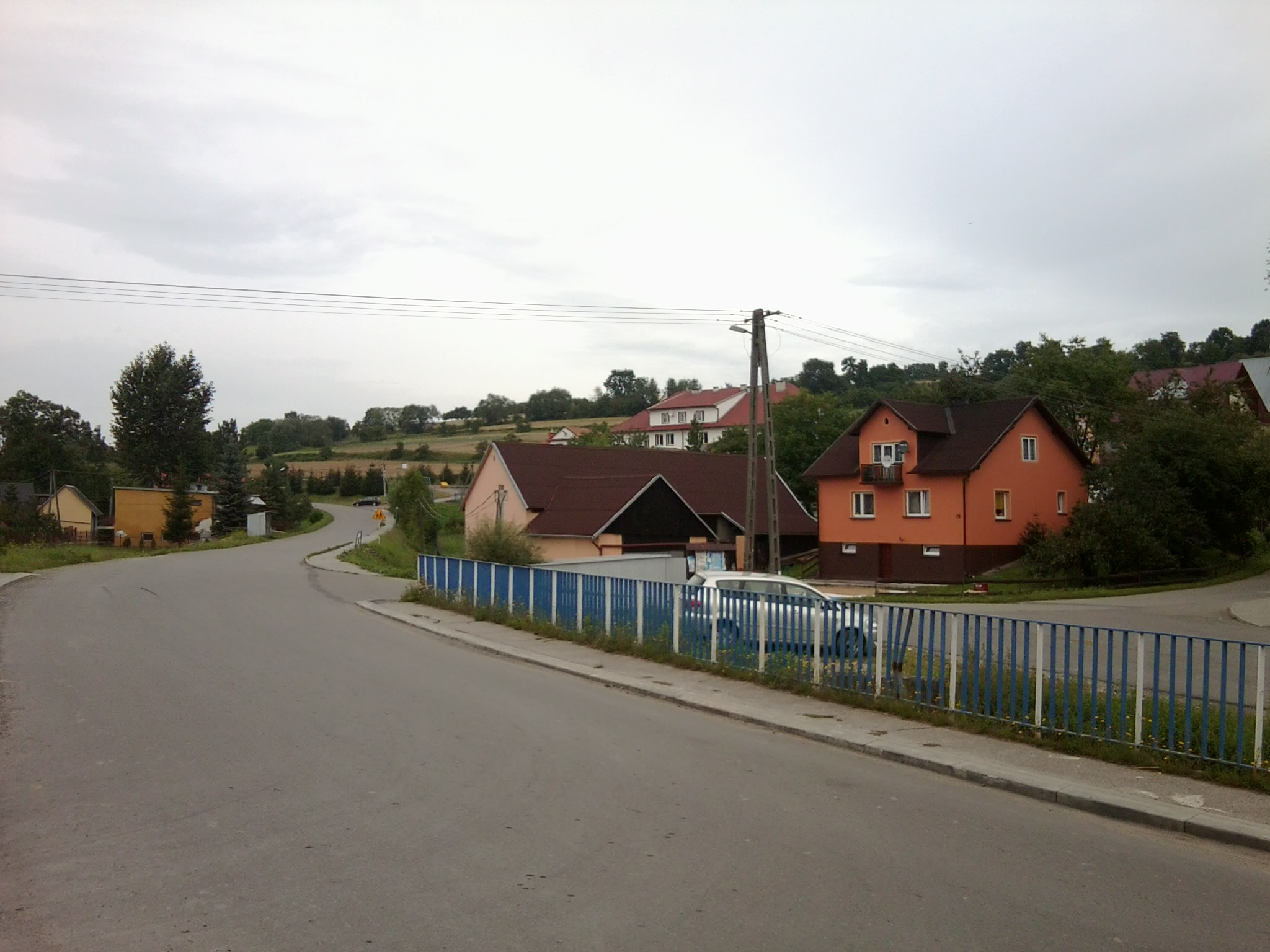

- Location within Poland
- Coordinates: 49°35′44″N 20°35′30″E
- Country: Poland
- Voivodeship: Lesser Poland
- County: Nowy Sącz
- Gmina: Podegrodzie

Gostwica [ɡɔstˈfʲit͡sa] is a village in the administrative district of Gmina Podegrodzie, within Nowy Sącz County, Lesser Poland Voivodeship, in southern Poland.
