= Horyniec-Zdrój =

- Village
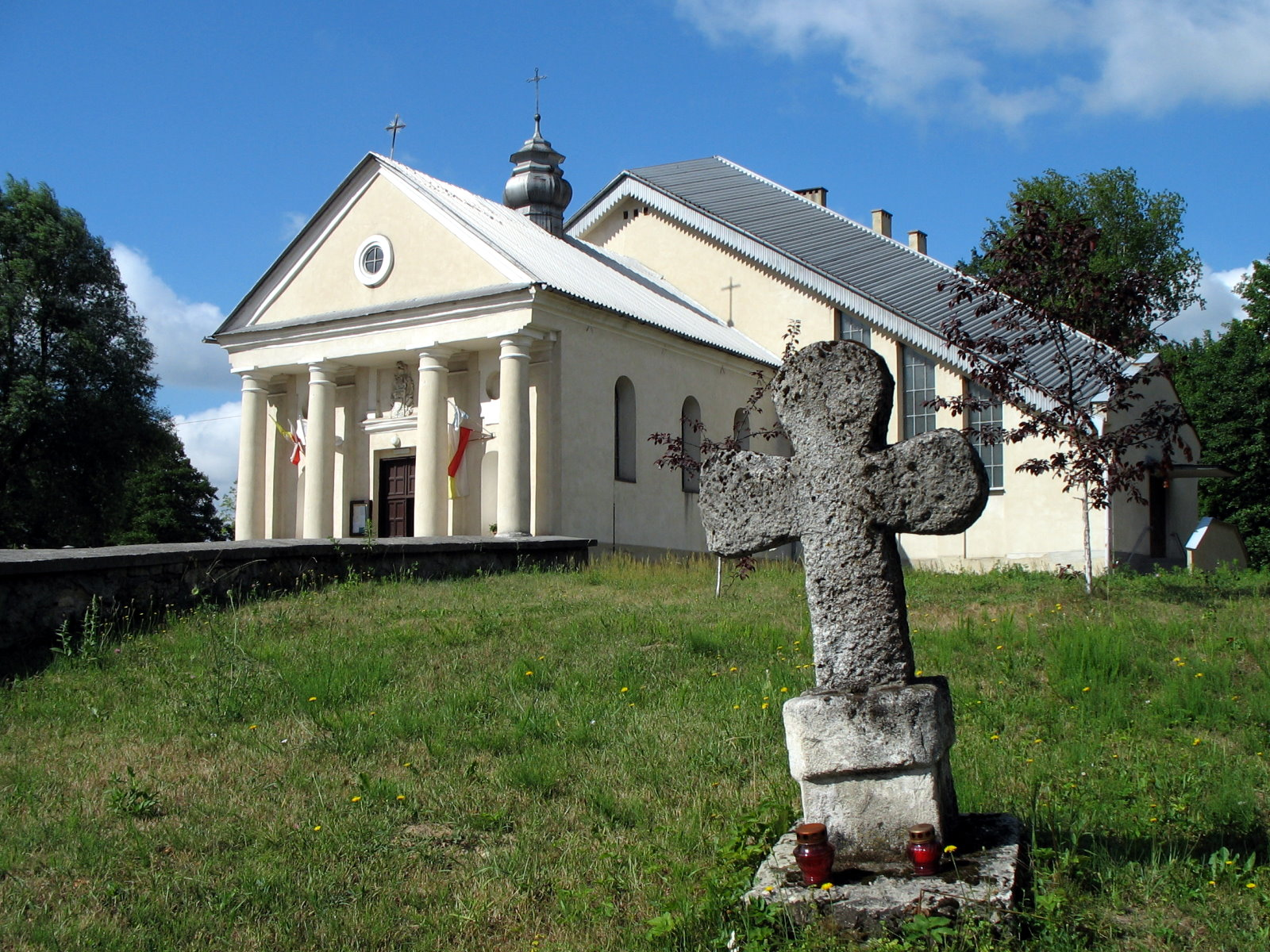
- Church in Horyniec

- Location within Poland
- Coordinates: 50°11′26″N 23°21′43″E
- Country: Poland
- Voivodeship: Subcarpathian
- County: Lubaczów
- Gmina: Horyniec-Zdrój
- Population: 2,700

Horyniec-Zdrój [xɔˈrɨɲɛt͡s ˈzdrui̯] is a village in Lubaczów County, Subcarpathian Voivodeship, in south-eastern Poland, about 4 kilometres (2.5 mi) from the border with Ukraine. It is the seat of the gmina (administrative district) called Gmina Horyniec-Zdrój.

Horyniec-Zdrój is a spa village with three large sanitariums - CRR KRUS (Horyniec-Zdrój), Bajka (Horyniec-Zdrój) and Uzdrowisko Horyniec (Horyniec-Zdrój) (Sanitarium Horyniec-Zdrój). The population consists largely of farmers, owning their own small farms.

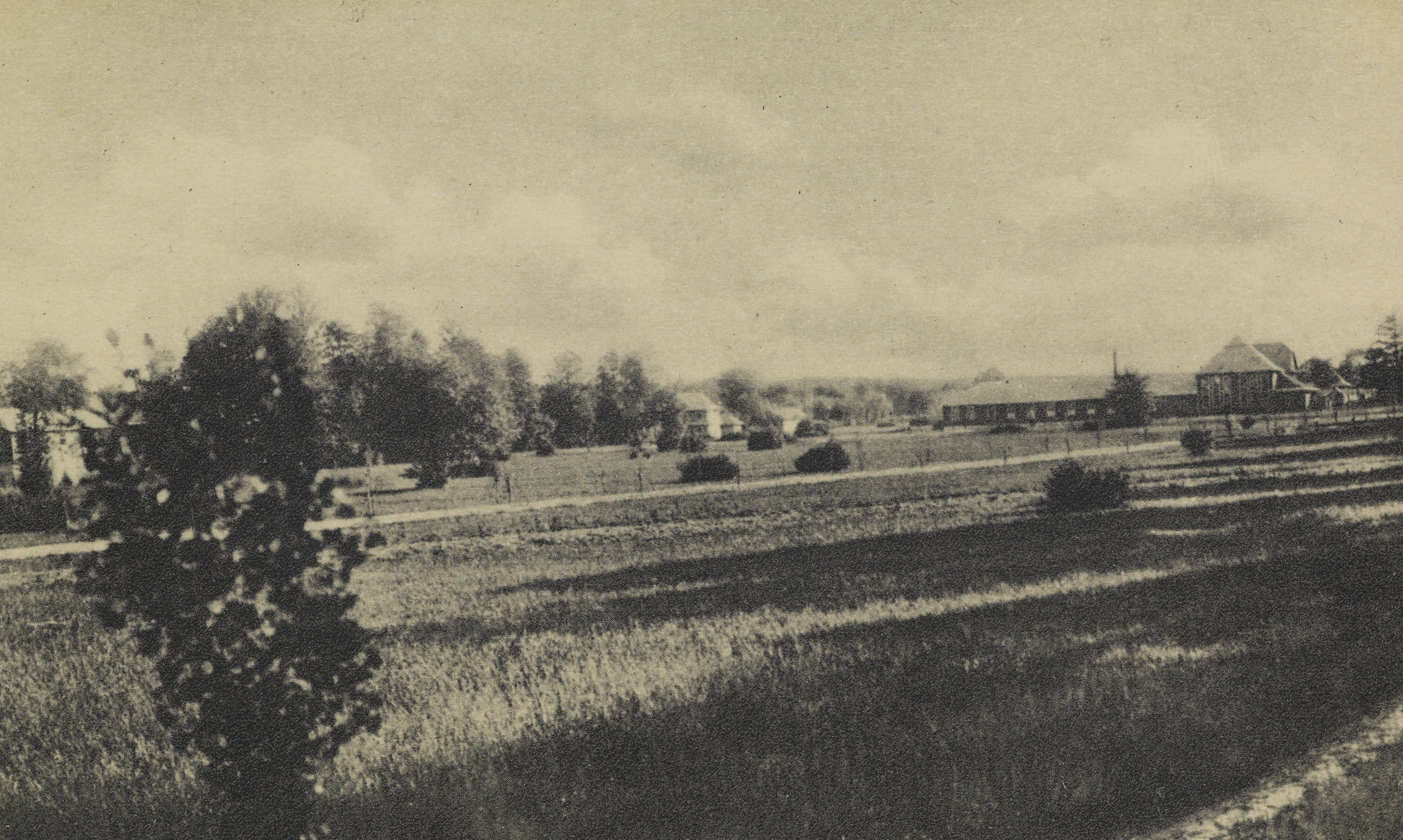
General view, ca 1906-1918

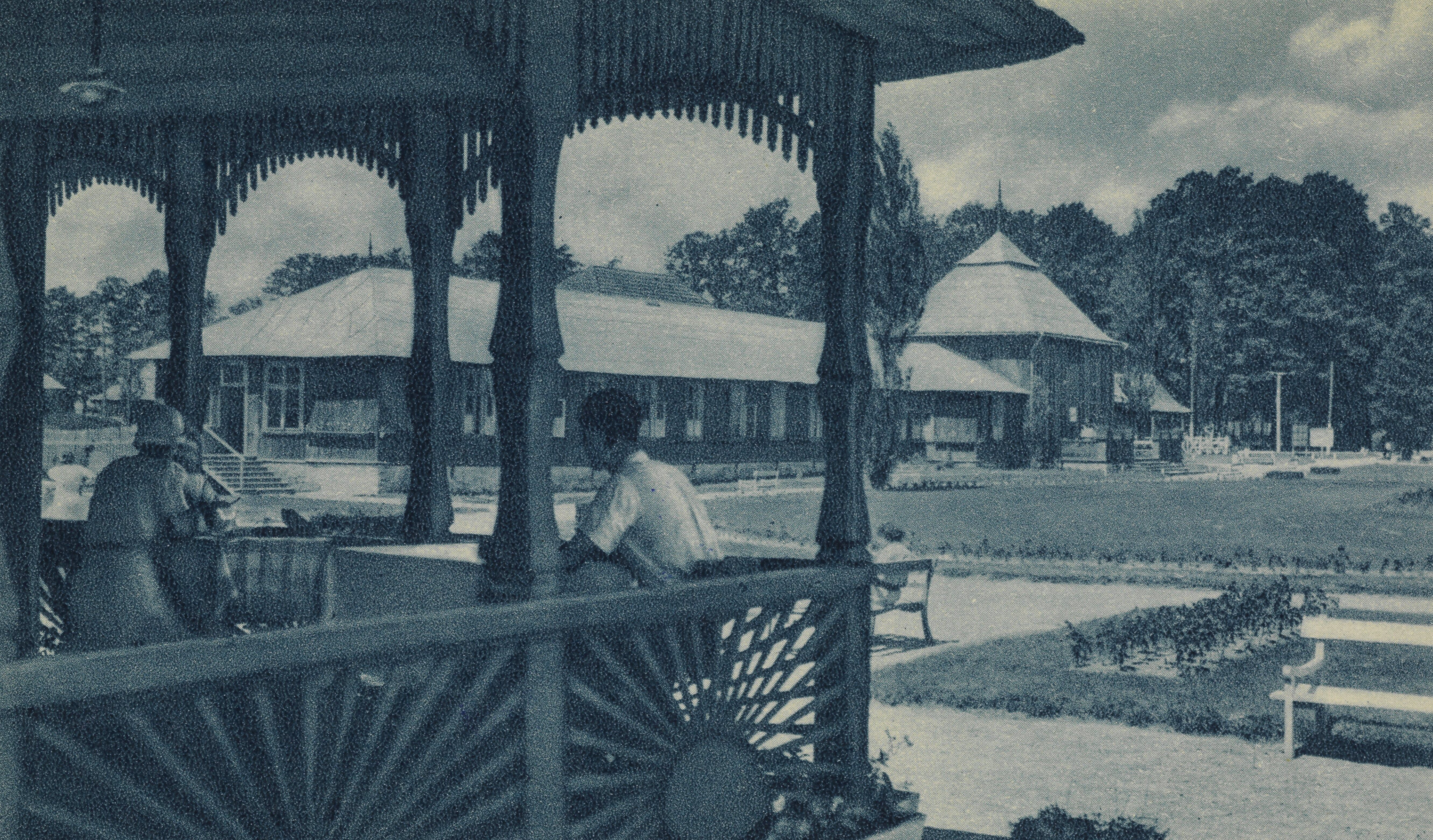
Łazienki siarczano-borowinowe, około 1906-1918
