= Werchrata =

- Village
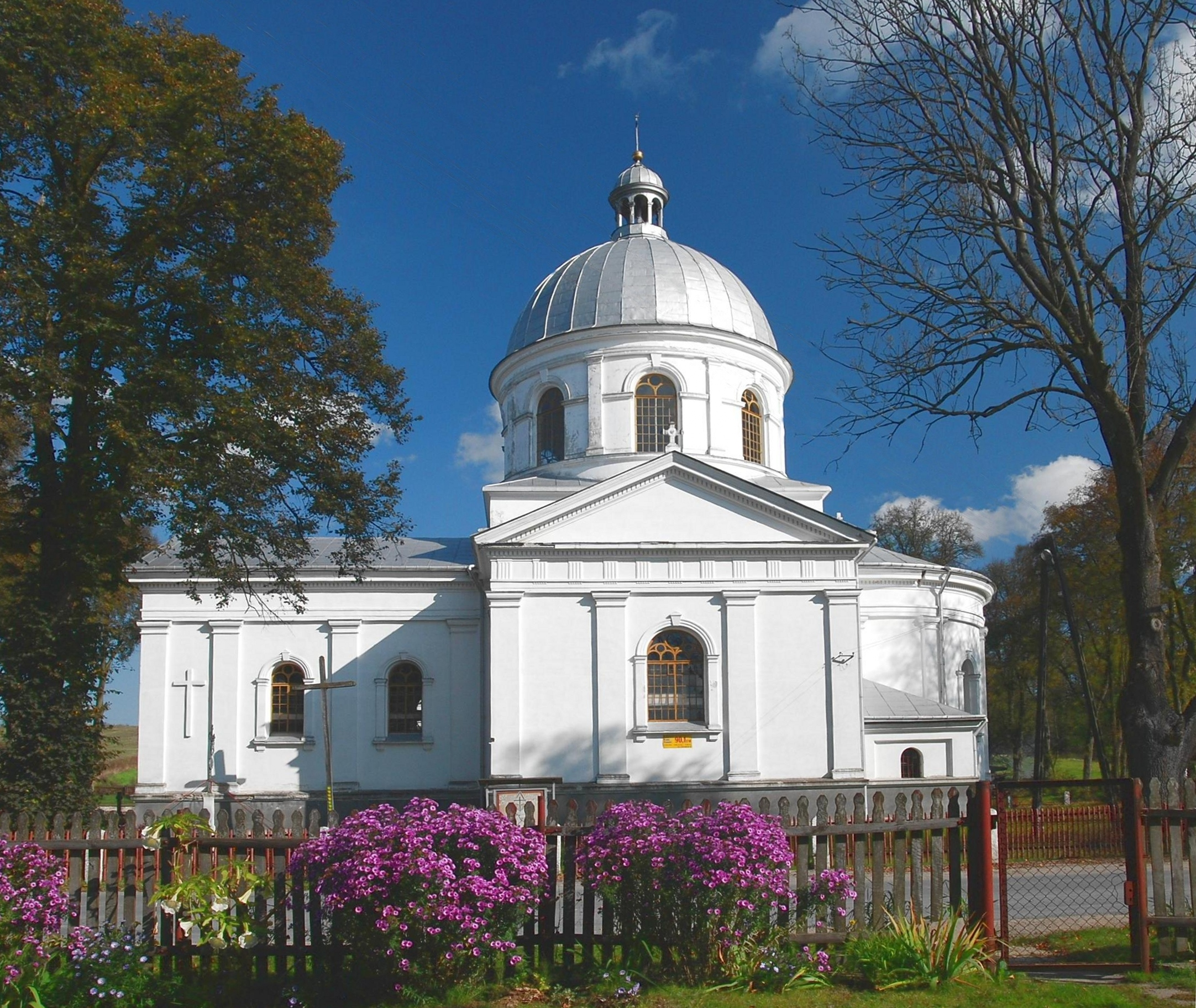
- Church in Werchrata
- Interactive map of Werchrata
- Location within Poland
- Coordinates: 50°15′N 23°28′E
- Country: Poland
- Voivodeship: Subcarpathian
- County: Lubaczów
- Gmina: Horyniec-Zdrój
- Population: 460

Werchrata ([vɛrˈxrata], Ukrainian: Верхрата) is a village in the administrative district of Gmina Horyniec-Zdrój, within Lubaczów County, Subcarpathian Voivodeship, in south-eastern Poland, close to the border with Ukraine.

The village is located in the area of Roztocze on the river Rata. It was historically part of Galicia, and belonged to Rawa district, and later was part of Lublin Voivodeship. Between 1678 and 1806 a Greek Catholic monastery was active in the village; its wonderworking icon of the Mother of God was later moved to Krekhiv.
