= Olszanka, Lesser Poland Voivodeship =

Olszanka
- Village
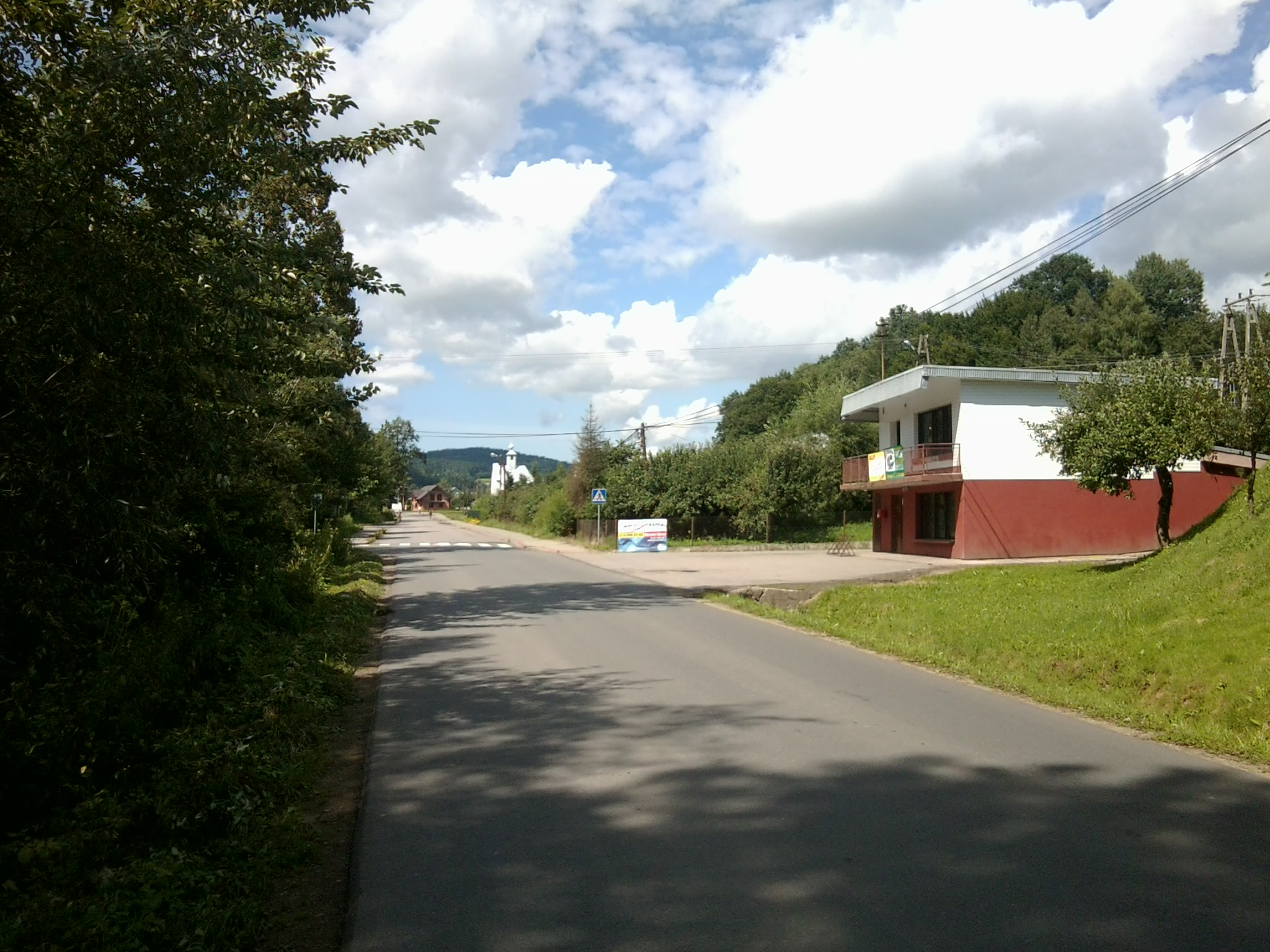

- Location within Poland
- Coordinates: 49°33′23″N 20°32′30″E
- Country: Poland
- Voivodeship: Lesser Poland
- County: Nowy Sącz
- Gmina: Podegrodzie

Olszanka [ɔlˈʂaŋka] is a village in the administrative district of Gmina Podegrodzie, within Nowy Sącz County, Lesser Poland Voivodeship, in southern Poland.
