= Gołkowice Dolne =

- Village
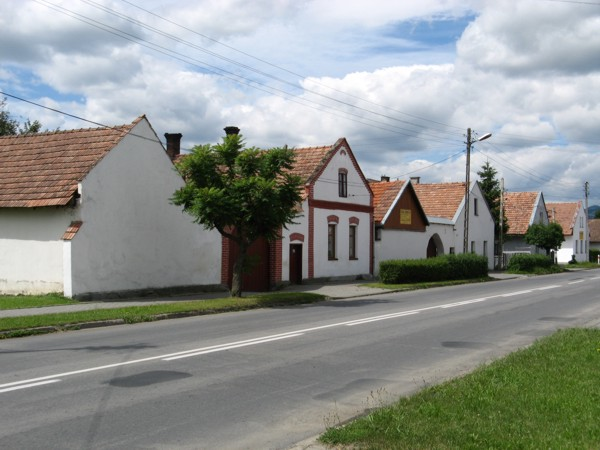
- Typical architecture of German settlers from the late 18th century

- Location within Poland
- Coordinates: 49°32′44″N 20°34′41″E
- Country: Poland
- Voivodeship: Lesser Poland
- County: Nowy Sącz
- Gmina: Stary Sącz
- Population: 890

Gołkowice Dolne ([ɡɔu̯kɔˈvit͡sɛ ˈdɔlnɛ]; German: Golkowitz) is a village in the administrative district of Gmina Stary Sącz, within Nowy Sącz County, Lesser Poland Voivodeship, in the historical region of Galicia situated in southern Poland.

The village Gołkowice was first mentioned in 1276. Beginning in 1784, 37 German families were settled here in the course of the Josephine colonization.
