= Vypuchky =

Abandoned village in Lviv Oblast, Ukraine

Vypuchky Випучки
- Village
- Location within Lviv Oblast Location within Ukraine
- Coordinates: 49°28′39″N 23°44′37″E
- Country: Ukraine
- Oblast: Lviv
- Raion: Drohobych

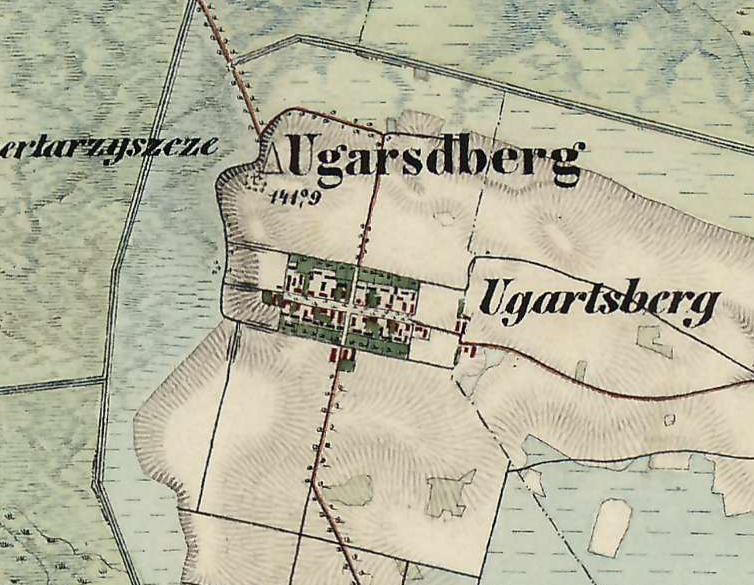
18th century map

Vypuchky (Ukrainian: Випучки) is an abandoned village in Drohobych Raion, Lviv Oblast, in west Ukraine.

The village was established in the course of the Josephine colonization by German Calvinist settlers in 1785. It was arranged on cross plan and named Ugartsberg ("Ugart's Mountain"), after Alois Ugarte, Vice-Governor of Galicia.

In the interwar period it was located in Lwów Voivodeship in Poland. In the late 1930s, the municipality's German name was changed to the Polish Wypuczko, also Wypuczki. In January 1940, the local German population was moved out, and afterwards the village remained abandoned.
