= DA20 (disambiguation) =

Diamond DA20 is a light aircraft.

DA20 may also refer to:

- Dassault Falcon 20, a business jet
- ДA20 (DA20) class of ALCO RSD-1 diesel-electric locomotive
