= Malyshev Factory =

Heavy equipment and defense manufacturer in Kharkiv, Ukraine

Coordinates: 49°58′11″N 36°16′51″E

- Native name: Завод імені В.О. Малишева
- Type: State-owned
- Industry: Defense; Machine
- Founded: 1945 (initially in 1895)
- Headquarters: Kharkiv, Ukraine
- Products: Tanks, locomotives, ship parts
- Number of employees: 5000 (2015)
- Parent: Ukroboronprom

The Malyshev Factory (Ukrainian: Завод імені В.О. Малишева, romanized: Zavod imeni V.O. Malysheva; abbreviated ЗІМ, ZIM), formerly the Kharkov Locomotive Factory (Russian: Харьковский паровозостроительный завод, romanized: Khar'kovskiy parovozostroitel'nyy zavod, ХПЗ, KhPZ), is a state-owned manufacturer of heavy equipment in Kharkiv, Ukraine. It was named after the Soviet politician Vyacheslav Malyshev. The factory is part of the state concern, Ukroboronprom.

It produces diesel engines, farm machinery, coal mining, sugar refining, and wind farm equipment, but is best known for its production of Soviet tanks, including the BT tank series of fast tanks, the famous T-34 of the Second World War, the Cold War T-64 and T-80, and their modern Ukrainian successor, the T-84. The factory is closely associated with the Morozov Design Bureau (KMDB), designer of military armoured fighting vehicles and the Kharkiv Engine Design Bureau (KEDB) for engines. In 1958, it developed the Kharkovchanka, an off-road vehicle which reached the South Pole the following year.

At its height during the Soviet era, the factory employed 60,000 of Kharkiv's 1.5 million inhabitants.

As of 2015, 5,000 people worked at the factory.

== Naming ==
The factory was renamed several times. First originally named in Russian, English-language sources variously refer to it as factory, plant, or works, though now use the Ukrainian translation of the word zavod (works).

== Timeline ==
- 1895—Establishment of the Kharkov Locomotive Factory (Russian: Харьковский паровозостроительный завод or KhPZ, Khar'kovskiy parovozostroitel'nyy zavod, ХПЗ / Ukrainian: Харківський паровозобудівний завод, romanized: Kharkivskyy parovozobudivnyy zavod)
- 1923—Production line for Kommunar tractors established
- 1928—Renamed Kharkov Komintern Locomotive Factory (Russian: Khar'kovskiy parovozostroitel'nyy zavod imeni Kominterna, Харьковский паровозостроительный завод имени Коминтерна), and the tank design bureau is established
- 1936—Renamed Factory No. 183 (Zavod No. 183)
- 1941—Evacuated to Nizhny Tagil in the Urals and merged with the Uralvagonzavod Factory, to form the Ural Tank Factory No. 183
- 1945—Re-established at Kharkov Diesel Factory No. 75
- 1957—Renamed Malyshev Plant (Ukrainian: Zavod imeni V.A. Malysheva, Завод імені В.А. Малишева)

== History ==
The Kharkov Locomotive Factory (KhPZ) built about 20% of the Russian Empire's railway engines. After the Russian Revolution and the establishment of the Soviet government in Ukraine, the factory was put to work designing and building tractors and, after 1927, tanks. The Leningrad's Bolshevik Factory and the Kharkov's KhPZ in 1929 became the first two Soviet tank factories to be modernized with German assistance under the Treaty of Rapallo, 1922.

=== Tank production ===
A tank design bureau was established in the factory in 1928, one of several which would be responsible for some of the most successful tanks ever built, and eventually become the Morozov Design Bureau. The KhPZ designed and produced twenty-five T-24 tanks, then nearly eight thousand BT fast tanks. It also built a handful of multi-turreted T-35 tanks.

Shortly before the German invasion of the Soviet Union the KhPZ started series production of the T-34, the most-produced tank of World War II. Series production began in June 1940 in Kharkov, and later in the Stalingrad Tractor Plant and Krasnoye Sormovo Shipbuilding Plant. In 1941, due to German advances, the factory and design shops were evacuated to the Ural Mountains; the plant was merged with Uralvagonzavod in Nizhny Tagil into one enterprise called Ural Tank Plant No. 183.

After Soviet victory over the Germans, it began production of the new T-44 tank in 1945, and the first prototypes of the T-54. After the war was over, the design bureau and factory gradually transferred all operations back to Kharkov. The "No. 183" designation was left in Nizhny Tagil, while in Kharkov the factory merged into Factory No. 75, a previously existing plant known for its T-34 diesel engines. T-54 production was started in the Urals and Kharkov in 1947–1948, and the move ended with the 1951 re-establishment of the Design Bureau, now called KB-60M, in Kharkov. In 1957, the Factory No. 75 was renamed Malyshev Plant, and next year it took up production of T-55, the most-produced tank ever. The bureau also designed OT-54 and TO-55 flame-thrower tanks, for production at the Omsk Transport Machine Construction Plant. In 1967, T-64 tank production began here, as well as in the Kirov Plant and in the Uralvagonzavod. The T-80 tank, with a high performance gas turbine engine was produced beginning in 1983, followed in 1985 by a more conventional diesel model, T-80UD.

Finished tanks were assembled in several plants, but Soviet industrial planning prevented any region from being able to establish independent arms production. Components and sub-assemblies were produced in different factories, the Malyshev Factory specializing in engines and transmissions.

=== In independent Ukraine ===
The Malyshev factory's million-square-metre facility produced 800 tanks in 1991, but underwent difficult times after the breakup of the Soviet Union, producing only 46 tanks until 1996, when a $650 M contract was signed to supply 320 T-80UD tanks to Pakistan. Fulfilling the contract was difficult — the distributed nature of Soviet military industry forced reliance on Russian factories for parts, and Russian political interference forced the development of local capabilities, resulting in the T-84 tank design.

Like many Ukrainian industries, Malyshev was not allowed to negotiate contracts directly with foreign governments, but had to rely on Ukrspetsexport, a government arms-trading company. Although Malyshev was denied exporter status in July 1999, it was given this status by decree of President Leonid Kuchma in November of that year, a move seen to be an election gift to Kharkiv Oblast. Malyshev joined as the leader of thirty-four companies to form an export consortium called Ukrainian Armored Vehicles.

Malyshev has demonstrated main battle tanks to Turkey, Greece, and Malaysia, and has entered into a contract to supply engines for Chinese-made Al-Khalid tanks for Pakistan. In September 2000, a deal was signed to modernize Soviet-made tanks and armoured personnel carries for the United Arab Emirates. The Malyshev factory also manufactures parts for Bizon, a Polish producer of agricultural combines.

In April 2009, the Malyshev Factory signed a contract to upgrade 29 T-64B [Т-64Б] tanks to T-64BM "Bulat" [Т-64БМ "Булат"] standard, for the Ukrainian Army for ₴200 million ($25.1 million). Ten upgraded tanks were delivered in 2010, and 19 planned to be delivered in 2011. The T-64B tanks being upgraded were originally produced at Kharkov in 1980.

In 2012 the Malyshev Factory had a sizable tank scrapping operation.

Since the outbreak of the war in Donbas the factory's main focus became supplying new and rehabilitated tanks to the Ukrainian Army.

On 22 July 2014 the factory was used as a transfer point in returning the bodies from the Malaysia Airlines Flight 17 crash to their home countries.

The factory was struck by Russian missiles in March 2022, December 2022, and February 2023.

== Production ==
=== Locomotives ===
Locomotive production was performed from 1897 to 1969. Until the invasion of Soviet Union by Germany in 1941, the factory was producing steam locomotives which were produced on several factories of the Russian Empire and the Soviet Union. After the war and rebuilding of the factory in 1947, it produced diesel locomotives until 1969.

- 1897–1915 Russian locomotive class O (particularly О^{д} and О^{в})
- 1906–1916 Russian locomotive class Shch
- 1912–1919 Russian locomotive class S (about 9 were produced in the Ukrainian State in 1918–19)
- 1915–1917 Russian locomotive class E (possibly through 1935)
- 1924–1951 Russian locomotive class S (enforced)
- 1935–1941 Soviet locomotive class SO
- 1939–1941 Tender with water heating for SO18
- 1947–1950 TE1 (along with the Kharkov Elektrotyazhmash and the Moscow Dynamo)
- 1948–1955 TE2 (along with the Kharkov Elektrotyazhmash)
- 1953–1973 TE3 (along with the Kharkov Elektrotyazhmash, the Luhanskteplovoz and the Kolomna Factory)
- 1952–1952 TE4 (only one built as experimental, based on TE2)
- 1948–1948 TE5 (only two built as experimental, based on TE1)
- 1956-1964 TE7 (along with the Luhanskteplovoz, based on TE3)
- 1958-1997 TE10 (along with the Luhanskteplovoz)
- 1961-1968 TEP10 (initially as TE11)
- 1964-1968 2TE40 (along with the Kharkov Elektrotyazhmash, only five built as experimental)

=== Tracked vehicles ===
The factory specialized in tank manufacture, and also constructed artillery tractors, and initially agricultural tractors.

- 1924−1931 Communard (used in agriculture)
- 1935−1940 Comintern
- 1939−1941 Voroshylovets
- 400-series
- 1958−1958 Kharkovchanka, a special purpose vehicle for Antarctica (4th Soviet Antarctic Expedition)

=== Engines ===
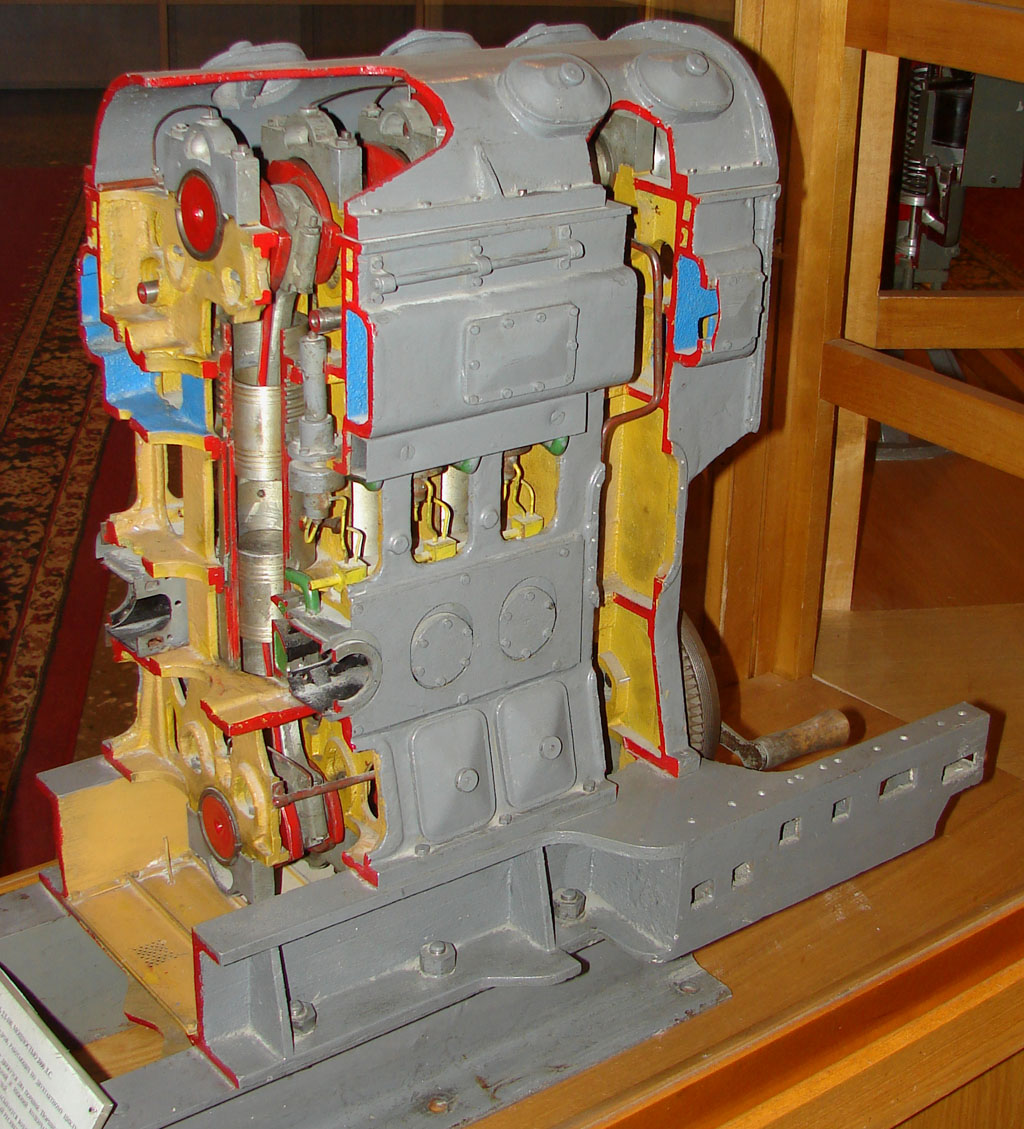
Cutaway 2D100 engine

Notable diesel engines from Kharkov include the 1472 kW 2D100 (used in the TE3 locomotive) and the 2208 kW 10D100 (used in the TE10 locomotive). Both were 10 cylinder opposed piston two-stroke diesel engines of the 1950s. Another engine in this series, the 12 cylinder 9D100 was less successful and was not widely used.

== Bibliography ==
- Zaloga, Steven J. & Grandsen, James (1984). Soviet Tanks and Combat Vehicles of World War Two. London: Arms and Armour Press. ISBN 0-85368-606-8.
