= TE10 =

Soviet diesel-electric locomotive class

Soviet Class TE10
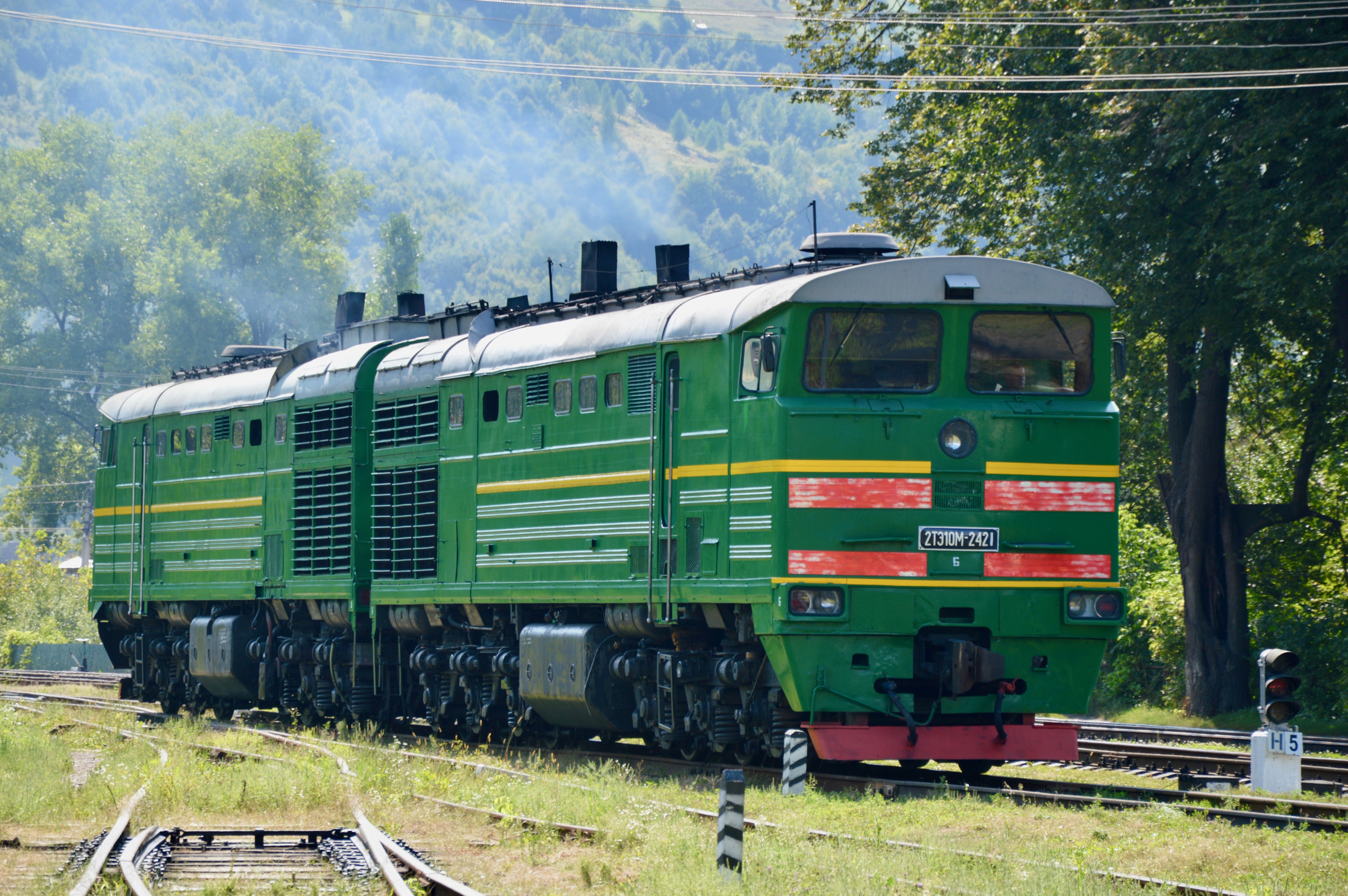
- 2TE10M, the most common variant
Type and origin
- Power type: Diesel-electric
- Builder: Luhanskteplovoz and Malyshev Factory
- Build date: 2ТЭ10 (ТЭ12): 1960—1963 2ТЭ10Л: 1961—1977; 2ТЭ10В: 1975—1981; 2ТЭ10М: 1981—present 2ТЭ10МК: 1981; 2ТЭ10Г: 1988; 2ТЭ10С: 1988; 2ТЭ10У: 1989—present 2ТЭ10УТ: 1989—1997 2ТЭ10УП: 1991
- Total produced: 2ТЭ10 (ТЭ12): 19 2ТЭ10Л: 3,192; 2ТЭ10В: 1,898; 2ТЭ10М: 2,444; 2ТЭ10МК: 20; 2ТЭ10Г: 2; 2ТЭ10С: 3; 2ТЭ10У: 549—555; 2ТЭ10УТ: 99 2ТЭ10УП: 1-2
Specifications
- Configuration
  - AAR: C-C
  - UIC: Co'Co'
- Gauge: 1,520 mm (4 ft 11 27/32 in) Russian gauge
- Fuel type: Diesel
- Fuel capacity: TE10-001 -> 5,500 kg (12,100 lb)
- Prime mover: Kharkiv 10D100
- Engine type: Two-stroke diesel
Performance figures
- Maximum speed: 2ТЭ10Л, 2ТЭ10М 100 km/h (62 mph); 2ТЭ10У 120 km/h (75 mph)
- Power output: 1,830 kW (2,450 hp) - 2,040 kW (2,740 hp) based on modifications
Career
- Nicknames: Chervontsi, Nautilus, Tens
- Locale: Soviet Union; Russia; Ukraine; Belarus; Latvia

The TE10 (Russian: ТЭ10) is a series of diesel-electric locomotives from the Soviet Union. The name of this locomotive (ТЭ10) is from тепловоз с электрической передачей, тип 10, which translates to "diesel-electric locomotive type 10."

== History ==
In 1957–1961, the Kharkiv plant "Electrotyazhmash" and Malyshev Factory designed a new single-unit locomotive with 50% more power than a single TE3 unit and only a slightly greater mass. The result was the TEP10 and TEP10L designs. After 1961, work on the freight version of the design was assigned to the Lugansk works. These designs received the suffix "L" to the name to signify the transfer.

The first locomotive of the new design, designated TE10-001 (Kharkiv), was released in November 1958.

Only small numbers of the TEP variant were produced before the design became a dedicated freight locomotive, while a passenger version was not further developed.

== Engines ==
Initial prototypes used the 12-cylinder 9D100 opposed piston two-stroke diesel engine to achieve the required power levels.

This was based on the Kharkiv 10-cylinder 2D100 two-stroke diesel unit. However problems were encountered and another variant of the 2D100 was used, the 10D100, another 10 cylinder two-stroke diesel design. All derivatives of the TE10 locomotive built as new used this engine.

== Body ==
One of the innovations in Soviet locomotive factories was semi-monocoque construction - the principle of whole body supporting structure (what the US would call a carbody structure). This had previously been used only by the Czechoslovak CHS1 electric locomotives and the Riga ER1 electric train. The body of the locomotive was based on two three-axle trucks like the TE3 predecessor.

With much less weight than the two-unit locomotive TE3, a single TE10 diesel locomotive could successfully replace a pair of TE3s.

== Derivative designs ==
This single unit design formed the basis for a family of locomotives that was built for over 30 years and ranged from single unit passenger locomotives TEP10 through two and three unit freight locomotives 2TE10 3TE10 to four unit very heavy freight 4TE10U engines.

== Gallery ==
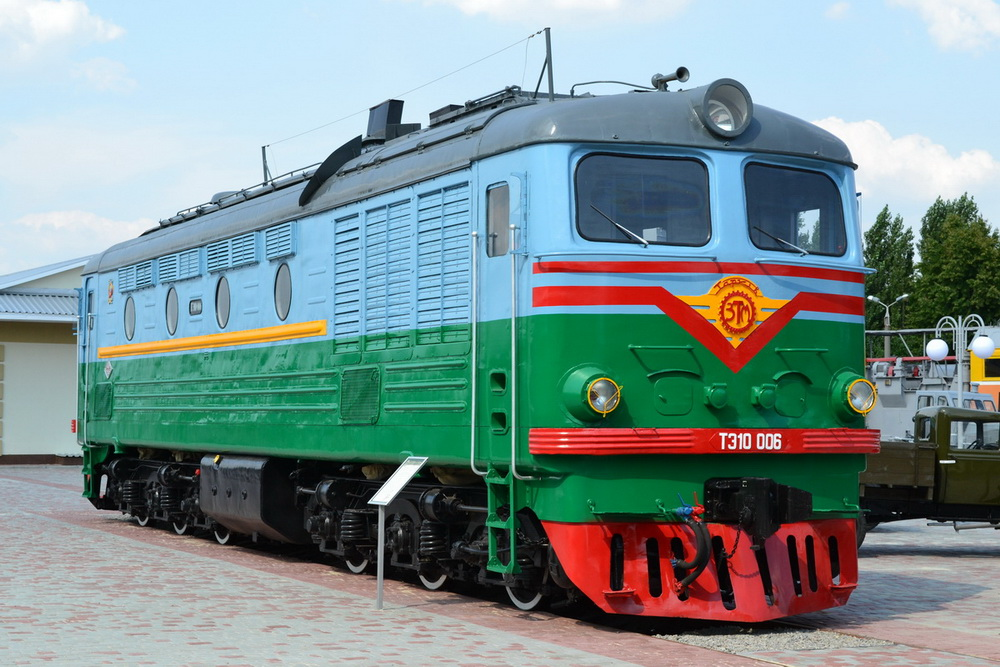
TE10-006

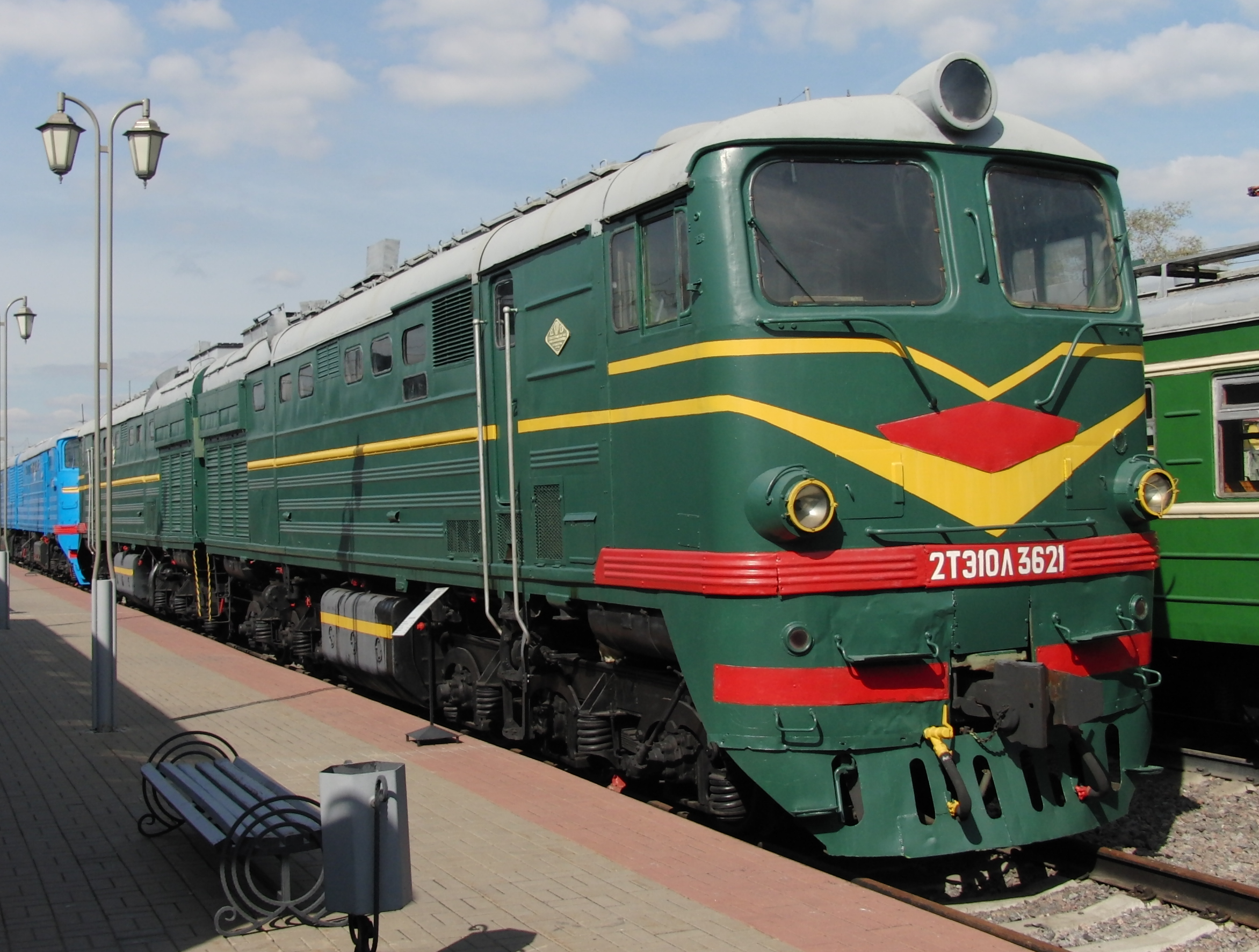
2TE10L-3621

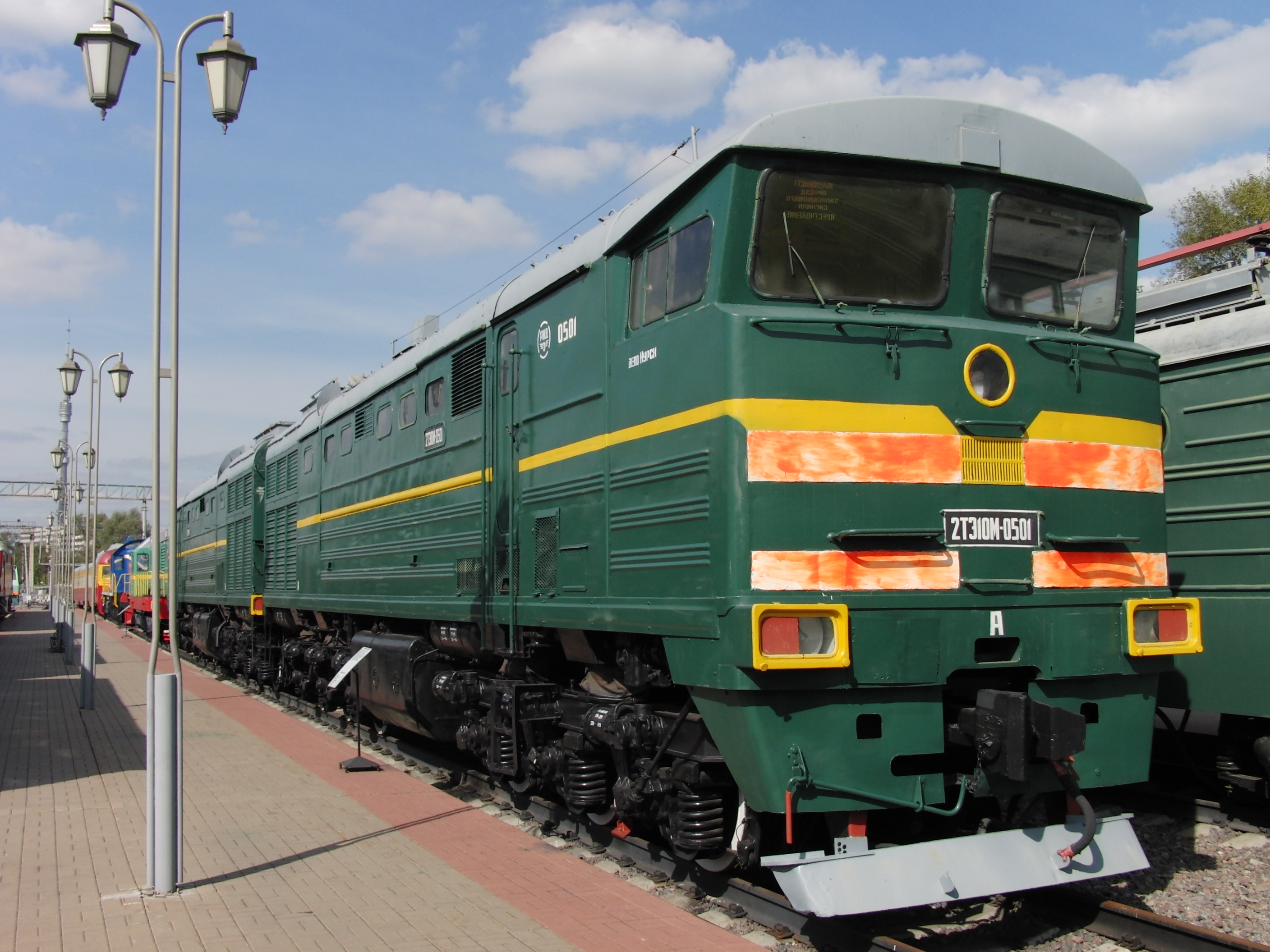
2TE10M-0501

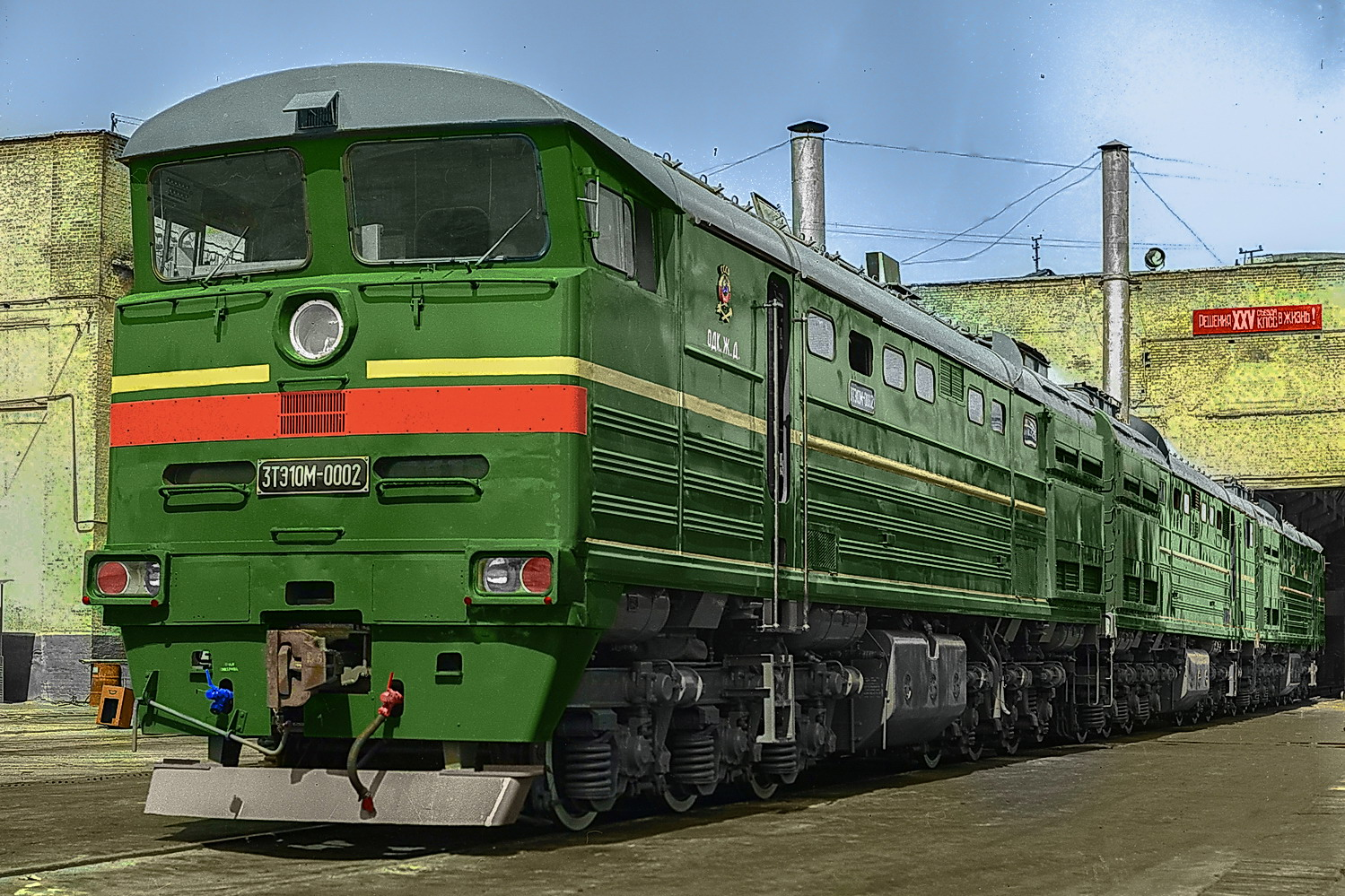
3TE10M-0002

== See also ==
- The Museum of the Moscow Railway, at Paveletsky Rail Terminal, Moscow
- Rizhsky Rail Terminal, Home of the Moscow Railway Museum
- Varshavsky Rail Terminal, St.Petersburg, Home of the Central Museum of Railway Transport, Russian Federation
- History of rail transport in Russia
