= TEM1 =

Soviet diesel-electric locomotive

TEM1 (ТЭМ1)
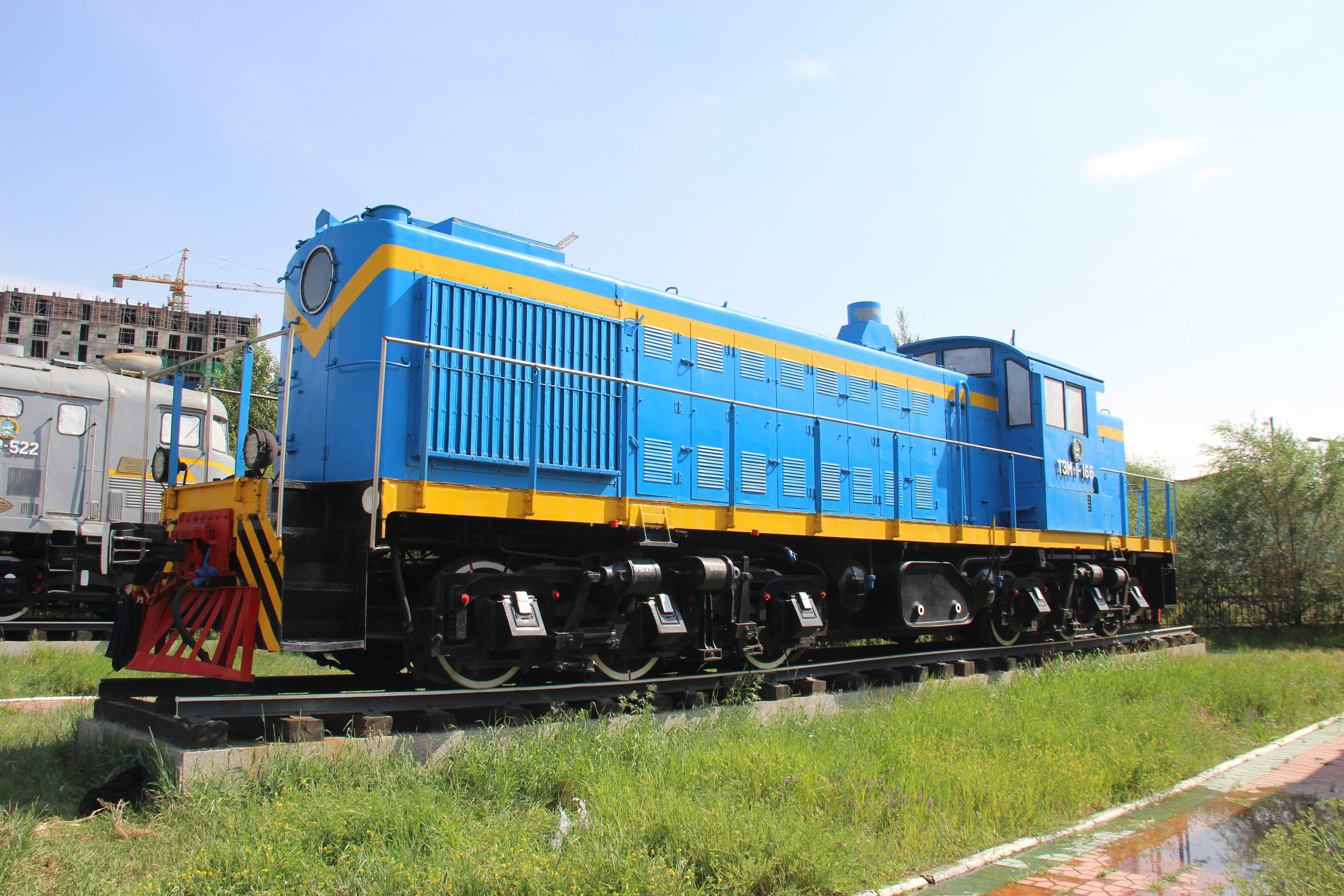
- Preserved example in Mongolia, 2017.
Type and origin
- Builder: Bryansk Locomotive Works
- Build date: 1958–1968
Specifications
- Configuration
  - AAR: Co'Co'
- Gauge: 1,520 mm (4 ft 11 27/32 in) Russian gauge
- Wheel diameter: 1050 mm
- Length: 16,970 mm
- Width: 3080 mm
- Height: 4643 mm
- Loco weight: 120 t
- Fuel capacity: 5440kg
- Prime mover: 2D50
Performance figures
- Maximum speed: 90–100 km/h (56–62 mph)
- Power output: 1,000 hp (1,000 hp)
- Tractive effort: 20,660kg
Career
- Locale: Soviet Union, Soviet Bloc countries

TEM1 (Russian: ТЭМ1) was a Soviet diesel-electric locomotive, produced between 1958 and 1968 at the Bryansk Machinery Plant (BMZ).

== History ==
The locomotive can be seen as a descendant of the DA units imported under Lend-Lease during World War II; TEM1 units were produced between 1958 and 1968 as the evolution of the DA units (which were American ALCO RSD-1 designs). Nearly 2000 TEM1 units were built in as a "serious attempt at ending steam shunting" The units had an improved 2D50 turbocharged diesel engine, derived from the TE3 locomotive.

The layout of the locomotive underwent some changes: the body had the same overall layout, but the driver's cabin was slightly lowered and was placed closer to the rear of the locomotive. Also, and the diesel engine was moved closer to the driver's cabin and was located exactly in the center of the locomotive. The units received the designation TEM1 (T – diesel engine, E – with electric transmission, M – maneuvering). They were the first Soviet diesel shunting locomotives with an electric transmission and the first diesel locomotives produced at the Bryansk Machine Plant (Brianskij maszynostroitielnyj zawod – BMZ). The units were designed by P. Aronow.

The first unit was produced on 19 July 1958. Over the course of their production, these locomotives were subject to minor mechanical changes. Starting with locomotive number TEM1-0270, the driver's cabins were upgraded to include more vertical room near the upper windows improve visibility (as in TEM2). Starting with locomotive No. 950, the installation of bumpers was discontinued (the locomotive had an SA-3 coupling). Gradually, the service weight of the newly- produced locomotives decreased from 126 to 120 tons, while the maximum speed increased from 90 to 100 km / h. Starting in 1965, an improved 2D50M engine was installed, offering reduced fuel consumption. A total of 1946 units were produced, of which 842 were produced for industrial uses. In 1992, 541 of them were still being used in the countries of the former USSR.

== Technical details ==
The 2D50 diesel engine produced 1000 hp at 740 rpm; it was a four-stroke, six-cylinder engine with turbocharger, produced by the Penza Plant in Penza. Inside the engine, cylinder diameter was 318 mm, piston stroke was 330 mm. The power engine had a weight of 17,100 kg. The main generator connected to the drive shaft was an MPT-84/39 (as in the TE1), with a power of 700 kW (and a voltage of 580 V, with a maximum voltage of 900 V at 1200A). The locomotive was also equipped with a secondary inductor unit, a type MWT-25/9 (offering a power of 3.6 kW) and an MWG-25/11 auxiliary generator (with a power of 5 kW).

The EDT-200B traction motors had a power of 87 kW (at 125 V, 820 A). The motors were connected in series or (after exceeding a certain speed) in series and in parallel. The electrical equipment of the locomotive was produced by the Elektrotjażmash plant in Kharkov.
