= Soviet locomotive class TE5 =

TE5 or ТЭ5
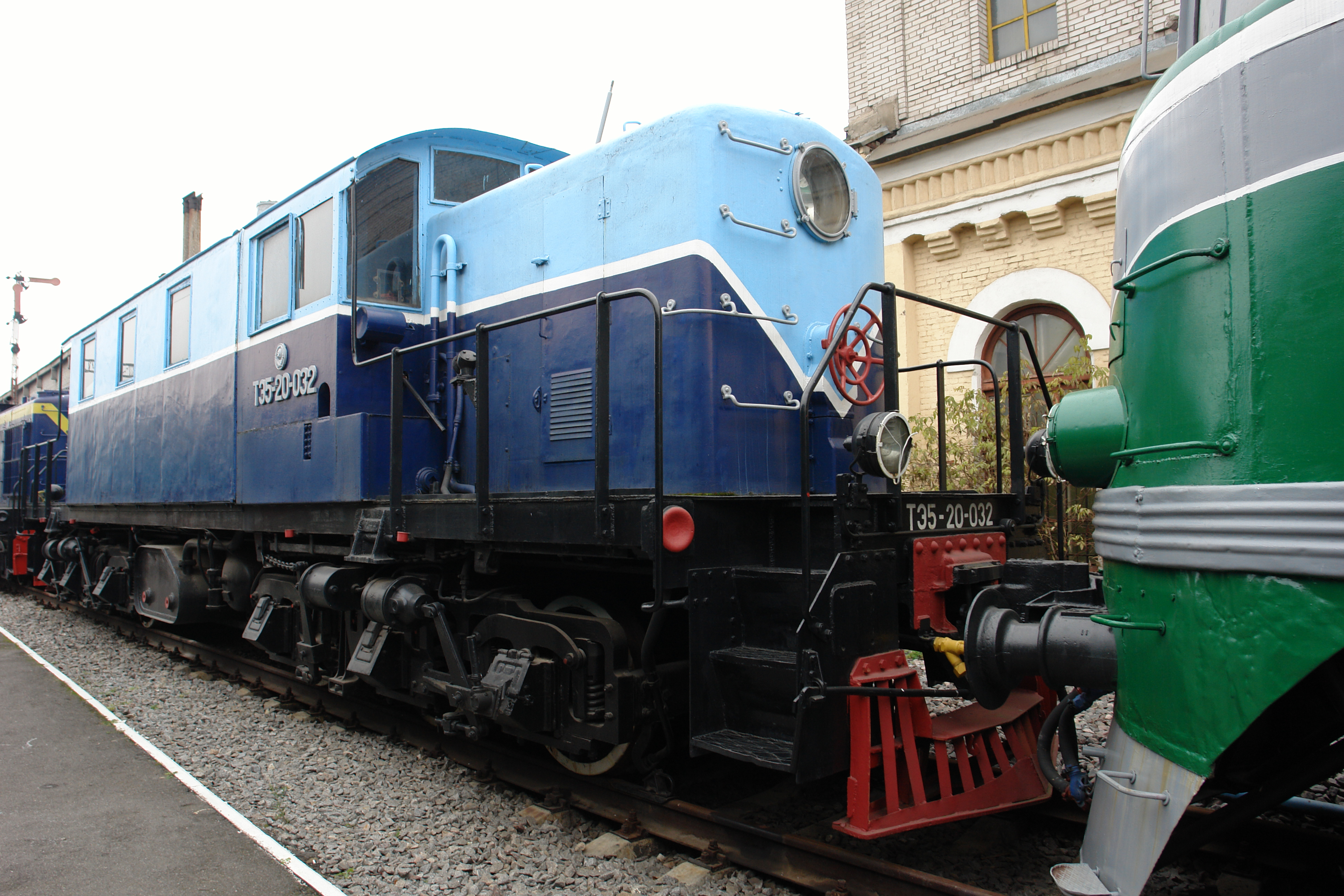
- Diesel loco TE5-20-032 preserved in Saint Petersburg
Type and origin
- Power type: Diesel-electric
- Builder: Kharkov, Ukraine
- Build date: 1948
Specifications
- Configuration
  - UIC: Co-Co
- Transmission: Diesel-electric
Career
- Number in class: 2 (or 5)

The TE5 (Cyrillic script: ТЭ5) is a Soviet experimental diesel-electric locomotive. In 1948 the Malyshev Factory in Kharkiv (Soviet Ukraine) released two (unconfirmed reports say five) of these locomotives, which were developed from the TE1 (ТЭ1). They were designed to work in the harsh climate of the northern regions of the country.

== Overview ==
The diesel generator set on the TE5 is not enclosed in a hood. Instead, it is placed in a car body and a boiler is provided for heating the cab and the machine room. The TE5 is designed to run short hood forward. The other structures, and thus the traction characteristics, are no different from the TE1.

== Service ==
Two TE5 (according to some information, five) were built within the TE1 series, numbers 031 and 032. Initially, the TE5 locomotives worked in the Moscow passenger depot of the Moscow-Kursk railway. They were later in 1949 sent to the depot of the Northern Railway for testing. The TE5 did not go into series production because of the advent of the more modern TE2 (ТЭ2) locomotive.

== Preservation ==
TE5-20-032 is preserved at the railway museum in Saint Petersburg.
