= TEM2 =

Class of diesel-electric locomotive

TEM2 (ТЭМ2)
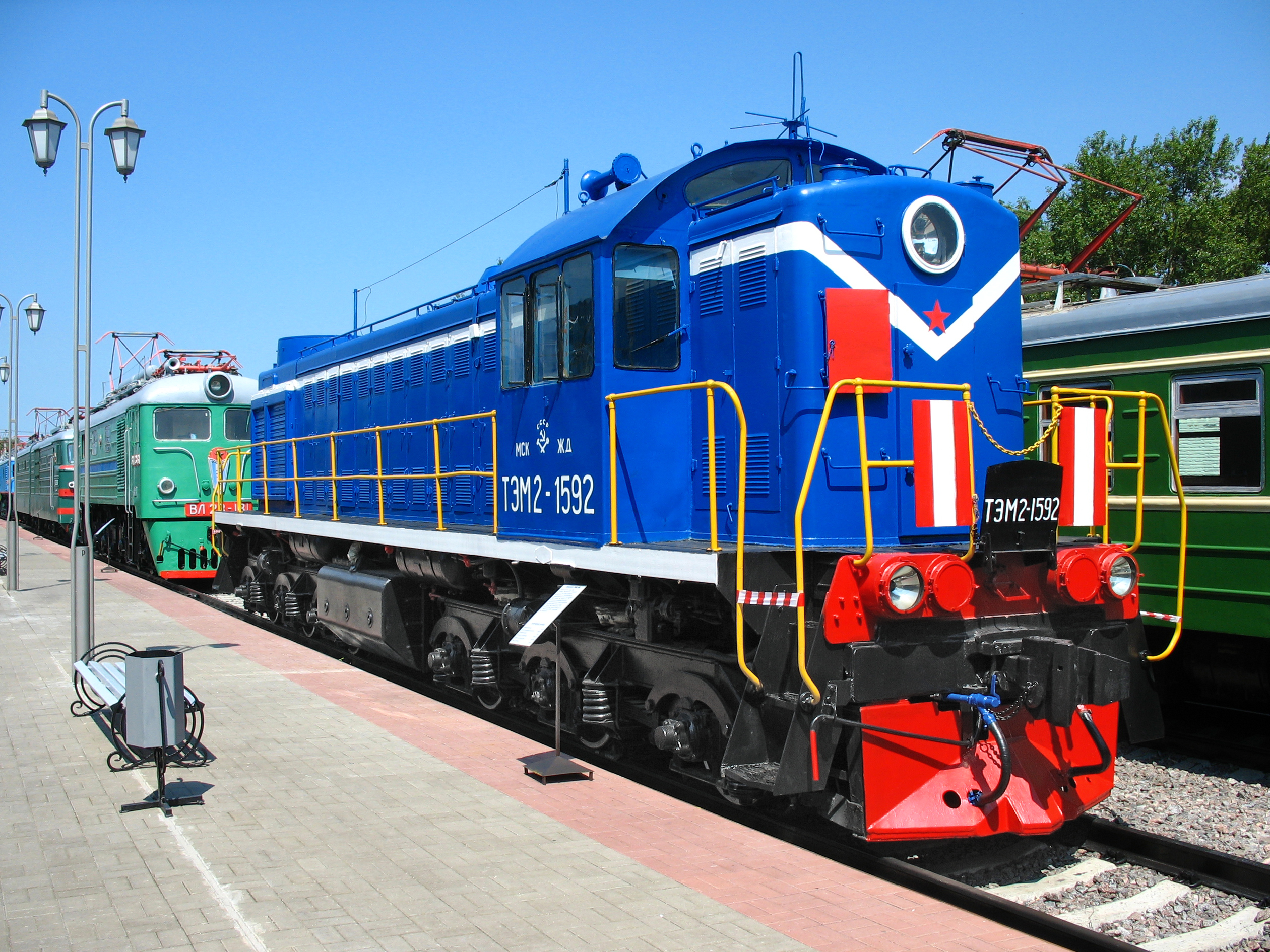
- Preserved example in 2007.
Type and origin
- Builder: Bryansk and Lugansk Locomotive Works
- Build date: 1967–1987
Specifications
- Configuration
  - AAR: Co'Co'
- Gauge: 1,520 mm (4 ft 11 27/32 in) Russian gauge, 1,435 mm (4 ft 8 1/2 in) standard gauge
- Wheelbase
  - Engine: 1
- Length: 17.03 m (55 ft 10 in)
- Width: 3.12 m (10 ft 3 in)
- Height: 4.65 m (15 ft 3 in)
- Axle load: 19.3t
- Loco weight: 120 t
- Fuel type: Diesel
- Fuel capacity: 6,000 liters (1,300 imp gal; 1,600 U.S. gal)
- Prime mover: Penza PD1
- RPM
  - Maximum RPM: 750
- Engine type: Four stroke diesel engine V6
- Aspiration: Turbochargers
- Traction motors: 6 x ED 118A 108 kW
  - Continuous: 875 Amps
- Cylinders: V6
- Cylinder size: 883 mm × 1,200 mm (34.8 in × 47.2 in)
- Transmission: Diesel-electric
- Gear ratio: 75:17
- MU working: No Fitted
- Train heating: No
- Loco brake: Air braked
- Train brakes: Air braked
- Couplers: Russian, Cuba: SA3 coupler, Poland: Screwlink
Performance figures
- Maximum speed: 100 km/h (62 mph)
- Power output: 883 kW (1,184 hp)
- Tractive effort: 380 kN (85,427.40 lbf)
Career
- Operators: PKP, РЖД (RZhD)
- Locale: Soviet Union, Poland, Cuba

TEM2 (Russian: ТЭМ2) is a Soviet diesel-electric shunting locomotive. The locomotive was used throughout the Soviet Union and was exported to Poland and Cuba.

== History ==
The locomotive can be seen as a descendant of the DA units imported under Lend-Lease during World War II; TEM1 units were produced between 1958 and 1968 as the evolution of the DA units (which were American ALCO RSD-1 designs). 2000 TEM1 units were built as part of a "serious attempt at ending steam shunting".

TEM2 is an upgraded version of the TEM1, with 883 kW of power and the same tractive effort as the TEM1, but with an increased speed and a reduced weight. The first prototypes appeared at the Bryansk factory in 1960, with several pilot batches of locomotives built before full production began in 1967. TEM2 was built in both Bryansk and Lugansk until 1987. TEM2 has several subtypes, indicated by suffixes: M (modernized braking), U (improved braking) and T (electric dynamic braking).

== Usage ==
The units are widely associated with the construction of the Baikal–Amur Mainline, providing the hauling power for the construction trains used on the line. Exported to Poland and Cuba,

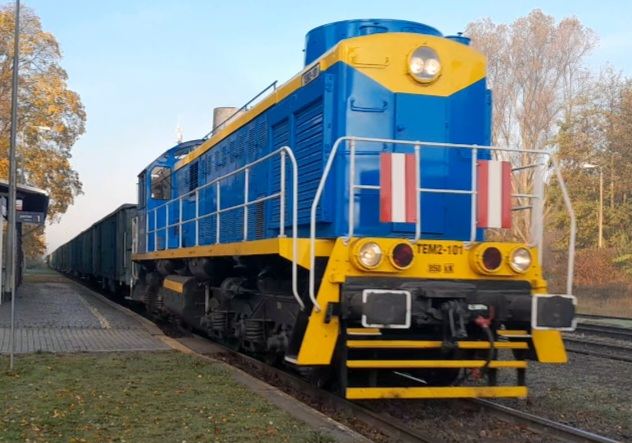
TEM2-101 with a freight train passes through the station of Paczków in Poland

the Polish units can be seen on the standard and broad-gauge rail lines in the country. They are also used on the Linia Hutnicza Szerokotorowa and in industrial and sand haulage around Katowice.

Upgraded units are still being used in Lithuania in 2021; LTG Cargo operates an upgraded TEM2UM-1000 (TEM2) shunting locomotive. The work involved upgrading the underframe of the unit and installing new components, including a 900 kW C32 Caterpillar diesel engine, EMIT main and auxiliary generators, a new Airpol SK30 compressor, and a remote fuel metering system. The unit also had new control circuit wires and power cables and video surveillance cameras installed. Cab upgrades include a new control panel, a new chair, HVAC system, and ultraviolet lamp for disinfection of frequently touched surfaces. The upgraded unit offers a 30% reduction in fuel usage and comes at 60% of the cost of a new locomotive.
