= Penzadieselmash =

Engine manufacturer in Penza, Russia

- Industry: Engineering
- Founded: 8 November 1948
- Headquarters: Penza, Russia
- Products: Diesel engines, turbochargers, pumps, flexible couplings
- Revenue: $38.3 million (2017)
- Operating income: $1.53 million (2017)
- Net income: $194,608 (2017)
- Total assets: $17.5 million (2017)
- Total equity: $3.56 million (2017)
- Owner: Transmashholding
- Website: www.pdmz.ru/en/index.html

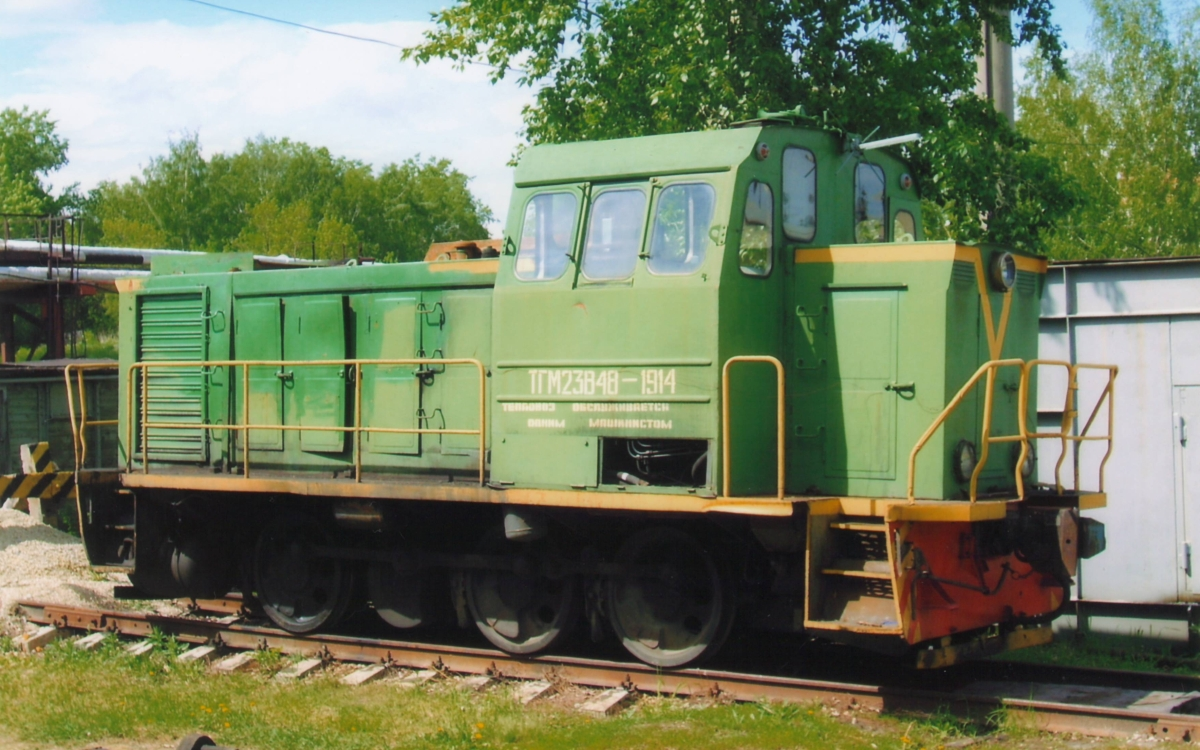

Penzadieselmash (Penza diesel plant) is a Russian industrial enterprise, manufacturing diesel engines and diesel generators both for locomotives and ships and related products. It was founded in 1948 and is now (2015) part of the Transmashholding group.

== Products ==
Products include diesel engines, turbochargers and spare parts for these. Also water and oil pumps and flexible couplings. Penza engines have been widely used in Russian diesel locomotives including classes TE2 (ТЭ2), TEM1 (ТЭМ1), TEM2 (ТЭМ2) and TEM3 (ТЭМ3) and marine engines and generators.

== Engines ==
- PD-1A 1D and 4A, from D-50, local ALCO Fairbanks FM 539T, D50 D55 engines

naval engines and generators, ° D-50S ° 5D50 ° 5Д50М/6ChN 31,8/33-1, 4D50 diesel generator

- D-200 V4 V6 V8 from 500 kW to 1500, V12
- D-400 V12 turbodiesel
- Wartsila, B&W
