= Soviet locomotive class TE1 =

Diesel locomotive produced in the Soviet Union

TE1 (ТЭ1)
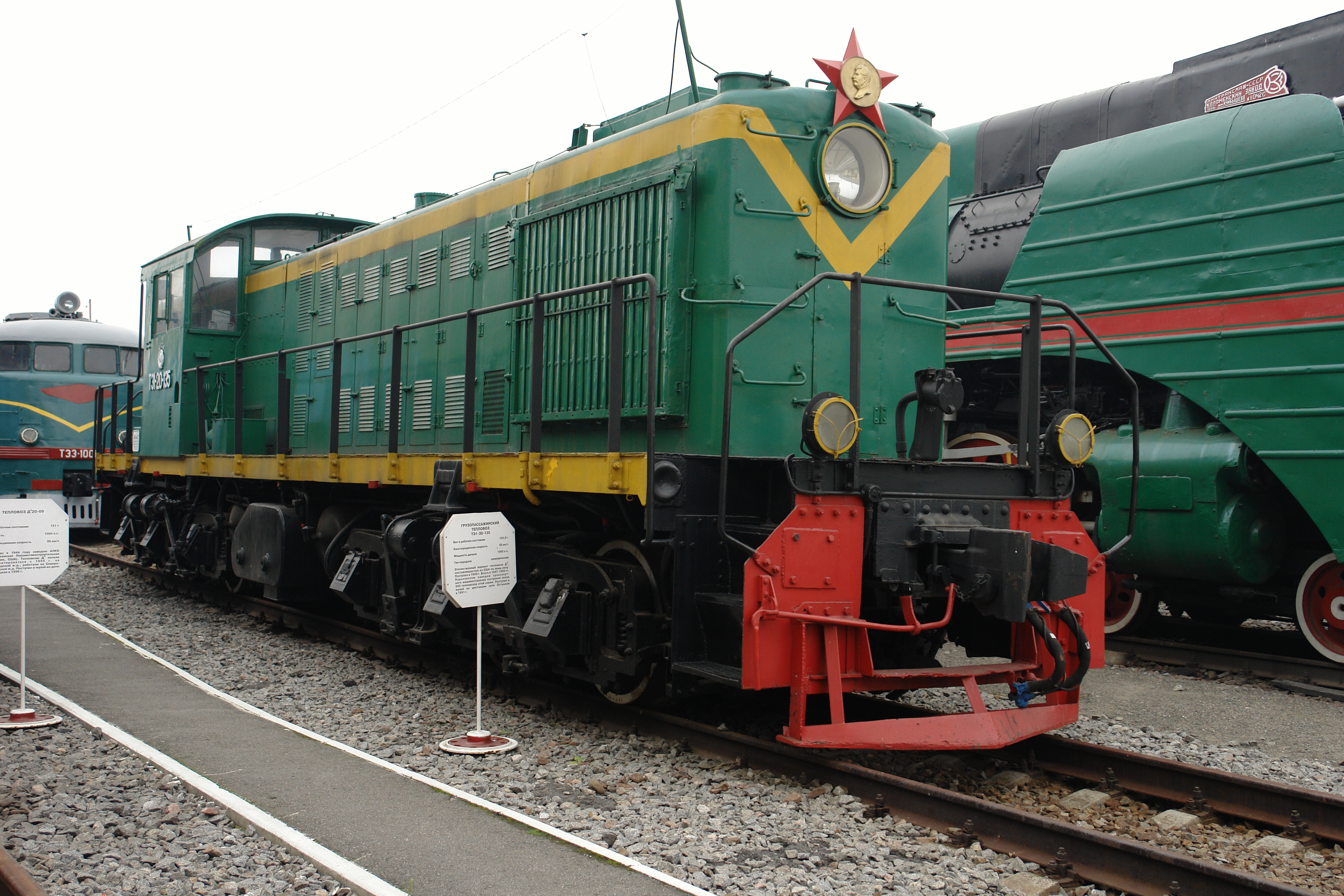
- TE1-20-135 in the museum in St. Petersburg
Type and origin
- Power type: diesel
- Builder: Malyshev Factory, Kharkiv
- Build date: 1947–1950
- Total produced: 298
Specifications
- Configuration
  - UIC: Co′Co′
- Wheel diameter: 1,014–1,050 mm (39.9–41.3 in) (early/late)
- Length: 16,892 mm (665.0 in)
- Width: 3,121 mm (122.9 in)
- Height: 4,251 mm (167.4 in)
- Axle load: 20 t (20 long tons; 22 short tons)
- Service weight: 123.9 t (121.9 long tons; 136.6 short tons)
- Fuel capacity: 5,150 kg (11,350 lb)
- Engine type: D50
- Traction motors: diesel
- Transmission: electric
- Train heating: none
- Train brakes: pneumatic
Performance figures
- Maximum speed: 90–93 km/h (56–58 mph) (early/late)

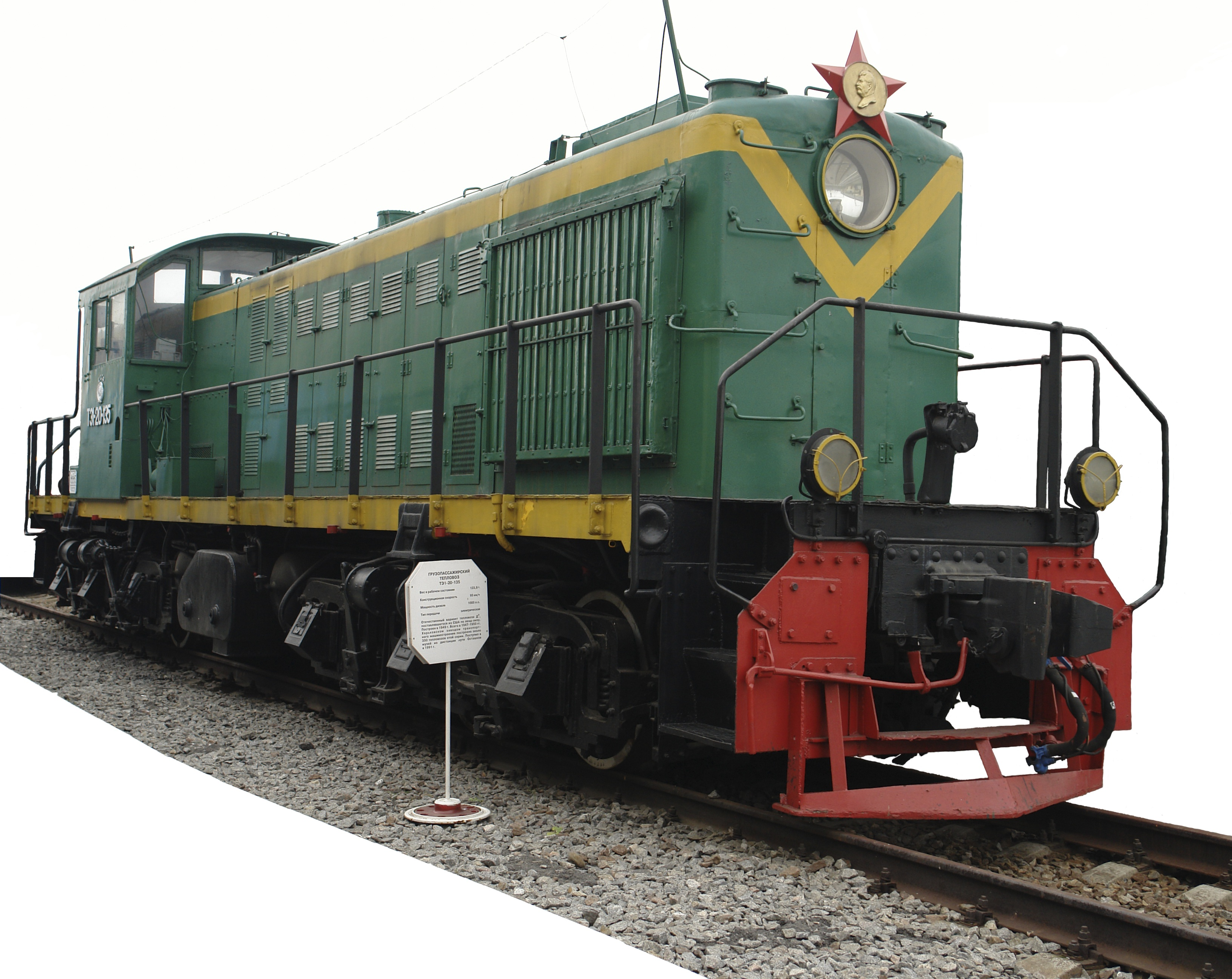
Model of the TE1-20-135 locomotive on a white background

TE1 (Russian: ТЭ1) is a diesel locomotive with electric transmission, produced in the Soviet Union from 1947 to 1950 by the Malyshev Factory in Kharkiv. It is a modified copy of the American ALCO RSD-1. Initially designated as TE1-20, a total of 298 units were produced, of which 16 were converted to gas generator drive under the designation TE1^{G}.

== History ==
=== Origin ===
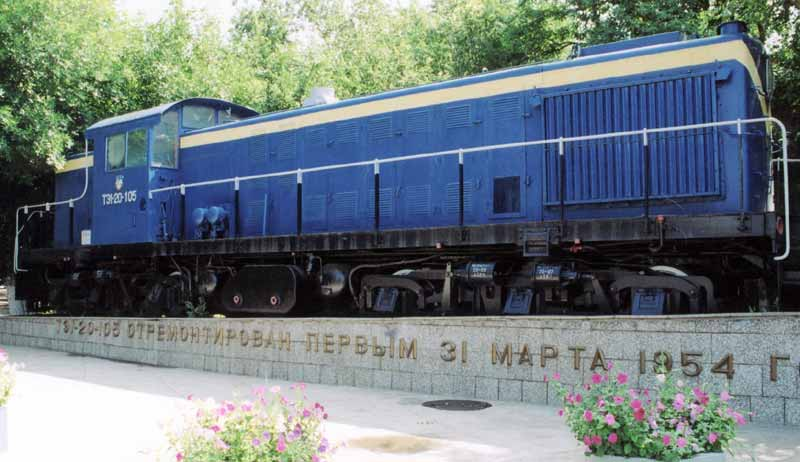
TE1-20-105

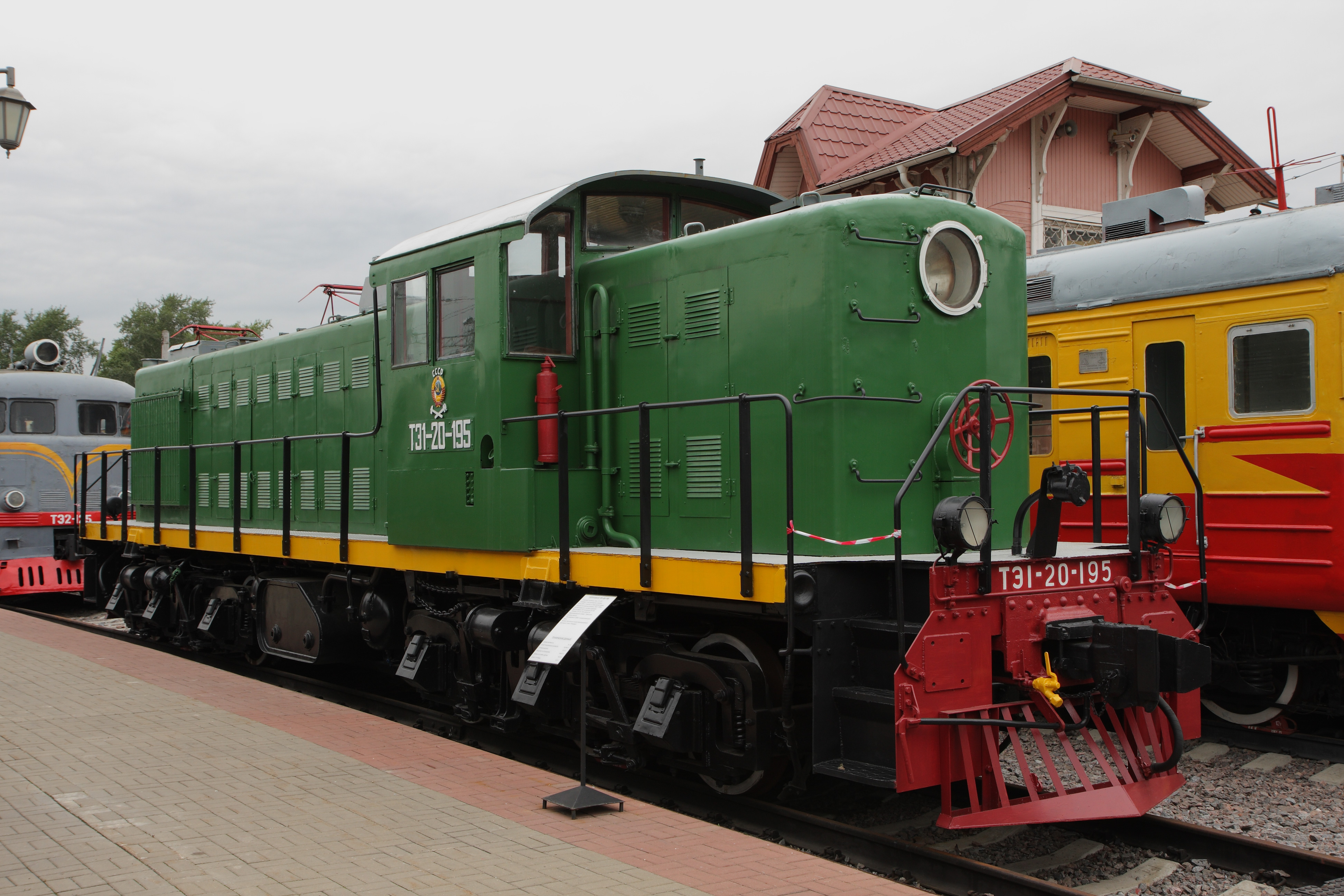
TE1-20-195 from the back

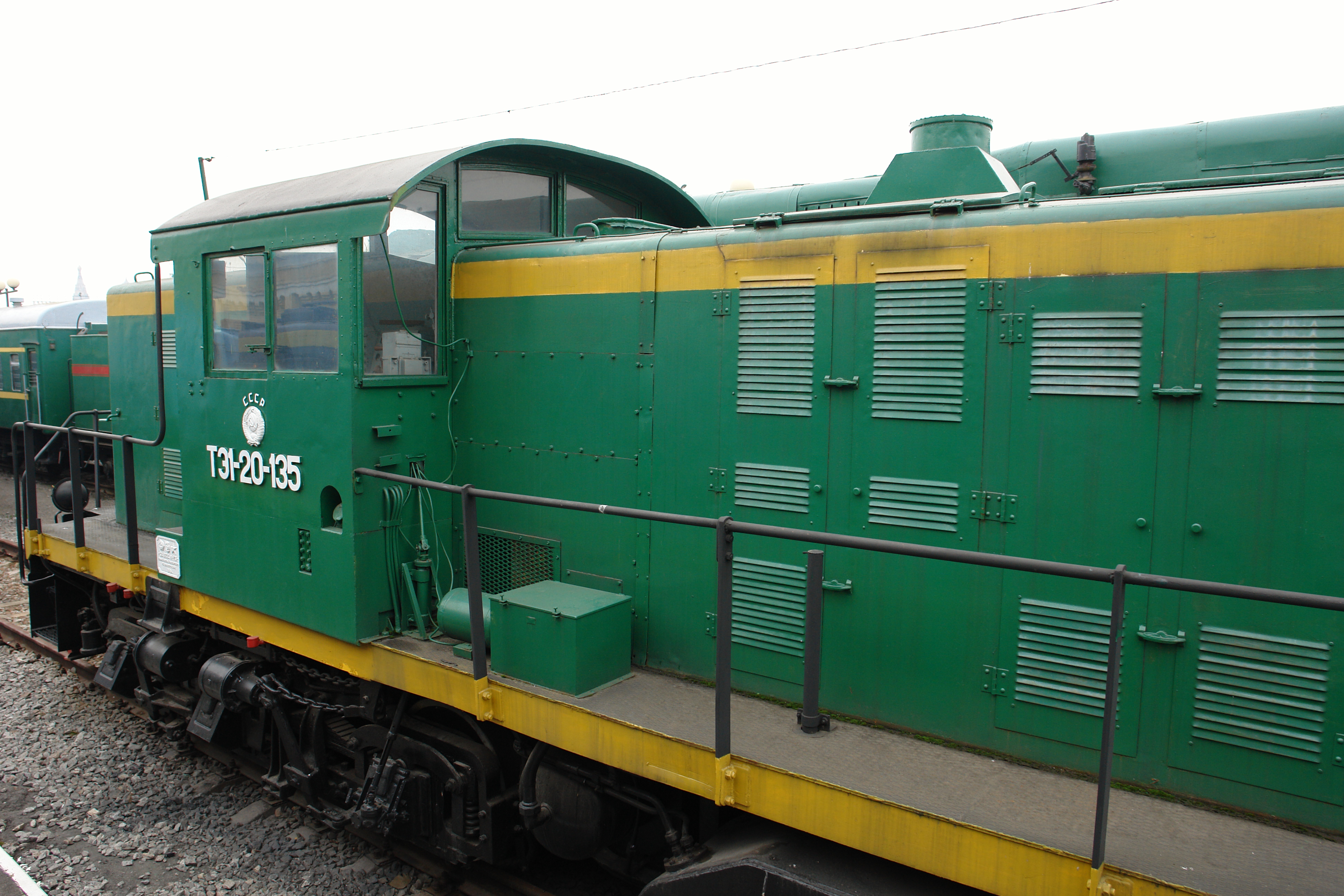
Cabin of TE1-20-135

Before World War II, diesel traction in the Soviet Union was poorly developed, with only a small number of diesel locomotives intended for line service, which were already outdated and had construction deficiencies by the 1940s. (Note: In the Soviet Union, only 29 diesel locomotives for line service were built by 1941, along with 4 additional units ordered from Germany; the largest series was E^{EŁ} (28 units, plus 18 more as mobile power generators). In addition, numerous low-power shunting locomotives were in operation (Rakov (1995, pp. 356, 367, 524)).) However, at the end of the war, in 1945, the Soviet Union received 68 modern American ALCO RSD-1 locomotives through Lend-Lease military assistance, designated in the Soviet Union as the D^{A} series (originally D^{A}20, Russian: ДA20). The locomotive was recognized as successful, and on 7 August 1945, during a meeting with Stalin on Railway Workers' Day, a government decision was made to copy its design. (Note: The choice of the D^{A}20 locomotive as a model was influenced by Stalin's personal interest in this type of locomotive, which had pulled his train to the Potsdam Conference, and the positive assessment expressed by the engineer (Rakov (1995, p. 374)).) It was decided to place the production of locomotives in the former Kharkov Locomotive Factory, renamed to the Malyshev Factory. The necessary specialists in diesel locomotive construction were gathered at the plant, and a sample locomotive D^{A}20-52 was provided for reference. The chief designer was M. Shchukin.

The design of the locomotive was adapted to Soviet standards and the metric system. The wheel diameter was changed from 1,016 mm (40 inches) to 1,014 mm, and from locomotive number 122, to 1,050 mm (according to other sources, from number 124). The Soviet braking system with a Matrosov system distributor replaced the Westinghouse system, and a larger capacity battery (550 Ah instead of 360 Ah) was used. The rotational speeds of the engine at middle positions (from 2 to 6) of the eight-position controller were slightly increased. The weight of the locomotive increased by nearly 3 tons, from 121 to 123.9 tons. The development and initial production of traction motors were handled by the Moscow Dynamo plant, while the generator was produced by the Kharkiv Electromechanical Plant. From 1949, the production of all electrical equipment was taken over by the Kharkiv Diesel Electric Equipment Plant.

=== Production ===
The first locomotive was produced in March 1947. Initially, these were designated as the TE1-20 series (Russian: ТЭ1-20, where T stands for tieplovoz – diesel locomotive, E – with electric transmission, type one, and 20 – axle load in tons). By the end of production in 1950, locomotives with numbers from TE1-20-001 to 300 were produced; however, a total of 298 units of the TE1 series were actually made, as locomotives numbered 31 and 32 were produced as the TE5 series.

==== Production summary ====
Year	Number of units	Numbers
1947	25	001 – 025
1948	66	026 – 030, 033 – 093
1949	127	094 – 220
1950	80	221 – 300

=== Operation ===
The TE1 locomotives initially entered mainline service on railways in the southern regions of the Soviet Union: on the Ordzhonikidze Railway (Gudermes depot), the Ashgabat Railway (Ashgabat depot), as well as on the Ryazan-Ural Railway, later expanding to other lines. From 1948, they were used to operate passenger traffic on the Moscow–Kursk railway line. Most remained in service until the 1980s.

== Variants and derivative designs ==
=== TE5 ===
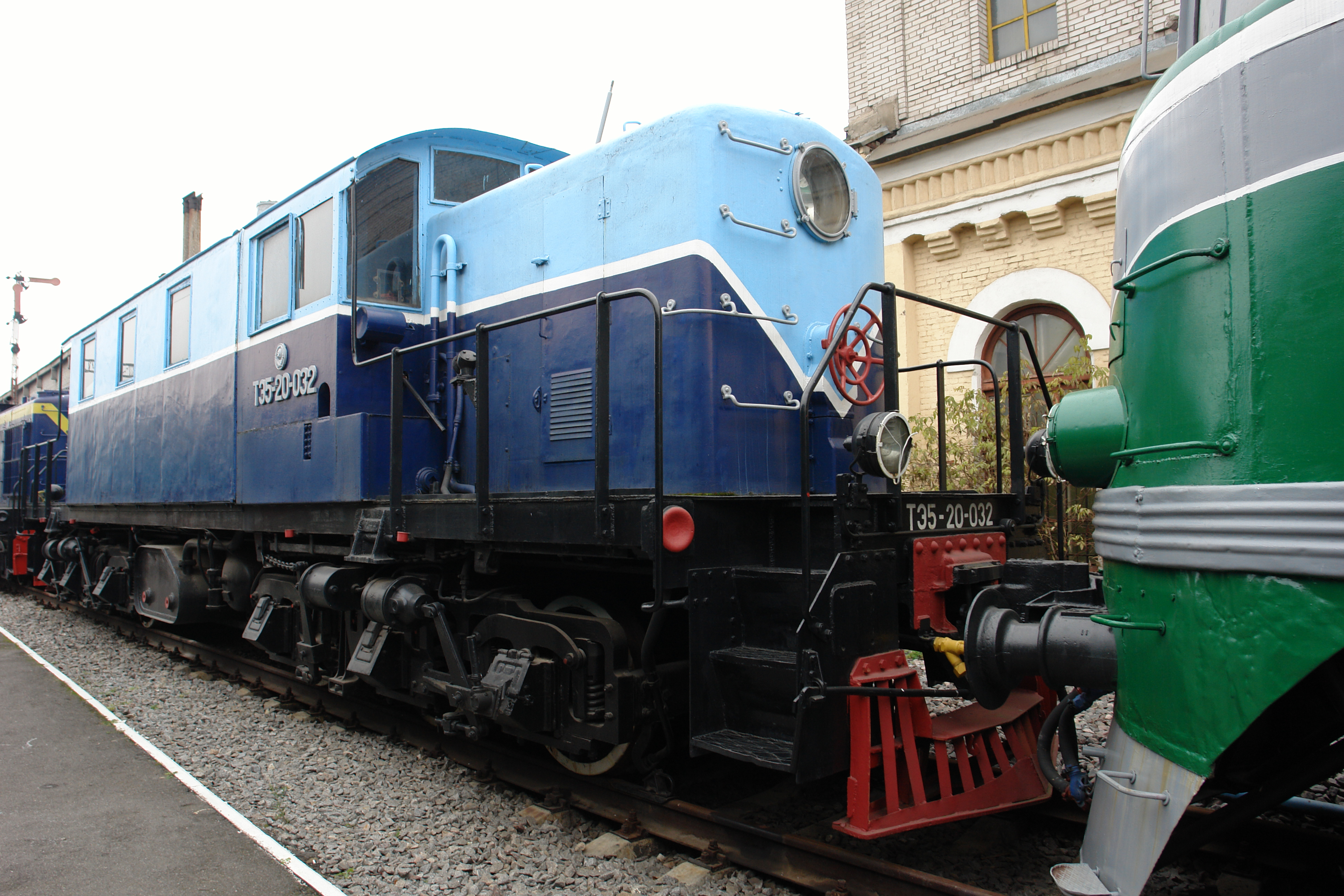
TE5-20-032

A variant of the TE1 series locomotive was the TE5 series, two units of which – numbered 31 and 32 – were built in 1948 within the TE1 series. These units differed by featuring an extended cab that spanned most of the locomotive's length, including the engine and generator, for improved thermal insulation, designed for operation in cold regions.

=== TE1^{G} ===
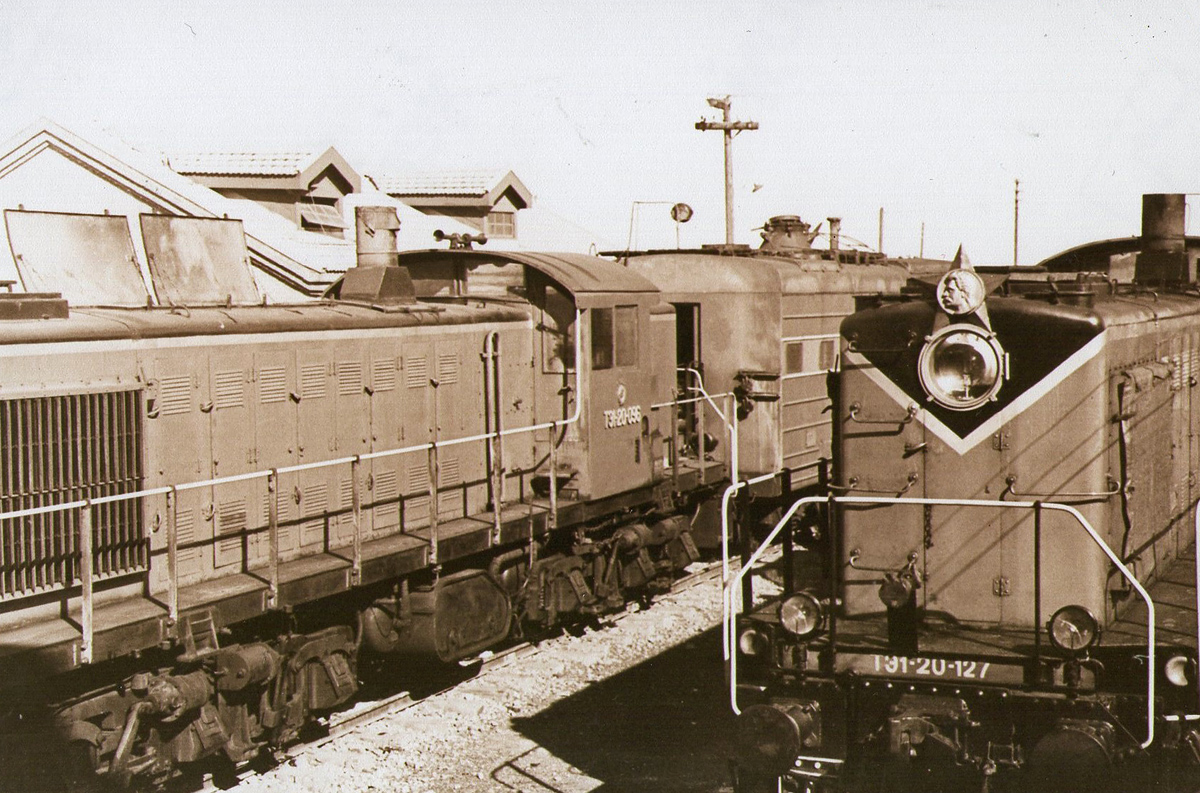
Gas generator-powered TE1^{G} locomotives on trials in China

Based on prior research in this area, the All-Union Scientific Research Institute of Railway Transport designed a modified version of the TE1 diesel locomotive with a gas generator, intended to operate on mixed fuel (diesel and anthracite). This locomotive was designated as TE1^{G} (ТЭ1^{Г}); according to some sources, it was labeled TEG (ТЭГ). In 1950, locomotive no. 187 was rebuilt accordingly. Besides the engine modification, it was equipped with a four-axle tender (on two trucks) housing the gas generator. The tender's length was 12,100 mm, with a wheel diameter of 950 mm; the combined service weight of the locomotive with the tender was 194 tons. At the end of 1951, the locomotive entered experimental service on the Volga Railway. In 1952, five additional locomotives (nos. 114, 146, 176, 209, and 210) were converted in this way at the Ulan-Ude repair shops, with ten more following in 1954 (including nos. 90–96). These units operated out of the Verkhniy Baskunchak depot on the Volga Railway. Fuel oil consumption during operation was 35–40% of that of conventional TE1 units. However, these locomotives proved not entirely successful, as coal dust in the gas led to accelerated corrosion of the pipes and wear of the engines. Consequently, by the late 1950s, most units were either decommissioned or converted to operate solely on diesel. In 1959, two TE1^{G} locomotives underwent testing on Chinese railways, with one subsequently being purchased. The program for developing gas-generator diesel locomotives was discontinued due to increased availability of liquid fuels in the Soviet Union.

=== Derivative designs ===
The main components of the TE1, especially the D50 engine and electrical equipment, including traction motors, were used in the construction of the dual-section TE2 locomotive with a Bo'Bo'+Bo'Bo' axle configuration, built by the Malyshev Factory, with a total of 528 units produced between 1948 and 1955.

A close successor to the TE1, with a similar design, was the TEM1 shunting locomotive produced by the BMZ plant in Bryansk.

== Construction ==
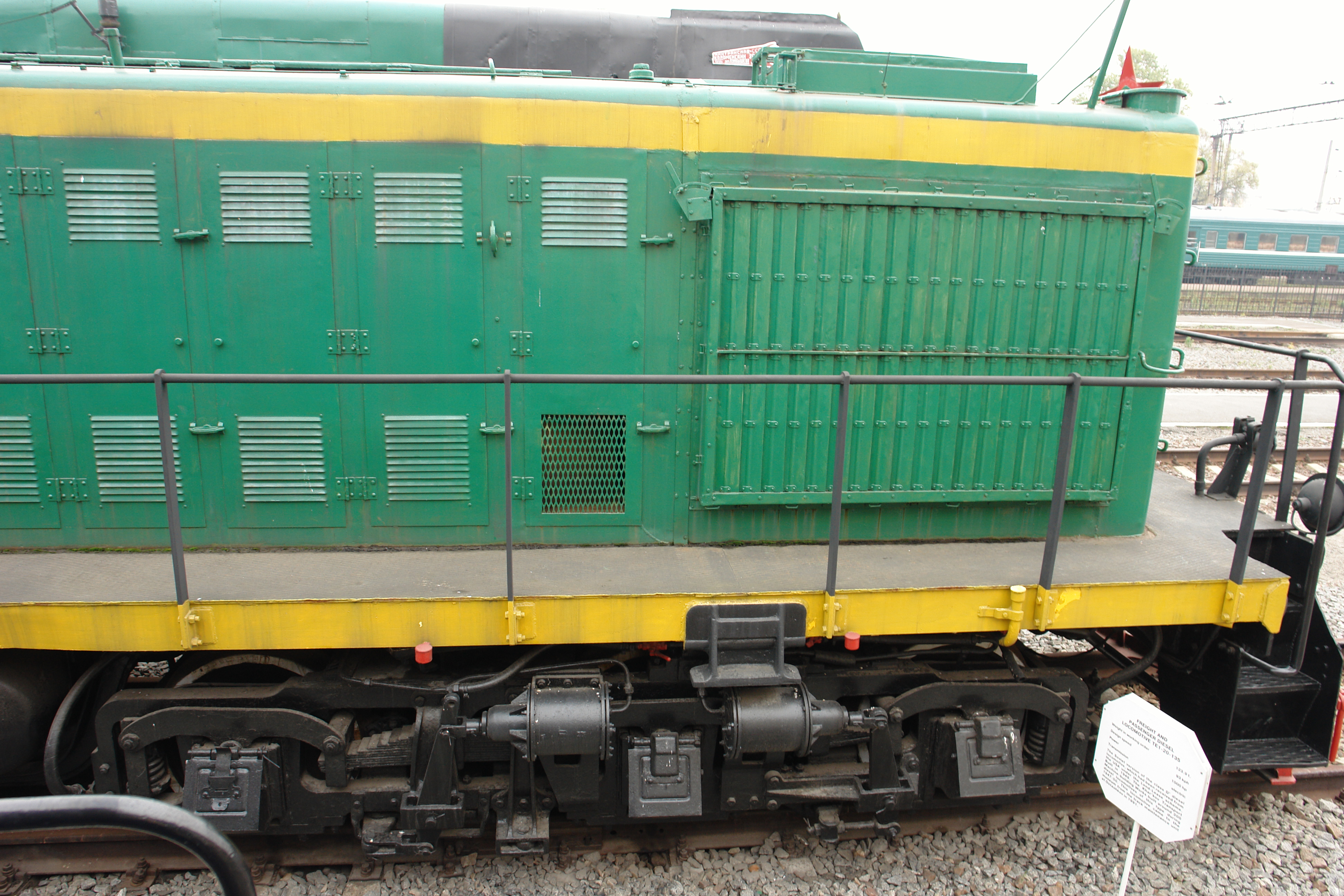
Front truck of the TE1 locomotive

The TE1 locomotive, like the D^{A} series, was built with a single-cab layout, featuring a central cab placed asymmetrically with a long engine compartment at the front and a short battery compartment at the rear. The cab extended over both compartments and had windows in its end walls; its side walls were vertical, and the roof was rounded on the sides. The engine and battery compartments were narrower than the cab, with inspection hatches on the sides that were not accessible during movement. Walkways with railings surrounded these compartments, with access steps at the corners of the locomotive. The cab doors could only be accessed from the walkways, with one located on the left side of the front and the other on the right side at the rear. Inside the cab, there was a round seat with a backrest for the engineer on the right side and a seat for the assistant on a toolbox. The cab was equipped with a heater. In the front part of the engine compartment, radiators were mounted with a fan on top, driven by the engine, and louvers on the side walls.

The frame was welded from two longitudinal rolled steel profiles connected by cross members, a pedestal for the generator set, and buffer beams at the ends. It rested on two bogies. The bogie frames consisted of two longitudinal beams joined by four cross members. The suspension consisted of coil springs at the bogie ends and leaf springs between the wheels. The axle spacing in the three-axle bogies was asymmetrical (1,905 mm for the inner and 1,525 mm for the outer), with a distance of 9,450 mm between bogie pivot points.

The locomotive was equipped with an electric transmission. A six-cylinder, four-stroke turbocharged diesel engine of the D50 type with an output of 1,000 hp was located at around one-third of the locomotive's length. The cylinder diameter was 318 mm, and the piston stroke was 330 mm (in the original American engine, these values were 317.5 mm by 330.2 mm). The engine displacement was 157.2 liters. The engine operated at speeds from 270 to 740 rpm, corresponding to the first and eighth positions of the controller. The engine shaft was coupled to the main generator, model MPT-84/39, with a power output of 620 kW (maximum voltage 900 V, current 1,150 A). The generator, located in the center of the locomotive, weighed 4,500 kg and also functioned as a starter motor. Additionally, the locomotive was equipped with an auxiliary generator with an MWT-25/9 exciter (power output 3.6 kW, voltage 55 V, current 65 A) and an MWG-25/11 auxiliary generator (power output 5 kW, 75 V), powering the locomotive's electrical system. A battery of 32 32TN-550 batteries provided 64 V and had a capacity of 550 Ah.

The six DK-304B traction motors each had a power output of 98 kW (voltage 157 V, current 725 A, 270 rpm). At low speeds, the motors were connected in series, switching automatically to a series-parallel mode (in groups of three motors) at 9–11 km/h, and field weakening engaged at 20–25 km/h. Similar to its American counterpart, the main generator reached full power at speeds up to 20–25 km/h, while a field excitation limiter restricted power to approximately 55% at 60 km/h, a characteristic more suited to shunting work.

The maximum speed was set at 90 km/h for locomotives with wheels of 1,014 mm in diameter and 93 km/h with wheels of 1,050 mm (from unit no. 122). The fuel capacity was 5,150 kg, with 320 kg of oil and 1,200 kg of sand for the sanding system. The fuel supply allowed for a range of 1,200 km.

== Bibliography ==
- Rakov, Vitalyi A. (1995). Łokomotiwy otieczestwiennych żeleznych dorog (1845-1955) Локомотивы отечественных железных дорог 1845-1955 [Locomotives of Domestic Railways 1845-1955] (in Russian). ISBN 5-277-00821-7.
- Shishkin, K.; Gurevich, A.; Stepanov, A.; Platonov, J. (1951). Sowietskije tiepłowozy Советские тепловозы [Soviet Diesel Locomotives] (in Russian). Archived from the original on 2013-09-01.
