= Soviet locomotive class TE3 =

Class of 6807 Soviet locomotives

TE3 diesel locomotive
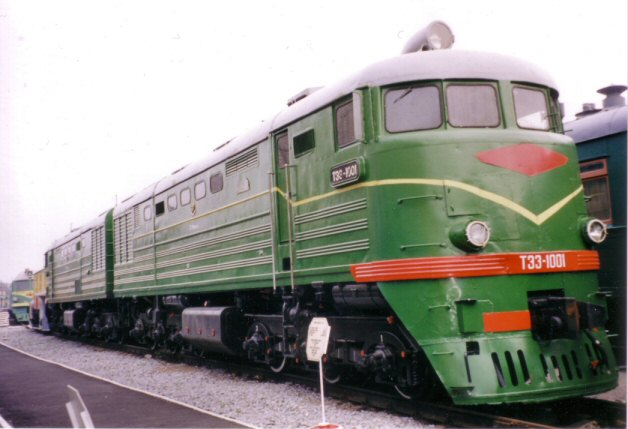
- TE3-1001 at St Petersburg railway museum in 2002
Type and origin
- Power type: Diesel-electric
- Builder: Kolomna Locomotive Works; Luhanskteplovoz; Kharkiv Locomotive Factory
- Build date: 1953-1973
Specifications
- Configuration
  - UIC: Co’Co’+Co’Co’
- Gauge: 1,520 mm (4 ft 11 27/32 in) Russian gauge
- Wheel diameter: 1,050 mm (41.34 in)
- Loco weight: 2 x 126 t (124 long tons; 139 short tons)
- Prime mover: 2 x Kharkiv 2D100
- RPM range: Max. 850 rpm
- Engine type: opposed-piston two-stroke diesel engines
- Transmission: Diesel-electric
Performance figures
- Maximum speed: 100 km/h (62 mph)
- Power output: Engine: 2 x 1,470 kW (1,970 hp; 2,000 PS)
Career
- Number in class: 6808 pairs 13,617 units
- Numbers: 001—598; 1001—1404; 2001—7805

The ТE3 (Russian: ТЭ3; Ukrainian: ТЕ3) is a Soviet diesel-electric locomotive, built in Russia and Ukraine to 1520 mm gauge. It is a two-unit Co’Co’+Co’Co’ machine. Total diesel power is 2,940 kW (3,940 hp; 4,000 PS). They were built from 1953 to 1973.

== Powertrain ==
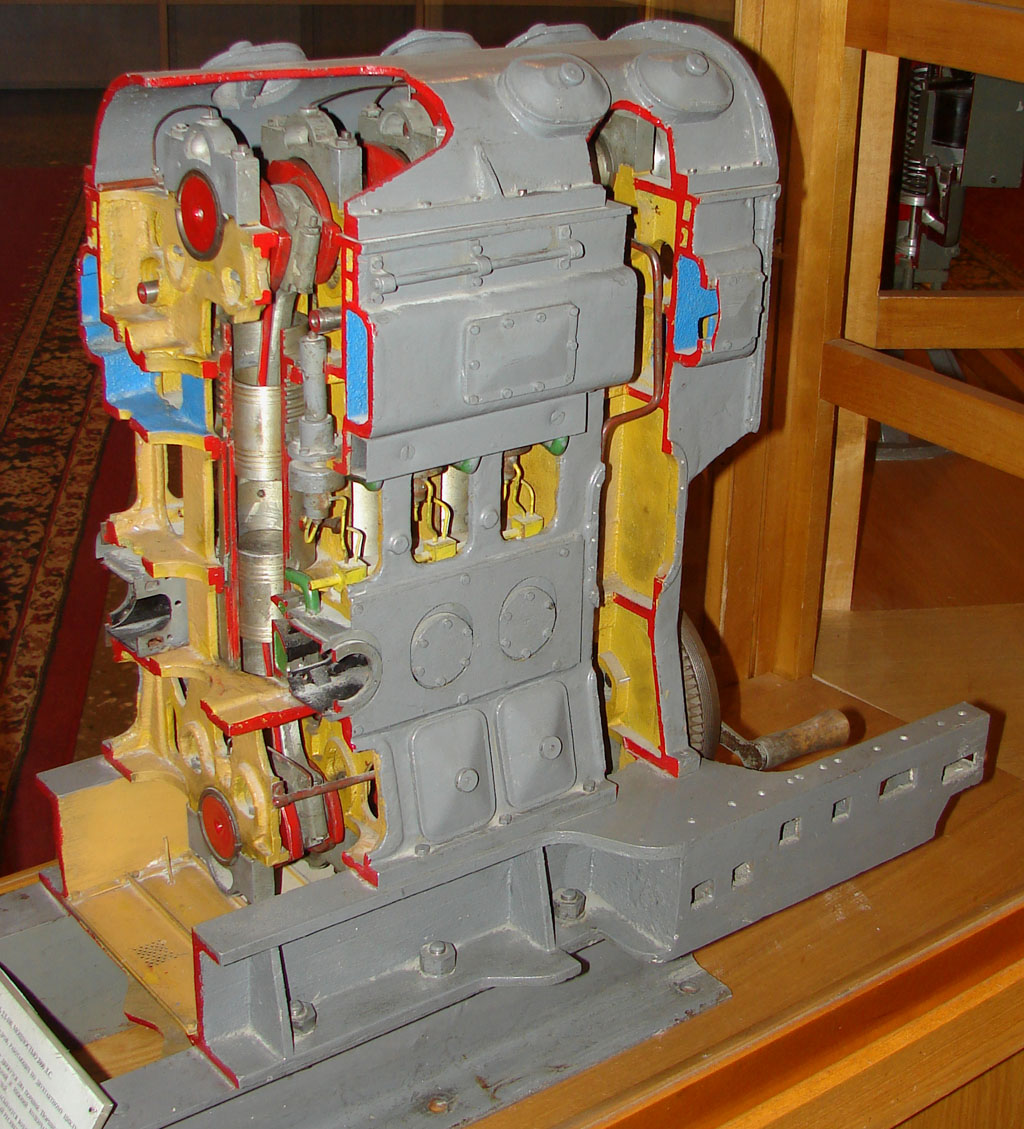
Cutaway 2D100 engine on display

The TE3 is powered by two Kharkiv 2D100 prime movers. Power output of each engine is 1,470 kW (1,970 hp; 2,000 PS). Transmission is diesel electric.

== Numbering ==
Each pair of locomotives was numbered: 001–598, 1001–1404, 2001–7805, making a total of 6807 pairs or 13,614 units. The information box shows 6808 pairs and 13,617 units. The reason for the discrepancy is not known. Possibly 3 spare units were built to cover for failures.
