= ALCO RSD-1 =

Class of 150 American (later Soviet) 1000hp Co′Co′ diesel-electric locomotives

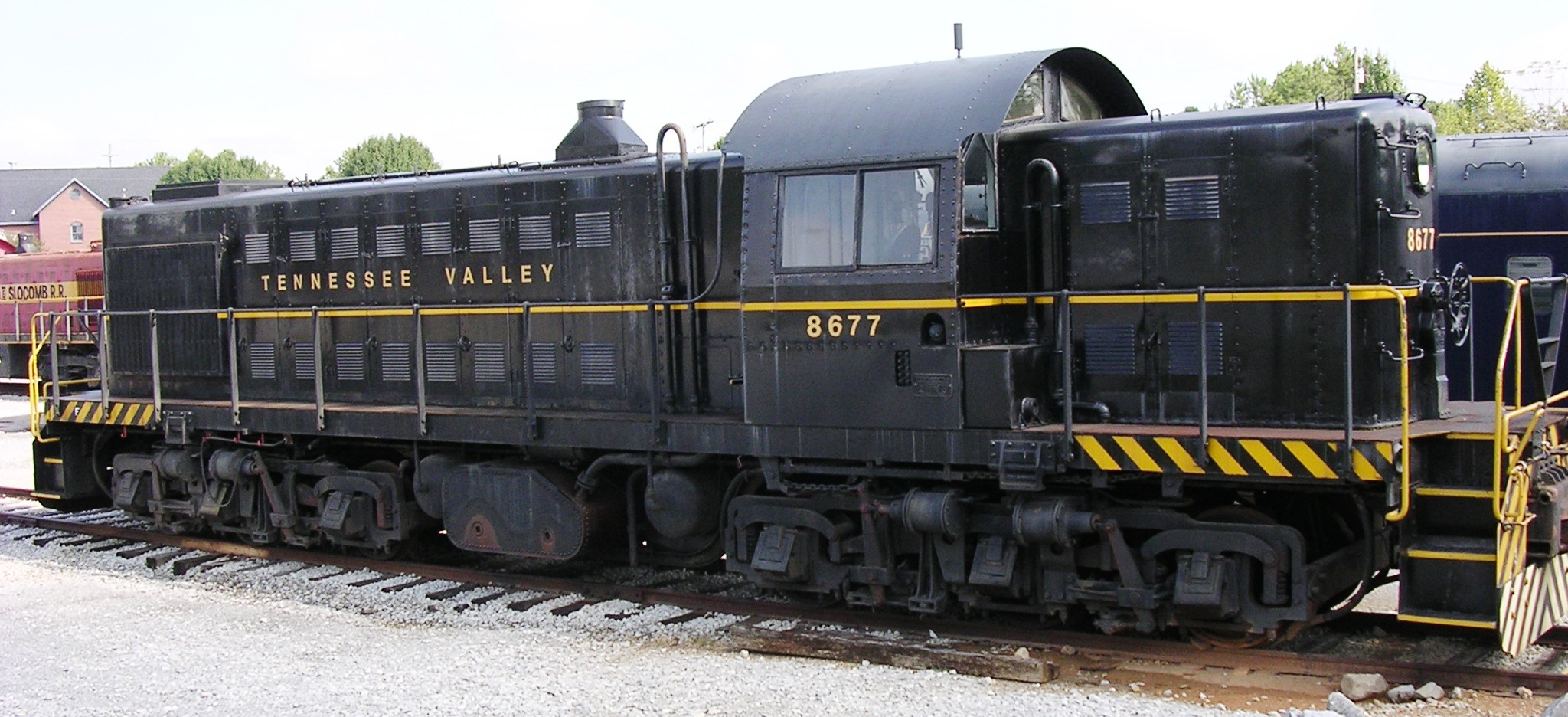
- Former US Army ALCO RSD-1, now owned by the Tennessee Valley Railroad Museum. Donated from the Eglin Air Force Base Railroad when that operation was abandoned.
Type and origin
- Power type: Diesel-electric
- Model: RSD-1
- Build date: November 1942 – May 1946
- Total produced: 163
Specifications
- Configuration
  - AAR: C-C
  - UIC: Co'Co'
- Gauge: 4 ft 8 1/2 in (1,435 mm) standard gauge 1,520 mm (4 ft 11 27/32 in) – Russia
- Length: 55 ft 5 3/4 in (16.91 m)
- Width: 10 ft 0 in (3.05 m)
- Height: 14 ft 5 in (4.39 m)
- Loco weight: 247,500 lb (112,300 kg)
- Fuel capacity: 1,000 US gal (830 imp gal; 3,800 L)
- Prime mover: ALCO 6-244T, 6-539T
- Engine type: Straight-6 Four-stroke diesel
- Aspiration: Turbocharger
- Displacement: 9,572 cu in (157 L)
- Generator: DC generator
- Traction motors: DC traction motors
- Cylinders: 6
- Cylinder size: 12 1/2 in × 13 in (318 mm × 330 mm)
- Transmission: Electric
- Loco brake: Straight air
- Train brakes: Air
Performance figures
- Maximum speed: 65 mph (105 km/h)
- Power output: 1,000 hp (750 kW)
- Tractive effort: 40,425 lbf (179,820 N)
Career
- Locale: North America, Soviet Union, Iran, North Korea

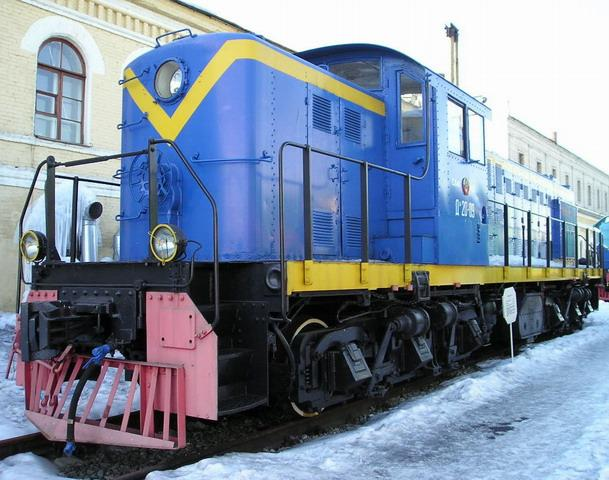
Former Soviet Railways Д^{а}20-09 (D^{A}20-09) on exhibit at the railway museum in former Varshavsky terminal -- Saint Petersburg, Russia. Originally built by ALCO as a model RSD-1 in 1944 and exported to the USSR.

The ALCO RSD-1 is a diesel-electric locomotive built by the American Locomotive Company (ALCO). This model was a road switcher type rated at 1,000 horsepower (750 kW) and rode on three-axle trucks, having a C-C wheel arrangement. It was often used in much the same manner as its four-axle counterpart, the ALCO RS-1, though the six-motor design allowed better tractive effort at lower speeds, as well as a lower weight-per-axle. It was developed to meet the need to supply the Soviet Union over the Trans-Iranian Railway starting in mid 1943. On the other hand, due to the traction generator and appurtenant control apparatus being sized for four axles and yet having two additional powered axles, it had poorer performance at higher speeds.

== Variations ==
There were three different specifications issued that covered the RSD-1 model; E1645 and E1646 were for wartime production for the US Army, while E1647 was a post-war order for the Mexican National Railways (Ferrocarriles Nacionales de México).

== Soviet Union ==
=== Alco locos ===
Seventy of the RSD-1s were shipped overseas to the Soviet Union in early 1945 during World War II, as part of the Allied war effort. They were classed there as the Soviet Railways Д^{A}20 (D^{A}20) class, also known just as Д^{А} after 1947 (D for Diesel, A for Alco and 20 for axle load in tons). They were used in ordinary line service rather than shunting, especially in southern parts of the Soviet Union (Turkmenistan), where water for steam locomotives was scarce. These locomotives were also used on the Trans-Iranian Railway. The Soviets subsequently kept many of the RSD-1s after the war, adopting the design to form the basis of their own line of diesel locomotives TE1, TEM1 and TEM2. Two RSD-1s were sunk en route to the Soviet Union when the ship they were on was torpedoed by a German U-boat (Д^{A}20-41 and Д^{A}20-50) and 68 were received. They entered service from March 1945, and some were still in service in the 1980s. The D^{A}20-27 hauled Stalin's train to Potsdam Conference, and its positive evaluation was among reasons to copy the design (the Soviet Union built only 51 diesel locomotives before the war, so it had not enough experience with designing).

=== Soviet locos ===
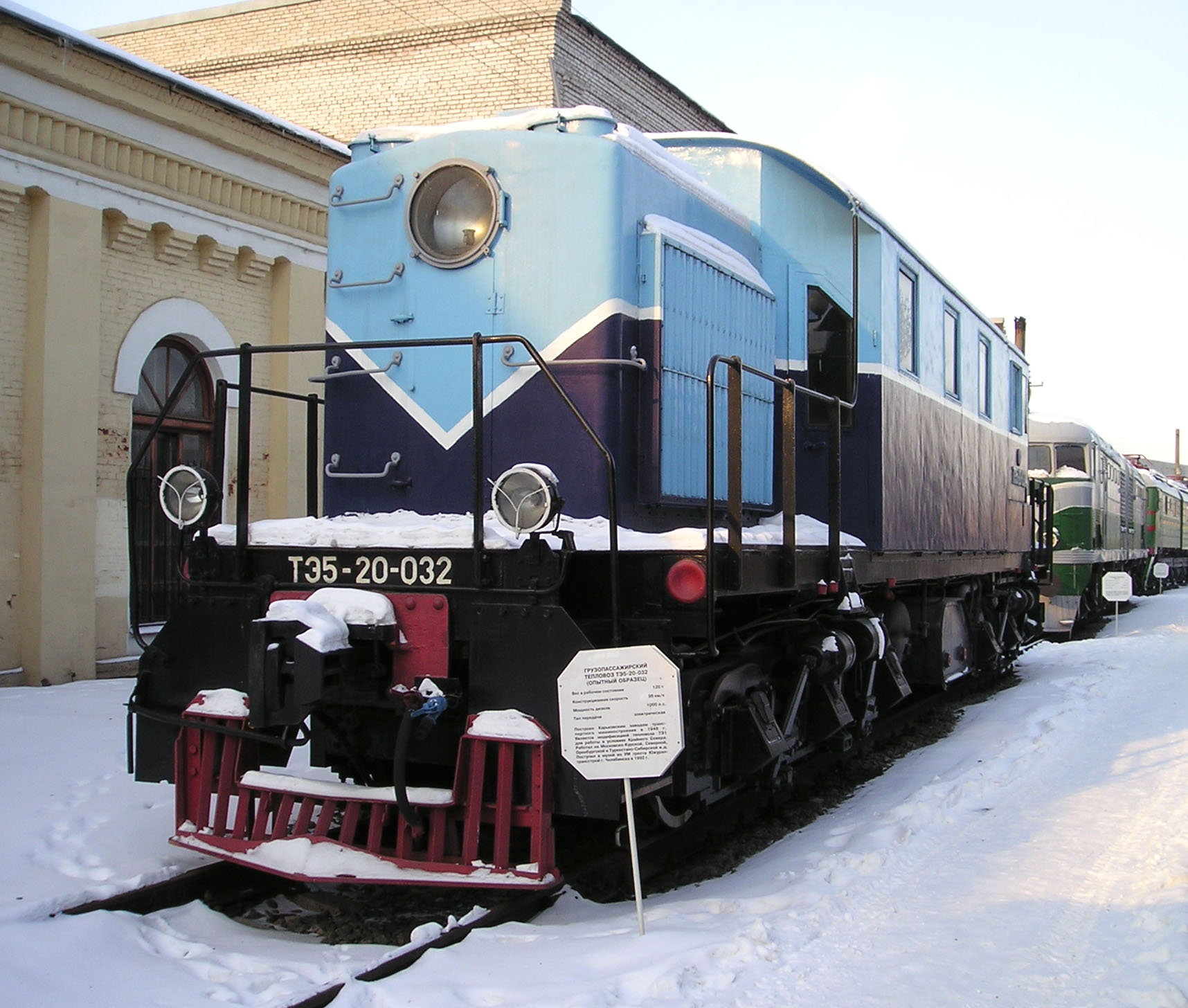
Diesel locomotive TE5-20-032 in the Railway Museum in Saint Petersburg, Russia

The Soviet-built TE1 (ТЭ1), initially designed TE1-20, was a reverse engineered copy of the Alco product, adapted to metric system and Soviet norms. They were almost identical, but locomotives after #TE1-20-122 had 1050 mm (41.34 inch), instead of 40 inch wheels (1016 mm). The designation meant T - teplovoz (diesel engine), E - electric transmission, model 1, 20 ton axle load. A production lasted from 1947 until 1950 and 300 were made (including 2 of TE5 class). The TE2 (ТЭ2) utilized engine and electric components of TE1, but was as a twin-unit version, with a wagon-type body and utilized two-axle bogies. The TE5 (ТЭ5) was a cold climate version of the TE1. The cab was extended for most of the locomotive to provide covered access to the engine and a boiler was added to keep the cab warm when the engine was not running. Only two (or five) TE5 were built, within TE1 series.

== US Army ==
The first 13 RS-1s were requisitioned by the US Army, returned to ALCO and rebuilt to RSD-1s #8000-8012 for use on the Trans Iranian Railroad. This effort was to supply the Soviet Union. See the RS-1 article for the identity of the first 13 RSD-1s.

== Original owners ==
=== Specification E1645 ===
Railroad	Quantity	Road numbers	Notes
United States Army	13	8000–8012	Persian Gulf Command, Iran
United States Army	44	8013–8056	8040 and 8045 rebuilt for Alaska Railroad as RF1 in October 1947, renumbered 1050A and 1050B

=== Specification E1646 ===
Railroad	Quantity	Road numbers	Notes
United States Army	30	8600–8629	to Soviet Railways Д^{а}20-1 to Д^{а}20-30
United States Army	11	8630–8640	lost in U-boat attack
United States Army	8	8641–8648	to Soviet Railways Д^{а}20-31 to Д^{а}20-38
United States Army	1	8649	lost in U-boat attack
United States Army	30	8650-8679	
United States Army	20	8680–8699	to Soviet Railways Д^{а}20-39 to Д^{а}20-58

=== Specification E-1641 ===
Railroad	Quantity	Road numbers	Notes
Ferrocarriles Nacionales de México	6	5700–5705	

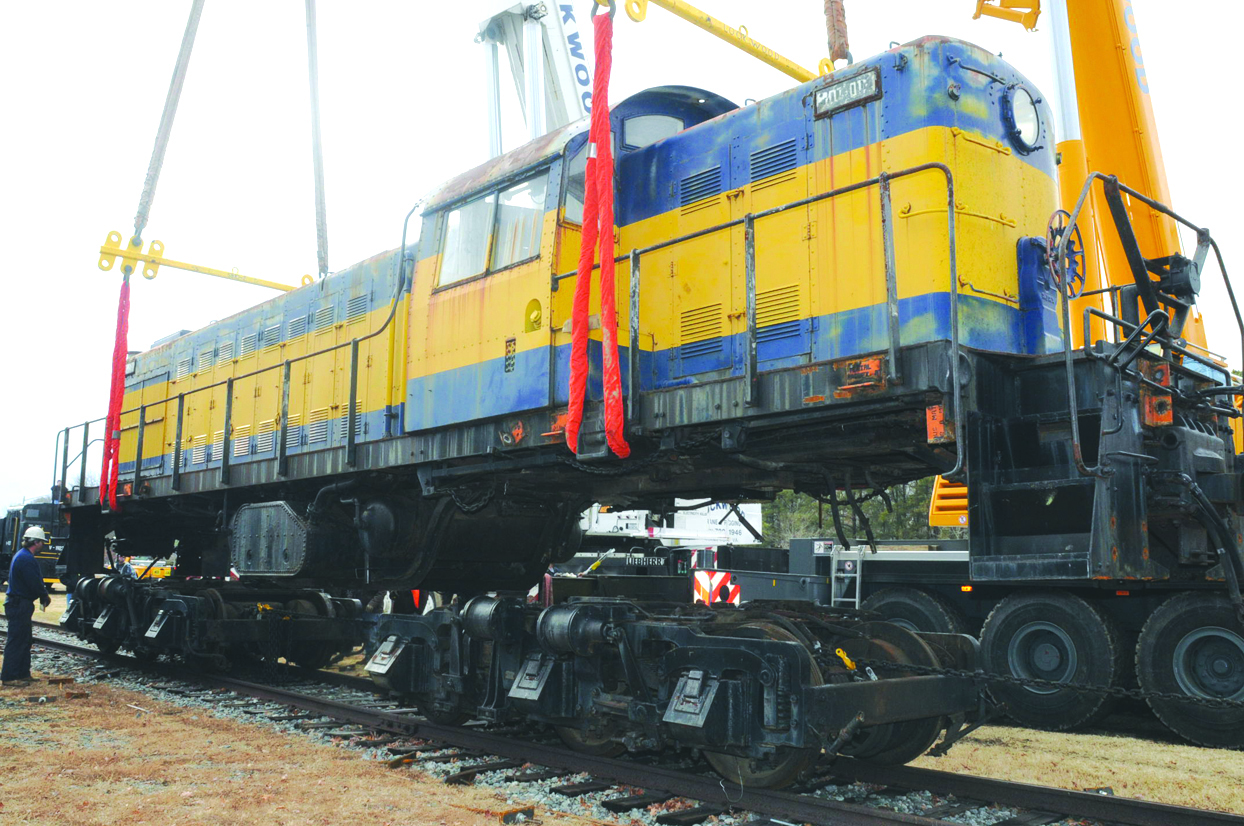
RSD-1 being delivered to the US Army Transportation Museum at Fort Eustis, seen in 2011

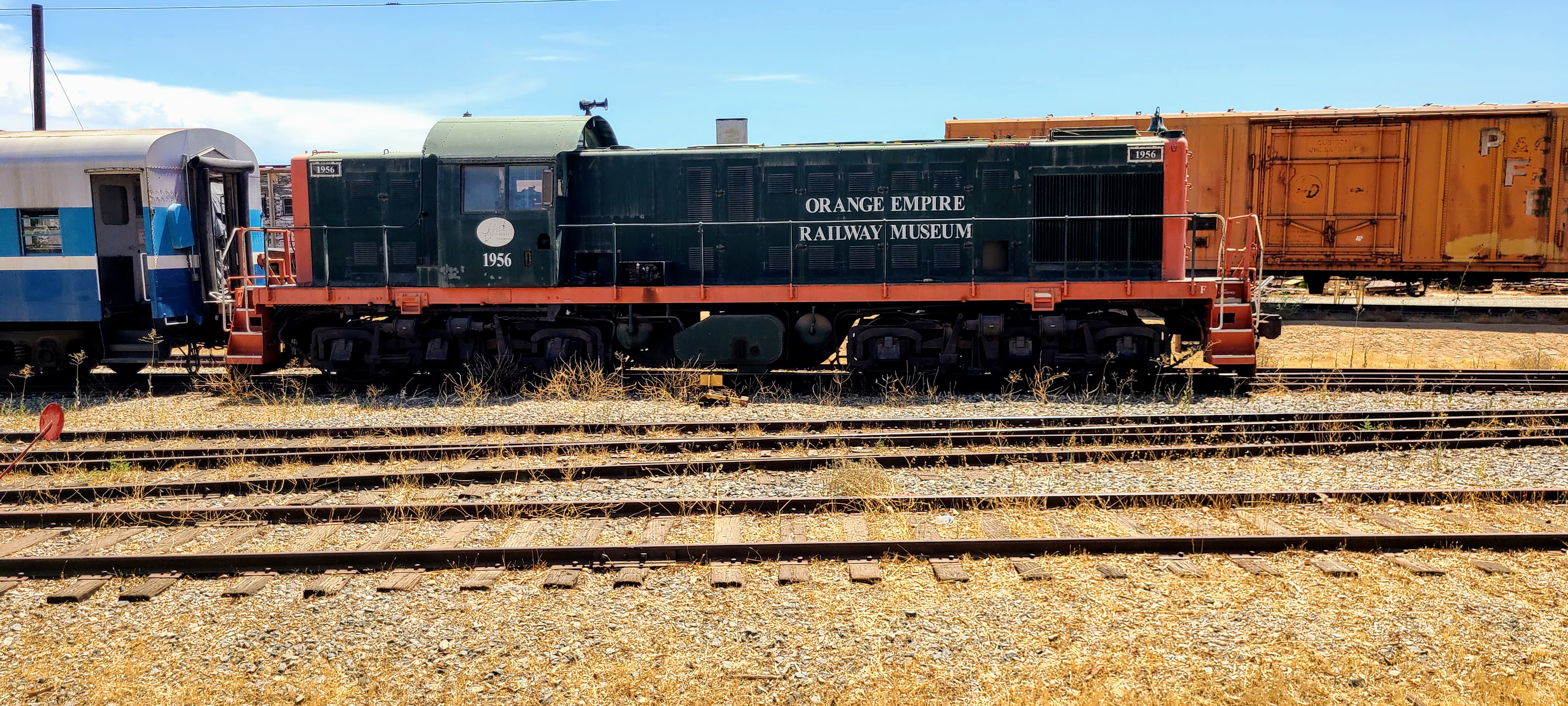
RSD-1 at the Southern California Railway Museum
