= Soviet locomotive class TE2 =

Class of Soviet Locomotive

TE2
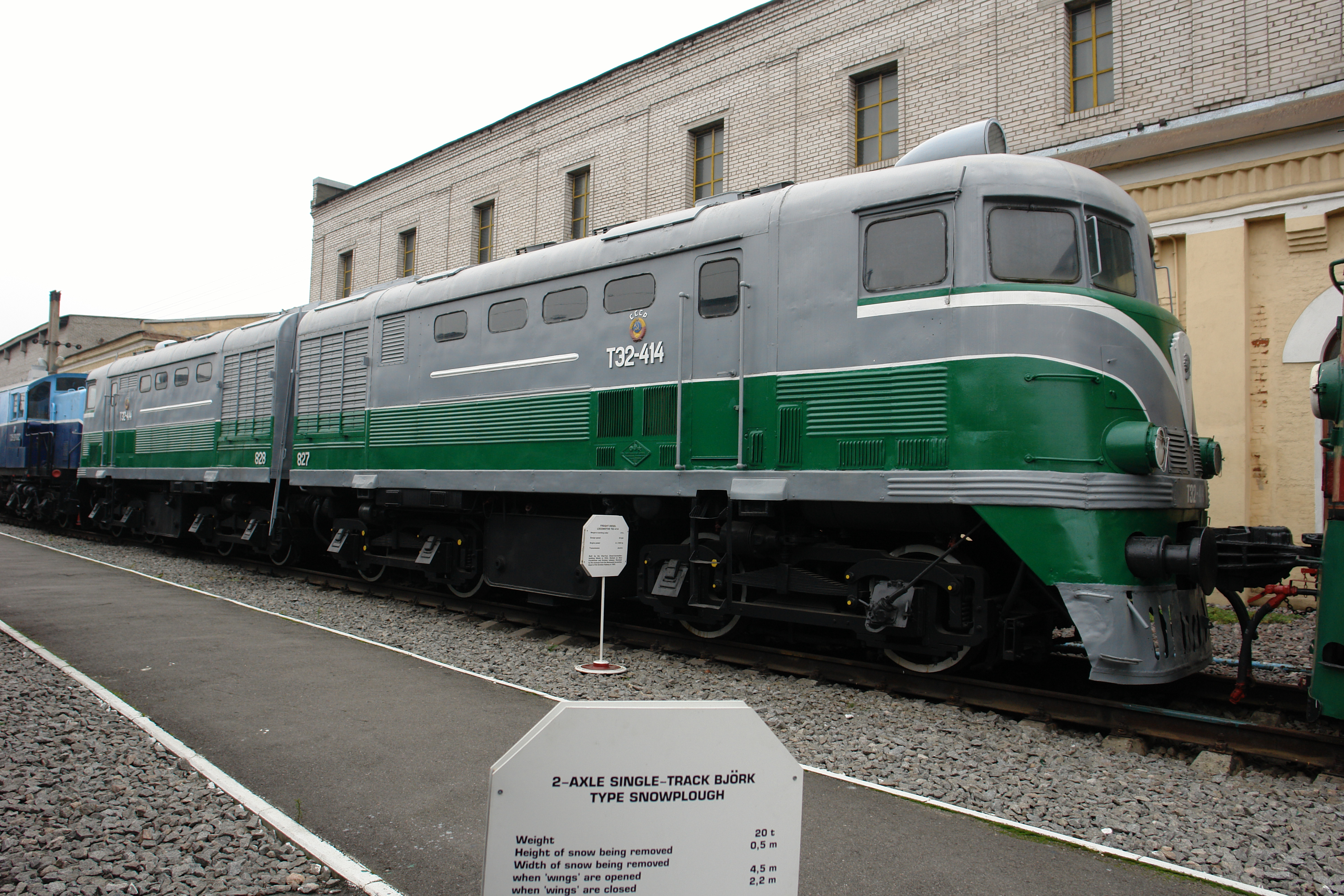
- TE2-414 at the Museum of Railway Technology, Saint Petersburg
Type and origin
- Power type: Diesel-electric
- Builder: Malyshev Factory, Kharkiv, Ukraine
- Build date: Prototypes: 1948-1949; Series-built: 1950-1955
Specifications
- Configuration
  - UIC: Bo-Bo+Bo-Bo
- Wheel diameter: 1,050 mm (41.34 in)
- Length: 2 x 11,948 mm (39 ft 2 3/8 in)
- Loco weight: 2 x 83.25 t (81.94 long tons; 91.77 short tons)
- Prime mover: 2 x Penza D50
- RPM range: Max. 740 rpm
- Engine type: 4-stroke 6 cylinder supercharged diesels
- Transmission: Diesel-electric; 8 x 152 kW d.c. traction motors Gear ratio 4.69:1
Performance figures
- Maximum speed: 93 km/h (58 mph)
- Power output: Diesel: 2 x 736 kW (987 hp; 1,001 PS)
- Tractive effort: 2 x 246 kN (55,000 lb_{f})
Career
- Number in class: 527; Numbers: 001-527

The TE2 (Russian: ТЭ2; Ukrainian: ТЕ2) is a class of Soviet diesel-electric locomotives built by Malyshev Factory in Kharkiv, Ukraine, from 1948 to 1955. It is nominally a two-unit version of the TE1, but is very different in appearance. While the TE1 is a Co-Co hood unit, the TE2 is a Bo-Bo+Bo-Bo cab unit.

== Powertrain ==
Each of the two units is powered by a 736 kW (987 hp; 1,001 PS) Penza D50 4-stroke 6 cylinder supercharged diesel engine and has four 152 kW (204 hp; 207 PS) DC traction motors.

== Production ==
Prototypes were built in 1948 and 1949 and series production ran from 1950 to 1955. A total of 528 pairs was built. Each pair carried a single number in the range 001 to 528.

== Preservation ==
A TE2-414 is preserved at the Museum of Railway Technology, Saint Petersburg.

== TE4 ==
The TE4 was an experimental modification of a TE2, designed to run on solid fuel by using a producer gas system. The gas generator was mounted on a four-axle non-powered unit, placed between the TE2 power units, making a wheel arrangement of Bo-Bo+2-2+Bo-Bo. It was not a success and was converted back to a TE2. See ТЭ4 at the Russian-language Wikipedia.

== TE6 ==
The TE6 was a class of sixteen TE2-type locomotives ordered by the Ministry of Defence in 1952. They were single-section and their purpose was to serve as locomotives or mobile alternating current generators. They were designed to "meet the requirements of protection against injury factors of a nuclear explosion". ТЭ6
