= Cutaway (industrial) =

Method of showing components of a product

A cutaway, in the industrial sense, refers to the display of a manufactured product, (an engine, a pump, a regulator, etc.) where a portion of the exterior housing has been removed to reveal the internal components, (pistons, bearings, seals, etc.) and their relationship to the functionality of the product.

Cutaways are typically used in product training, trade show environments, museum displays and for many additional applications. Cutaways are produced using a variety of methods by the manufacturer, by a cutaway service company, as mentioned above, or by an experienced machine shop.

While 3D modeling and CAD (computer-aided design) programs continue to improve and bring more features and benefits, the cutaway will continue to show the product as it appears in the real world, using actual parts and components to show relationships and functionality.

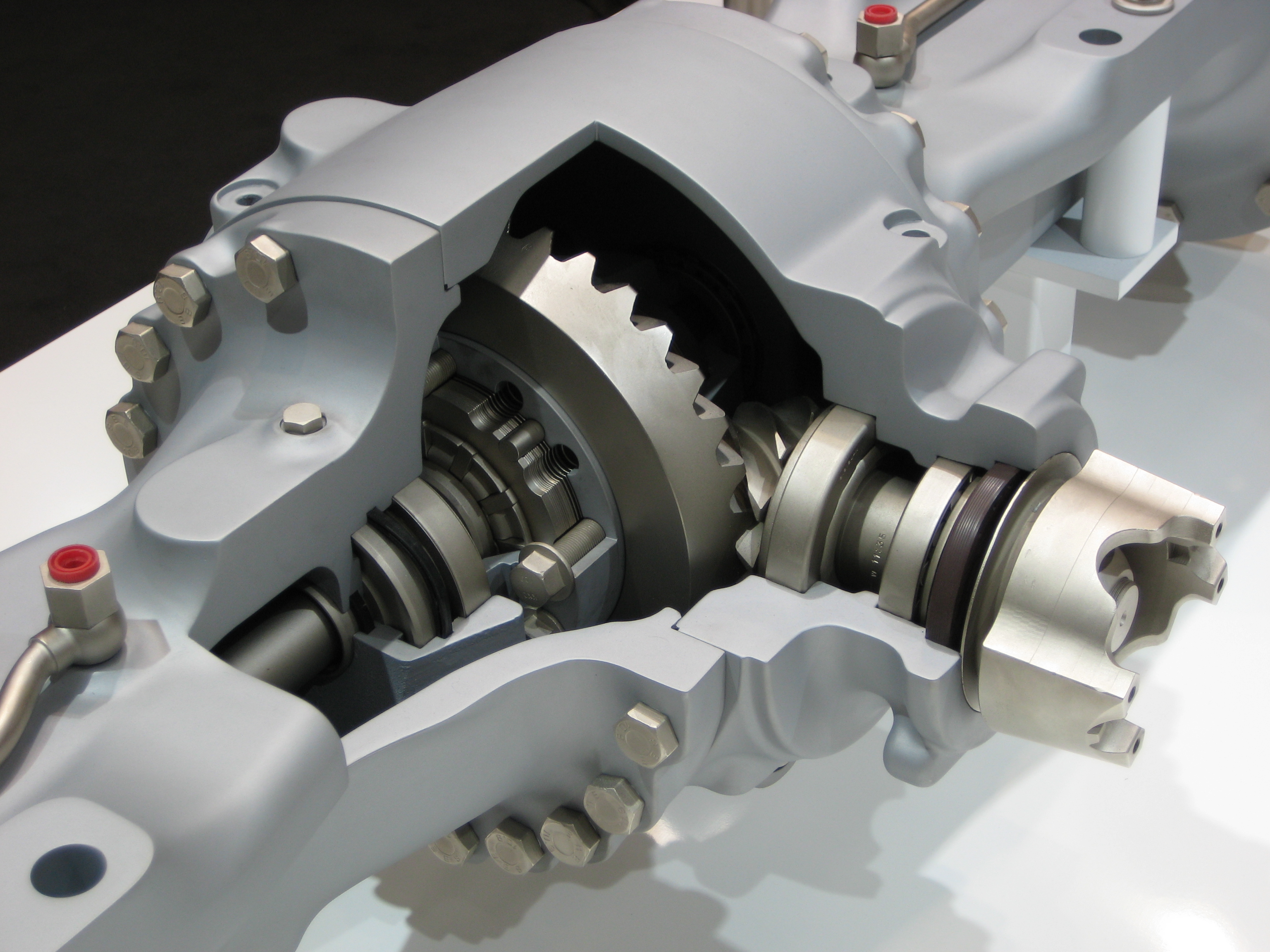
Cutaway of a limited-slip differential manufactured by ZF

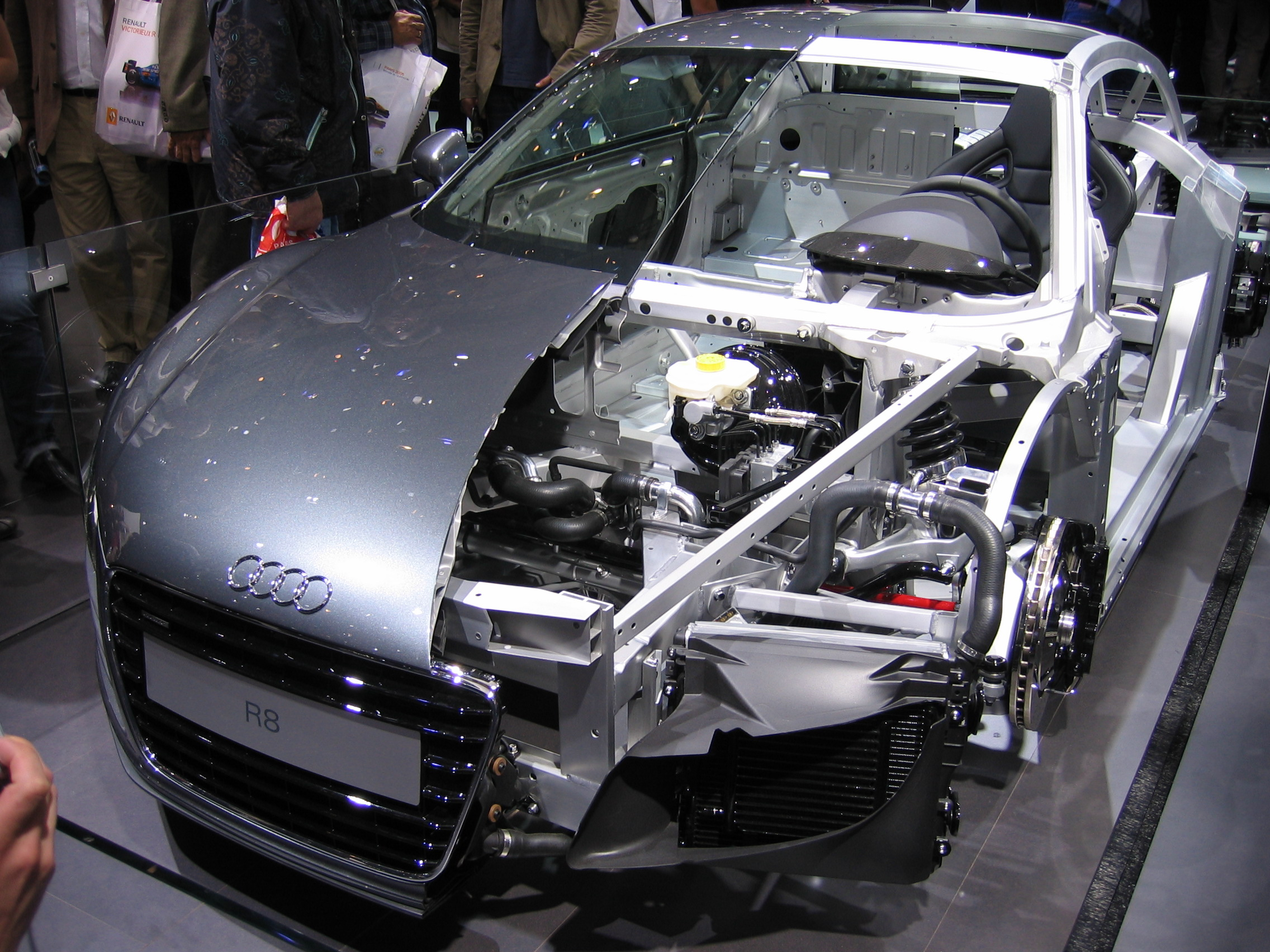
Cutaway of an Audi R8 4.2 V8 quattro coupe

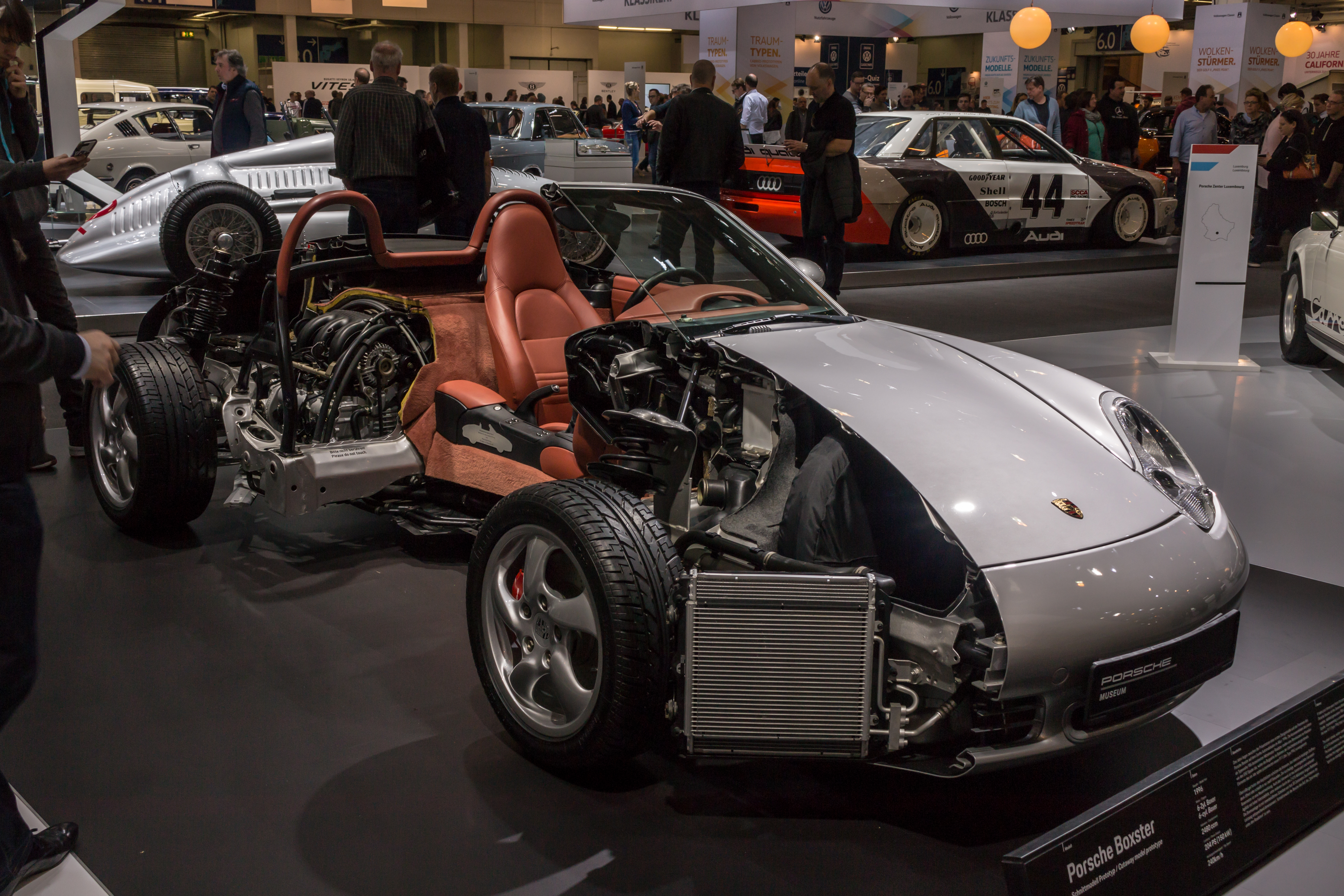
Cutaway of a Porsche 986 Boxster

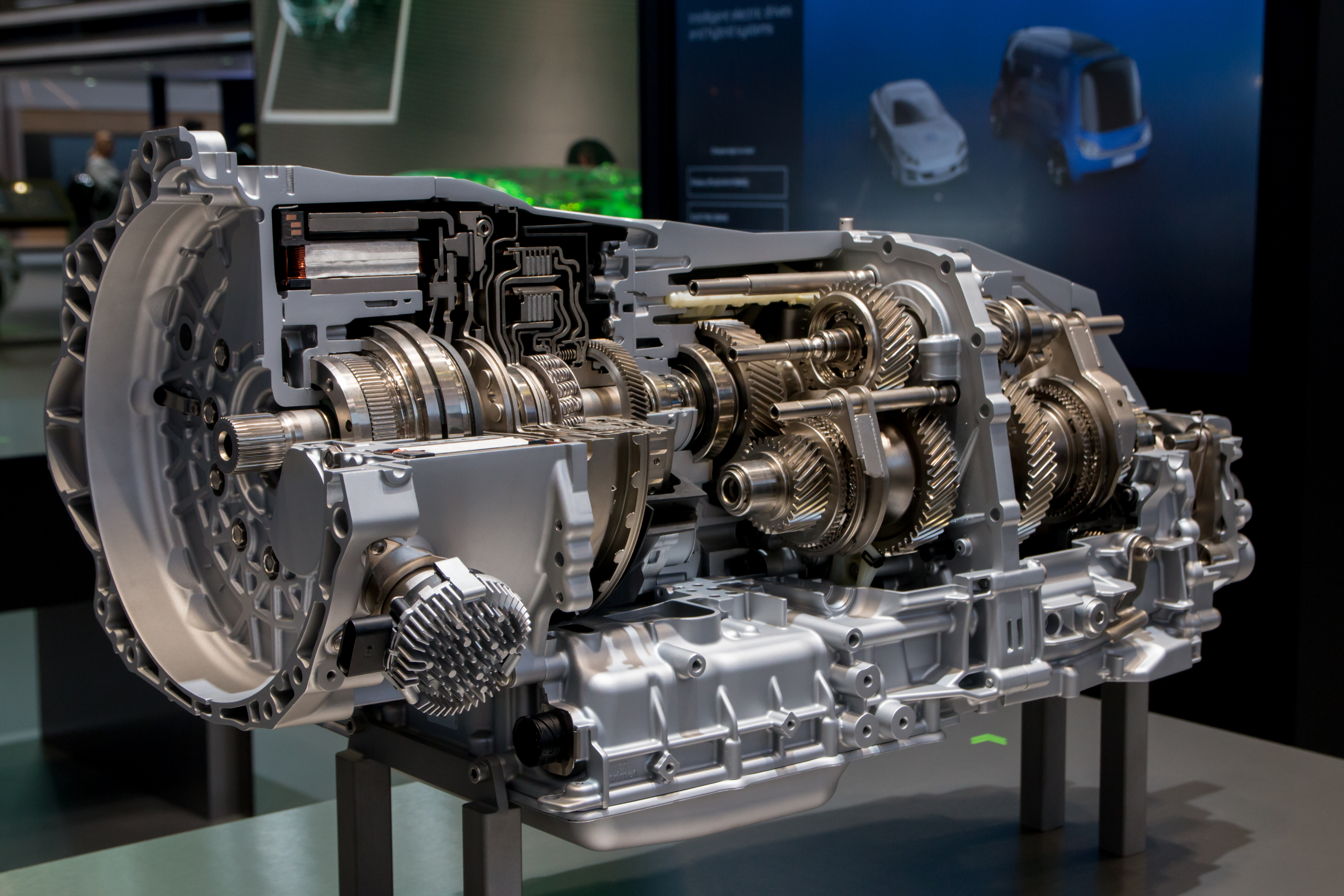
Cutaway of a Porsche 971 Panamera ZF gearbox

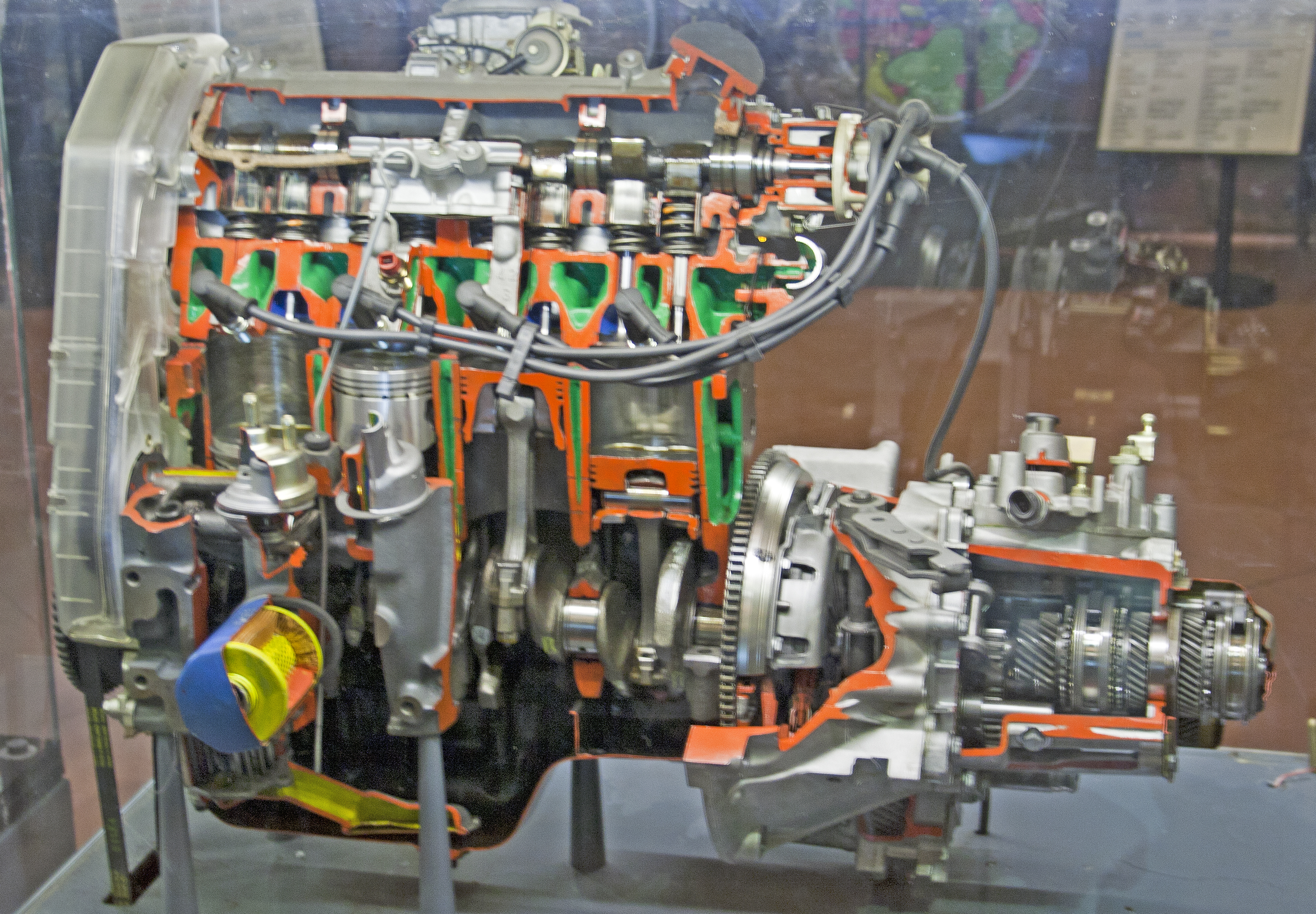
Cutaway of a Fiat 1581 cm^{3} engine

== See also ==
- Cutaway drawing
