= Mykhaylo Zagirnyak =

Ukrainian scientist

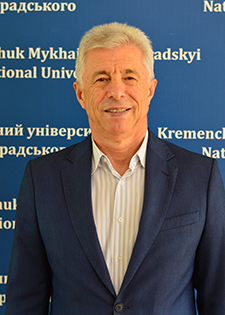
- Born: 25 September 1947 (age 78); Voroshilovgrad, Ukrainian SSR, Soviet Union (present-day Luhansk, Ukraine)
- Education: Lugansk Machine Construction Institute (East Ukrainian Volodymyr Dahl National University)
- Scientific career
- Fields: Electromechanics, education administration
- Workplaces: Kremenchuk Mykhailo Ostrohradskyi National University

Mykhaylo Zagirnyak (Ukrainian: Загірняк Михайло) is a Ukrainian scientist working in the fields of electromechanics and education administration. He is a Full Member (academician) of National Academy of Pedagogical Sciences of Ukraine, Honored Scientist and Engineer of Ukraine, Laureate of the State Prize of Ukraine in the field of science and technology, Laureate of the State Prize of Ukraine in the field of education, and a Doctor of Science (Eng) Professor. He is also the President of Kremenchuk Mykhailo Ostrohradskyi National University. Mykhaylo Zagirnyak entered the TOP-2% list of the career-long world most influential scientists according to the data of the researchers of Stanford University and the analysts of Elsevier and SciTech Strategies publishing house as of October 1, 2023; August 1, 2024; August 1, 2025.

== Biography ==
Mykhaylo Zagirnyak graduated from Lugansk Machine Construction Institute with honors (1970). After the graduation he worked as an engineer at the Lugansk diesel locomotive plant. He served in the army. From 1971 until 2002, Zagirnyak worked as a research assistant, senior lecturer, associate professor, head of the department and pro-rector of East Ukrainian Volodymyr Dahl National University. He worked at the Universities of Kentucky and Texas as the winner of the long-term United States government grants for programs IREX (Electrical Engineering - 1983–1984) and Fulbright (Education Administration - 1997–1998). From November 2002 to June 2025, he was the rector of Kremenchuk Mykhailo Ostrohradsky National University. In June 2025, he was elected President of the university.

He is the author of more than 600 scientific papers, including 20 monographs, nine brochures, seven handbooks and 12 textbooks approved by the Ministry of Education and Science of Ukraine, as well as over 80 author's certificates and patents for inventions. Over 200 papers have been published in journals included into the international databases as to «ISI Web of Knowledge» and to «Scopus».

== Professional and public activity ==
Zagirnyak has been a Member of the Presidium of the National Academy of Educational Sciences of Ukraine since 2017. Zagirnyak is also a Member of the Presidium of Union of Rectors of Higher Educational Institutions of Ukraine (2019—2021). He was the Head of the research projects within the framework of scientific and technical cooperation between Ukraine and Slovenia (2003–2004, 2007–2008). He was Editor-in-chief of two and a member of the editorial boards of four national and two foreign editions. Head of the Specialized Academic Council for awarding of the Ph.D. and D.Sc. degrees at Kremenchuk Mykhailo Ostohradskyi National University. He is a Member of the Scientific Council of the Ministry of Education and Science of Ukraine (2015—2023), the North-East Scientific Center of NAS and MES of Ukraine (since 2015), the Joint Competition Commission for the Award of the Verkhovna Rada Prize Of Ukraine to young scientists and nominal scholarships of the Verkhovna Rada of Ukraine for young scientists – doctors of science (since 2019). Supervisor of the seminar on "Electromagnetic and electromechanical processes in electric machines and apparatuses" of the Ukrainian National Academy of Sciences Academic Council specialized in problem "Scientific fundamentals of electrical power engineering" (since 2003). He has also been a member of the Higher School Academic Council of European and Regional Studios (Czech Budiyovice, Czech Republic), and an, Advisor to the Chairman of the Accounting Chamber of Ukraine (2002 – 2011). He delivered lectures in the University of Maribor (Slovenia) in 2012, 2015 and 2018; the University of Ljubljana (Slovenia) in 2019. Member of four public international and Ukrainian academies and three international professional societies. Chairman and member of a number of steering, program and technical committees of international and Ukrainian conferences and symposiums (Poland, Belgium, Italy, Slovenia). IEEE Life Senior member.

== Sport activity ==
He has been the Master of Sports of the USSR (1984), Merited coach of Ukraine (2011), Instructor-methodologist of the first category (1987) and Sport Referee of the national category in mountaineering (2004), as well as referee of the international category of Euro-Asian Mountaineering Association (No. 16, 2019), vice-president of the Federation of Mountaineering and Climbing of Ukraine (2002–2020), chairman of the Federation of Mountaineering and Climbing in Poltava region (since 2003) and badge "Rescue Squad" (No. 3002). He has made more than 200 high altitude ascents, more than 60 of which – by the routes of the highest fifth and sixth difficulty grades (11 first ascents and groundbreakings). Additionally, he was a participant of five Himalayan expeditions, Chevalier of the Order of mountain climbers "Edelweiss" of the ІІ degree (2008), and Multiple champion and prize-winner of Ukraine and the CIS mountaineering Championships.

== Scientific and honorary titles and awards ==
- Honored Scientist and Engineer of Ukraine (1997);
- Doctor of Science (Eng.) (1996);
- Professor (1993);
- Full Member (academician) of the National Academy of Pedagogic Sciences of Ukraine (2016);
- Order of Prince Yaroslav the Wise, IV class (October 1, 2021)
- Order of Prince Yaroslav the Wise, V class (May 19, 2018)
- Order of merit, I class (June 27, 2015) — for considerable personal contribution into the state formation, social, economic, scientific and technical, cultural and educational development of Ukraine, considerable labor achievements and high professionalism;
- Orders of merit, III (2001) and II (2007) classes;
- State Prize of Ukraine in the field of science and technology for 2015 — for the work "Energy efficient electromechanical systems of multiple technological purposes" (team work);
- State Prize of Ukraine in the field of education for 2018 — for the work "Development and implementation of innovative training technologies for the training of qualified workers in the profession "Welder"" (team work);
- Merited Coach of Ukraine (2011);
- Honorary citizen of the city of Kremenchuk (2016);
- Honored professor of Kremenchuk Mykhailo Ostrohradskyi National University (2011);

Honorary Diplomas of the:

- Verkhovna Rada of Ukraine (2010)
- Cabinet of Ministers of Ukraine (2005)
- Accounting Chamber of Ukraine (2010)
- Ministry of Education and Science of Ukraine (2003)
- National Academy of Sciences of Ukraine (2013, 2018)
- Central Committee of the trade union of the workers of education and science of Ukraine (2007, 2012, 2021, 2022)

Badges of honor of the:

- National Academy of Sciences of Ukraine "For promoting the development of science" (2022);

Sign-award "Inventor of the USSR" (1988);

Sign-awards of the:

- Ministry of Education of Ukraine "Excellence in Education of Ukraine" (1996), "For scientific achievements" (2007)
- Academy of Pedagogic Sciences of Ukraine "K.D. Ushinskyi" (2007)
- Mountaineering Federation of Ukraine "First ascent" (2005)

Honorary sign of the Physical Education and Sports Committee of the Ministry of Education and Science of Ukraine (2008)

Third-degree Diploma of the Exhibition of Achievements of the National Economy of the Ukrainian Soviet Socialist Republic (1981);

Medals of the:

- Rescue Association units of the Russian Federation "For outstanding ascents" (2004);
- National Academy of Pedagogic Sciences of Ukraine "Hryhorii Skovoroda" (2012), "Volodymyr Monomakh" (2017), "Ivan Franko" (2022)
- Higher School of European and Regional Studios (Czech Republic) "For Merit in the Higher School of European and Regional Studios" (2013), "For Fidelity to the Higher School of European and Regional Studios" (2015);

Full member of the:

- Institute of Electrical and Electronics Engineering (IEEE Life Senior member);
- Polish Society of Applied Electromagnetism (1993);
- Ukrainian Transport Academy (1997);.
