= Volodymyr Nykyforov =

Ukrainian biologist (born 1964)

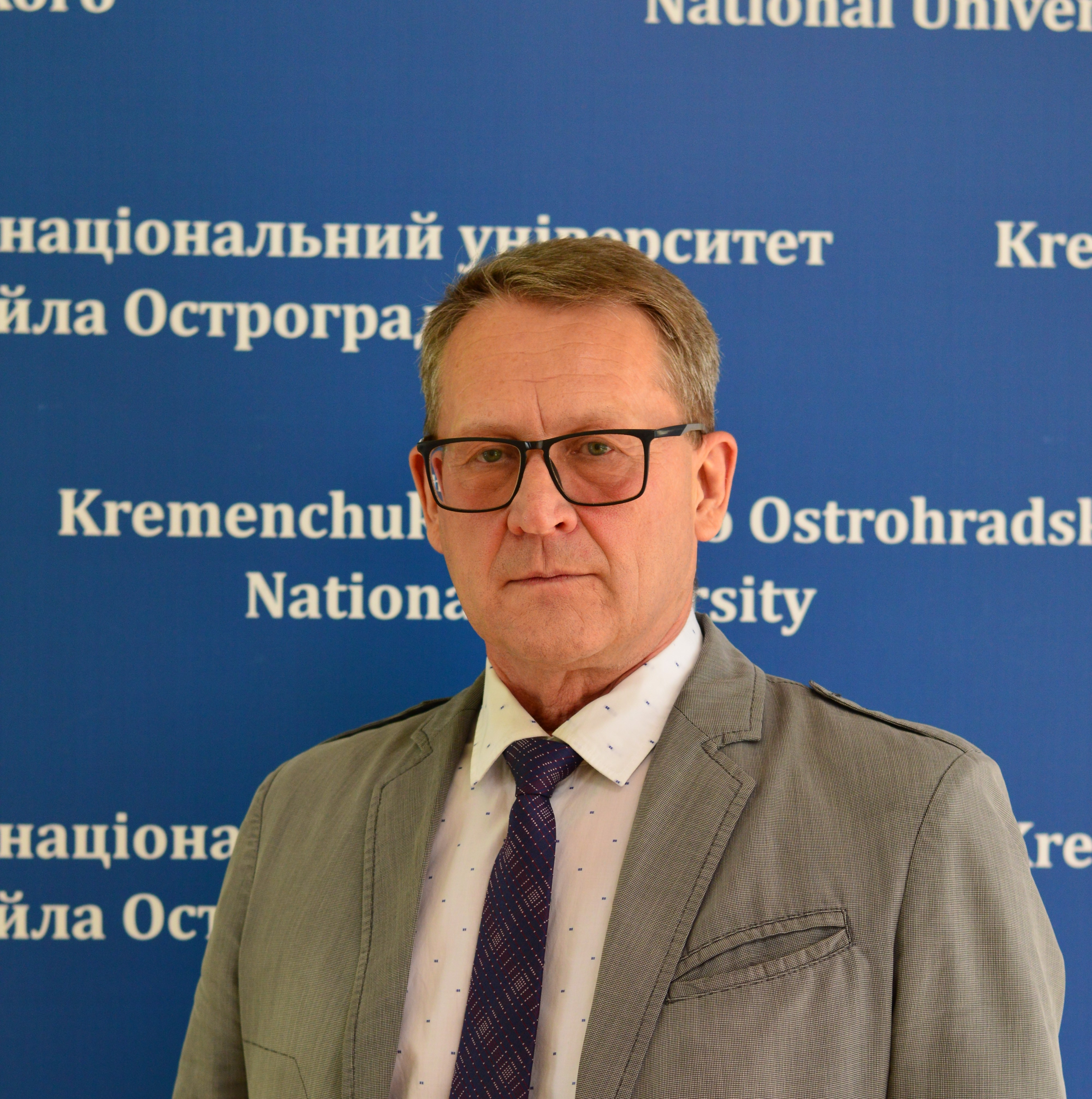
- Born: Kremenchuk, Ukraine
- Education: National University of Kharkiv
- Scientific career
- Fields: Nature conservation, Environmental biotechnology, Bioeconomics
- Workplaces: Kremenchuk Mykhailo Ostrohradskyi National University

Volodymyr Nykyforov is a Ukrainian biologist, ecologist and biotechnologist, Doctor of Science, Professor. He serves as first vice-rector of Kremenchuk Mykhailo Ostrohradskyi National University.

== Patents ==
1. Method for biological wastewater treatment / Declaratory patent UA 63719 A. − Bul. № 1, 2004
2. The method of obtaining biogas from blue-green algae / Declaratory patent UA 24106 U. − Bul. № 9, 2007
3. Method of methane and fertilizer production / Utility model patent 104743 № u201509476. − Bul. № 3, 2016
4. Electromagnetic compatibility of electromechanical and biological systems / Certificate of registration of copyright for a work № 69235 from 19.12.2016
5. A method for producing biogas from blue-green algae / Utility model patent 105896, № u201509295. − Bul. № 7, 2016
6. Computer program «Automated thesaurus formation system based on online translation services» / Certificate of registration of copyright for a work № 66298 from 24.06.2016
7. Method for extracting lipids from cyanobacterial biomass using a laser / Utility model patent 137244 № u201903571. − Bul. № 19, 2019
