= Ihor Kushnir =

Ukrainian businessman, politician, and mountaineer

- Ігор Кушнір
- Born: June 14, 1971 (age 55); Chernivtsi, Ukrainian SSR, Soviet Union (now Ukraine)
- Education: Kremenchuk Machine-Building Technical School (1990); Kremenchuk Polytechnic University (Mechanical Engineer, Economist of Enterprises); PhD in Law (2013); Doctor of Law, Administrative Law and Process (2019)
- Occupations: Politician, Businessman, Mountaineer
- Known for: completed the "Seven Summits" program, "Eight-thousanders" program

Ihor Kushnir (born June 14, 1971, Chernivtsi) is a Deputy Minister of Defense of Ukraine, mountaineer, and businessman. He is the former president of the company Kyivmiskbud, the vice-president of the Confederation of Builders of Ukraine, and the vice-president of the Builders’ Chamber of Ukraine. Since 1989, he completed a number of climbs, including on Elbrus, Aconcagua, Kilimanjaro, Lhotse, Manaslu, and others. In 2023, Ihor and his wife climbed Mount Everest.

== Education ==
In 1990, Ihor Kushnir graduated from the Kremenchuk Machine-Building Technical School.

After serving in the military, he entered the Kremenchuk Polytechnic University to become a mechanical engineer. In 2004, he graduated from the same university's postgraduate education faculty, earning an economist of enterprises degree.

In 2013, he earned a PhD in Law. In 2019, he became a Doctor of Law specializing in administrative law and process at the Institute of Legislation of the Verkhovna Rada of Ukraine.

== Career ==
In 1988, Ihor Kushnir began working as an electric welder at the Kremenchuk Housing Construction Combine.

Since 1993, he worked in commercial structures in Kremenchuk, and from 1994, held managerial positions. Initially, he was Deputy Director of the LLC "KP Agrofirma 'Zvezda'", and later became the General Director of the LLC "Kremenchuk Oil Company".

Until 2008, Ihor Kushnir served as Deputy Director of the company "MyS". In 2002, he was elected as a deputy to the Kremenchuk City Council.

From February 2008, he worked as Deputy Director of "Zhytloinvest".

In 2010, he moved to Kyiv, discontinued his work at the City Council and "Zhytloinvest".

From March 31, 2010, to February 18, 2012, Ihor Kushnir served as the Deputy Minister of Defense of Ukraine.

Since April 2012, he became a member of the Board and Vice President of Kyivmiskbud. On April 25, 2012, he was elected Chairman of the Board.

On December 20, 2023, after 12 years as President of "Kyivmiskbud", he resignedfrom the position.

== Mountaineering ==
Ihor Kushnir became interested in mountaineering in his childhood and started professional training in 1986 under the guidance of coach Serhiy Kosohorov. In 1989, he completed his first serious climb on Mount Kazbek. Among the peaks he conquered are Lhotse and Manaslu. He also completed the "Seven Summits" program, conquering Everest, Elbrus, Aconcagua, and Kilimanjaro twice. Additionally, he completed climbs as part of the "Eight-thousanders" program, including peaks like Cho Oyu, Everest, Lhotse, and Manaslu. Under the "Snow Leopard" program, he climbed Peak Lenin, Peak Korzhenevskaya (twice), and Peak Khan Tengri.

== Personal life ==
Ihor Kushnir is married and has two children. His son, Illya Ihorovych Kushnir (born January 26, 1994), was a deputy of the Kyiv City Council from 2021 to 2024.

== Awards ==
- Medal of the Ministry of Defense of Ukraine "Firearm" (2011)
- Medal of the Ministry of Defense of Ukraine "Honorary Badge" (2011)
- Honored Economist of Ukraine (2012)
- Medal "25 Years of Independence of Ukraine" (2016)
- Twice recognized as one of the best managers in Ukraine (2016, 2017)
- In 2021, he was recognized as one of the top three best top managers in Ukraine in the "Real Estate" category by the magazine Focus.
