= Lugcentrokuz =

Ukrainian industrial company

Coordinates: 48°34′53″N 39°20′00″E

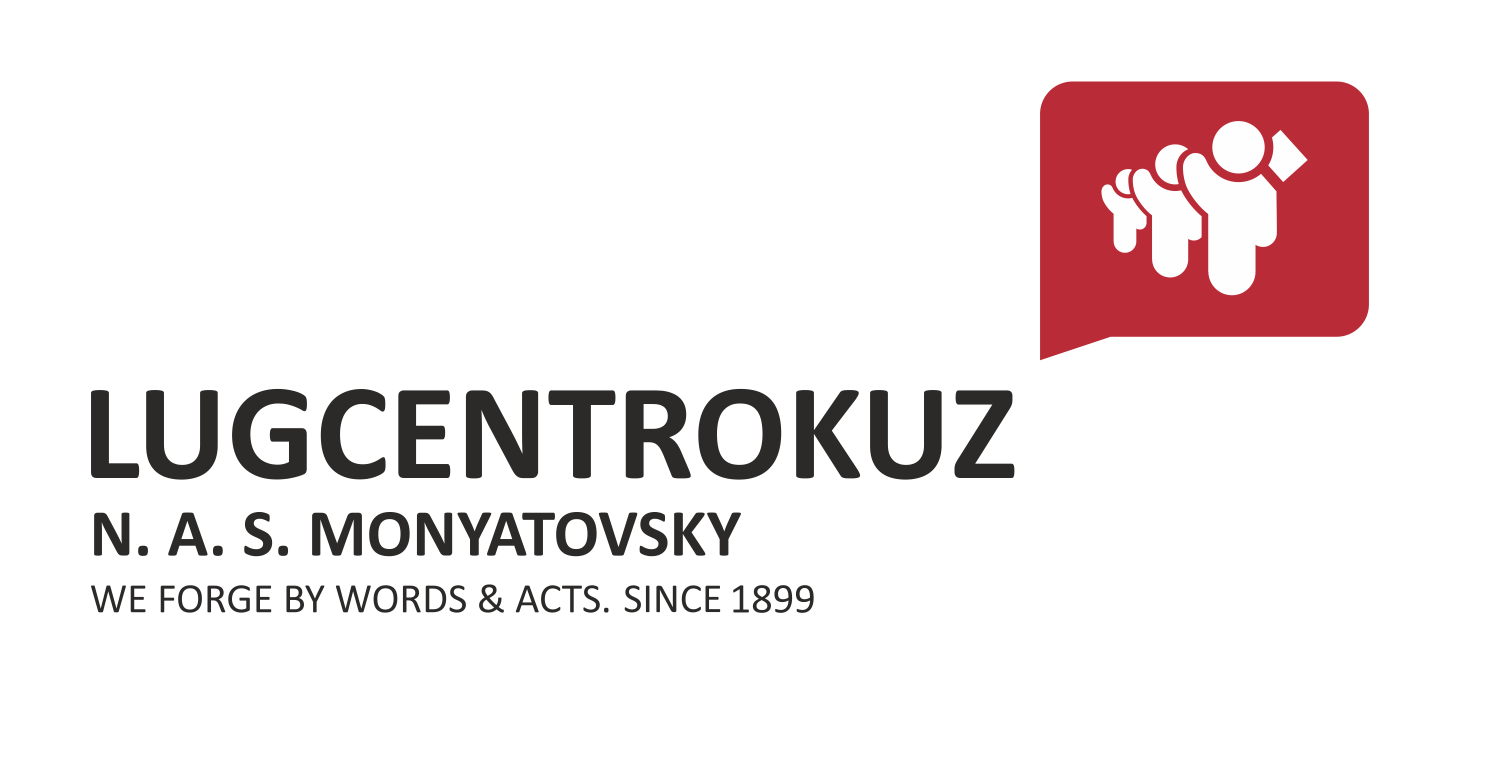

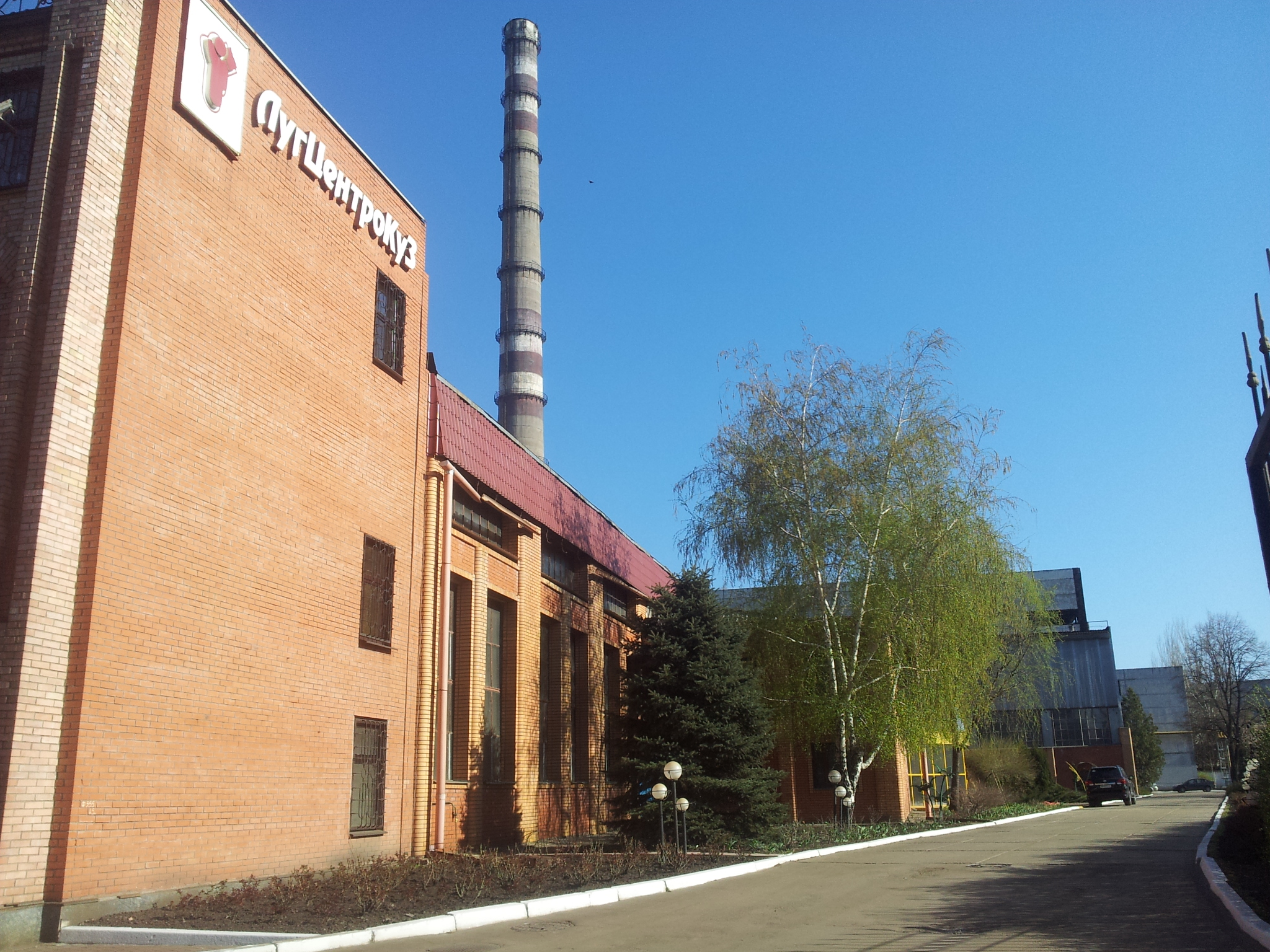
- Native name: ПрАТ «ЛУГЦЕНТРОКУЗ ІМ. С. С. МОНЯТОВСЬКОГО»
- Type: Private joint-stock company "Luhcentrokuz named after Stanislav Monyatovsky
- Industry: Rail transport
- Founded: 1991
- Founder: Stanislav Monyatovsky
- Headquarters: Luhansk, Ukraine
- Number of employees: 945 (as of 2020)
- Website: www.lck.com.ua/en

Lugcentrokuz (Ukrainian: Лугцентрокуз, lit. Lugansk Central Forging Factory) is a Ukrainian rail transport industrial company headquartered in Luhansk. It was established as an independent company, based on the separated press forging department of Luhanskteplovoz locomotive factory in 1991.

According to Ukrainian media the company had stopped operating by April 2015 due to the war in Donbas and Luhansk being in control of the Luhansk People's Republic. According to local media the company employed 945 people in 2020.

== History ==
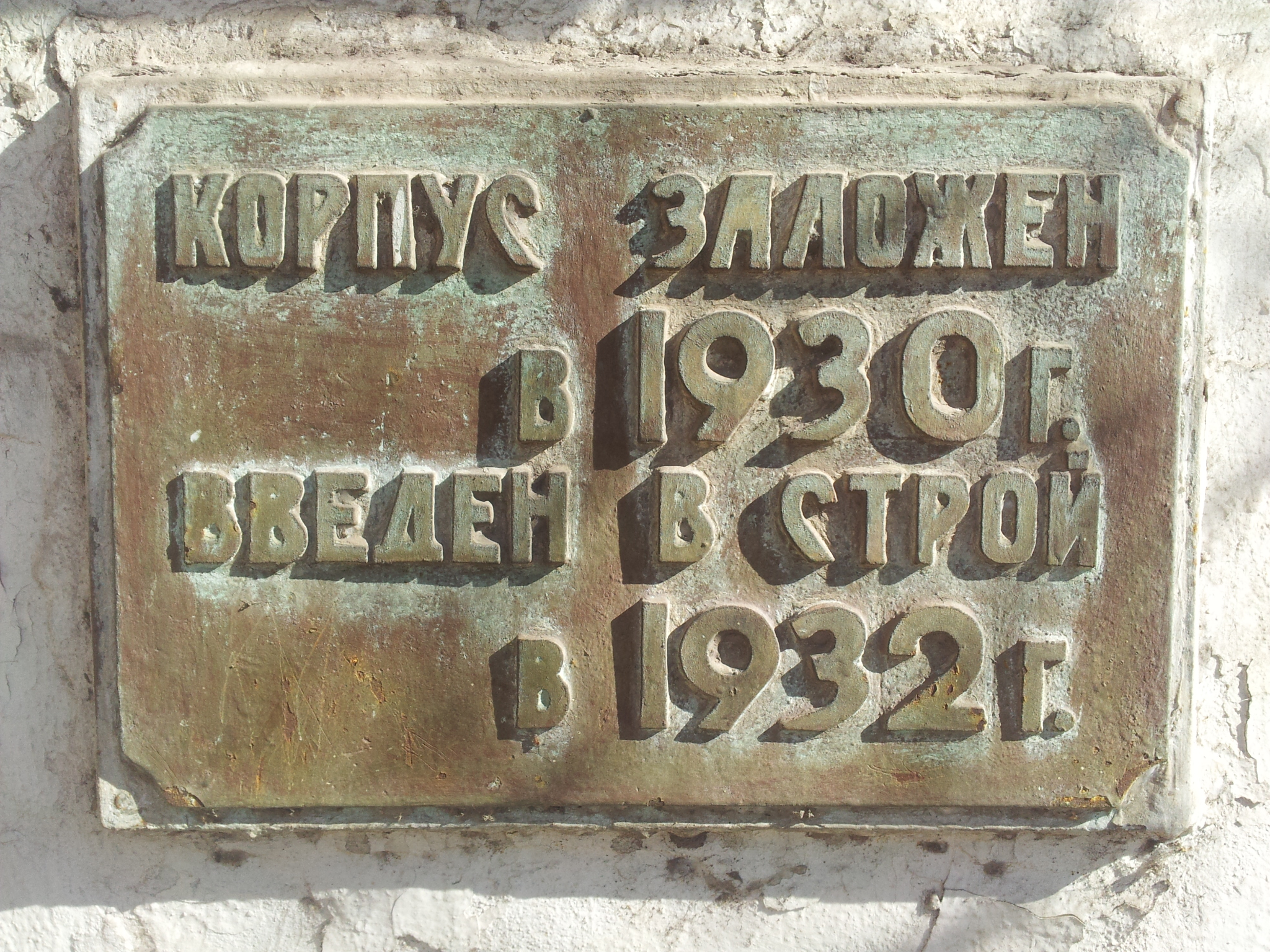
Plaque stating the construction dates.

Lugcentrokuz is one of the various companies founded from the existing steam locomotive factory in Luhansk that was built by the German entrepreneur Gustav Hartmann. A steam forge was one of its first departments.

During the period of Soviet Ukraine (1919-1991), the future Lugcentrokuz was a department of the Luhansk locomotive factory, then known as the October Revolution Locomotive Factory.

An extensive rebuild of the Luhansk factory was undertaken during 1928–1933 by the construction board, Luhanbud, during which the present company's central premises were reconstructed.

During the 1970s, the Luhansk locomotive factory produced up to 1500 locomotive units a year, 96% of which were main-line diesels.

The majority of Lugcentrokuz's exports went to Eastern Germany, Hungary, Poland, Czechoslovakia, Bulgaria, Egypt, Syria, India, Iran, Mongolia, North Korea and Cuba. Altogether, a total of 4000 main-line diesel locomotives were exported to countries outside of the Soviet Union.

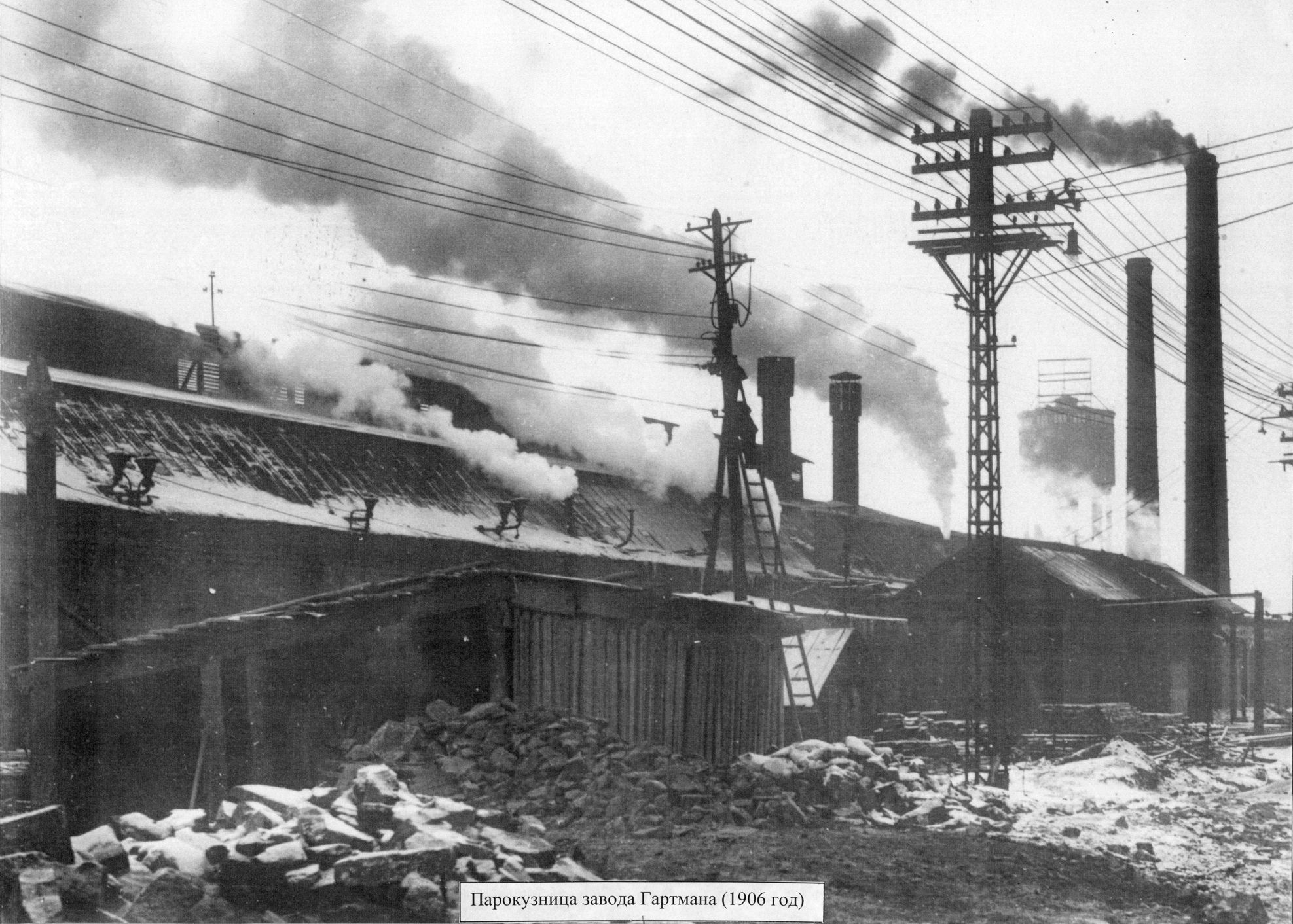
Year 1906

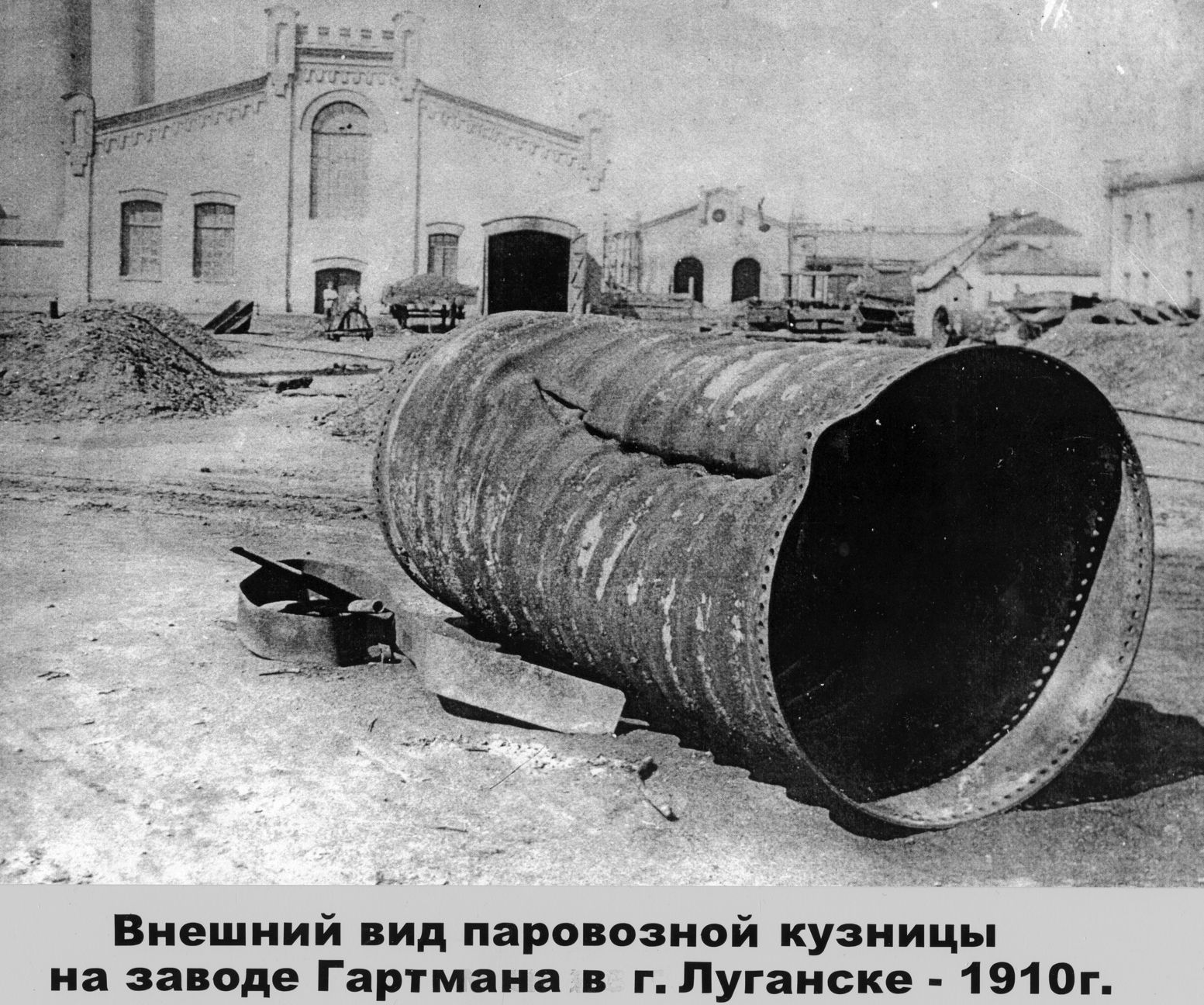
Year 1910

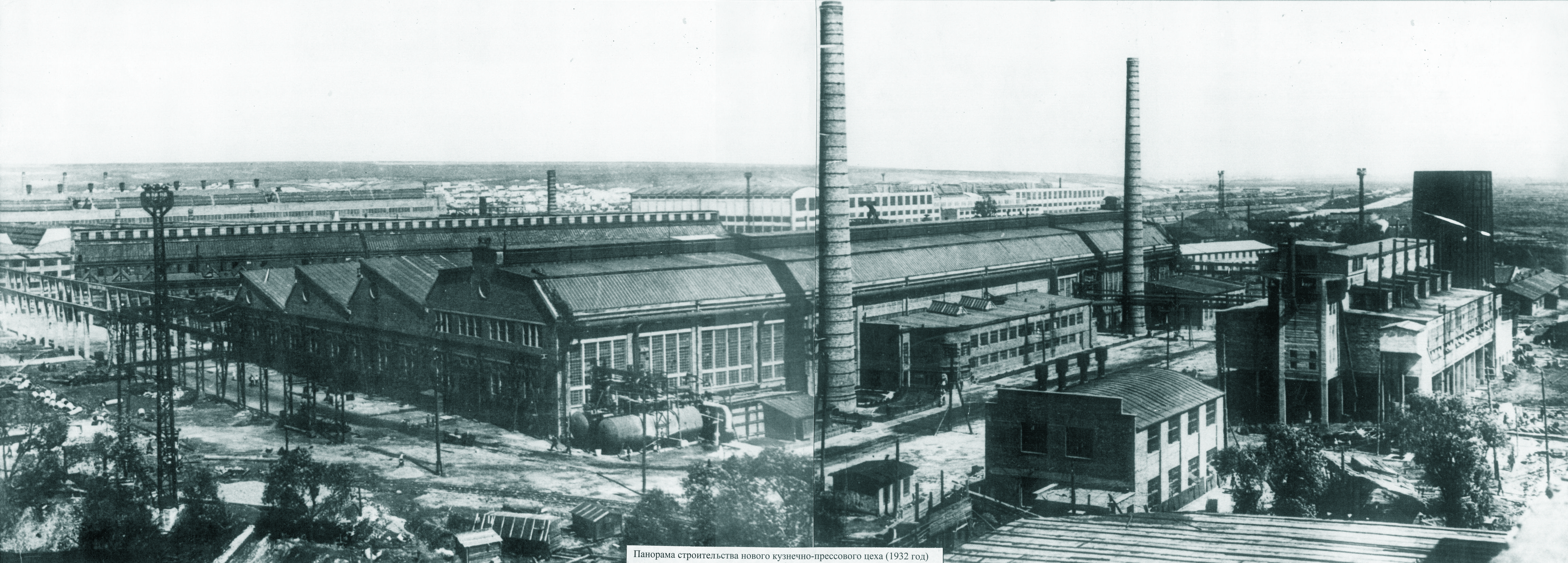
Year 1932

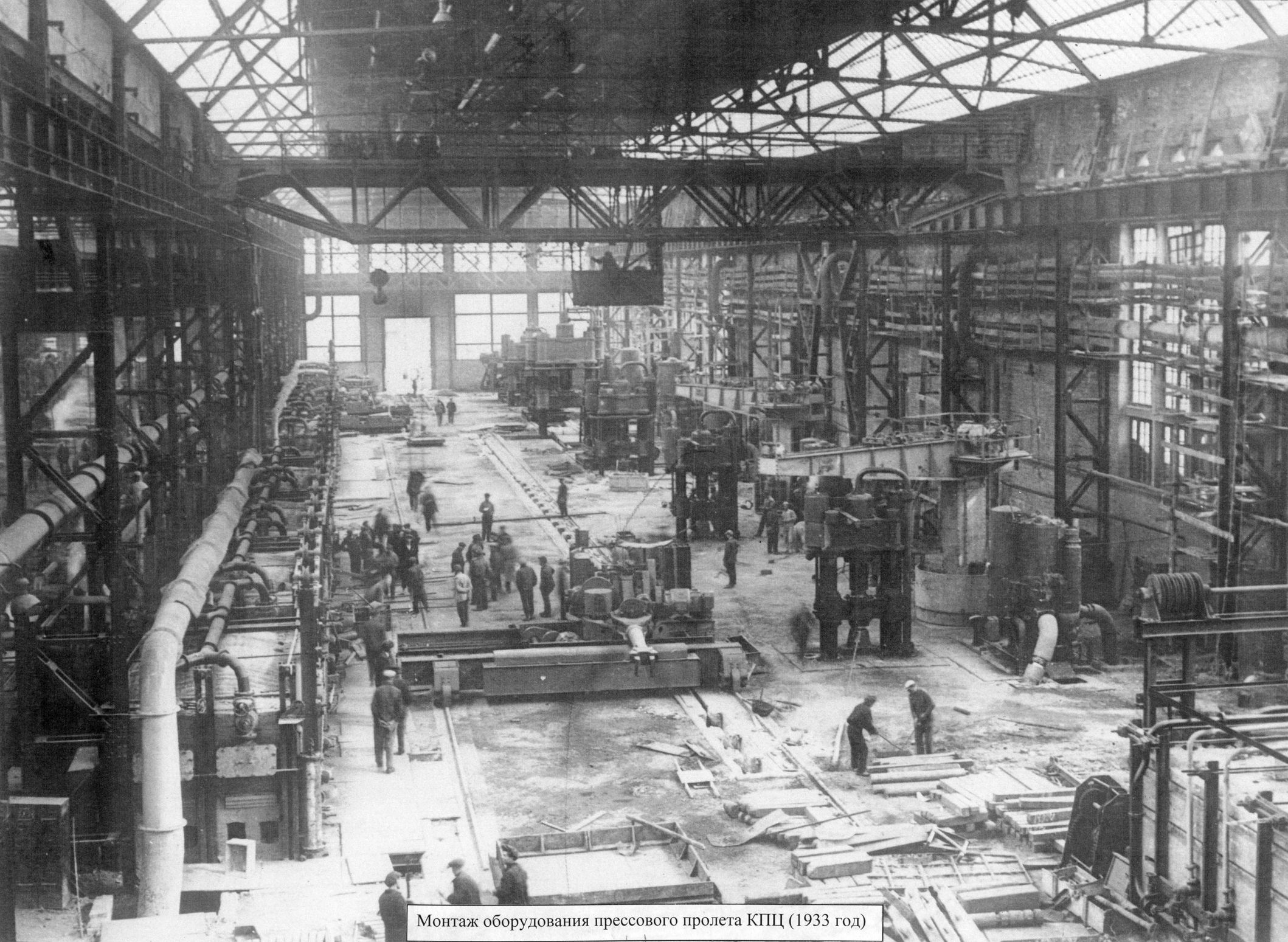
Year 1933

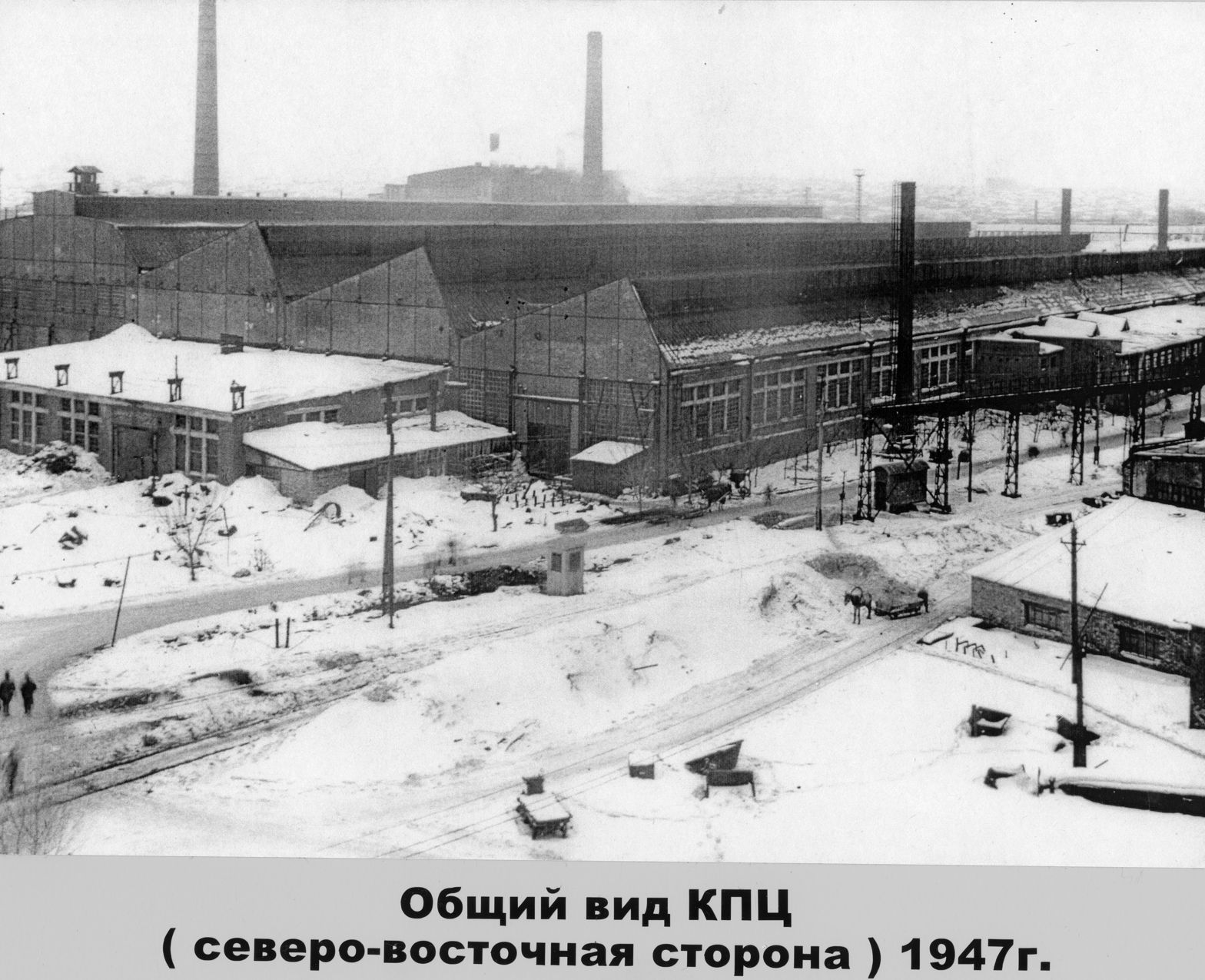
Year 1947

== Present day ==
After Ukrainian Independence in 1991, a separate company under the name of "Luhansk Central Forging Factory" was founded, based on the press forging department. In 1992, it gained its current name.

During the next several years, several new manufacturing techniques were introduced, which included electric arc steel furnacing, die manufacturing, mechanical assembling, leaf spring manufacturing and a testing center.

In 2013 the company exported to the following countries: Austria, Belarus, Bulgaria, Zambia, India, Indonesia, Spain, Kazakhstan, Canada, China, Germany, Pakistan, Poland, Russia, Romania, Serbia, Slovakia, Finland, Czech Republic and Switzerland.

In April 2015 Ukrayinska Pravda reported the company had stopped operating due to the war in Donbas and Luhansk being in control of the Luhansk People's Republic. According to local newspaper Our newspaper the company employed 945 people in 2020. In July 2019 CEO Alexander Miroshnikov claimed that 88% of its products were sold to Russia and the remaining 12% to Germany, Spain, Poland, Bulgaria, Slovenia and Slovakia. Miroshnikov also stated that the company had "completely reoriented exports to Russia and the EU since 2014, so it will not return to the Ukrainian market, even if Kyiv lifts the economic blockade of Donbass."

== See also ==
- Luhanskteplovoz
