= EPL2T multiple unit =

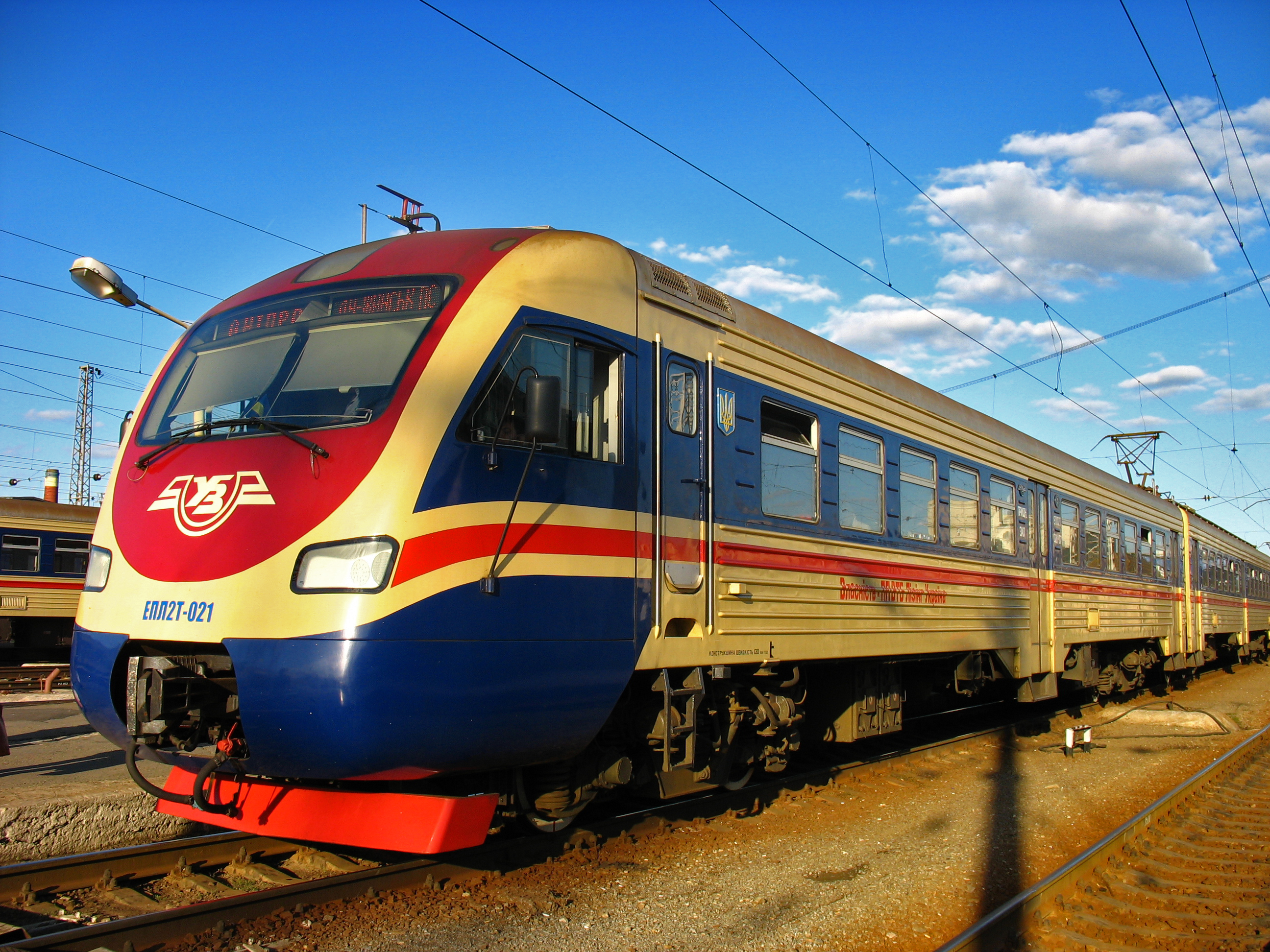
- EPL2Т-021 at Dnipro railway station, Ukraine
- Manufacturer: Luhanskteplovoz

Specifications
- Coupling system: SA3
- Track gauge: 1,520 mm (4 ft 11 27/32 in)

EPL2T (Ukrainian: ЕПЛ2Т) is a Ukrainian electric multiple unit for suburban commuter routes on lines electrified with 3 kV DC. The design is based on the earlier ЕR2Т of the Latvian Rīgas Vagonbūves Rūpnīca in Riga, 35 units was manufactured by Luhanskteplovoz between 2000 and 2008.
