= Kyivmiskbud =

Ukrainian construction company

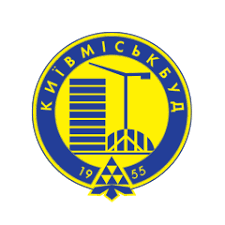
Logo

Kyivmiskbud (Ukrainian: Київміськбуд, a portmanteau for Kyiv City Construction, Київське міське будівництво) is a major construction holding company of Ukraine and the biggest construction company in Kyiv. It is also considered a community company that subordinates to the city government, which controls 80% of the company's stock. The holding company does not have full ownership of its held companies, many of which also co-owned with the fund union "Ukrayina".

The company's design bureau is owned by the Funding Union "Ukrayina" (51%) and the Grigorishin's Energy Standard Group SA (47%) through its Cyprus off-shore company the Energy Standard Projects Limited.

== History ==
The holding company was created in 1955 as Main Administration of Communal and Civil Engineering of the Kyiv City Executive Committee (today Kyiv City State Administration) based on various cities' house-building associations. It was abbreviated in Russified manner as Glavkievgorstroi. The first project was a panel apartment five story house on bulvar Druzhby Narodiv that was built back in 1958.

The holding company consists of several smaller construction corporations, number of daughter companies (subsidiaries) and several affiliates.

== List of subsidiaries ==
=== Construction and installation sector ===
- Kyivmiskbud-3 (Kyiv City Construction) since 1943
- KyivMiskbud-4
- Kyivmiskbud-6
- Reinforced concrete production factory "DBK-3" (abbr. House-building Consortium)
- DBK-4
- Taiga
- SBMU (abbr. Specialized construction and installation administration)

=== Special installation and decoration ===
- Kyivspetskbud (Kyiv Special Construction)
- Kyivelectromontazh (Kyiv Electric Installation)
- Kyivpidzemdorbud-2 (Kyiv Subterranean Roads Construction)
- Kyivoblytsbud (Kyiv Decorative Construction)
- Promenerhoavtomatyka (Industrial Energy Automation)

=== Construction equipment and transportation sector ===
- Special Machine Administration
- Budmekhanizatsia (Construction Equipment)
- Special Machine Administration 2
- Construction Administration 2
- Miskbudtrans (City Construction Transportation)
- ATP-6 (abbr. Autotransport Enterprise)
- Experiment Maintenance Enterprise
- ATP-1
- ATP-2
- ATP-7
- Autobudkompleks-K (Auto Construction Complex)
- ATP-5
- Elite Construction Mechanization

=== Materials production sector ===
- Promin (Beam)
- Woodworking Consortium 7
- Woodworking Consortium 3
- Wood chipboards Factory
- Experiment Mechanical Factory
- Factory of reinforced concrete products 1
- Zhulyany
- House-building Consortium "Vidradny" (Pleasing)
- Experiment Mechanical Factory "Metalist" (Metalworker)
- Beton-Kompleks (Concrete Complex)
- Kyivoporyadkomplekt (Kyiv Polishing Set)
- Factory of Finishing Materials

=== Affiliates ===
- Construction Company "Ukrenerhobud" (Ukrainian Energy Construction)
- Kyivbuddetalkomplekt (Kyiv Construction Detail Set)
- Budtrans (Construction Transport)
- Polar-Ukrayina
- Novobud (New Construction)
- Pre Tech Ukraine

== See also ==
- Kyivpastrans, another city's company
- Ihor Kushnir, former president of the company
