= Luhanskteplovoz =

Ukrainian large industrial company

OJSC Luhanskteplovoz
- Type: Open joint stock company
- Industry: Rail vehicle manufacturing
- Founded: 1896
- Founder: Gustav Hartmann
- Defunct: 2015
- Fate: looted in 2015 during the war in Donbas production stopped in 2015 (Ukrainian sources) or 2016 (Russian sources)
- Headquarters: Luhansk, Ukraine
- Key people: Director: Bykadorov Viktor; Deputy chairman of the Board : Gennady G. Basov; Chief Designer: Konstantin Pavlovich Mishchenko; Chief Technologist : Eugene A. Yakimenko
- Products: Locomotives
- Owner: Transmashholding
- Number of employees: >7000 (2009)
- Website: www.luganskteplovoz.com

Luhanskteplovoz (Ukrainian: Луганськтепловоз or Luhansk Locomotive Works), earlier known as Voroshilovgrad Locomotive Works was a large industrial company in Luhansk, Ukraine, manufacturing locomotives, multiple unit trains (both electric and diesel) as well as other heavy equipment. Due to the war in Donbas it has not been operating since March 2015. According to media reports, by late 2015 the works were looted and completely inoperational.

The company was founded in 1896 as Russische Maschinenbaugesellschaft Hartmann in Lugansk (Russian Engineering Company Hartmann in Luhansk) and renamed October Revolution Locomotive Factory in November 1922.

In the second half of the twentieth century the plant produced thousands of the well known 'M62 locomotive' and DR Class 130 (TE109) ("ludmillas") diesel electric locomotives for Eastern Bloc countries.

== History ==
=== 1896 to 1995 ===
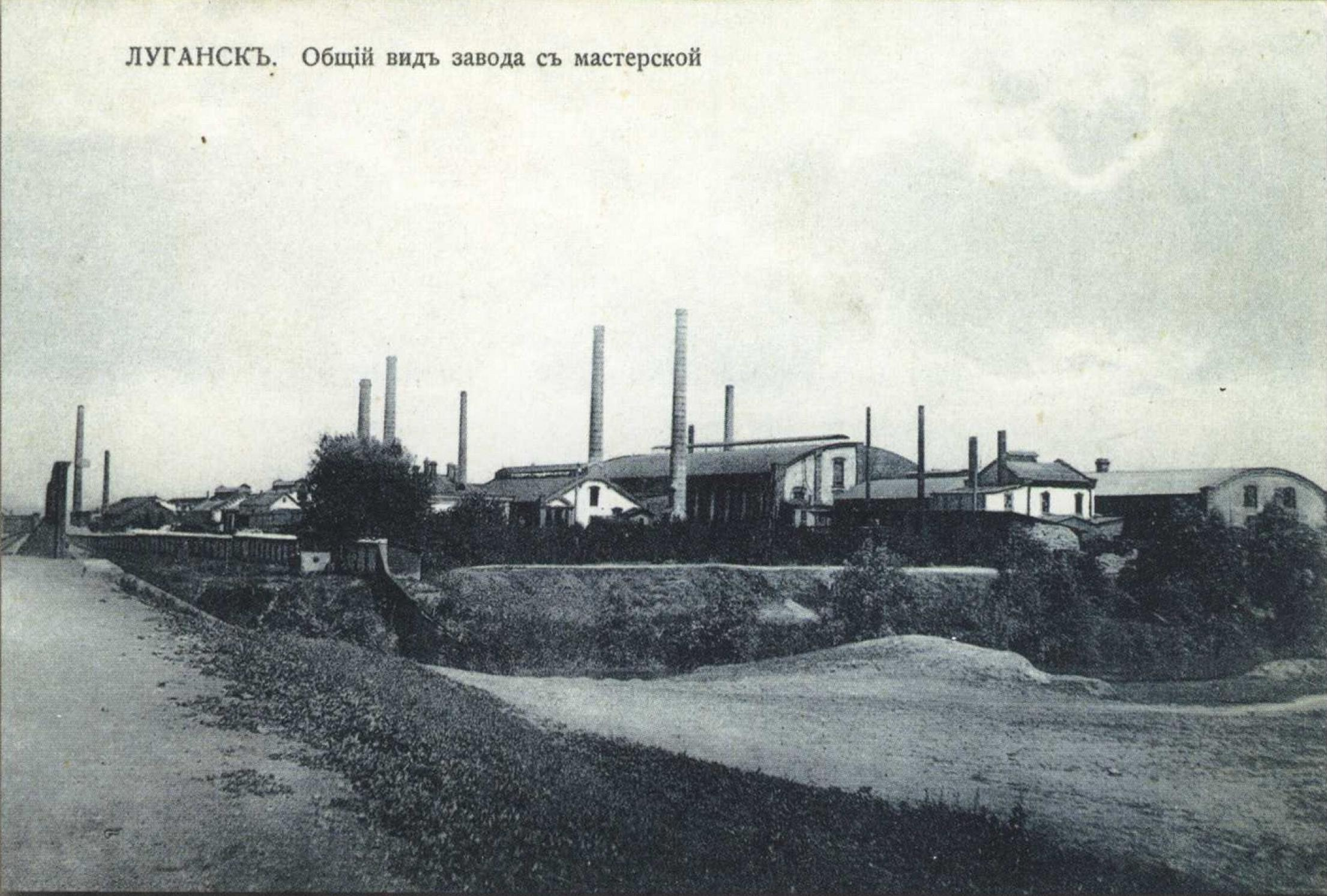
Hartmann works before 1917

The plant was founded in 1896 by Gustav Hartmann, (Note: Son of Richard Hartmann; also an industrialist) the first locomotive being produced in 1900; by 1906 the factory's output was comparable to the two major locomotive production centres in Russia at that time : the Bryansk works and the Putilov works. Between 1928 and 1933 the works was expanded and production of the powerful 2-10-2 locomotives of the FD class (ФД) (Note: Named after Felix Dzerzhinsky (Феликс Дзержинский)) and 2-8-4 configuration IS class (ИС) (Note: Named after Joseph Stalin (Iosif Stalin)) began.

During the second world war work switched to military production, the plant being evacuated twice in the course of the war. By 1945 locomotive production has resumed with SO class (CO) (Note: Named after Grigol (Sergo) Orjonikidze (Серго Орджоникидзе))

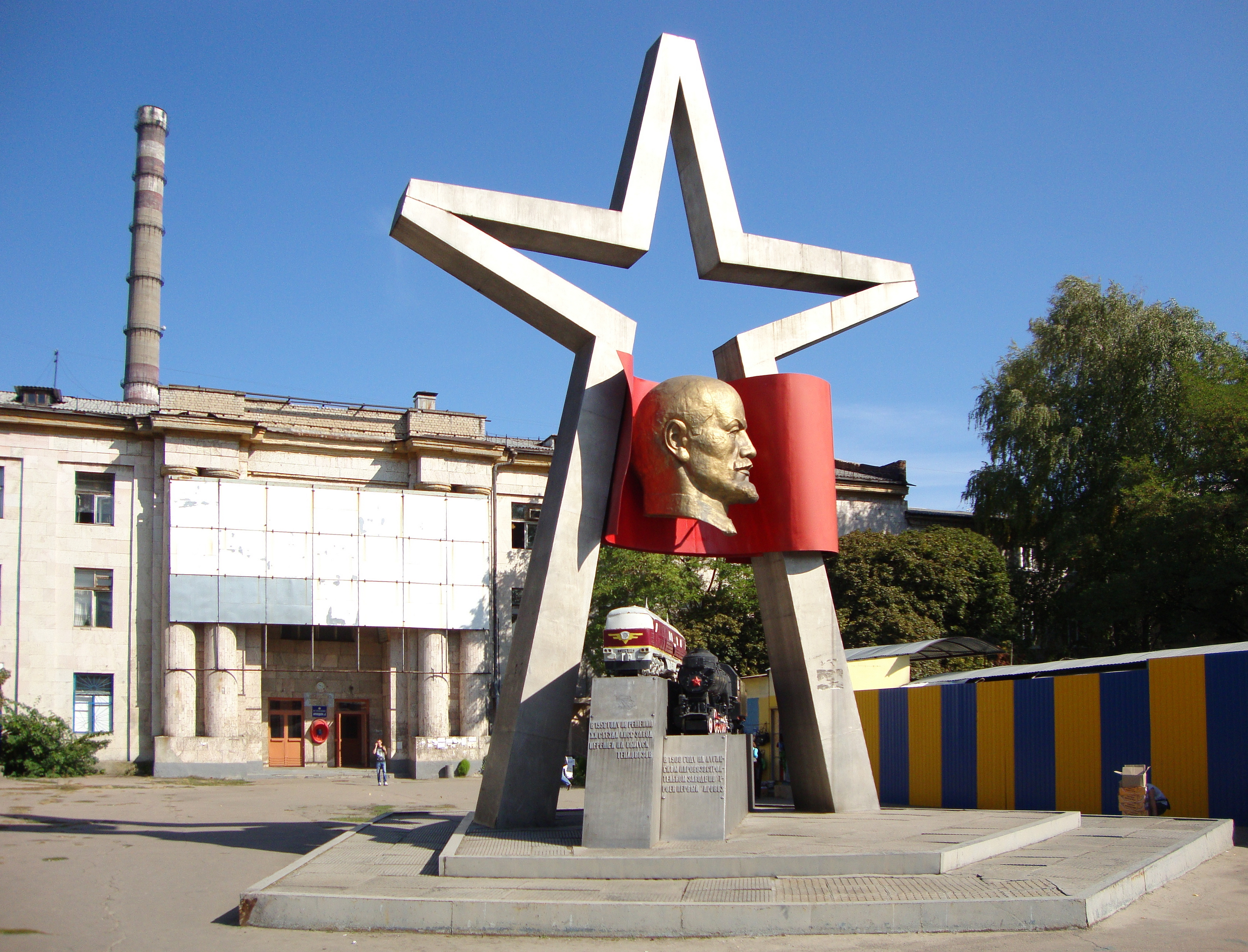
Main gate of Luhanskteplovoz in Luhansk

In 1956 steam locomotive production ceased; over 12,000 steam locomotives having been produced, and the plant was converted to the production of locomotives powered by diesel engines by 1957

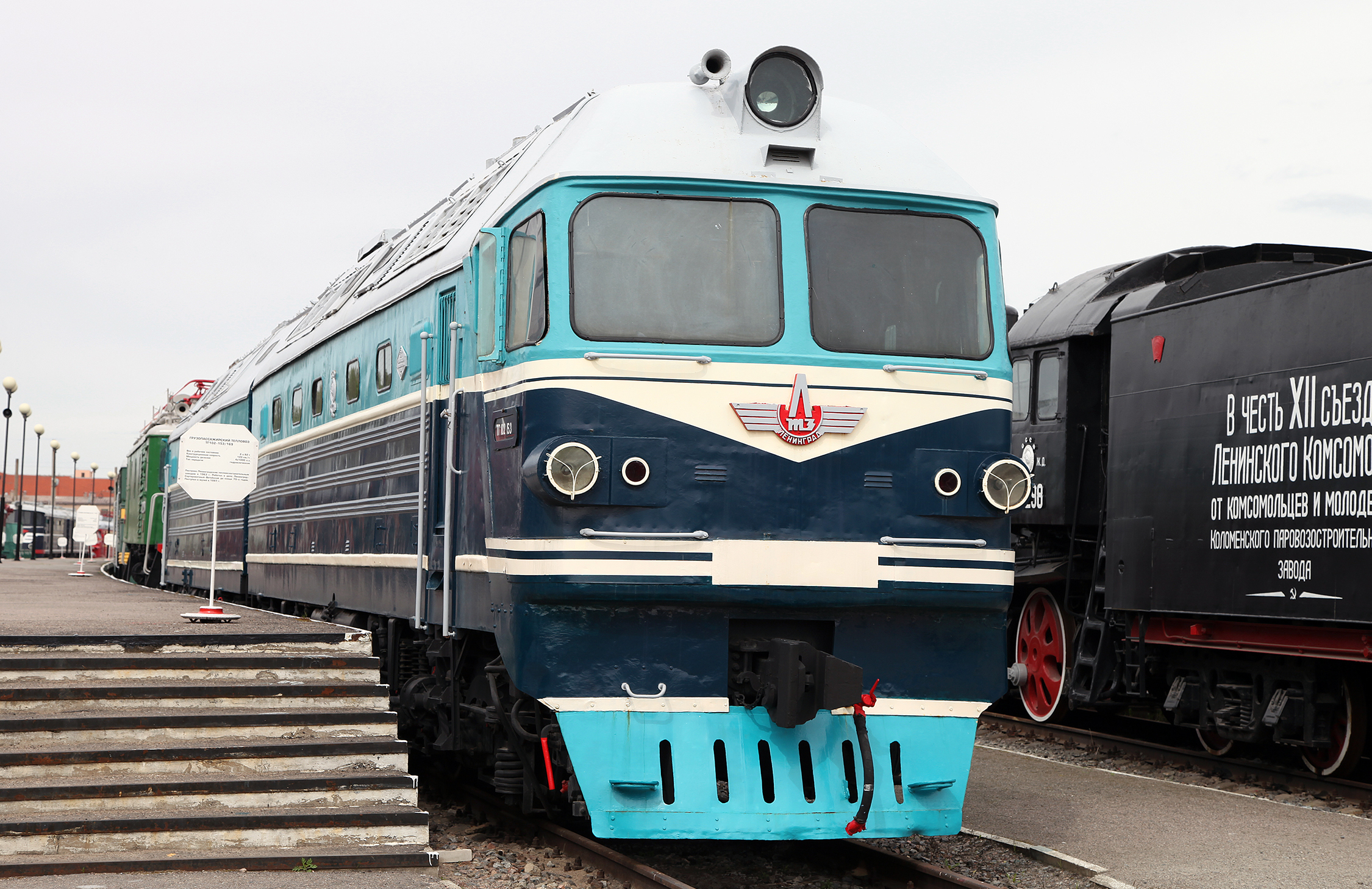
TG102

Initially diesel machines using hydraulic transmissions TG100, TG102, TG105, TG106 (ТГ100, ТГ102, ТГ105, ТГ106) (Note: Cyrillic TГ : "T" indicates Тепловоз "Diesel-locomotive", "Г" гидропередачей - "hydraulic transmission") were produced, though eventually electrical (DC) transmissions became the norm on Russian railways, such as mainline locomotive type 2TE10L (2ТЭ10Л) (Note: Cyrillic TЭ : "T" indicates Тепловоз "Diesel-locomotive", "E" Электричество - "electricity") and its variants, which started production at Luhansk in 1962, eventually more than 12,000 units had been produced. In 1965 the first M62 locomotive was produced at the plant.

In 1967 the TE109 (ТЭ109) locomotive was created; using an AC/DC electrical transmission, (Note: Electricity produced as alternating current (AC) by an alternator, and then rectified to direct current (DC) to supply DC motors) which formed the basis for a successful series of locomotives, better known in western Europe by the standard gauge (1435mm) version : DR Class 130 and variants. Later products included the high powered TE121 (2ТЭ121) and variants introduced 1977, and working experiments in AC traction TE120 and 2TE127 (ТЭ120 and 2ТЭ127), and liquified gas powered locos 2TE10G and 2TE116G (Note: The prefix "2" indicates two units permanently coupled, G (Г) indicates 'gas' (Газ)) (2ТЭ10Г and 2ТЭ116Г) - the latter based on the 2TE116 diesel.

In the late 1970s the plant was expanded and a record of over 100 locomotive units produced per month was achieved in the 1980s. Later in the 1990s mining machinery and urban transit rolling stock became part of the factories portfolio. With the breakup of the Soviet union the plant became the property of the Ukrainian state and in 1995 the state holding company Luhanskteplovoz was created.

=== 1990s ===
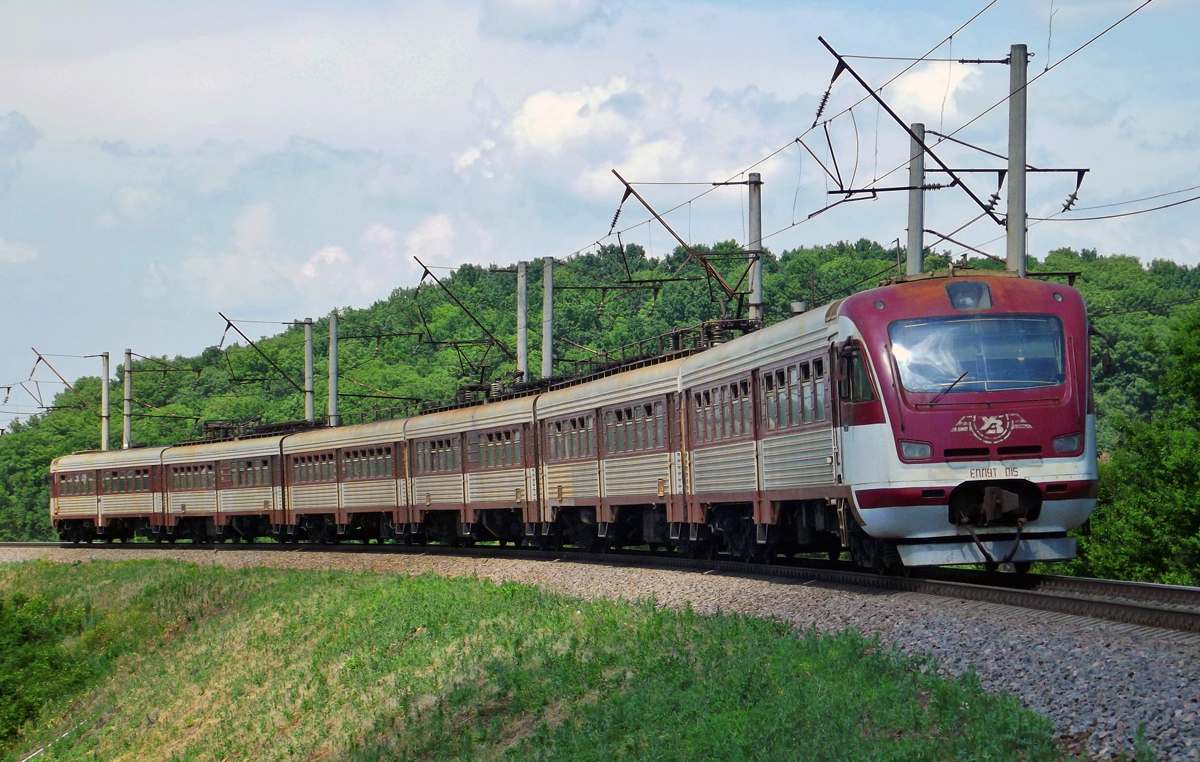
EPL9T

Since 1997 the plants has started production of diesel multiple units such as DEL-01 (ДЕЛ-01), DEL-02 (ДЭЛ-02), push-pull trainsets DPL1 (ДПЛ1) and DPL2 (ДПЛ1) for diesel locomotives, electric multiple units EPL2T (ЕПЛ2Т) and EPL9T (ЕПЛ9Т) as well as passenger diesel locomotive TE114I (ТЕ114І) (designed for desert conditions).

In the 90s, the factory started producing trams. None of its models were widely successful, with 4 LT-5 built for Moscow and none in service, around 20 LT-10 trams in various cities. The unused serial numbers likely represent incomplete bodies. However, the plant is notable for building the first low-floor tram car in Ukraine, the LT-10A.

=== 2009 privatisation ===
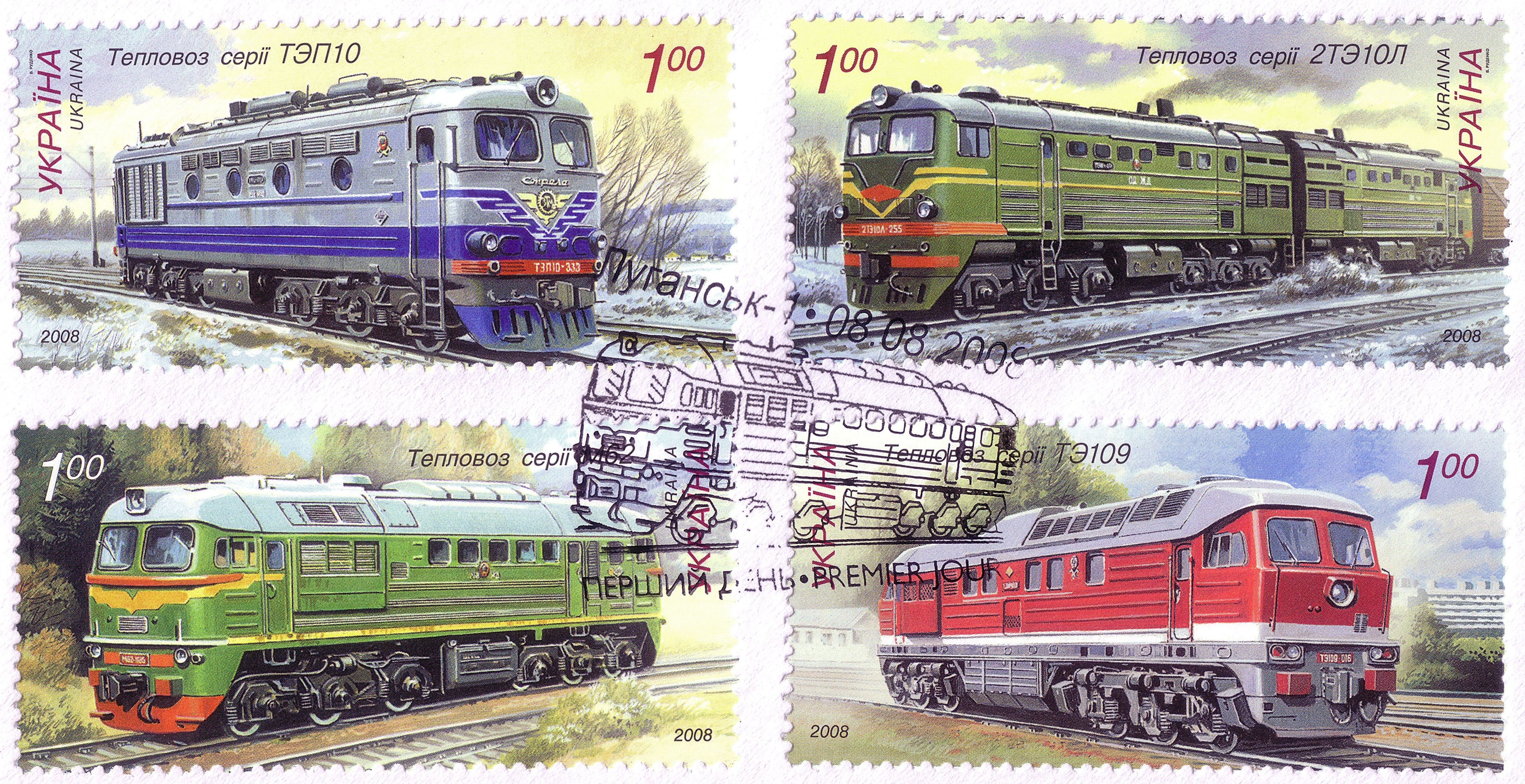
4 Ukrainian stamps celebrating Luhanskteplovoz locomotives

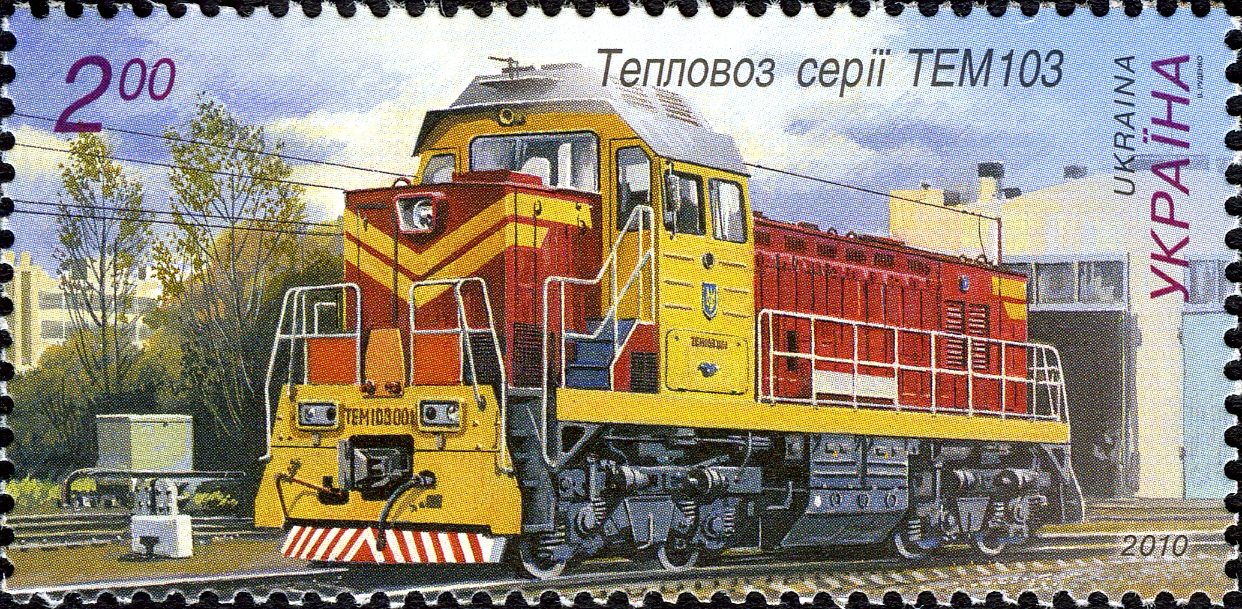
Stamp of Ukraine featuring TEM103

After becoming part of state owned property following Ukrainian independence the process of privatising the company put under consideration in 2005, in 2006 potential shareholders were OJSC Demikhovsky Machine-Building Plant, DniproVagonMash, OJSC Marganets Ore Mining and Processing Enterprise, CJSC Management company Bryansk Machine-Building Plant. Of the bidders only two: Bryansk Machine-Building Plant and Demikhovo Machinebuilding Plant were selected as suitable; both being part of the Transmashholding group of companies. The successful buyer was Bryansk machine building plant, offering ₴292.5 million ($58 million) for a 76% stake; this was only 0.5 million more than the bidding auction starting price. Analysts at the time valued the asset at $200 million.

The then president Viktor Yushchenko believed that the Ukrainian people had been defrauded, with the business being sold for a fraction of its true worth. The then prime minister Yulia Tymoshenko also called for a review of the privatisation of Luhanskteplovoz along with two other enterprises Dniproenergo and Nikopol Ferroalloy Plant and BYuT MPs petitioned the Prosecutor General's Office for criminal proceedings to take place concerning alleged criminal activity by the heads of the State Property Fund.

The sale was ruled illegal in 2008. From uncertainty over the eventual status of Luhansteplovoz is said to have prevented the then owners Transmashholding from making further investments in the plant. Since the ruling the decision has been challenged by the State Property fund.

It was expected that the company would be attempted to be re-privatised included in the 2008 privatisation scheme, but instead the auction process started March 2010. Again analysts stated the starting price set by the Ukrainian government was once again surprisingly low at $50 million; while the company's stock market value was estimated at $127 million.

=== End of works ===
After the outbreak of the Russo-Ukrainian War and the capture of Luhansk by the Luhansk People's Republic, Luhanskteplovoz was re-registered in the city of Sievierodonetsk.

Due to the war in Donbas it became difficult to deliver components from Germany and the United States to the Luhansk plant by February 2015. Hence in March 2015 the plant stopped working. According to media reports, by late 2015 it was looted and completely inoperational. According to the Luhansk People's Republic representatives the looters had used fake contracts to carry out the illegal dismantling and removal of plant equipment. According to the Russian REGNUM News Agency Luhanskteplovoz owners, the Russian company Transmashholding, stopped production in 2016. Although it had overcome delivery problems because Luhanskteplovoz had become "completely unified with a similar plant in Bryansk". REGNUM claims production was halted in 2016 because Transmashholding was afraid international sanctions (in place since 2014 in response to the escalating War in Donbas) could jeopardize its cooperation with Siemens.

== Gallery ==
Luhanskteplovoz products
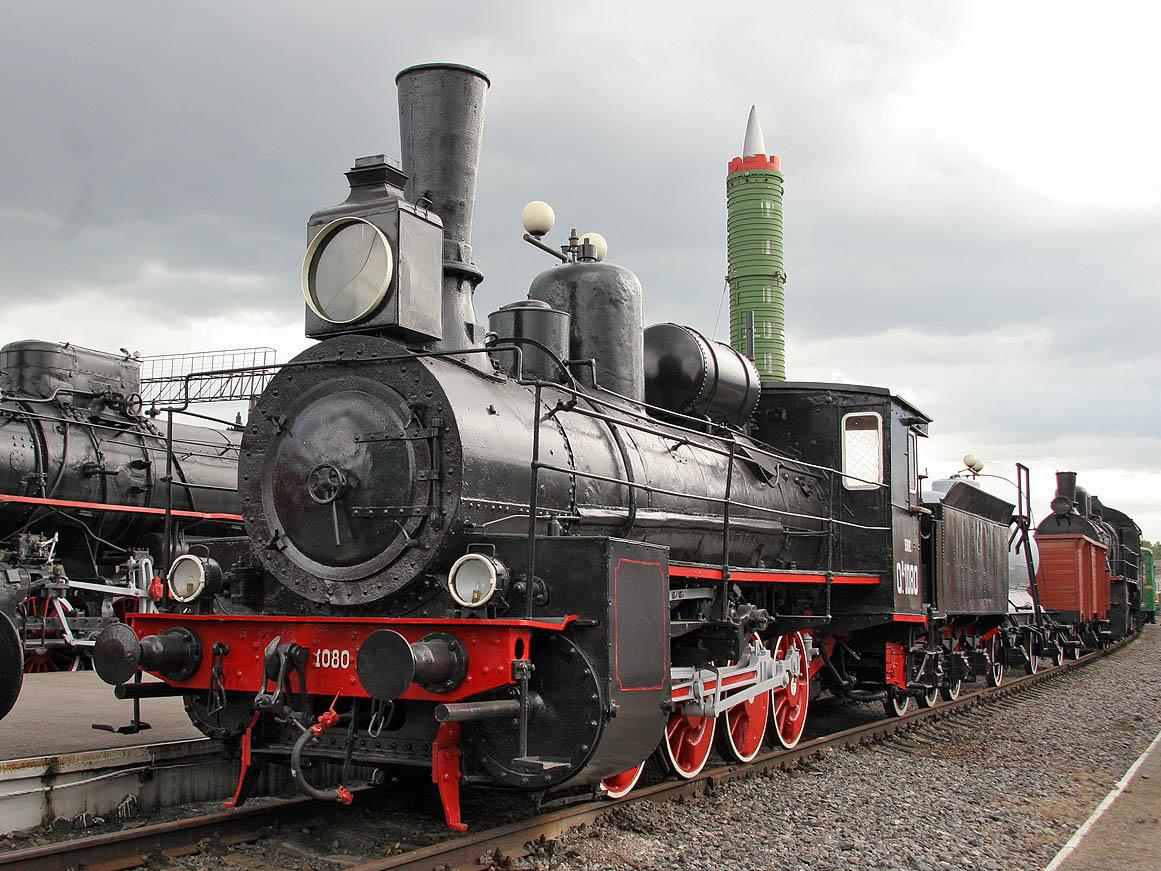
Class O

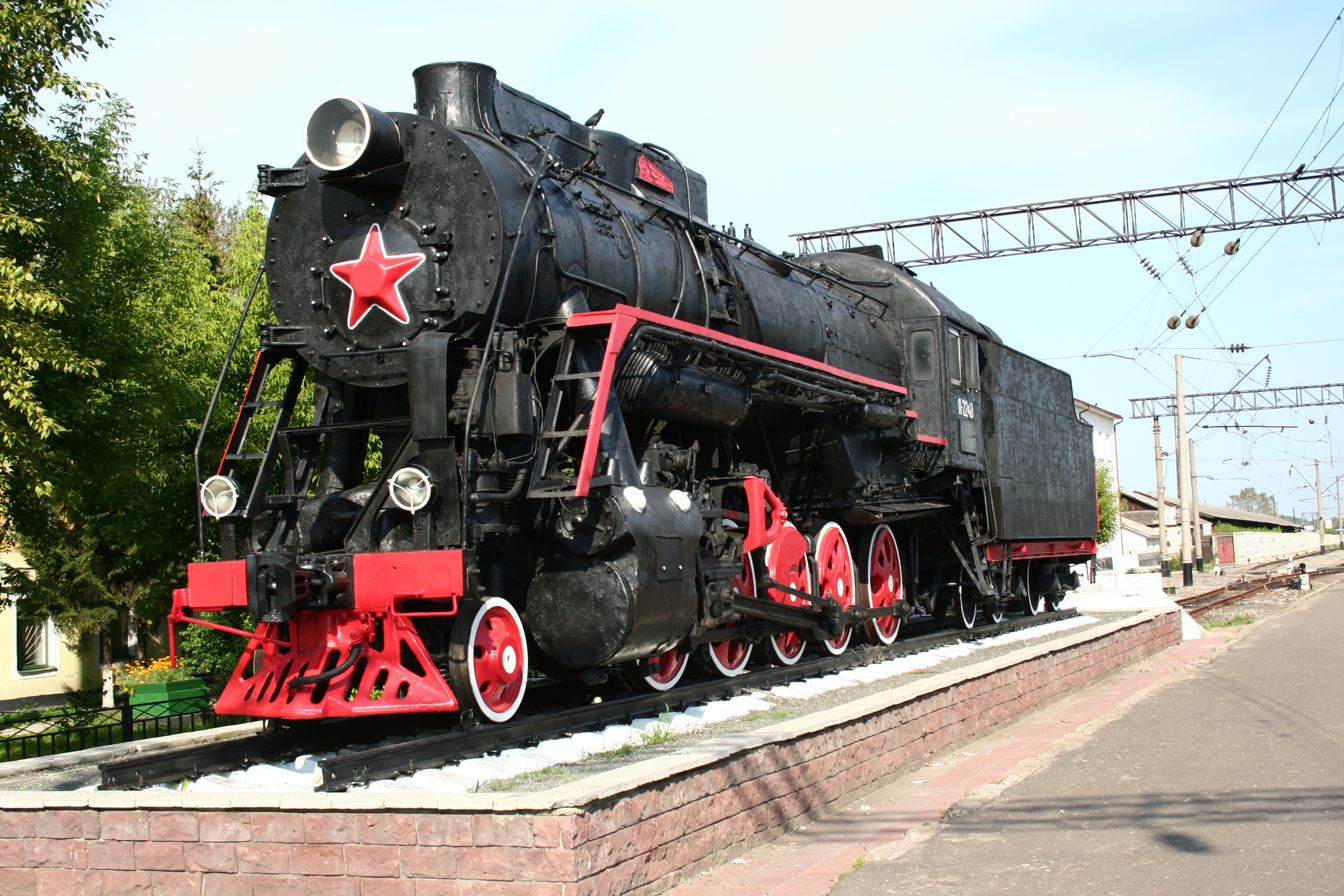
Class L

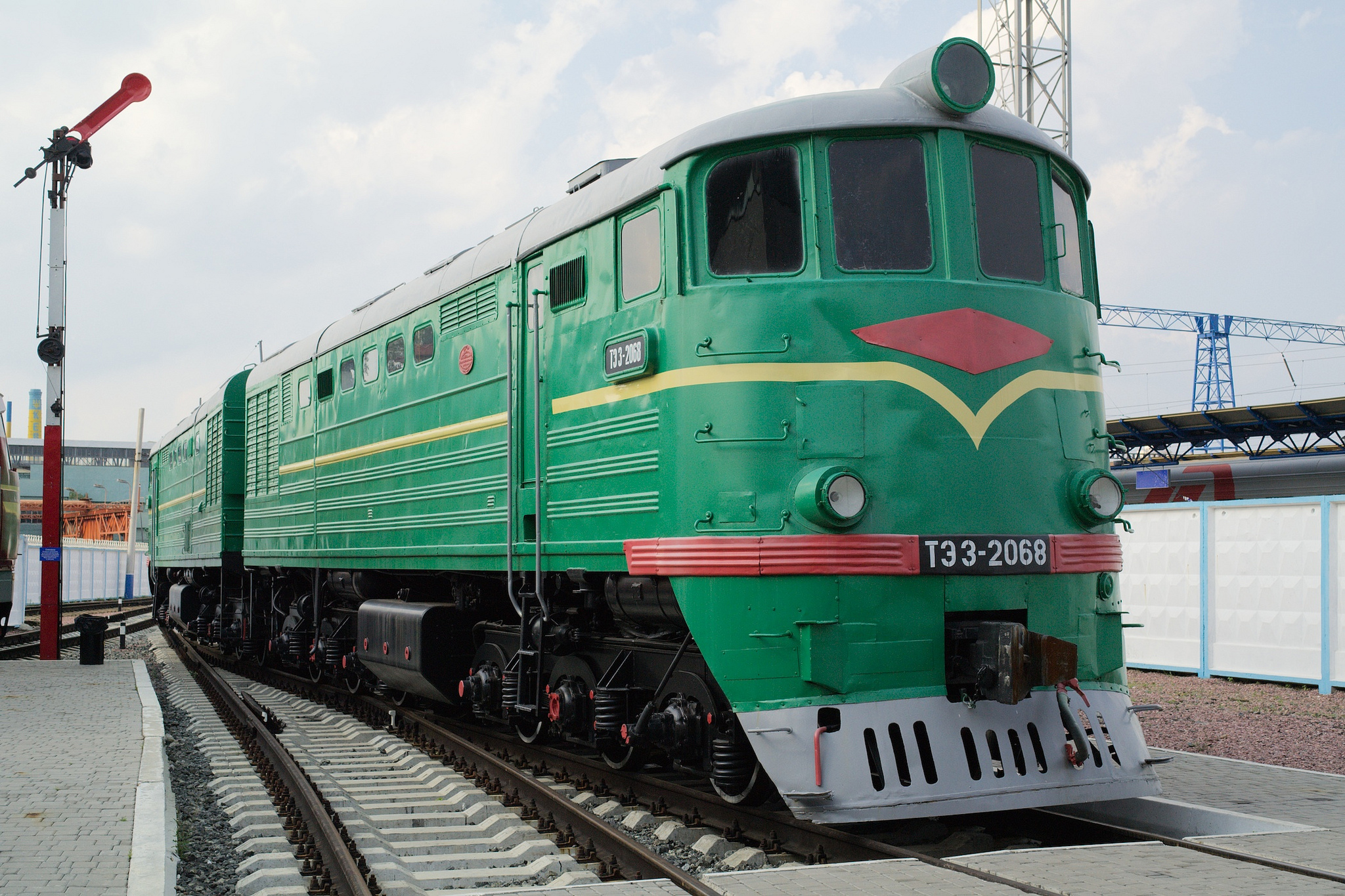
TE3

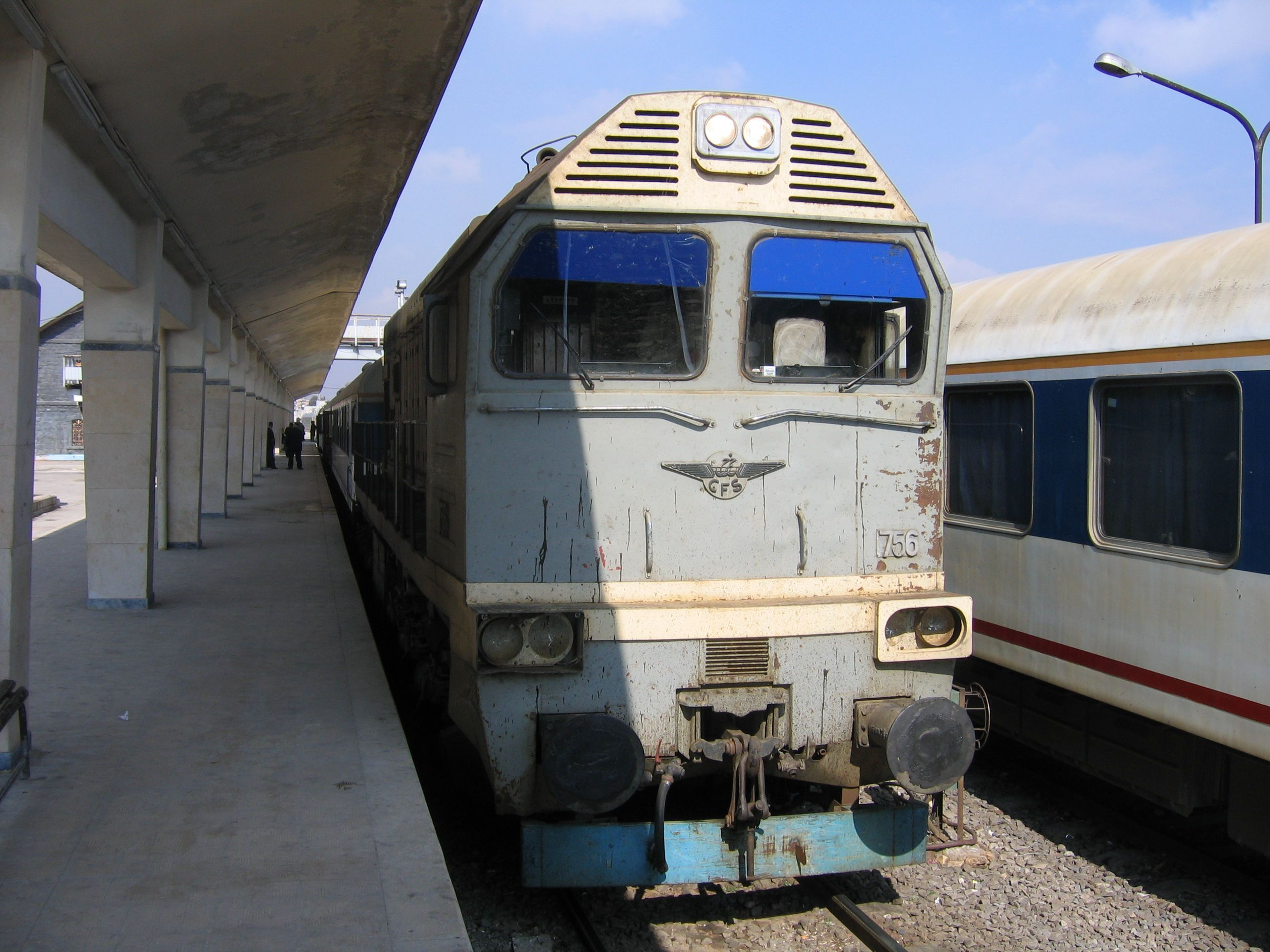
TE114 in Syria

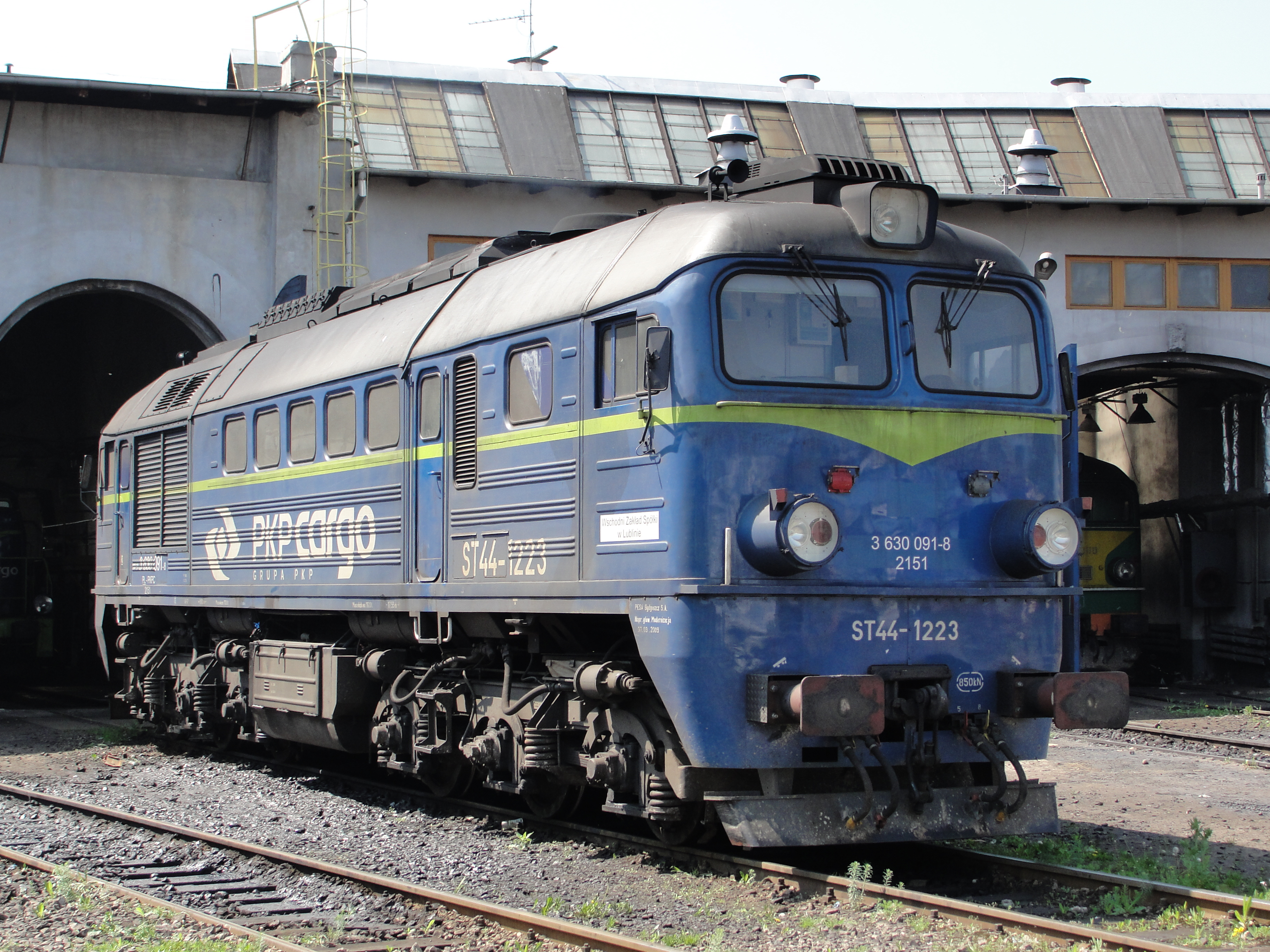
ST44 of PKP Cargo

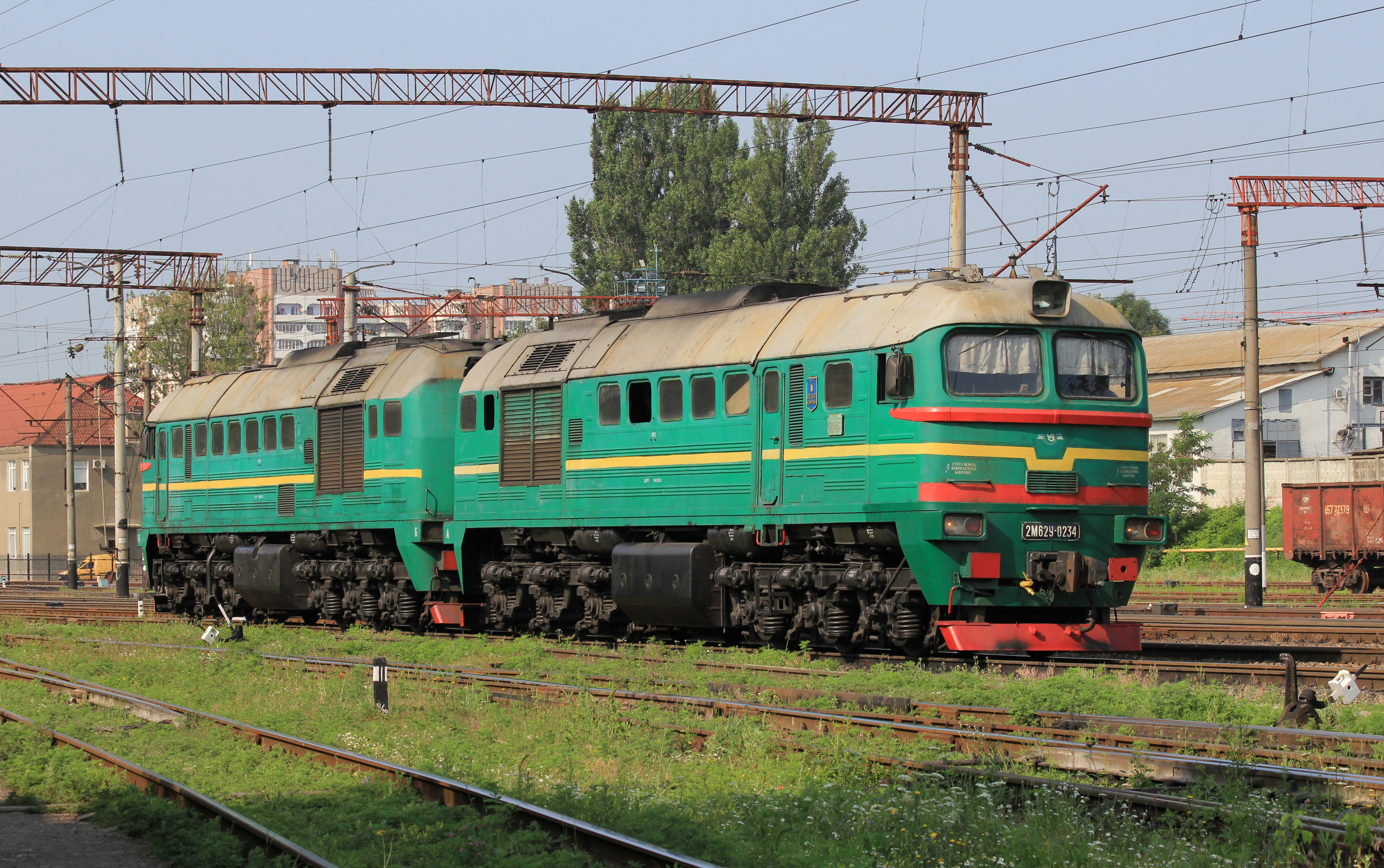
M62 locomotive, the company's most common model

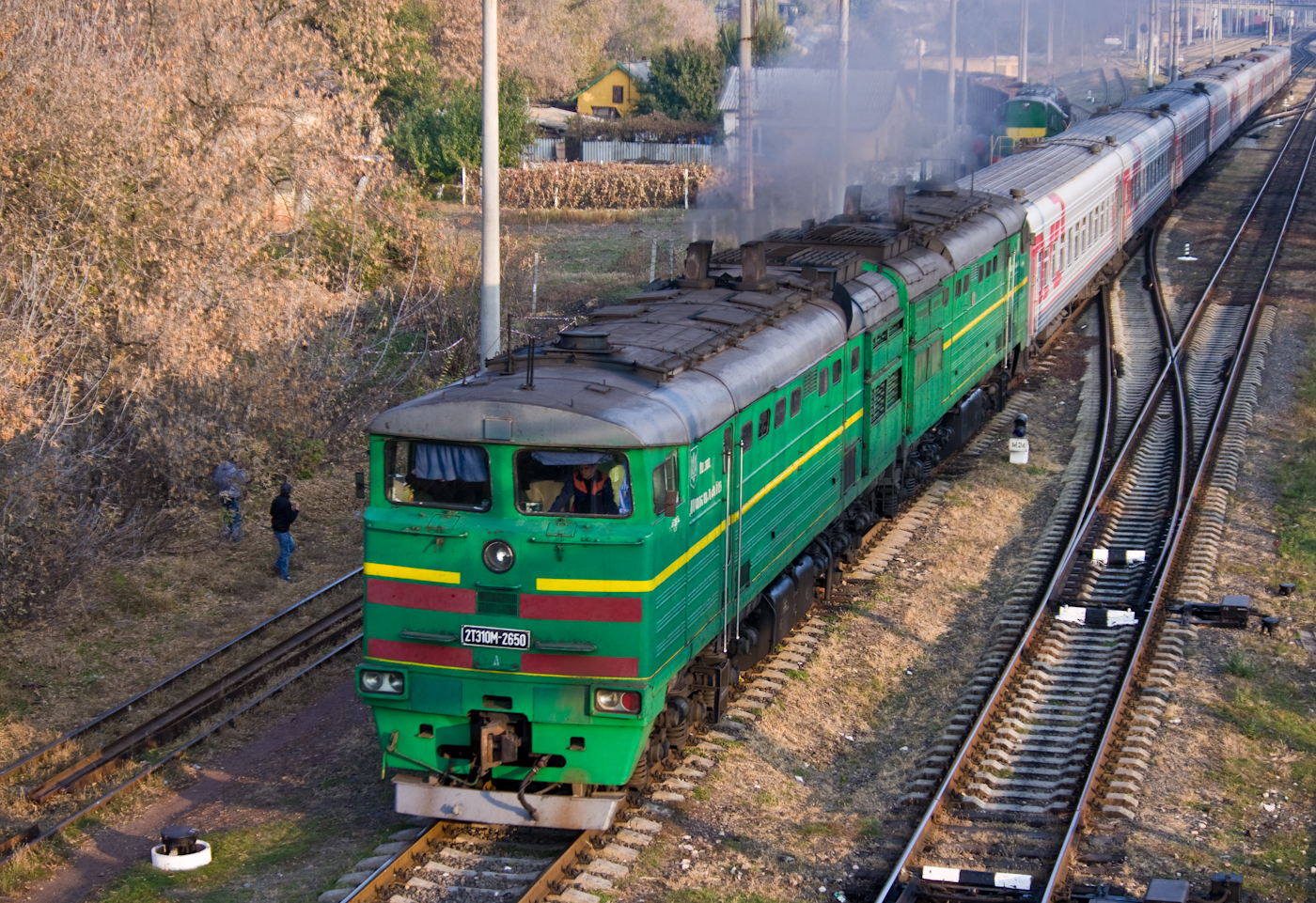
2TE10M/3TE10M

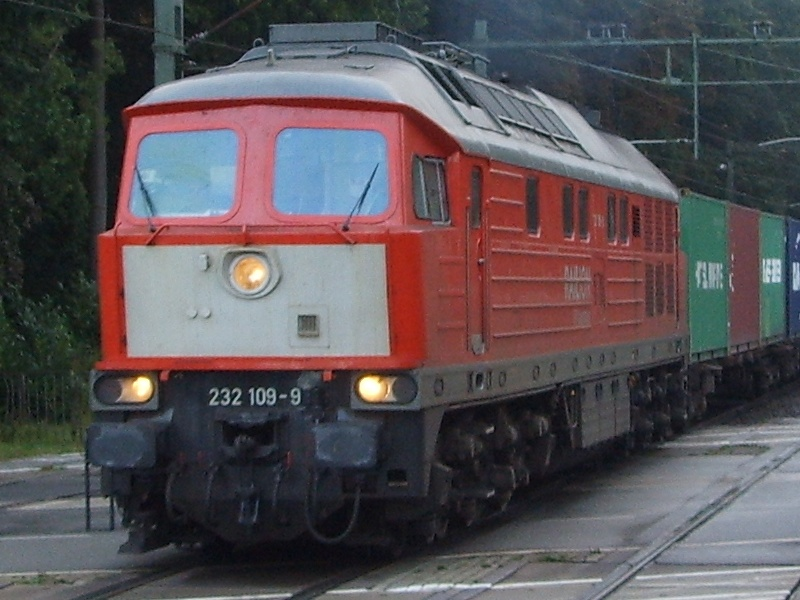
Former DR 130 (TE109) locomotive in the Netherlands

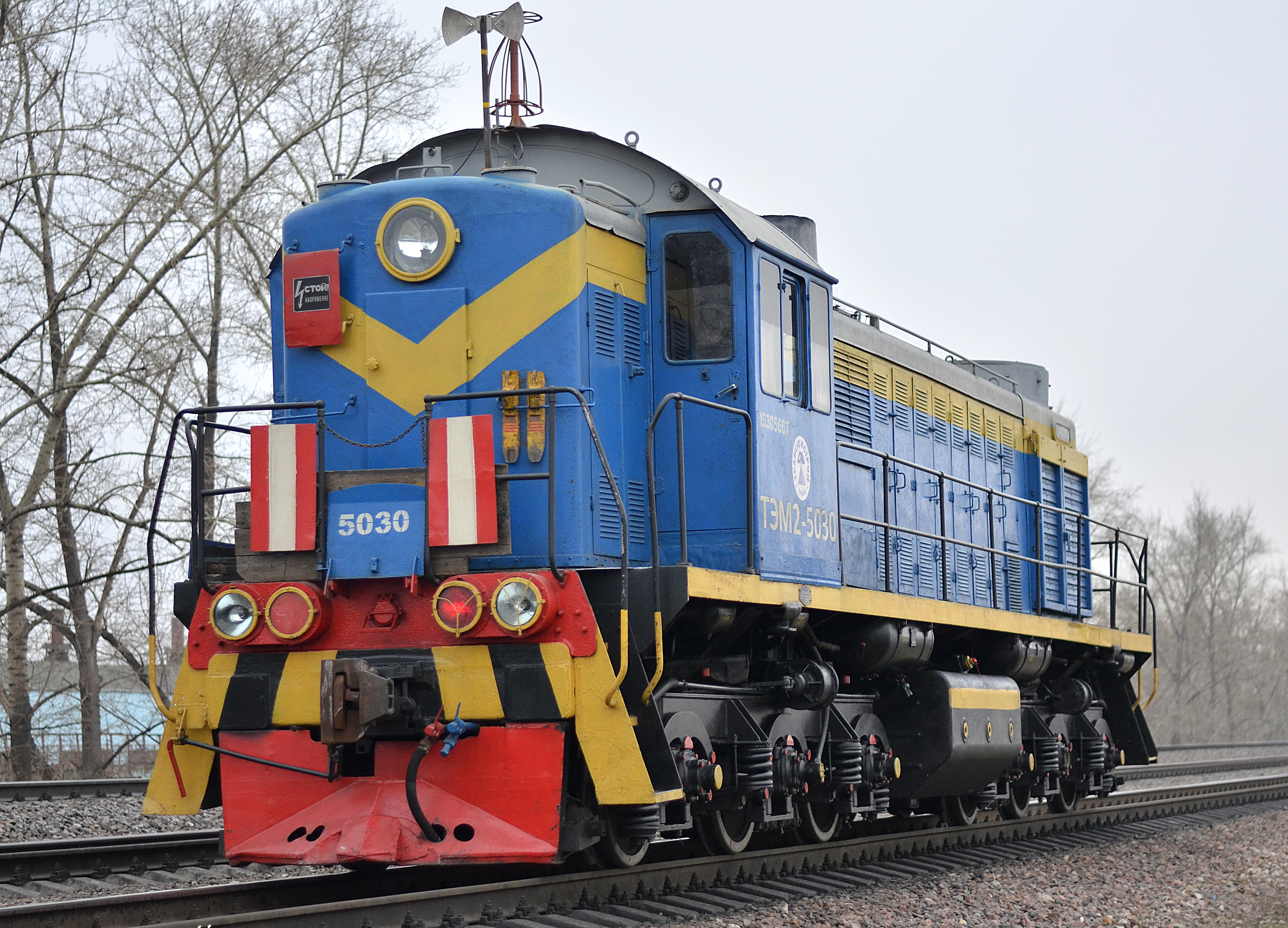
TEM2

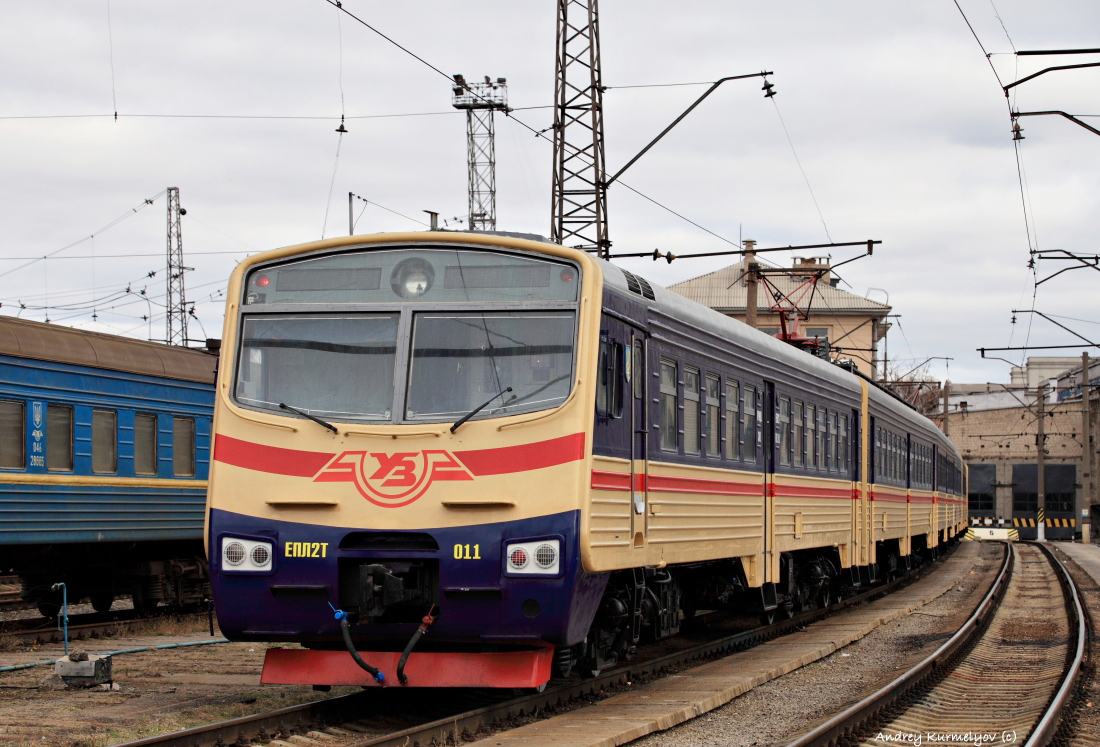
EPL2T electric multiple unit built since the 2000s.

== See also ==
- Lugcentrokuz
