= Kremenchuk Mykhailo Ostrohradskyi National University =

University in Kremenchuk, Ukraine

Coordinates: 49°03′37″N 33°24′37″E

- Кременчуцький національний університет імені Михайла Остроградського
- Type: National university
- Established: 1921
- Affiliations: Ministry of Education and Science of Ukraine
- Rector: Mykhaylo Zagirnyak
- Students: > 4,000
- Doctoral students: 51
- Location: 20 Pershotravneva Street, Kremenchuk, Poltava Oblast, 39600, Ukraine
- Campus: Urban
- Website: www.kdu.edu.ua/en/main.php
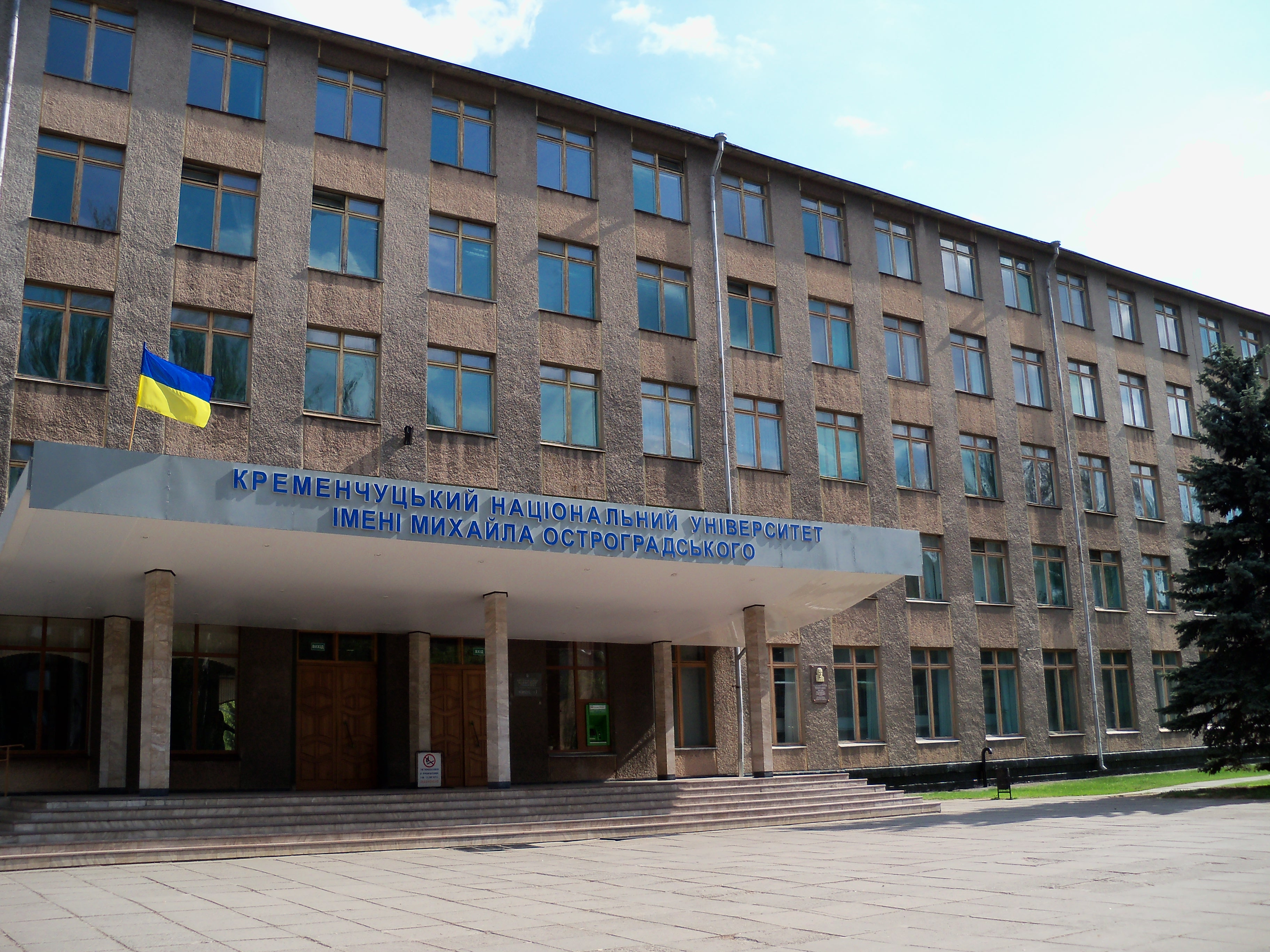

University rankings

Regional – Overall
- QS Emerging Europe and Central Asia: 301-350 (2022)

The Kremenchuk Mykhailo Ostrohradskyi National University (Ukrainian: Кременчуцький національний університет імені Михайла Остроградського) is a public university in Kremenchuk, Ukraine, the largest university in Poltava Oblast. There are over 4,000 students studying in the university as of 2013. Its current rector is Mykhaylo Zagirnyak.

== History ==
The origins of Kremenchuk Mykhailo Ostrohradskyi National University dates back to 1921. In that year the first institute of higher education was established in Kremenchuk. It offered higher educational courses with the Ukrainian language of teaching. The legal status of these courses was comparable to those offered by colleges which were considered as higher education institutions.

Later, in 1925 the courses were reorganized in Kremenchuk Pedagogical College. There were day-time and evening classes where three different departments – preschool, school, and communist education – prepared future nursery teachers, primary school teachers, and pioneer leaders.

In September 1930, by the decision of the Council of People's Commissars of Ukraine, the Kremenchuk Institute of Social Education was opened on the same basis. There was only the School faculty which consisted of four departments: agrobiological, linguo-literary, technical-mathematical, and historical-economical. The students could attend full-time, correspondence, and evening classes.

In March 1939 the Kremenchuk Teacher Training Institute was reorganized in Pedagogical. In September 1940 the institute was attended by 942 full-time and correspondence students; 208 of them were first-year students of the Pedagogical Institute. More than 100 teachers including 2 professors worked there.

Consequently, the first higher education institution in Kremenchuk existed from September 1920 till June 1941. Unfortunately, World War II interrupted the development of higher education within the city. Only in 1960 did higher education in the city resume with the creation of the general technical faculty of the Poltava Institute of Agricultural Construction Engineers. In 1972 the Faculty was subordinated to the Kharkiv Road Institute. By that time it had 854 students which were trained by 24 teachers including seven associate professors.

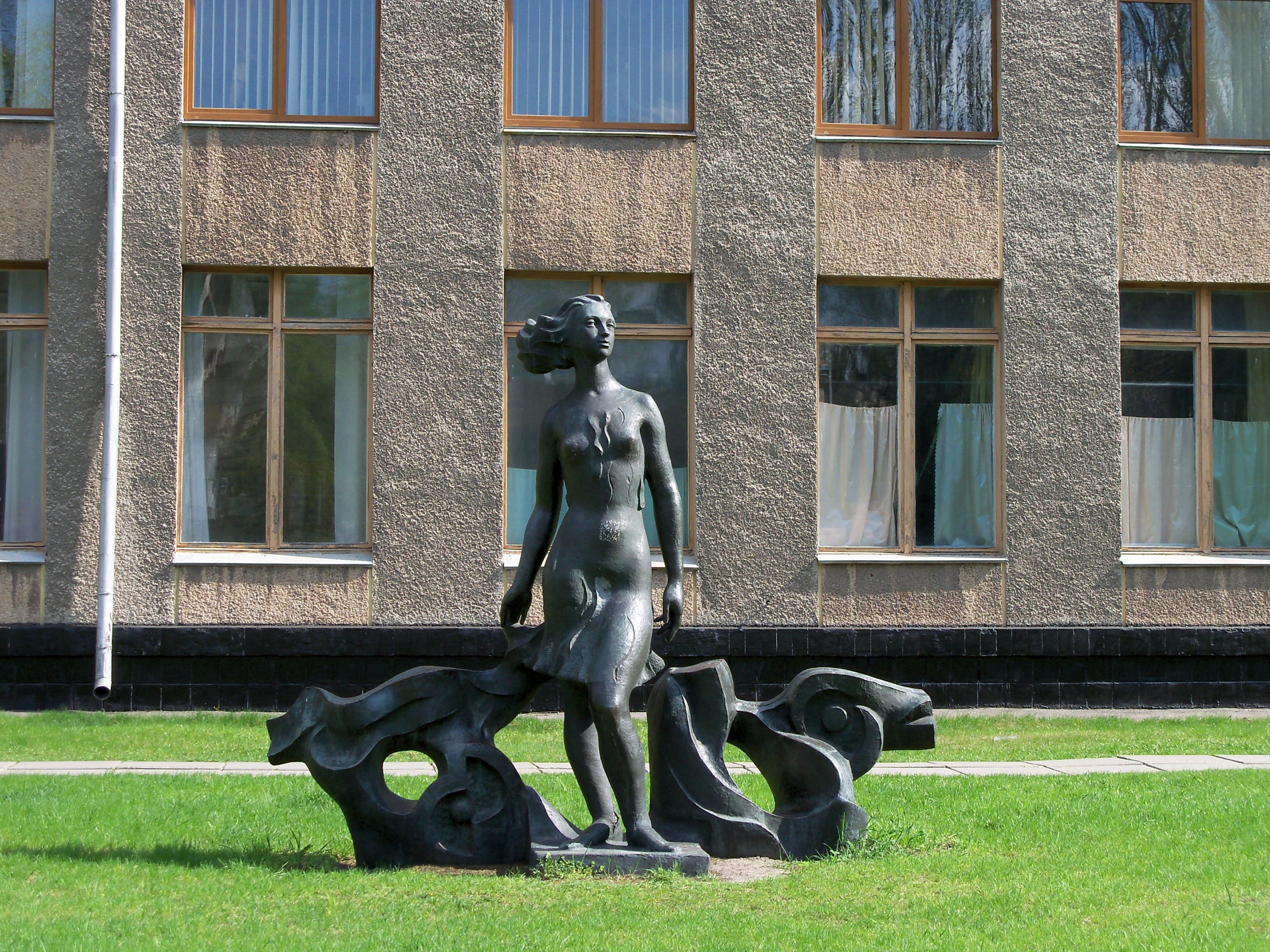
Monument near Kremenchuk Mykhailo Ostrohradskyi National University

By 1974 the number of students had increased by 2.5 times, teaching staff had trebled. Kremenchuk GTF was transformed into the Kremenchuk branch of Kharkiv State Polytechnic Institute. The work of the branch was characterised by two distinct periods: from 1974 to 1989 it offered cooperative education by either evening classes or correspondence learning and from 1989 to 1997 it offered full-time studies.

On 21 August 1997 the Cabinet of Ministers of Ukraine adopted a resolution "The formation of Kremenchuk State Polytechnic Institute" which was based on the Kremenchuk branch of Kharkiv State Polytechnical Institute, Krukiv Machine-building College, and Kremenchuk Automotive College. Professor Maslov V. Ye., who stood at the origins of the institute, was a Merited Education Worker of Ukraine, and Kremenchuk Honored Citizen, was elected to be the first rector. The institute consisted of seven faculties which included seventeen departments. Three years later the institute was reorganized in Kremenchuk State Polytechnic Institute and after another three years it was accredited as third tier higher educational institution – an acknowledgment of its ability to provide an educational process, specialist training and scientific research of the highest standards. During this time, the higher educational institution has provided industrial enterprises based in the city and Dnieper region with highly qualified specialists; creating the technical elite of the region.

In 2001 the university won in the nomination "The University of the Twenty-first Century" and was rewarded the golden medal from European Committee for Non-governmental Organizations. Later in 2001 it became a prize winner of the International Academic Ranking of Popularity and Quality "Golden Fortune" in the nomination "The Quality of the Third Millennium" and got the Certificate and the silver medal. In January 2002 KSPU won the nomination "Education" in the "Top-100 Organisations of Ukraine" ranking.

According to the "Higher Education" Law of Ukraine in November 2002 the election of a new rector took place. Among several candidates the university personnel by a majority of votes elected Mykhaylo Vasylyovych Zagirnyak — Honoured Scientist of Ukraine, Doctor of Sciences, Professor, Holder of the Order of Merit of III degree, Master of Sports.

On 21 April 2006 the State Accreditation Commission reviewed all the submitted documents and expert opinions, taking into account the university's high standards and rapid development, the Kremenchuk State Polytechnic University was awarded the accreditation level IV. That was an outstanding achievement not only for Kremenchuk State Polytechnic University, but for the whole Poltava region. The university was awarded the new, higher status that allowed students to receive a master's degree under the state demand and on a wide range of professional subjects. Such a big day came not only because of the KSPU team efforts, but due to the work of the whole city; in the past the local authorities and Kremenchuk enterprises had supported the creation of the institution of higher education.

According to the Cabinet of Ministers of Ukraine order no. 92-p of 7 March 2007, Kremenchuk State Polytechnic University was named after Mykhailo Ostrohradskyi.

In August 2009 the university became the first classical university in Poltava region. Previously having a word "polytechnic" in its name, the university was asserted as an industry-specific institution of higher education. According to the Cabinet of Ministers of Ukraine order (no. 910-p of 5 August 2009) it received the status of classical university (Kremenchuk State University, named after Mykhailo Ostrohradskyi).

On 21 August 2010, by the decree no. 863/2010 of the President of Ukraine Kremenchuk State University, named after Mykhailo Ostrohradskyi was given the national status.

In 2011 the university proved the highest accreditation level IV. In 2020 Kremenchuk Mykhailo Ostrohradskyi National University celebrated the 100th anniversary of the higher education in Kremenchuk.

== Organisation ==
The university consisted of two faculties, two institute:

Faculties/Institute	Departments
Educational and Scientific Institute of Electrical Engineering and Information Technology	Systems of Automatic Control and Electric Drive department Electrical Engineering department Computer Engineering and Electronics department Automation and Information Systems department Informatics and Higher Mathematics department
Educational and Scientific Institute of Mechanical Engineering, Transport and Natural Sciences	Mechanical Engineering department Automobiles and Tractors department Transport Technologies department Civil Safety, Labor Protection, Geodesy and Land Use department Ecology and Biotechnology department Human Health and Physical Culture department
Faculty of Economics and Management	Economics department Accounting and Finance department Management department Business Administration, Marketing and Tourism department
Faculty of Law, Humanity and Social Sciences	Basic and Branch Legal Sciences department Psychology, Pedagogy and Philosophy department Humanities, Culture and Arts department Philology and Publishing department Translation department

== International cooperation ==
The university collaborates with 75 foreign higher education institutions, research institutions in 25 countries. It cooperates with numerous foreign research, educational, industrial institutions, international educational organizations, programs and funds: ERASMUS+, TEMPUS, Horizon 2020, OPEN WORLD, DAAD, FULBRIGHT.

Since 1999 KrNU is a member of the European Association for International Education. It is also internationally connected to the US Peace Corps, the Mittweida University of Applied Sciences, Bolivarian State University, the University of Antwerp, North China Research Institute of Electronics and Optics, universities of Annaba, Ljubljana, Lublin, Mons, Bumardesa Every year students, including PhD students as well as academic staff of KrNU receive advanced international experience due to: the state programme of the Ministry of Education and Science of Ukraine "Training Students, PhD Students, Academic Staff at Leading Higher Education Institutions and Research Institutions Abroad": International PhD seminar in Gliwice and Vistula (Poland); Open World Program of American Councils on Higher Education (USA); Master and PhD Programmes at Lanzhou Jiaotong University (China); summer practice at Matej Bell University (Slovakia); cultural exchange programmes Work and Travel (USA) and Work and Travel (Germany).

On 19–20 April 2007, by the decision of the 10th Congress of the Eurasian Universities Association, Kremenchuk Mykhailo Ostrohradskyi National University was admitted to the Euroasian Universities Association.

On 21 September 2007 rector of Kremenchuk Mykhailo Ostrohradskyi National University M.V. Zagirnyak signed the Magna Charta Universitatum in Bologna (Italy).

On 24 October 2007, at the European University Association in Wroclaw (Poland), the university became a full individual member.

At the Congress of the Black Sea Universities Network "Higher Education Forum" (Kyiv, 5–8 April 2008), KrNU was enrolled to this international organization.

== Awards and reputation ==
Acknowledgement of KrNU is proved by its second place among the higher education institutions of Ukraine and a number of prize winners of the Ukrainian contest of student researches and the seventh place on the number of prize winners of the Ukrainian contests, the sixth place in TOP-10 of the higher education institutions of the Central region of Ukraine, the first place among the higher education institutions of Poltava region and the 43rd total place in the consolidated rating of the Internet-source OSVITA.UA "Ukrainian Higher Education Institution 2016" among 286 Ukrainian universities, the 56th place in TOP 200 best higher educational institutions of Ukraine held by UNESCO Department. Since 2011 the University received a lot of awards (Grand-Prize "Leader of Higher Education" and Certificate "Quality of Research Publications" on the data of SciVerseScopus in 2013; Grand-Prize "Leader of International Activity" in 2014; Grand-Prize "Leader of Scientific and Scientific-Technical Activity" and Certificate "Quality of Research Publications" in 2015) in frame of the international exhibition "Modern Education Institutions".

The university is internationally recognized according to different world rankings: QS World University Rankings (KrNU is one of 28 Ukrainian universities included herein); QS EECA Ranking Top-200 Universities in Emerging Europe and Central Asia (it is one of 14 Ukrainian universities included herein); Ranking WEB of Universities WEBOMETRICS (the 53rd place among 342 Ukrainian universities); Ranking SCIVERSE according to the international scientometric database SCOPUS (the 48th place among 136 Ukrainian universities).

Since 2005, the university takes part in the annual international exhibition "Modern Education in Ukraine" where it won three bronze medals (2006–2008); 2008 – awarded the "Leader of Modern Education"; 2009 won a gold medal for outstanding achievements in scientific and educational activities. Year 2010 brought another gold medal in the category "Introduction of Achievements of Pedagogy in Educational Practice". KrNU is a frequent member of the International exhibition "Innovations in Modern Education"; repeated participant of different competitions and winner of gold and silver medals. In these days the university researchers consistently conquer the first degree diplomas.

Since 2011 the university has been taking part in the international exhibition "Modern Education Institutions". It has won many prizes: 2013 - Grand-Prize "Leader of Higher Education" and Certificate "Quality of Research Publications" on the data of SciVerseScopus; 2014 - Grand-Prize "Leader of International Activity"; 2015 - Grand-Prize "Leader of Scientific and Scientific-Technical Activity" and Certificate "Quality of Research Publications".

== Notable alumni ==
- Ihor Kushnir – Deputy Minister of Defense, businessman, mountaineer

== See also ==
List of universities in Ukraine
