= M62 locomotive =

Soviet freight diesel locomotive

M62
- M62-1635 locomotive of Russia in Saint Petersburg in 2012
Type and origin
- Power type: Diesel–electric
- Builder: Voroshilovgrad Locomotive Works (later Luhanskteplovoz)
- Model: M62
- Build date: 1964-2001
- Total produced: ≈7,250
Specifications
- Configuration
  - AAR: C-C
  - UIC: Co′Co′
- Gauge: 1,435 mm (4 ft 8 1/2 in) standard gauge 1,520 mm (4 ft 11 27/32 in) Russian gauge
- Wheel diameter: 1,050 mm (41.34 in)
- Minimum curve: 75 m (246 ft 0.756 in)
- Wheelbase: 4.2 m (13 ft 9 in), bogie centres
  - Bogie: 4,200 mm (13 ft 9.354 in)
- Length: 17.55 m (57 ft 7 in)
- Width: 2.95 m (9 ft 8 in)
- Height: 4.493 m (14 ft 8.9 in)
- Axle load: 19.3 t (19.0 long tons; 21.3 short tons)
- Loco weight: 116.5 t (114.7 long tons; 128.4 short tons)
- Fuel type: Diesel fuel
- Fuel capacity: 3,900 L (860 imp gal; 1,000 US gal)
- Water cap.: 950 L (210 imp gal; 250 US gal)
- Sandbox cap.: 600 kg (1,300 lb)
- Fuel consumption: 340 kg/h (750 lb/h)
- Prime mover: Kolomna 14D40
- RPM
  - Maximum RPM: 750 rpm
- Engine type: Two-stroke diesel engine
- Aspiration: Roots-blown
- Displacement: Ca. 150 L (33 imp gal; 40 US gal)
- Generator: GP-312
- Traction motors: ED-107
- Cylinders: V12
- Cylinder size: 230 mm × 300 mm (9.1 in × 11.8 in)
- Transmission: Electric
- Gear ratio: 68:15
- MU working: Yes
- Loco brake: Oerlikon Air
- Train brakes: compress air brakes
- Couplers: Screw coupler SA3 coupler
Performance figures
- Maximum speed: 100 km/h (62 mph)
- Power output: 1,472 kW (1,974 hp)
- Tractive effort: 314 kN (71,000 lb_{f})
Career
- Operators: BCh, ČD, ČSD, DR, DBAG, MÁV, GySEV, PKP, RZhD, UZ, MTZ, KSR
- Class: M62 (SZhD, RZhD, MÁV, GySEV, BCh, MTZ, UZ), 781 (ČSD, ČD), T 679.1 (ČSD), V200 (DR), 120 (DR), 220 (DBAG), ST44 (PKP), K62 (KSR)
- Nicknames: See nicknames
- Locale: USSR (until 1991), Russia, Ukraine, Belarus, Moldova, Transnistria, Lithuania, Latvia, Estonia, Kazakhstan, Georgia, East Germany (until 1990), Germany, Czechoslovakia (until 1993), Czech Republic, Slovakia, Poland, Hungary, North Korea, Mongolia, Cuba, Iran

M62 (Motor (Motormozdony), 6-axle, type 2) is a class of Soviet mainline freight and passenger diesel-electric locomotives, manufactured in the USSR and Ukraine at the Voroshilovgrad Locomotive Works (later Luhanskteplovoz (LTZ)) between 1964 and 2001. The first model of the locomotive was developed for Hungarian Railways in Hungary (HNR). The locomotives were produced serially for export from 1965, and for the USSR Ministry of Railways from 1970). For deliveries to the USSR Ministry of Railways, the designation according to the standard LTZ numbering was chosen — series TE112 (diesel locomotive with electric transmission, type 112), however, the Hungarian designation was ultimately retained. The M62 became the first mainline diesel locomotive supplied by the USSR for export. In some countries (for example, in Poland, Czechoslovakia, and Hungary), these machines, designated according to their own standards, became the main locomotive series. In the 1980s, new modifications of standardized diesel locomotives appeared, usually designated with the letter U.

== History ==
=== Origins ===
In the early 1960s, the state railways of the Eastern European countries lagged behind countries such as the USA, the United Kingdom, Denmark, and the USSR in the transition to diesel traction. In 1960, a diesel locomotive from the Swedish company Nydqvist & Holm AB (NOHAB) arrived in Hungary for familiarization. This was a diesel-electric locomotive produced by this company under a license from the American company General Motors. By that time, locomotives of this family had already proven themselves well on the railways of Denmark, Norway, Belgium, and Luxembourg. The management of the Hungarian State Railways (MÁV) was interested in acquiring such machines. Soon, MÁV and NOHAB agreed on the deliveries, and in 1963, 20 locomotives of this family arrived in Hungary. Its designation, M61, was formed according to the same principle as MÁV (which is the first type of the six-axle diesel locomotive).

However, in accordance with the recommendations of the Council for Mutual Economic Assistance (COMECON), a decision was made on the necessity of building mainline diesel locomotives at Soviet factories. Therefore, for deliveries to Hungary, it was decided to entrust the Luhansk Locomotive Works (LLW) with designing a locomotive that would be less powerful and lighter than the TE10 diesel locomotive produced in the USSR.

In 1961, almost simultaneously with the beginning of cooperation between MÁV and NOHAB, the Directorate of the Locomotive Service of the Hungarian Railways and the Soviet foreign trade organization "Mashinoimport" began negotiations on the supply of diesel locomotives from the USSR. As a result, on 15 November 1963, contract No. 50/93082-464/9272 was concluded for the supply of M62 diesel locomotives. The Soviet Union acted proactively — several months earlier, on 27 February 1963, the State Committee for Heavy, Energy, and Transport Engineering had already approved the technical assignment (TA) for the design of a diesel locomotive for Hungary. The TA was coordinated with the All-Union Scientific Research Institute of Diesel Locomotives (later VNIKTI), as well as with the Central Scientific Research Institute of the Ministry of Railways (later VNIIZhT).

The technical project developed at LTZ was approved in stages by various organizations (the Donetsk Sovnarkhoz, the State Committee of the Council of Ministers of the Ukrainian SSR, and the State Committee for Heavy, Energy, and Transport Engineering) between 29 May to 29 June 1963. Even before the approval of the technical project, namely on 6 May 1963, the USSR VSNKh issued order No. 50rs, and on 13 May of the same year, the Council of Ministers of the Ukrainian SSR issued decree No. 639-72rs, according to which LTZ was required to manufacture two experimental-industrial samples (prototypes) of the M62 locomotive.

=== Production and modifications ===
The Soviet class of M62 locomotives could consist of one to three units and were supplied to various countries. the total production of these locomotives is estimated to be approximately 7,250 units.

==== Prototypes ====
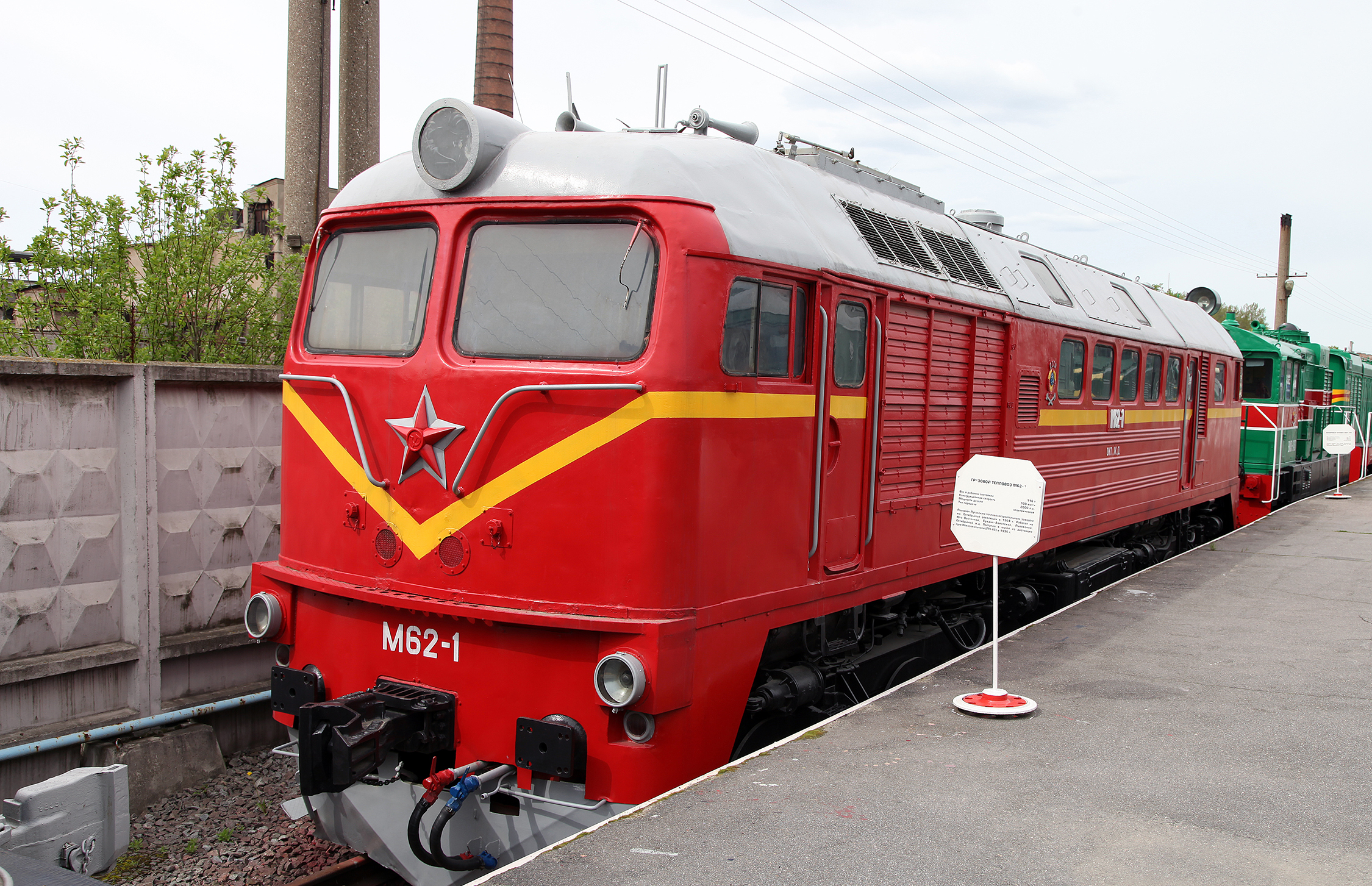
Preserved M62-1 locomotive

The first prototype locomotives were built in 1964 and were assigned with serial numbers consisting of a single digit (1 and 2). They were intended for testing on the USSR Ministry of Railways network. Thus, both the M62-1 and M62-2 were manufactured, on the one hand, taking into account the requirements of Hungarian technical specifications, and on the other hand, considering the peculiarities of service on Soviet tracks (track gauge, automatic coupler, and so on).

Before the start of state trials, various works were carried out to prepare the locomotives. For example, factory tests were conducted at the LTZ itself, as well as a running-in with an operational mileage of 5,000 km (3,100 mi). Noise and vibration levels were measured. Strength tests of the locomotive's crew section were conducted. The weight of the locomotives was determined. Bench tests of the main units and systems were carried out, as well as static and dynamic tests of the frame and body for mechanical strength. At the "Electrotyazhmash" Kharkiv plant, tests of electrical equipment components were conducted. At the Kolomna plant, interdepartmental tests of the diesel engine were carried out over 1500 hours.

Patent research was conducted with respect to the industry of Hungary, according to which the development of the M62 did not infringe upon any copyrights or patents registered in the GDR.

For the purpose of conducting state trials, it was decided to involve the Liski depot of the South Eastern Railway. On 8 June 1964, the M62-2 arrived there, where it underwent operational and maintenance tests. It hauled freight trains on the Liski–Valuyki, Liski–Povorino, and Liski–Otrochka sections. The weight of loaded trains reached between 1,800 (4,000,000) and 2,000 tonnes (4,400,000 lb), while empty trains were slightly lighter. At the same time, for dual-unit TE3 locomotives on the same sections, the weight reached between 2,800 (6,200,000) and 3,200 tonnes (7,100,000 lb). The total mileage of the M62-2 at the end of the trials amounted to 100,185 km (62,252 mi), with three minor and one major scheduled maintenance conducted.

Following the second prototype, on 18 September 1964, LTZ submitted the M62-1 diesel locomotive for state testing. It underwent traction-thermal and braking tests.

During the braking tests, a question arose regarding the conditions under which they should be conducted. Both prototype units (M62-1 and M62-2) were equipped with the Soviet braking system, whereas the units supplied to Hungary were supposed to have Knorr braking equipment, provided to LTZ by the customer. Ultimately, it was decided to subject one of the supplied units to braking tests (this was M62-002, which should not be confused with the aforementioned M62-2). Following these experiments, it was concluded that the braking system met the requirements specified in the technical conditions; however, skidding could occur under adverse weather conditions. The commission attributed this phenomenon to the characteristics of the Knorr braking system.

Another weak point of the diesel locomotive was the noise level. Initially, measurements were conducted on the M62-1. The export model M62-002 received cabs with improved sound insulation, and noise level measurements were also carried out on it. However, even in this case, the required results were not achieved. The indicators decreased to 92.5 dB in Cab A and 95.0 dB in Cab B, while according to the technical specifications, the noise level in the driver's cab should not exceed 82.0 dB. The commission suggested that LTZ discuss this issue with the Hungarian side, pointing out that for locomotives of the USSR and other CMEA countries, the obtained indicators are considered normal, and that reducing them to the level specified in the technical conditions on the diesel locomotive of this category produced in the USSR at that time was practically impossible. At the same time, it was proposed to clarify the standard for the noise level outside the locomotive, which was recommended to be set at approximately 100 dB — taking into account the conducted tests.

The Act of Acceptance of the diesel locomotives (which is on the completion of testing) was approved on 31 March 1965, by the Deputy Chairman of the State Committee for Heavy, Power, and Transport Engineering under the USSR State Planning Committee, M. N. Shchukin. It stated: "The State Commission considers the presented pilot-industrial samples of the M62 diesel locomotive to be accepted for industrial production and for the supply of M62 diesel locomotives for export." From that moment, serial production of the locomotive could begin, which started in the same year; initially, only export modifications were built.

Both locomotives remained in service in the USSR.

==== Export modifications ====
The locomotives of the series mainly differed in the design of individual units and assemblies (depending on the requirements of specific operators), for example, the profiles of wheelset tires, buffer lights, shock-tension devices, safety and radio communication systems, and so on. Overall, the technical specifications per section were identical.

Typically, locomotives were delivered under a designation assigned according to the rules of the specific operator; the system of sequential (operational) numbers was also individual to them. At the same time, LTZ maintained a general record of the units. For example, the first batch of locomotives for Hungarian State Railways (MÁV) (consisting of 52 machines) was designated from 001 to 052, and the next batch (of four machines) was delivered to the Polish operator, Polish State Railways (PKP) designated from 001 to 004. At the same time, these four locomotives had factory numbers following the first (Hungarian) batch, namely 053, 054, 055, and 056 (the sequential numbers for MÁV from 001 to 052 coincided with the factory numbers).

The locomotives were supplied primarily to the countries of Eastern Europe. The largest number of locomotives (1191 units) was received by PKP. A preparation point was built at the Korolyovo depot of the Lviv Railway for the transfer of locomotives. The arriving diesel locomotives were decommissioned, and in the case of deliveries for operation on the standard gauge, they were transferred onto prepared bogies, after which they were handed over to the receiving party. Subsequently, the diesel locomotives proceeded to the border station Chop, from where they were distributed to their destinations.

===== M62 for MÁV and GYSEV (Hungary) =====
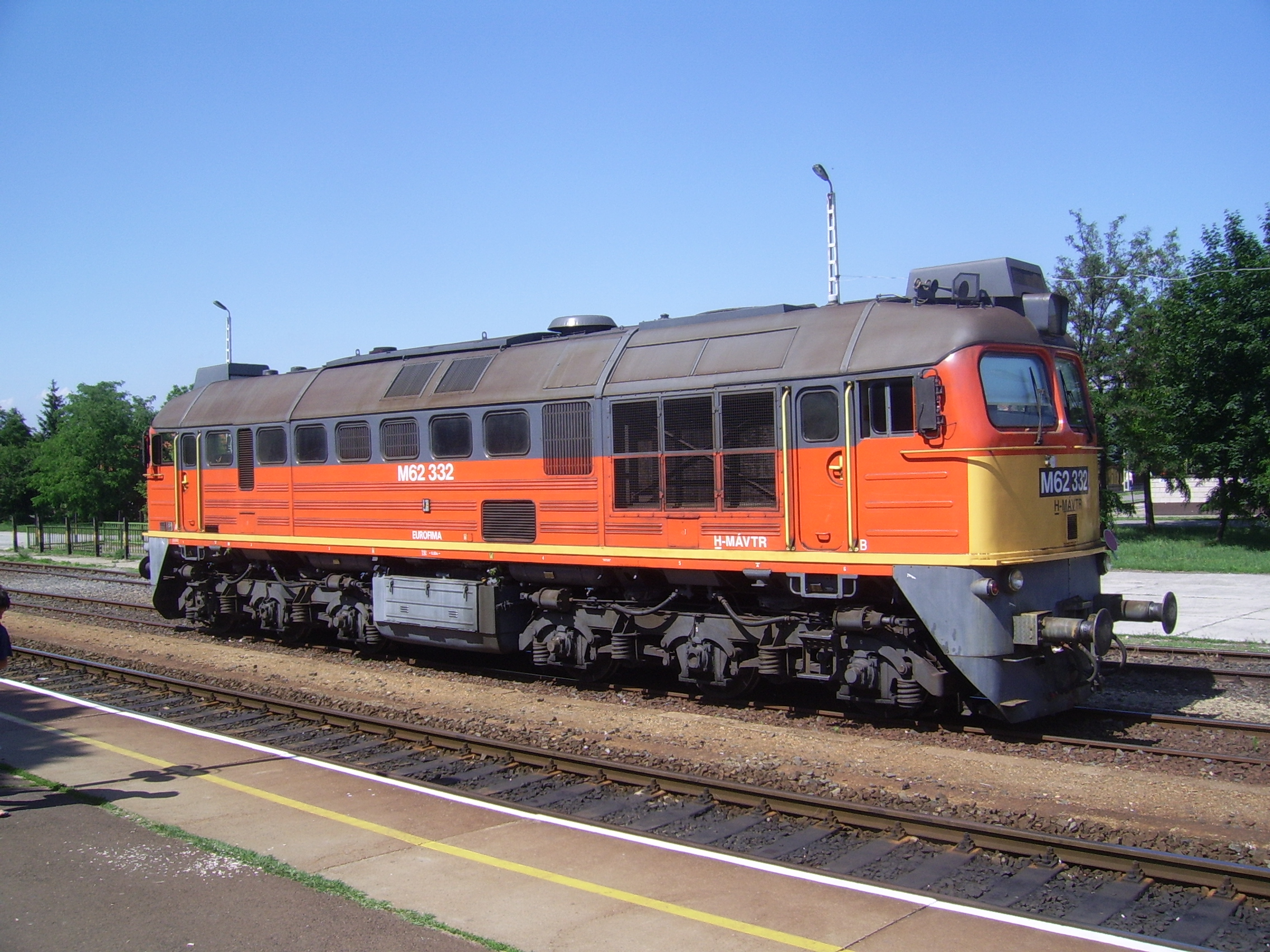
M62-332 at Ócsa railway station

The first modification, which was produced serially, was supplied to Hungary under the designation M62, with serial numbers starting from 001 (which the first two locomotives in the shipment were designated as M62-001 and M62-002, the presence of two zeros in the number distinguished them from the prototype-industrial M62-1 and M62-2). The first locomotive (M62-001) was handed over to MÁV representatives on 27 April 1965. Some locomotives were supplied to MÁV with Russian-gauge bogies for operation on broad-gauge sections within Hungary. Part of the standard-gauge machines was supplied for the Hungarian railway company, Győr–Sopron–Ebenfurti Vasút (GYSEV). This was reflected in the numbering series of the M62 locomotives supplied to the Hungarian People's Republic. Locomotives with 1435 mm gauge bogies for MÁV ultimately received numbers from 001 to 270 (a total of 270 units, built from 1965 to 1968 and from 1971 to 1974). Locomotives with 1524 mm gauge bogies received numbers from 501 to 518 (a total of 18 units, built in 1970, 1974, and 1978). Locomotives for GYSEV had 1435 mm gauge bogies and were assigned numbers from 901 to 906 (a total of six units, built in 1972). Thus, a total of 294 (270 with the additional 18 and 6) locomotives of the series were supplied to Hungary.

===== ST44 for PKP along with M62 (Poland) =====
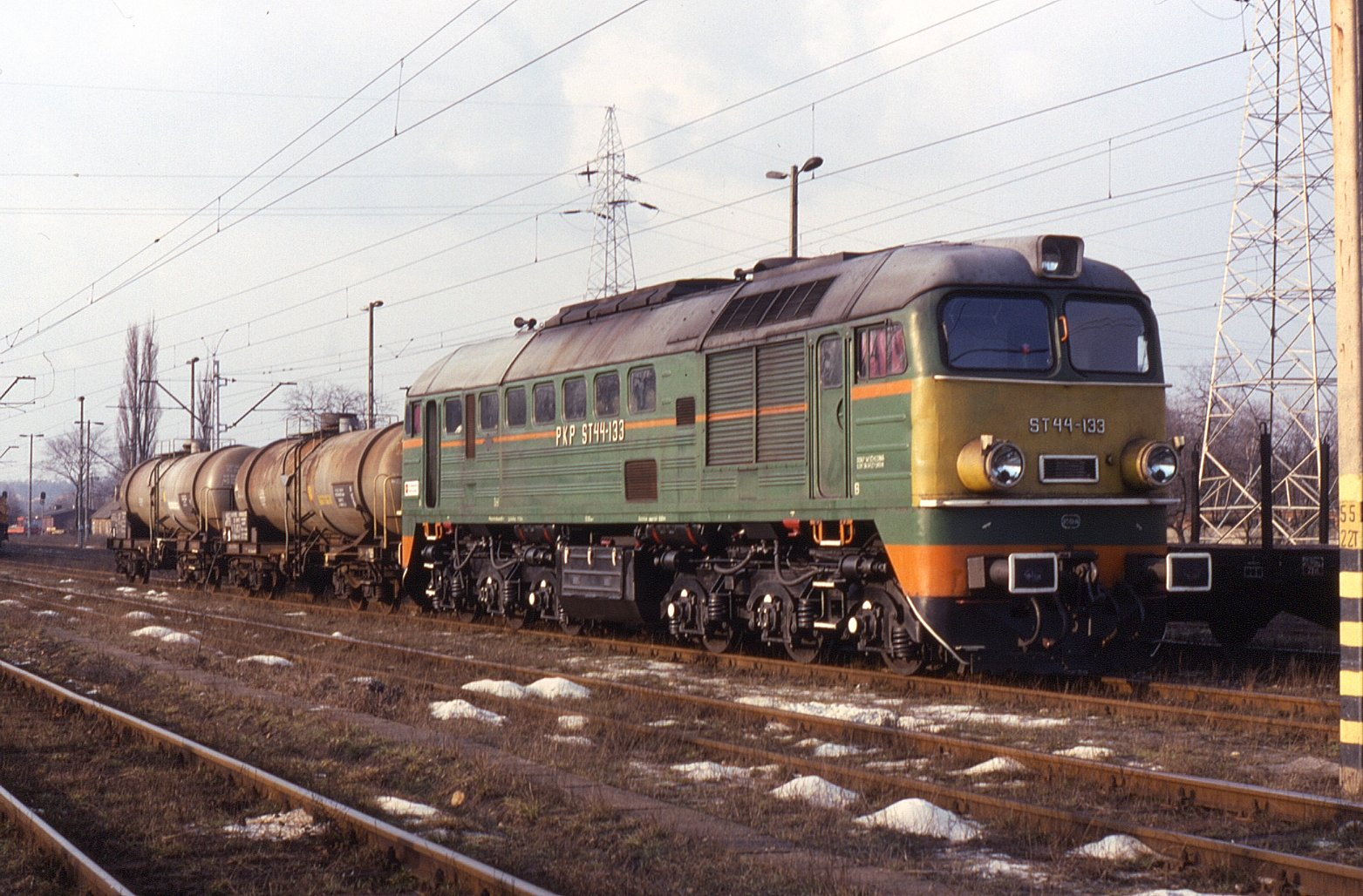
ST44-133 in Tomaszów Mazowiecki

The next country for which the M62 was prepared was Poland (the Polish People's Republic). As in the case of the Hungarian People's Republic, some of the locomotives were supplied with Russian-gauge bogies. A distinctive feature of most locomotives for Poland was the large-diameter round buffers, comparable in size to a spotlight, in accordance with the then-current requirements for rolling stock headlights in Poland. These were positioned above the main frame level at the middle height of the cab, rather than at the top of the pilot directly above the buffers, as on other locomotives of the series. The first locomotives of the series, designated ST44 according to the rules of the Polish State Railways classification, were built as early as 1965; the first of them (ST44-001) arrived in Poland on 4 January 1966. The distribution of ST44 numbers was as follows. Locomotives for operation on the 1435 mm track gauge were assigned numbers from 001 to 1113, as well as a separate number 1500, which was given to the experimental ST44 with jawless bogies (a total of 1114 units were built between 1965 and 1988). Broad-gauge locomotives received numbers from 2001 to 2068 (a total of 68 units were built between 1977 and 1980). In addition, for industrial railways in Poland, M62 locomotives for the 1435 mm gauge were delivered, receiving two-digit numbers (from 01 to 09), unlike the prototypes (with single-digit numbers) and the first units for the VNR (with three-digit numbers). A total of nine such units were delivered, built between 1972 and 1979. Thus, a total of 1191 (1114 with the additional 68 and 9) locomotives of the series were delivered to Poland.

===== T679.1 and T679.5 for ČSD (Czechoslovakia) =====
T679.1 1168 in Dolný Harmanec

Since 1966, the production and delivery of locomotives of the series for Czechoslovakia (Czechoslovak Socialist Republic) began. The designation was assigned according to the rules of the Czechoslovak State Railways (ČSD). The situation with their distribution across the country is generally similar to that in Poland (locomotives were delivered for both the 1435 mm gauge (ČSD class T679.1) and 1524 mm gauge (ČSD class T679.5), and a separate batch was intended for industrial lines). However, unlike the M62 for the Polish industry, the industrial prototypes for Czechoslovakia had Russian-gauge bogies and carried the same series designation as for ČSD (that is T679.5). The T679.1 locomotives were numbered from 001 to 374 and from 400 to 600 (a total of 575 units, built from 1966 to 1979). The T679.5 locomotives were numbered from 001 to 027, with the first 25 numbers belonging to the 1966 batch built for general use, and the last two numbers of this sequence assigned for industrial use. Thus, a total of 602 (575 with the additional 25 and 2) locomotives of the series were delivered to Czechoslovakia (600 units for general use and two for industrial purposes).

===== V200 for DR (120 DR, 220 DB) (East Germany) =====
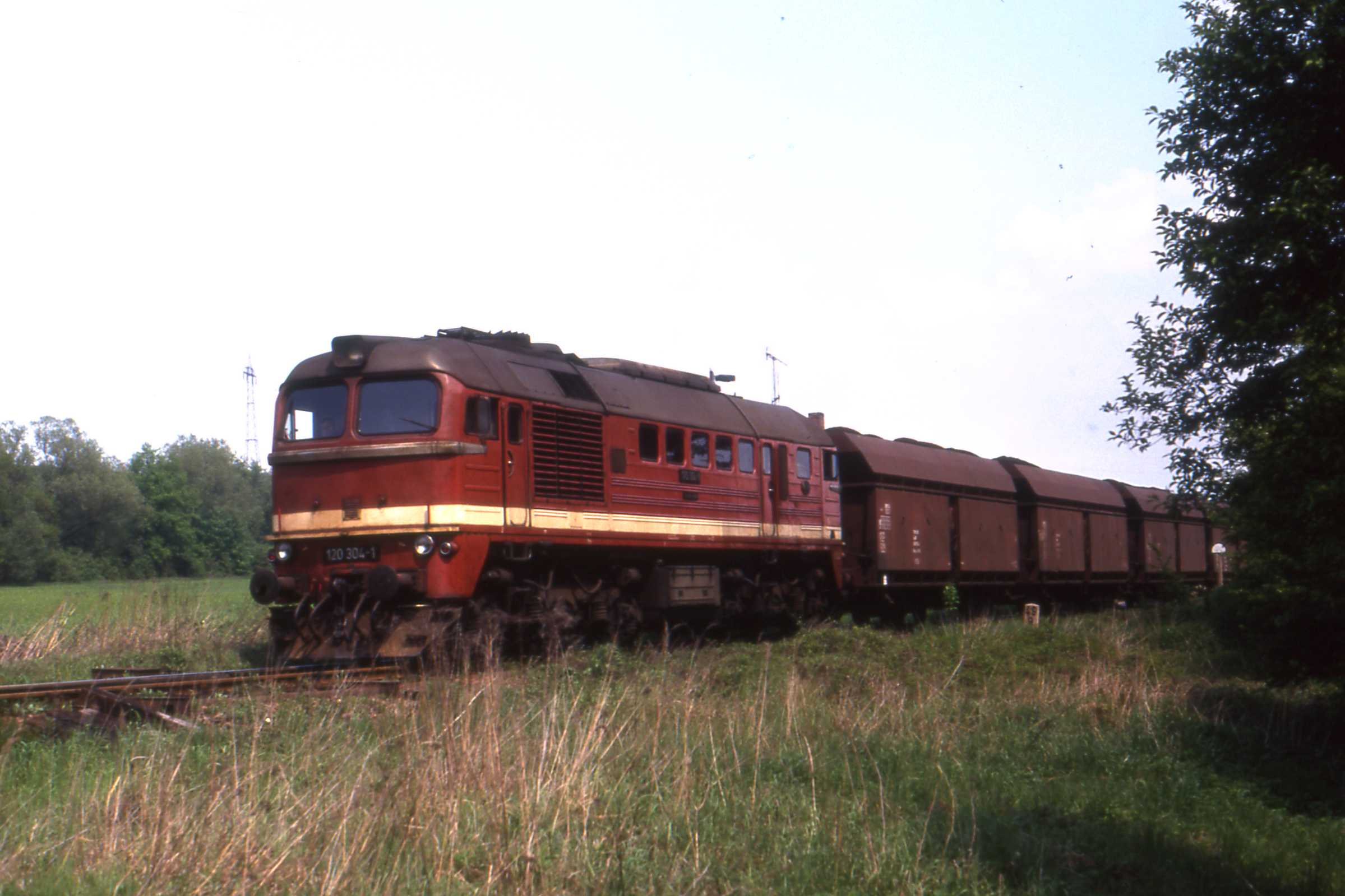
120 304-1 with a coal train in Wetterzeube

In 1966, LTZ began to build and supply a version of the locomotive for East Germany. The deliveries were intended both for the railways of East Germany (Deutsche Reischbahn) and for industrial lines, but this time all locomotives were supplied for the 1435 mm gauge. Under the DR system, the locomotives were initially designated as class V200; in later deliveries, the locomotives were designated as class 120 due to a change in the operator's designation system (many previously supplied units were renumbered to the new class). Locomotives for general use received numbers from 001 to 378 (that is 378 units, built between 1966 and 1970 and between 1973 and 1975). Industrial locomotives (18 diesel locomotives built between 1971 and 1973 and between 1976 and 1977) were assigned numbers 501 and above, with some numbers being duplicated. Initially, a batch of five units (numbered from 501 to 505) was delivered to the SDAG Wismut enterprise. The next batch of three units was intended for the BKK Geiseltal company, where they eventually went, and they received numbers following the previous batch (that is from 506 to 508). This was followed by another delivery to SDAG Wismut, with numbers assigned without accounting for those delivered to BKK Geiseltal (again from 506 to 515, resulting in numbers 506 to 508 being duplicated). Thus, a total of 396 (378 with the additional 18 and 396) ocomotives of the series were delivered to East Germany. (Note: Information about East German locomotives is taken from the German version of this article.)

===== IR62 for IRIR (Iran) =====
In 1967, two experimental diesel locomotives were built for the Islamic Republic of Iran Railways (IRIR), which became the first M62 series variant with a tropical configuration. This variant was designated IR62, with the assignment of numbers 001 and 002. Another distinction of this model was the 11D40 diesel engine with reduced power of 1,323 kW (1800 hp). The IR62 was built for a 1435 mm gauge. In Iran, the locomotives were used on the Tehran–Tabriz section. Although overall they demonstrated operability in the Iranian climate, the cooling system did not fully manage to ensure reliable operation of the units. Serial deliveries of the IR62 did not follow; however, already in the post-Soviet period, dual-unit 2M62U locomotives were supplied to Iran, generally similar to those supplied to the USSR and post-Soviet states, but on the European gauge (built between 1998 and 2001). It is known that about 10 locomotives were supplied.

===== 내연 (K62) for the Korean State Railway (North Korea) =====
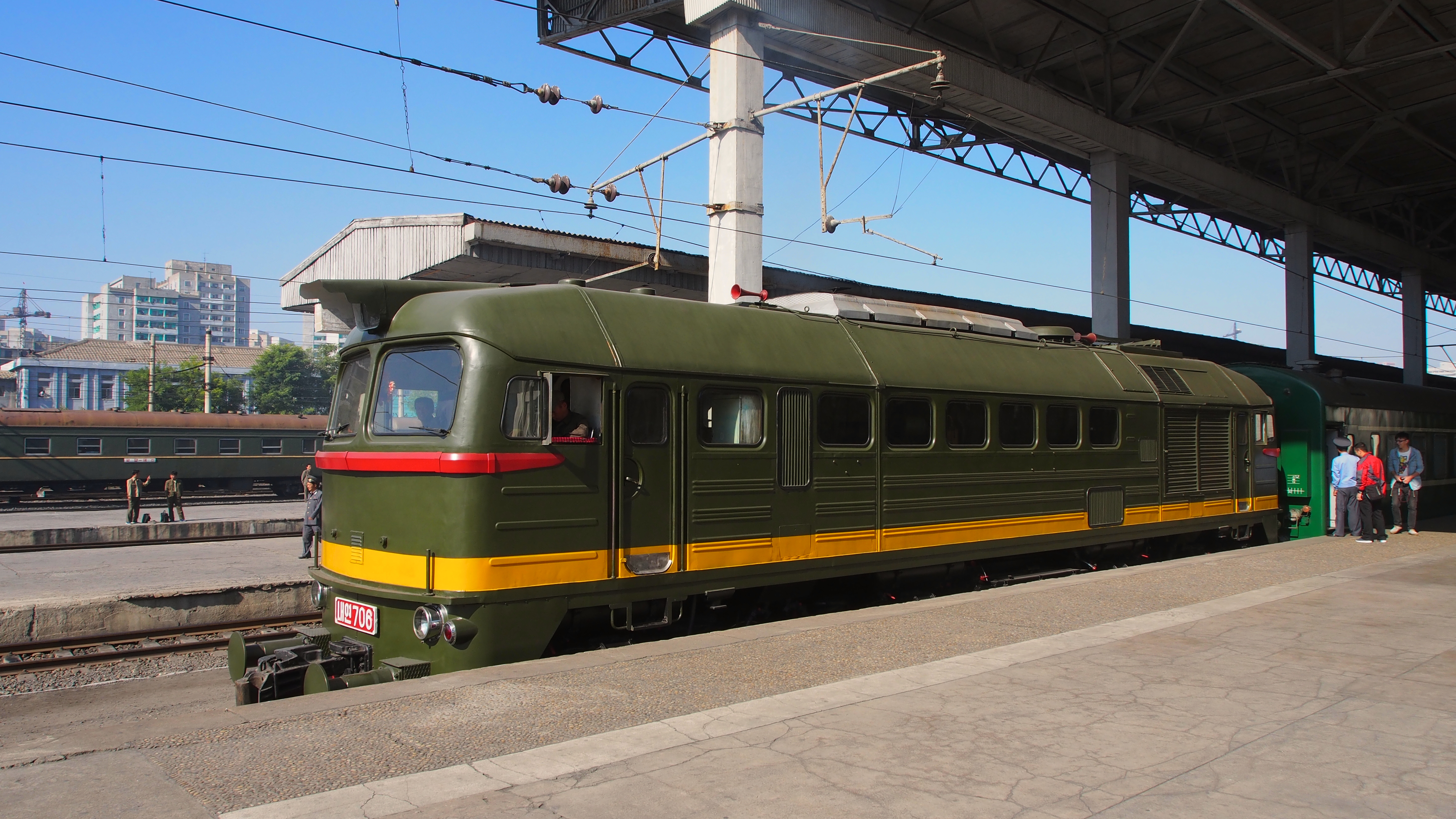
내연-706 in Pyongyang

Almost simultaneously with the development of the IR62 for Iran, the development of a variant for the Korean State Railway in North Korea (DPRK) began. Some locomotives were supplied with Russian-gauge bogies to allow operation on border sections. Similar to the IR62, the locomotives received a factory designation (K62), but on the railways of the DPRK they were operated under the designation 내연 (naeyon) which translates to "Internal Combustion". Between 1967 and 1974, 48 locomotives were built for standard gauge; in 1973, a batch of five locomotives with Russian gauge appeared. It is also known that between 1990 and 1995, improved versions of the locomotives (with jawless bogies) were built for the DPRK, classified by the factory as K62U; about 10 units were supplied.

===== K-5XX for FCC (616XX FCC, M62K) (Cuba) =====
M62K 61606 in Cuba

From 1974 to 1975, the locomotives of the series were built for Ferrocarriles de Cuba (FCC). A total of 20 units were produced at LTZ. The locomotives were given the factory designation M62K. Initially, the locomotives were delivered as K series and had numbers from 501 to 520 (the designation was applied with a hyphen; the first locomotive had a nameplate with the inscription K-501). Later, the designation was changed to 61.6 (or 61.6XX, where XX is a number from 01 to 20). There were no dots on the locomotive's number plate (for example, the second locomotive of the series had the inscription 61602). In 1990, another locomotive of the same series was produced in this country (61.621). The design incorporated elements from several older 61.6 locomotives.

===== 2M62M and M62M for MTZ (Mongolia) =====
2M62MM-009 with a freight train leaves Mongolia

From 1980 to 1987, dual-unit 2M62M diesel locomotives were built for the railways of Mongolia (MTZ), generally identical to the 2M62 for the USSR Ministry of Railways, which had already been mastered by that time. A total of 66 such machines were built for Mongolia, numbered from 001 to 066.

Later, single-unit M62UM locomotives were prepared for Mongolia. It is known that between 1989 and 1991, 16 locomotives of this type (numbers from 001 to 016) were built and delivered.

===== Locomotive export figures =====
| Country | Operator | Track gauge | Designation | Build date | Total built | Fleet numbering | Notes |
|---|---|---|---|---|---|---|---|
| Hungary | MÁV | 1435 mm | M62 | 1965–1968, 1971–1974 | 270 | from 001 to 270 | |
| Hungary | MÁV | 1520 mm | M62-5XX | 1970, 1974, 1978 | 18 | from 501 to 518 | |
| Hungary | GYSEV | 1435 mm | M62-9XX | 1972 | 6 | from 901 to 906 | |
| Poland | PKP | 1435 mm | ST44 | 1965–1988 | 1114 | from 001 to 1113 and 1500 | ST44-1500 locomotive had jawless bogies |
| Poland | PKP | 1520 mm | ST44 | 1977–1980 | 68 | from 2001 to 2068 | |
| Poland | Petrochemia Płock | 1435 mm | M62 | 1972–1979 | 6 | from 01 to 06 | |
| Poland | PMP–PW | 1435 mm | M62 | 1972–1979 | 3 | from 07 to 09 | |
| Czechoslovakia | ČSD | 1435 mm | T679.1, later 781 | 1966–1979 | 575 | from 001 to 374 and from 400 to 600 | |
| Czechoslovakia | ČSD | 1520 mm | T679.5, later 781.8 | 1966 | 25 | from 001 to 025 | |
| Czechoslovakia | Stahlwerk Košice | 1520 mm | T679.5 | – | 2 | 026, 027 | |
| East Germany | DR | 1435 mm | V200, later 120 | 1966–1970, 1973–1975 | 378 | from 001 to 314 for V200, from 315 to 378 for 120, after the designation changed: from 001 to 378 for 120 | |
| East Germany | SDAG Wismut | 1435 mm | V200 | 1971–1973. 1976–1977 | 15 | from 501 to 515 | |
| East Germany | BKK Geiseltal | 1435 mm | V200 | 1973 | 3 | from 506 to 508 | |
| Iran | IRIR | 1435 mm | ИР62 | 1967 | 2 | 001, 002 | |
| Iran | IRIR | 1435 mm | 2М62У | 1998–2001 | ≈10 | – | |
| North Korea | Korean State Railway | 1435 mm | 내연 (K62) | 1967–1974 | 48 | – | |
| North Korea | Korean State Railway | 1524 mm | 내연 (K62) | 1973 | 5 | – | |
| North Korea | Korean State Railway | 1435 mm | 내연 (K62У) | 1990–1995 | ≈10 | – | |
| Cuba | FCC | 1435 mm | K-5XX (M62K), later 616XX | 1974, 1975 | 20 | from 501 to 520 for K-5XX, later from 61601 to 61620 | Later, the number 61621 (formerly 61603 or 61614) was assigned after the locomotive was restored. |
| Mongolia | MTZ | 1520 mm | 2М62М | 1980–1987 | 66 | from 001 to 066 | |
| Mongolia | MTZ | 1520 mm | М62УМ | 1989–1991 | 16 | from 001 to 016 | |

==== USSR modifications ====
===== M62 (TE112, M62C) =====
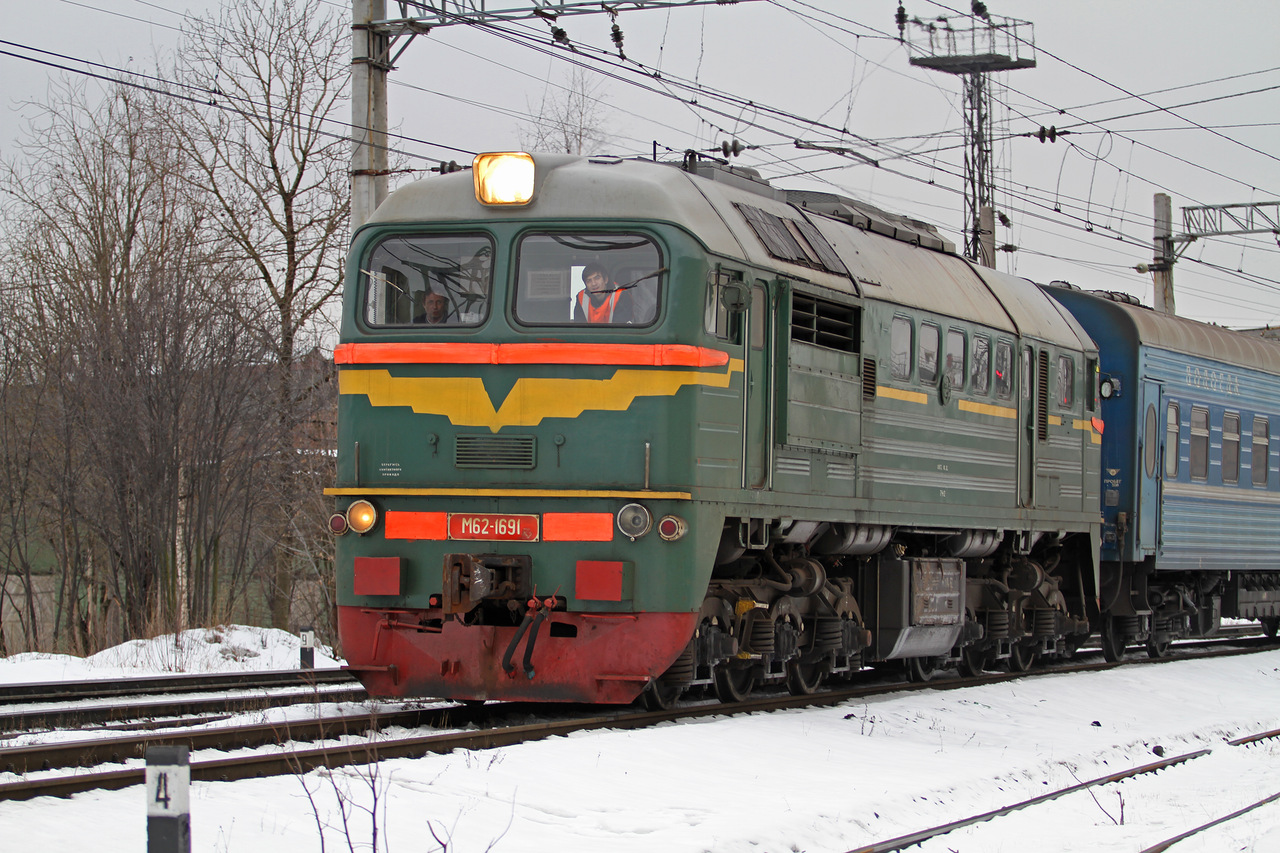
M62-1691 at Tsvetochnaya Station in St. Petersburg

In 1970, the same plant, now known as the Voroshilovgrad Plant named after the October Revolution (VZOR), began producing the M62 for the Soviet Ministry of Railways. A designation in the class customary for the Soviet Union was prepared for this variant (in this case TE112); however, for unknown reasons, it was decided to retain the Hungarian designation. In some technical documents, the locomotive was designated M62S (S stood for "Soviet"). To distinguish the batch from other M62 locomotives, these locomotives were assigned numbers in the 1XXX format, with the first locomotive receiving the number 1003 instead of 1001 (the experimental M62-1 and M62-2 remained in service in the USSR). Production began in 1970 and ended in 1976. The last number for this modification was 1723. Thus, a total of 723 locomotives were built, of which 721 were serially produced. Later, a batch of machines was also built, labeled on the plate as M62 (with sequential numbering, starting from number 1724), but designed for the needs of the Strategic Rocket Forces, noted in documentation as DM62.

The locomotives had 1,524 mm (5 ft) gauge bogies with two brake cylinders and single-sided brake shoe application. Additionally, unlike the export models, such locomotives were equipped with certain components standard for Soviet diesel locomotives (for example, the SA-3 automatic coupler, ZHR-3M radio station, braking equipment). Starting with M62-1436 (built in 1974), the locomotives began to be fitted with exhaust noise silencers.

Most locomotives from the USSR MPS series were prepared for the possibility of transfer to other countries. In the certificate, in this case, a note was made stating: "The product specified in this certificate complies with the quality standards, technical specifications, and order requirements in force in the USSR and may be shipped for export".

===== 2M62 =====
2M62-1026

A dual-unit variant of the M62 family, the experimental model of which was built in August 1976. It was produced until the end of 1987. A total of 1,261 locomotives (2,522 units) were built.

In terms of design, each unit was largely identical to the single-unit M62 (the degree of unification of all parts and assemblies reached 92%). Instead of the rear cabs of the M62, a gangway to the adjacent unit was installed on each unit of the 2M62. Both units were identical to each other. Each of them could operate as an independent single-cab locomotive. Both units shared the same overall locomotive serial number (to differentiate for accounting purposes, one of them was designated with the letter A, and the other with the letter B).

As production continued, certain modifications were made to the design (in particular, instead of single round buffer lights, blocks of standardized rectangular buffer lights began to be introduced).

===== DM62 =====
DM62-1759 in Kaduy

An unusual variant in the M62 series, designed for military use, including for hauling trains of the combat railway missile system (BZHRK) "Molodets". When delivering these locomotives, the letter D was not placed on the nameplate. The numbering series was also common with regular M62s for the Ministry of Railways: since the last number of the civilian model was 1723, the first military model received the number 1724; subsequently, the numbering continued up to 1877. The first model and four more locomotives were built in 1982, and thereafter, each year LTZ built several units, up to and including 1993 (a total of 154 locomotives).

For tests at the Shcherbinka proving ground, as well as on the Transcaucasian Railway, a diesel locomotive numbered 1726 was provided. The tests were conducted between 1983 and 1984.

These locomotives had features characteristic of the so-called M62U series (M62UM, 2M62U, and similar): jawless bogies, automatic diesel engine start, adjustable snowplows, main reservoirs with a capacity of 250 L (66 US gal), as well as an increased sand reserve from 600 to 700 kg (1,300 to 1,500 lb). Most DM62 locomotives were equipped with standardized buffer light blocks in rectangular housings. The DM62 was fitted with a 3-14DGU2 diesel generator. The oil system included full-flow fine oil filters (as in the 2M62 variant).

The main distinction of the DM62 is its special equipment, which is due to the specific operating conditions of the BZHRK, as well as a modified electrical circuit. For example, these locomotives were equipped with a system resembling the system of many units (SME). Unlike the standard SME, the DM62 had the ability to remotely control all sections not only following the "locomotive-locomotive" scheme but also the "locomotive-car-locomotive" scheme. To ensure communication between different train units of the BZHRK, the front part of the locomotive was equipped with sectioning, communication, and control panels (PSSU). Each panel was housed inside a protective casing, shaped like a rectangular box, located above the automatic coupler (similar panels were also present on the BZHRK cars). In the locomotive cab (in the workspace compartment), a filter-ventilation unit (FVU) was installed, to which a pipe with gas mask valves was connected. In the body (in the area of the refrigerator shaft), an electric heating boiler and a circulation pump with an electric motor were provided. In the diesel room and vestibules, light-shielding panels were installed to cover the windows. The DM62 equipment was required to meet heightened reliability standards.

During production, certain modifications were made to the DM62 design. For example, in the serial number range from 1729 to 1731, rectangular buffer lamp blocks began to be introduced; from number 1738, instead of a shelf with two pin handrails above the buffer lamps, a footrest and two bracket handrails were installed, and the windshield wipers were moved to the top; from number 1740, the design of the body ventilation louvers was changed; from number 1849, the number of horizontal corrugations on the side changed from nine to four.

===== 3M62U =====
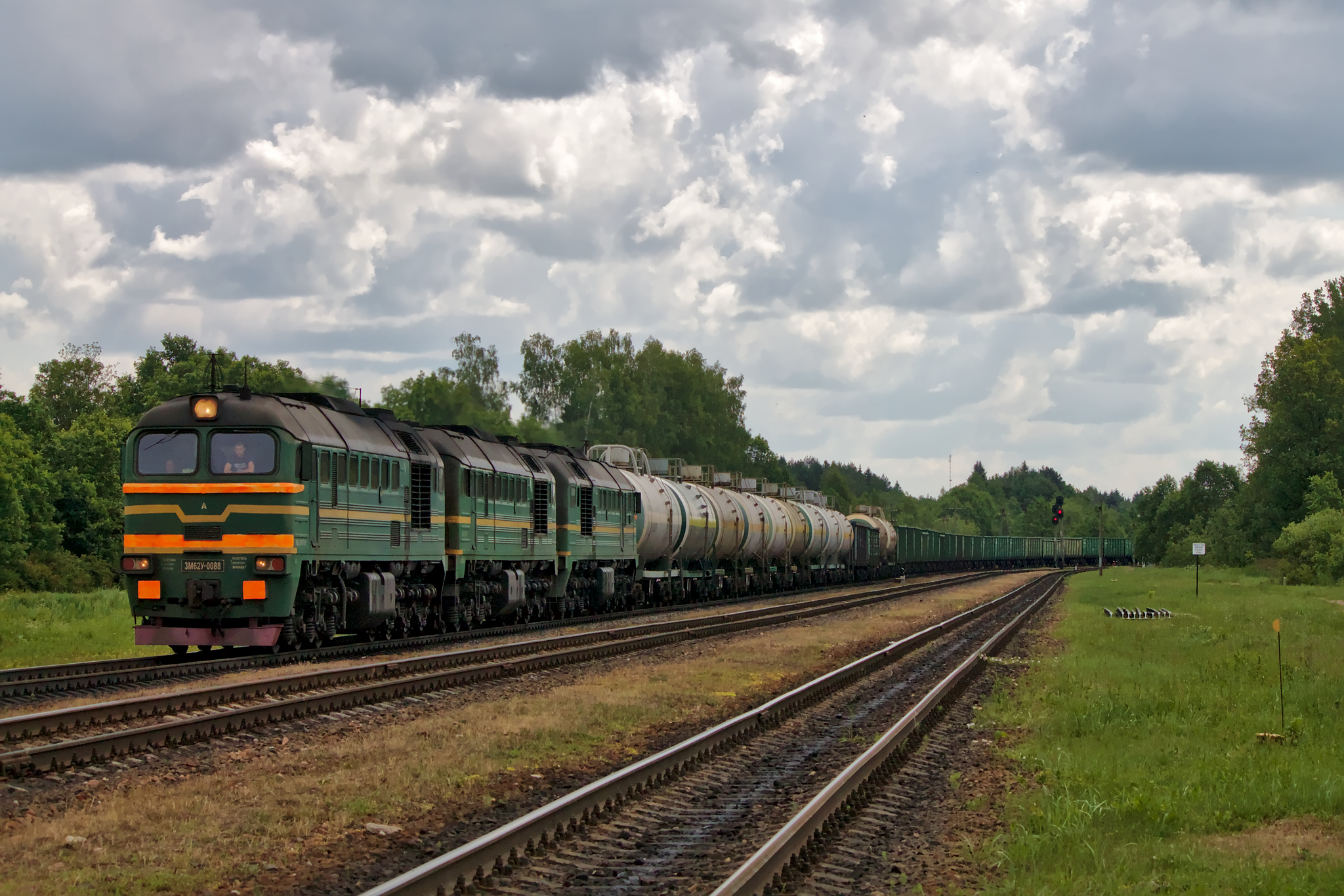
3M62U-0088 near Zaolsha station

The development of the triple-unit variant of the M62U series was initiated as a development of the dual-unit 2M62 in order to obtain a locomotive with high traction capabilities without significantly increasing the axle load. Regarding the M62U series, many solutions from the DM62 were implemented in this design. The prototype (3M62U-0001) was delivered to the Ministry of Railways in 1986 (although it actually appeared in the previous year). In the same year, the serial production begun, continuing through 1992 inclusive. A total of 104 locomotives were built (numbered from 0001 to 0104 inclusive). Each of the three units was designated by its own letter, with the end units, each having a driver's cab, designated by the letters A and B (both units were identical in design), while the middle section, which did not have a cab, was designated by the letter V. At where the driver’s cab is situated in the leading unit (on the side opposite the refrigerator), there is a small control panel in the middle unit. It is intended for performing shunting operations and conducting rheostat tests. However, aside from the absence of a cab, the middle unit lacked components such as the driver’s valve unit No. 395, the brake locking device No. 367, ALSN and radio communication kits, and some others, it could not be used for hauling trains. The control circuits of the leading units were connected through articulated joints and the transit wires of the middle unit.

===== 2M62U =====
2M62Y-0022

The dual-unit variant of the M62U series, which succeeded the 2M62. The first unit (2M62U-0001) was built in 1987, and production continued until 2001 inclusive. It is known that at least 396 locomotives were built for the USSR (numbered from 0001 to 0396), with 2M62U-0394 being obtained exceptionally from the middle unit of 3M62P-0003, followed by a change in designation and number. Similar locomotives were also built for delivery to Iran (approximately 10 locomotives).

===== 3M62P =====
An unusual triple-unit variant, also belonging to the M62U series, was designed for use at the Baikonur Cosmodrome. Externally, it is identical to the 3M62U variant, but it has the necessary options for operation with facilities at the cosmodrome (such as movement at very low speeds and smooth acceleration from a standstill). The locomotive was not produced in series; only three units were built in 1988, with numbers from 0001 to 0003. The last of these locomotives was subsequently converted into 2M62U-0394.

===== M62UP =====
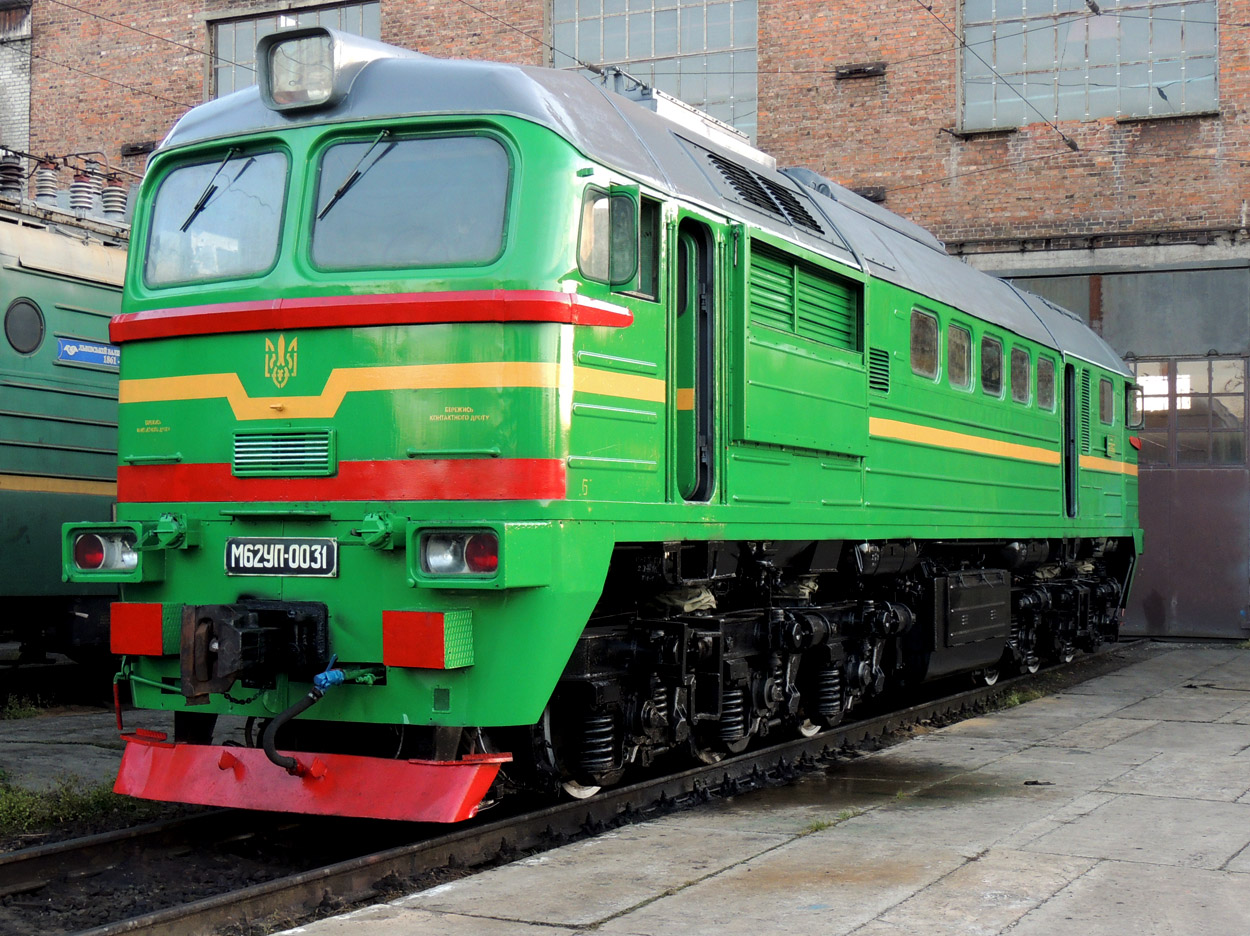
M62UP-0031 at Lviv-West depot

Industrial single-unit variant from the M62U series, equipped with driver cabs on both sides. It was not supplied to the USSR Ministry of Railways, but to a number of enterprises, where it was used for shunting and hauling operations. The first two locomotives (numbers 0001 and 0002) were built in 1988; production then continued from 1991 to 1996. In total, the factory built at least 40 locomotives (numbered from 0001 to 0040).

===== Locomotive production figures =====
| Designation | Build date | Total built | | Fleet numbering | Notes |
| Designation | Build date | Locomotives | Units | Fleet numbering | Notes |
|---|---|---|---|---|---|
| M62 (TE112) | 1970–1976 | 723 | | 1, 2, and from 1003 to 1723 | |
| 2M62 | 1976–1987 | 1261 | 2522 | from 0001 to 1261 | |
| DM62 | 1982–1993 | 154 | | from 1724 to 1877 | |
| 3M62U | 1986–1992 | 104 | 312 | from 0001 to 0104 | The 2M62U-0394 locomotive was obtained by removing the middle unit of the 3M62U-0003 locomotive, followed by redesignating. |
| 2M62U | 1987–2001 | ≈396 | 792 | from 0001 to 0396 | The 2M62U-0394 locomotive was obtained by removing the middle unit of the 3M62U-0003 locomotive, followed by redesignating. |
| 3M62P | 1988 | 3 | 9 | from 0001 to 0003 | |
| M62UP | 1988, 1991–1996 | ≈40 | | from 0001 to 0040 | |

== Technical specifications ==
Main parameters of M62 locomotives (modifications for the USSR Ministry of Railways)
| Parameters | Locomotive model | | | |
| Parameters | M62 (TE112) | 2M62 | 2M62U | 3M62U |
|---|---|---|---|---|
| Number of units | 1 | 2 | 2 | 3 |
| Axial formula | 3_{0}–3_{0} | 2x(3_{0}–3_{0}) | | 3x(3_{0}–3_{0}) |
Dimensions
| Overall size according to GOST 9238–83 | 02-BM (Note: Before the introduction of GOST 9238–83, the size was designated as 02-T.) | | | |
| Length along the coupler axles in milimeters | 17 400 (17 550) | 2x17 400 | | 3x17 400 |
| Body width in milimeters | 2950 | | | |
| Maximum body height from protruding parts in milimeters | 4615 | | | |
| Body frame height in milimeters | 4340 | | | |
| Height of the coupler axles in milimeters | 1055 | | | |
| Kingpin base of the unit in milimeters | 8600 | | | |
| Bogie wheelbase in milimeters | 4200 | | 3700 | |
| Full wheelbase of the unit in milimeters | 12 800 | | 12 670 | |
| Wheel diameter in milimeters | 1050 | | | |
| Minimum curve in meters | 75 | | 125 | |
Weight
| Curb weight in tons (Note: Corresponding to the weight of a fully equipped diesel locomotive.) | 116,5 | 2x120 | 2x126 | 3x126 |
| Axle load in tons | 19,41 | 20 | 21 | |
Traction characteristics
| Diesel power in horsepower (kilowatts) (Note: Given for the value of metric horsepower.) | 2000 (1471) | 2x2000 (2x1471) | | 3x2000 (3x1471) |
| Design speed in kilometers per hour | 100 | | | |
| Long-term mode speed in kilometers per hour | 20 | 20,9 | | |
| Continuous tractive force on wheel rims in tons per force (kilonewtons) | 20 (196) | 2x19,5 (2x191) | 2x20 (2x196) | 3x20 (3x196) |
| Gear ratio of the axial reducer | 4,53 (4,41) (Note: Since 1976, the gear ratio has changed to 4.41.) | 4,41 | | |
Supplies
| Fuel capacity in liters (kilograms) | 3900 (3390) | 2x3900 (2x3390) | 2x7300 (2x6300) | 3x7300 (3x6300) |
| Sand supplies in kilograms | 600 | 2x600 | 2x700 | 3x700 |
| Oil supply in kilograms | 800 | 2x950 | | 3x950 |
| Water supply in kilograms | 950 | 2x950 | | 3x950 |

For single-unit M62 locomotives supplied to MPS, the following parameters are also known: the operating speed is 16.6 km/h (10.3 mph); the tractive force in operating mode is 24.9 tf (244 kN); the maximum tractive force at the wheel rim when accelerating with a coefficient of adhesion of 0.33 is 38.3 tf (376 kN).

== Design ==
=== Mechanical part ===
Each unit of the locomotive has a body supported by two three-axle bogies.

==== Body ====
===== Design features =====
The locomotive body is of a frame construction with a carriage-type layout and a load-bearing frame. Unlike the TE3 and 2TE10L locomotives, the panels of the body above the diesel engine are welded to the frame and adjacent elements, which has increased the strength and rigidity of the structure. The unit body (using a single-unit locomotive as an example) consists of three parts: the front cab block (A) with the body above the electrical equipment compartment, the body above the diesel engine, and the rear cab block (B) with the refrigeration compartment. Each end of the body is equipped with a single track cleaner.

===== Equipment layout =====
In the layout of the M62 diesel locomotive body, there is an engine compartment in the center of the body and two driver cabs at the ends of the body. Between the engine compartment and the front driver cab is the equipment room (on the right) and the front vestibule (on the left). Between the engine compartment and the rear driver cab is the rear vestibule. Access to the locomotive is provided through four side doors: the doors on the front cab side lead to the engine compartment and the front vestibule, while the doors on the rear cab side lead to the rear vestibule. The front vestibule has four doors: the entrance door, doors to the front cab, to the equipment room, and to the engine compartment. The rear vestibule also has four doors: two side entrance doors, a door to the rear cab, and a door to the engine compartment.

To move from unit to unit on the 2M62 locomotive, the rear end of the locomotive has a door with a gangway instead of two front windows. This gangway between units is installed on the side of the refrigerator (in single-unit M62 locomotives, this area housed cab B, the equipment of which is absent in the 2M62). To maintain balance in the weight distribution, cast iron parts were installed in place of the removed equipment. The space of the former cab is effectively been transformed into a rear gangway vestibule.

In the early 2M62 units, a pair of external doors were still installed at the rear of the unit (in the area of the former B cab), along with the rear panel of the cab and the manual brake drive. In the 2M62 locomotive numbered 0070, as well as from 0072, the rear vestibule was made without external doors, and the rear panel of the cab and the manual brake drive were removed in this area. Instead of the removed external doors, folding windows were installed to provide access to the drive for covering the refrigerator louvers. Thus, each unit of these locomotives had only two external doors, while the rear vestibule occupied the entire area of the rear cab.

On 2M62 locomotives numbered from 0250, standardized doors began to be used; nn locomotives numbered from 0540, standardized snowplows were introduced; on locomotives numbered from 0880, the design of the body ventilation louvers was changed. Numbered from 0924, the design of the inter-section gangway was modified (instead of a tubular canvas fence, a metal frame with rubber seals was used). On 2M62-0970 locomotive, as an experiment, fuel tanks with an increased capacity of 7,300 L (1,900 US gal) (or 6,300 kg (13,900 lb)) were installed, later applied to the M62U series.

On the 2M62-0001 locomotive, CME sockets were not installed on the front part of the unit; however, in serial production, the sockets were installed.

On 2M62 locomotives numbered 0733, 0751, and numbered from 0753 onwards, instead of single round headlights, standardized blocks of headlights in a rectangular shape were installed.

On M62U series locomotives, fuel tanks of increased capacity were installed; therefore, the batteries, previously located in the side compartments of the tank, were moved to the non-operating cab of the unit. The capacity of the sandboxes increased. The design of the high-voltage chamber became removable. The drive for covering the refrigerator louver was moved inside the body. One window of the engine compartment on each side of the unit was made operable. Instead of a washbasin, bathrooms were installed.

===== Driver's cab =====
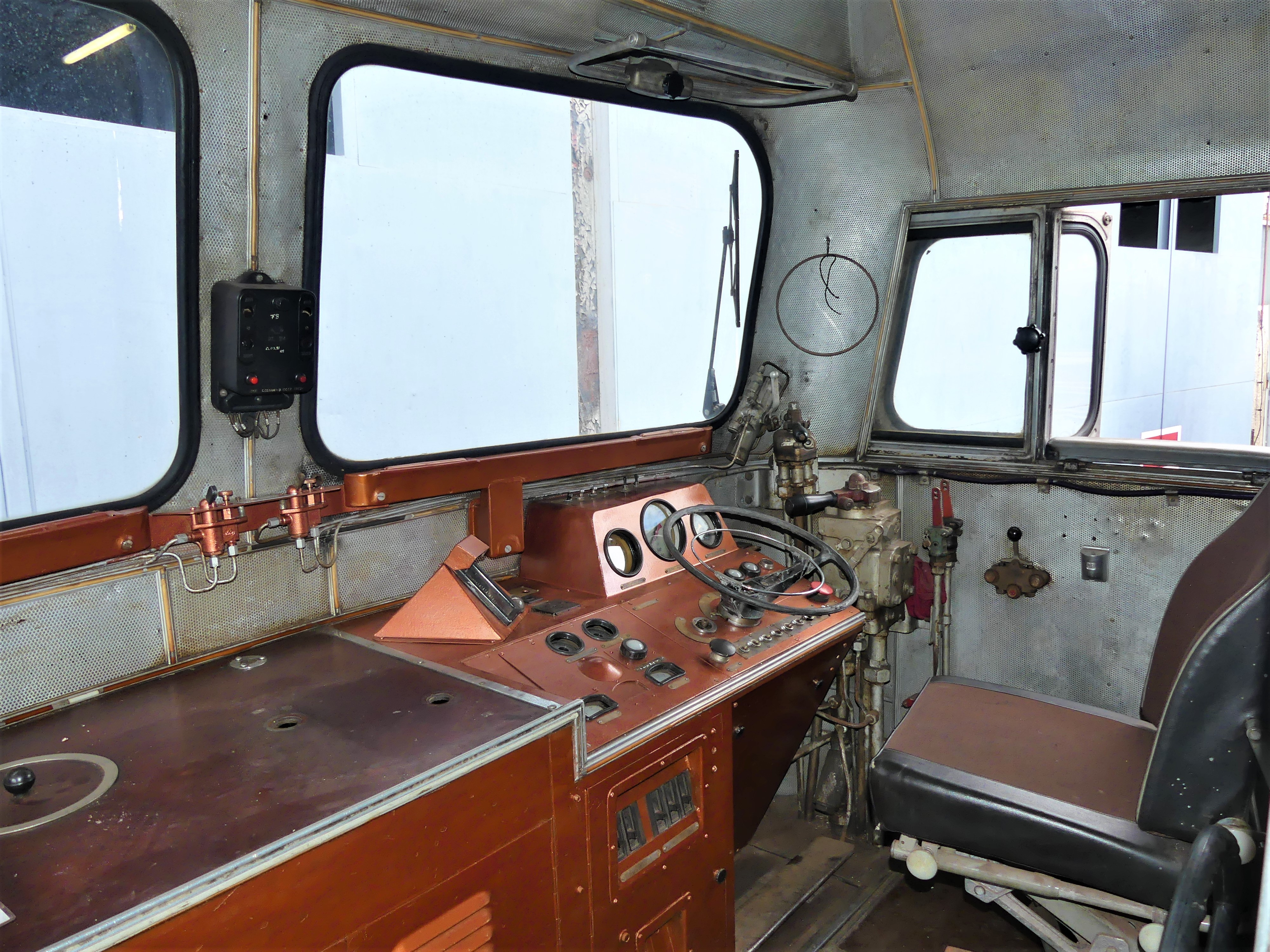
Driver's cab of the M62 locomotive of 120 series of East German Railways

Driver's cab of the 3M62U locomotive. Above the controller, six dial gauges are noticeably present instead of three.

The cab of the M62 locomotive has an entrance door in the rear wall leading to the vestibule, two front windows, and two side windows. The side windows have sliding vents that move forward in the direction of travel. The vents have windshields that can be turned perpendicular to the direction of travel, which reduces drafts.

At the front of the cab, beneath the windshield windows, there is a control panel. To the right in front of it is the driver's seat, and to the left is the assistant driver's seat. Almost all controls and measuring instruments are located on the control panel on the driver's side.

At the top of the control panel, to the left of the driver, there is a locomotive speedometer (when modernizing a diesel locomotive with the installation of the KLUB-U safety system, the BIL-V unit of this system is located in place of the speedometer). To the right of the speedometer are: the "Fire-1/2" toggle switch, four toggles for turning on the buffer lamps (front and rear), and three indicator lamps: "Grounding relay", "Brake line break", "Fire". Further to the right, on the vertical panel of the control panel, there are three pneumatic system pressure gauges: the brake cylinder pressure gauge, the double-pointer pressure gauge for the feed and brake lines, and the equalizing reservoir pressure gauge. Above these instruments are toggle switches: "ALS-N: with filter/without filter", "Green light", "Instrument lighting", "ALS-N. White light", "Upper blinds", "Cab lighting".

The central part of the control panel in front of the driver consists of an inclined panel. On the left side of it are measuring instruments arranged in three rows. In the top row are the instruments: electric thermometer "Water of 2nd section", electric thermometer "Diesel oil", electric thermometer "Diesel water". In the middle row are the electro-manometers "Oil of 2nd unit: and "Oil of 1st unit". In the bottom row are the ammeter "Battery charge", the voltmeter "Generator voltage", and the ammeter "Generator load". Almost in the center of the panel is the main handle of the driver's controller, designed in the form of a steering wheel; to its left is the socket for a removable reversing handle. Below the steering wheel are the “Control Point” button and a series of toggle switches: “Automatic Control”, “Oil Shutters”, “Water Shutters”, “Refrigerator Fan”, “Dim Headlight”, “Bright Headlight”, and “Front/Rear Headlight”. To the right of the driver's controller steering wheel are four indicator lamps: “Diesel of 2nd Unit”, “Load Release of 1st Unit”, “Load Release of 2nd Unit”, and “Alertness”. Further to the right of the lamps, from top to bottom, are three buttons: “Start Diesel 1”, “Start Diesel 2”, and “Alertness”.

The earliest 2M62 units were equipped with KV-1508 driver controllers. Since 1977, they were replaced with KV-1552 controllers, whose driver's controller was shaped as an open circle. Later, a "Maneuvers" (KMP) button appeared on the right sidewall of the cab next to the driver, allowing the traction circuit of the first position to be assembled without moving the driver's controller.

==== Bogies ====
DM62 locomotive bogies

The bogies of the locomotive of the basic modification are made according to the type of bogies of the TE3 series locomotives. The axle boxes are jaw-type with cylindrical roller bearings; the wheel diameter is 1,050 mm (3 ft 5 in); gear ratio of the traction reducer is 68 : 15 = 4.53. Unlike the TE3 and 2TE10L locomotives, the bogies of the M62 locomotive are equipped with combined sliding and rolling supports; additionally, the design of these bogies includes certain features that allow them to be manufactured for different track gauges. The bogies of locomotives supplied for export differed in the number of brake cylinders (four units) and in having double-sided brake shoe application.

Traction and braking forces from the bogies to the car body is transmitted through the central kingpins. The static deflection of the spring suspension is 77 mm (3.0 in). The bogies have jaw-type axle boxes with cylindrical roller bearings. Spring stops for the axle ends of the wheel sets are designed to absorb axial forces. The bogie gearbox is one-way; the gear module is 10. Until 1976, the gearbox ratio was 15:68=1:4.53; afterwards, a gearbox with a ratio of 17:75=1:4.412 was installed.

The ST44-1500 locomotive was fitted with jawless bogies. Similar bogies were installed on DM62 locomotives, as well as on locomotives of the M62U series. These bogies featured a one-sided arrangement of traction motors and double-sided brake shoe application.

=== Engine compartment ===
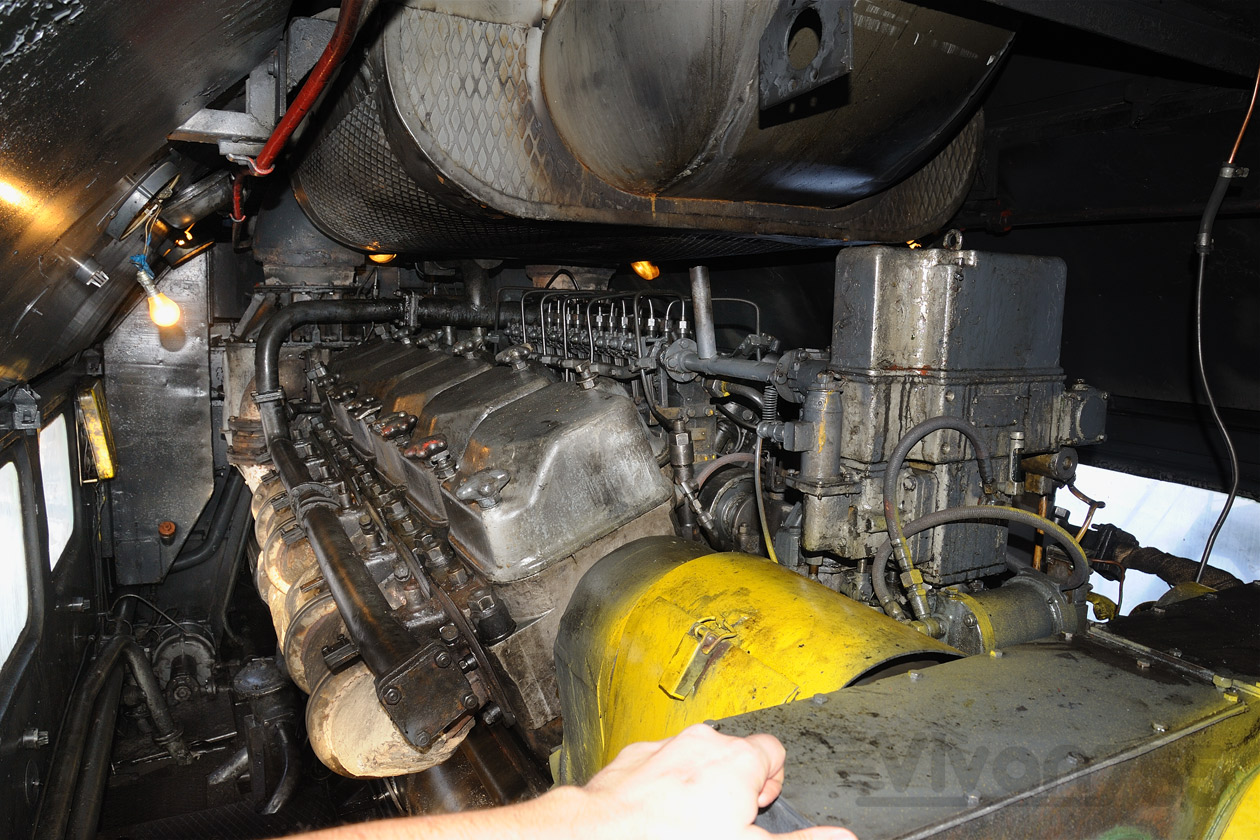
Engine compartment of the M62 locomotive with 14D40 diesel engine

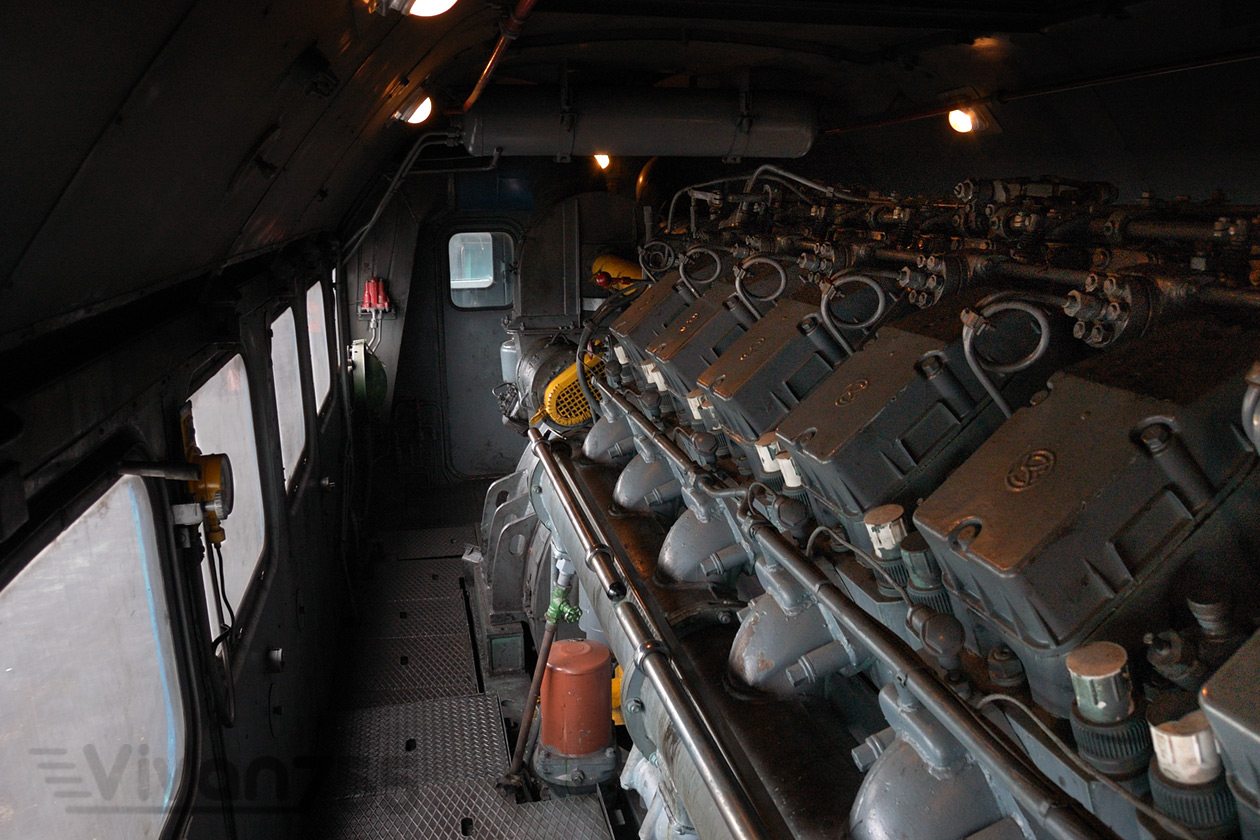
Engine compartment of the M62 locomotive with 2D49 diesel engine

The engine compartment of the M62 locomotive includes a 14DG type diesel-generator unit, consisting of a 14D40 type diesel engine and a GP-312 traction generator, mounted on a common frame.

In the engine compartment of the M62, a 14D40 (12DN23/30) diesel engine produced by the Kolomna Locomotive Works is installed. The power for this model is comparable to the 2D100 diesel engine used in the TE3 locomotives, but the 14D40 has a lower weight and offers an advantage in compactness. It is a two-stroke, 12-cylinder, V-type (cylinder bank angle 45°) diesel engine with water cooling, valve-ported scavenging, a driven supercharger, and turbocharging.

The air supply system to the engine cylinders includes two stages. The first stage is formed by two turbochargers driven by exhaust gases. In the second stage, a supercharger driven by the diesel crankshaft is used.

In the cooling system (of the open type) of the diesel engine, there are two water circulation circuits, one of which is intended for cooling the engine itself, and the second — for cooling the oil in the heat exchanger. An axial fan is installed in the cooling chamber, connected to the diesel engine shaft through a gearbox and a hydraulic coupling.

Main specifications of Kolomna 14D40 diesel engine:

- nominal power (at a rotational speed of 750 rpm) — 2000 hp;
- cylinder displacement — 150.6 L (39.8 US gal);
- cylinder diameter — 230 mm (9.1 in);
- piston stroke — 304.3 mm (11.98 in);
- mass of dry diesel — 10 t (22,000 lb);
- mass of the diesel engine with the sub-diesel frame and the coupling — 12.5 t (28,000 lb).

The 2M62 locomotives are equipped with a 14DGU2 type diesel-generator unit, which included a 14D40U2 type diesel engine (12DN23/30) and a GP-312U2 traction generator. Compared to the single-unit variant, a modified emergency fuel supply system for the diesel engine was implemented here (a tank was installed instead of the emergency supply valve). In addition, full-flow fine oil filters were installed on the 2M62 (except for locomotives numbered from 0002 to 0008 inclusive). Since 1982, in this variant, pneumatic instruments and relay sensors have been used instead of thermostats with ceresin elements and micro-switches.

On the M62U series locomotives, non-duralumin connections are installed in the oil pipeline to the centrifuge and in the water pipeline for cooling the exhaust pipes. A compact exhaust noise silencer is also used.

==== Oil system ====
The oil system provides lubrication for the sliding parts of the diesel engine and their cooling, operates the hydraulic drive of the cooling chamber fan, and lubricates a number of auxiliary mechanisms. To ensure the circulation of oil in the oil system, an oil gear pump with external engagement is installed. It operates continuously when the diesel engine is running. The oil pump is driven by the diesel engine's crankshaft through a gearbox and is mounted on the side of the diesel engine opposite the generator.

The oil pump draws oil from the diesel crankcase, where the main volume of oil is located. At the same time, the oil is delivered through the oil pump via a pipeline to the water-oil heat exchanger. In the heat exchanger, the oil, heated in the diesel, is cooled. From the heat exchanger, the cooled oil passes through a coarse oil filter back into the diesel, into its oil collector. After lubricating the diesel's rubbing parts, the oil drains into the diesel crankcase. Part of the oil from the oil pump passes through a relief valve to the centrifugal fine oil filter. From there, the purified oil bypasses the heat exchanger and the diesel and goes directly into the diesel crankcase. When the oil pressure is below 2.5 atmospheres, the relief valve does not allow oil to flow to the fine oil filter.

To protect the diesel engine's oil system from excessive oil pressure, a safety valve is installed after the oil pump. When the oil pressure exceeds 10 atm, the valve opens, allowing oil from the pump to flow directly into the diesel engine's crankcase, which reduces the oil pressure. To maintain the oil pressure in the diesel engine at no more than 6.2 atm after the coarse filter, a bypass valve is installed. When the oil pressure before the diesel exceeds 6.2 atm, this valve opens, allowing part of the oil to bypass the engine and flow into its crankcase.

The oil pump operates simultaneously with the diesel engine. Therefore, after a prolonged shutdown of the diesel engine, semi-dry friction occurs in the diesel engine bearings due to a lack of oil. To prevent this friction, prior to cranking the diesel crankshaft, the diesel engine is primed with oil using a separate gear-type oil priming pump powered by an electric motor. This pump draws oil from the diesel engine sump and then, through a check valve, delivers oil to the diesel engine oil collector. At the moment the crankshaft begins to rotate, the oil priming pump is turned off, and oil circulation is maintained by the main oil pump.

A portion of the cooled oil after coarse filtration is supplied to auxiliary mechanisms:

- through a reduction valve, which lowers the oil pressure to 0.3–0.7 atm, for lubricating the rear distribution reducer and the hydraulic drive reducer
- through the safety valve — to the servo motor of the cooling fan hydraulic clutch
- Through the same safety valve and thermostat — into the cooling fan coupling. The safety valve allows oil to flow to the fan hydraulic drives if the oil pressure exceeds 0.7 atm.

After passing through these mechanisms, the oil also returns to the diesel crankcase, from where it is supplied through the main oil pump to the water-oil heat exchanger. If necessary, these mechanisms can be disconnected from the main oil system using valves.

The measurement of oil pressure before and after the coarse filter, the oil pressure of the rear distribution gearbox and the hydraulic drive gearbox, and the oil pressure in the fan hydraulic coupling is carried out using four manometers installed in the engine compartment. To inform the operator about the oil pressure and temperature at the diesel inlet, two pressure sensors and two oil temperature sensors are installed on the diesel oil collector. Electrical signals from the sensors are transmitted to the electromechanical pressure gauges and electric thermometers installed in the operator cabins.

Oil pressure control from the locomotive control system is carried out using an oil pressure relay, which monitors the oil pressure in the diesel engine's oil collector. When the oil pressure drops, it ensures the unloading of the diesel engine or its shutdown. Oil temperature control from the locomotive control system is carried out using an oil thermal relay, which monitors the temperature of the cooled oil at the outlet of the heat exchanger. If this temperature exceeds 70–75 degrees Celsius, the oil thermal relay will unload the generator, and consequently, the diesel engine.

=== Electrical equipment ===
The M62 locomotive transmission is direct current electric, featuring one traction generator and six traction motors (TEDs). The locomotive's electrical machines (traction generator, TEDs, exciter, auxiliary generator, synchronous booster) are manufactured by the Kharkiv plant "Electrotyazhmash".

The traction electric motor type ED-107 was borrowed from the design of the TE3 locomotive (as were auxiliary electric machines, battery units, and a number of other components). The cascade control circuit of the traction generator excitation with a magnetic amplifier is similar to that used on 2TE10L locomotives numbered from 003 onwards. Later, the locomotive began to be equipped with a slightly modified traction motor type ED-107A. In operation on the M62, these traction motors had a rated power of 193 kW (voltage 355 V at a current of 595 A). The maximum voltage was 570 V at a current of 372 A. The mass of a single traction motor is 3,100 kg (6,800 lb). The electrical circuit provides for two stages of weakened excitation of the traction motor (60% and 37%). In 1974, the plant began installing traction motors of type ED-118A on the M62 with similar parameters.

The traction generator GP-312 is a ten-pole, direct current generator with independent excitation and forced ventilation. In design, it is similar to the traction generator GP-307 of the TE3L locomotive. The generator's nominal power is 1270 kW (at a voltage of 356 V and a current of 3570 A); the maximum voltage is 570 V (at a current of 2230 A); the nominal rotational speed is 750 rpm; and the weight is 7,400 kg (16,300 lb).

A separate DC generator — an exciter of type V-600 — is used to excite the main generator. The exciter and the auxiliary generator type VGT-275/120 are combined into a single two-machine unit A-706A. It differs from the A-706B unit of 2TE10L locomotives in that the free end of its shaft is located on the exciter side, not the auxiliary generator side. The exciter has a power of 20.6 kW; voltage 165 V; current 125 A. The nominal rotational speed of the armatures of the exciter and the auxiliary generator is 1800 rpm. The auxiliary generator has a power of 12 kW (voltage 75 V at a current of 160 A). The mass of the two-machine unit is 660 kg (1,460 lb).

The electric transmission of the diesel locomotive also includes: a single-phase AC synchronous generator — a synchronous exciter of the GS-500 type and a tachogenerator of the TG-83/35 type. These two machines are also combined into a single two-machine unit (in this case, A-705A), driven by the diesel engine. The exciter’s power is 1.1 kW (voltage 110 V; current 10 A); current frequency 133 Hz (at an armature rotation speed of 4000 rpm). The tachogenerator power is 0.12 kW. Before the M62 locomotives, a two-machine unit of the A-705A type was installed on 2TE10L locomotives. Since 1971, instead of the GS-500 type exciter, synchronous exciters of the VS-652 type with a rated power of 550 kW (voltage 110 V; current 10 A; power factor 0.5) and similar current frequency parameters have been installed. The weight of the VS-652 is 68 kg (150 lb).

The low-voltage circuits of the locomotive are powered by direct current at 75 V from an auxiliary generator of the VGT-275/120 type (part of the two-machine unit A-706A). Automatic maintenance of the 75 V voltage on the generator is provided by a TRN1-type voltage regulator. When the diesel engine is stopped or the auxiliary generator is faulty, the low-voltage circuits are powered by a 32TN-450 type lead-acid battery, the same battery used for engine startups. The battery has a capacity of 450 Ah and a nominal voltage of 64 V.

The electrical circuit of the 2M62 locomotive has some differences from the M62 locomotive. For example, a parallel connection of the batteries of both locomotive units is provided during the engine startup of either unit (D3 contactors are used), new electrical devices have been applied (including the contactless voltage regulator BRN-3V instead of TRN-1), and so on. Since 1979, compact TRPU-1 type relays have been installed on this locomotive (instead of the bulky R-45M control relays).

A number of improvements were implemented on the M62U series. For example, the capability for continuous operation in three units appeared (implemented in the 3M62U); automatic diesel start was introduced (with the installation of the RV2 time relay and the RU6 relay); an autonomous idle mode for the diesel of any unit was introduced (with the installation of the RU12 and RU13 relays); in the traction mode circuit, an additional intermediate protection relay RU2 was installed, which, together with the RV3 time relay and the low-current contacts of most protection relays, is allocated in a separate electrical circuit. New protection devices appeared, the numbering of many wires was changed, and so on. Standardized intersection connections (also called joksy) were applied.

=== Brake equipment ===
The M62 was equipped with two braking systems: manual and pneumatic. The manual system engaged only two axles, whereas the pneumatic system acted on all six axles simultaneously. Each bogie was fitted with four brake cylinders, 10 in (250 mm) in diameter. To control the pneumatic system, the driver's valve type No. 222 was initially installed, followed by type No. 394. Air distributors type No. 270-002 were used.

On the 2M62 locomotive, a brake line break indicator (pneumo-electric sensor type no. 418) is added to the brake system. Since 1977, a synchronization device has been integrated into its system, intended for the synchronous control of braking mechanisms in coupled trains. In 1985, an improvement was added that allowed the locomotive's braking to be activated in the event of automatic uncoupling of the units (or a breach in the integrity of the inter-sectional hoses). For this purpose, interlocking and switching valves were implemented. Additionally, each unit began to be equipped with a brake lock device (type no. 367), a pressure relay (repeater type no. 304), and a supply reservoir.

The M62U series was equipped with standardized main tanks with a capacity of 250 litres (66 US gal) (instead of 222 litres (59 US gal)), and each unit was fitted with two pressure relays (condition No. 404).

== Modernizations ==
Modernized M62K-1612 locomotive of Lithuania

The M62 locomotives, which have exhausted the operational life of their diesel-generator units, are being modernized. In most cases, the two-stroke 14D40 (12DN23/30) diesel engine is replaced with a four-stroke 2D49 (12CHN26/26) engine with an output of 2,000 hp (as part of a 5-26DG type diesel-generator unit).

The D49 locomotives are easily recognizable by the air filter, protruding as a "transverse hump" on the roof, and another exhaust pipe. Sometimes they were assigned a new class: M62K (in Lithuania and recently in Belarus), 2M62K (Russia and Belarus, Lithuania), 2M62UK (Russia and Belarus), 2M62UR (Latvia).

In Hungary and Lithuania, some locomotives received Caterpillar diesel engines during overhaul (KR) and modernization, which are more powerful than the previously installed 14D40 engines. Such locomotives have been assigned a new class 2M62US or 2M62M (Lithuania; not to be confused with 2M62M for Mongolia).

In North Korea, some M62 locomotives were converted into electric locomotives. Additionally, in Azerbaijan, 2M62-0158 was converted into an electric locomotive using electrical equipment from the VL8M. In 2017, in Poland, Rail Polska (commissioned by VIS systems) modernized 2M62U-1006 locomotive into an electric locomotive designated 207E-001.

== M62 locomotive with MAZ-547V chassis ==
In summer 2002, the Russian Ministry of Defense ordered Kolomna Locomotive Works to build an ultra heavy-duty, multi-axle off-road vehicle. Its alleged purpose was to study the possibility of using individual electric drives for all driven and steered wheels on heavy multi-axle chassis, the resulting machine may have also been intended to serve as a mobile power station. Kolomna began constructing a machine from two different vehicles sharing the same purpose as a 12x12 MAZ-7904 missile truck. It was carried out by specialists from the 21st Research Institute in collaboration with the Bauman Moscow State Technical University.

The machine was based on a Soviet 12x12 MAZ-547V missile truck with its engine and transmissions removed. Lowered over top of it, was the body of a DM62-1727 locomotive. Each traction motor was mounted on each wheel, all 12 of which could be steered independently. The steering system or power distribution itself used a complex hydraulic circuit. The machine in was assembled by the Kolomna Scientific Research Institute of Rolling Stock in 2003.

On its very first departure from the Kolomna plant, the third axle of the machine collapsed under the body, and the fourth bogie fell off entirely. (Note: Other sources say it gushed hydraulic fluid from the leaks.) The machine was painted in the original colors, placed on supports, and remained at the Rolling Stock Research Institute until 2004. The machine was transported to Experimental Plant No. 38, where it spent its final years. On 1 December 2011, the Experimental Plant of the Ministry of Defense defunct.

== Push-pull trains with M62 locomotives ==
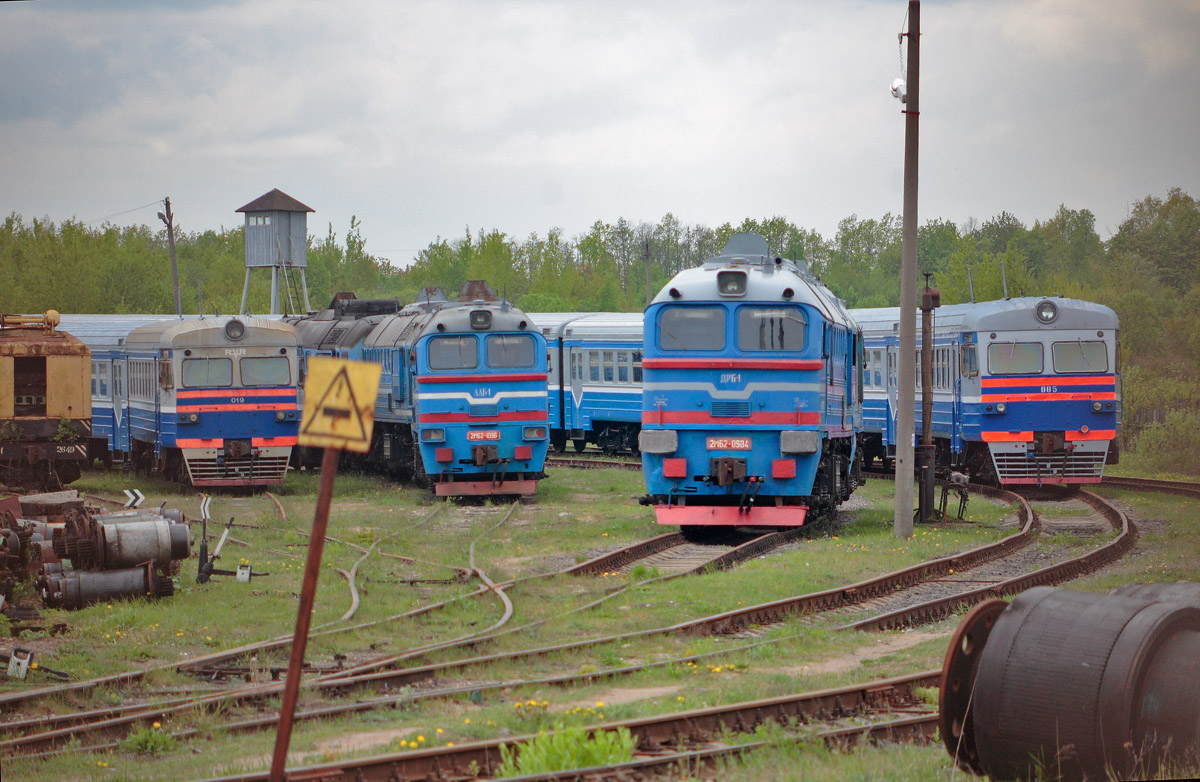
2M62 locomotives with DDB1 and DRB1 multiple units

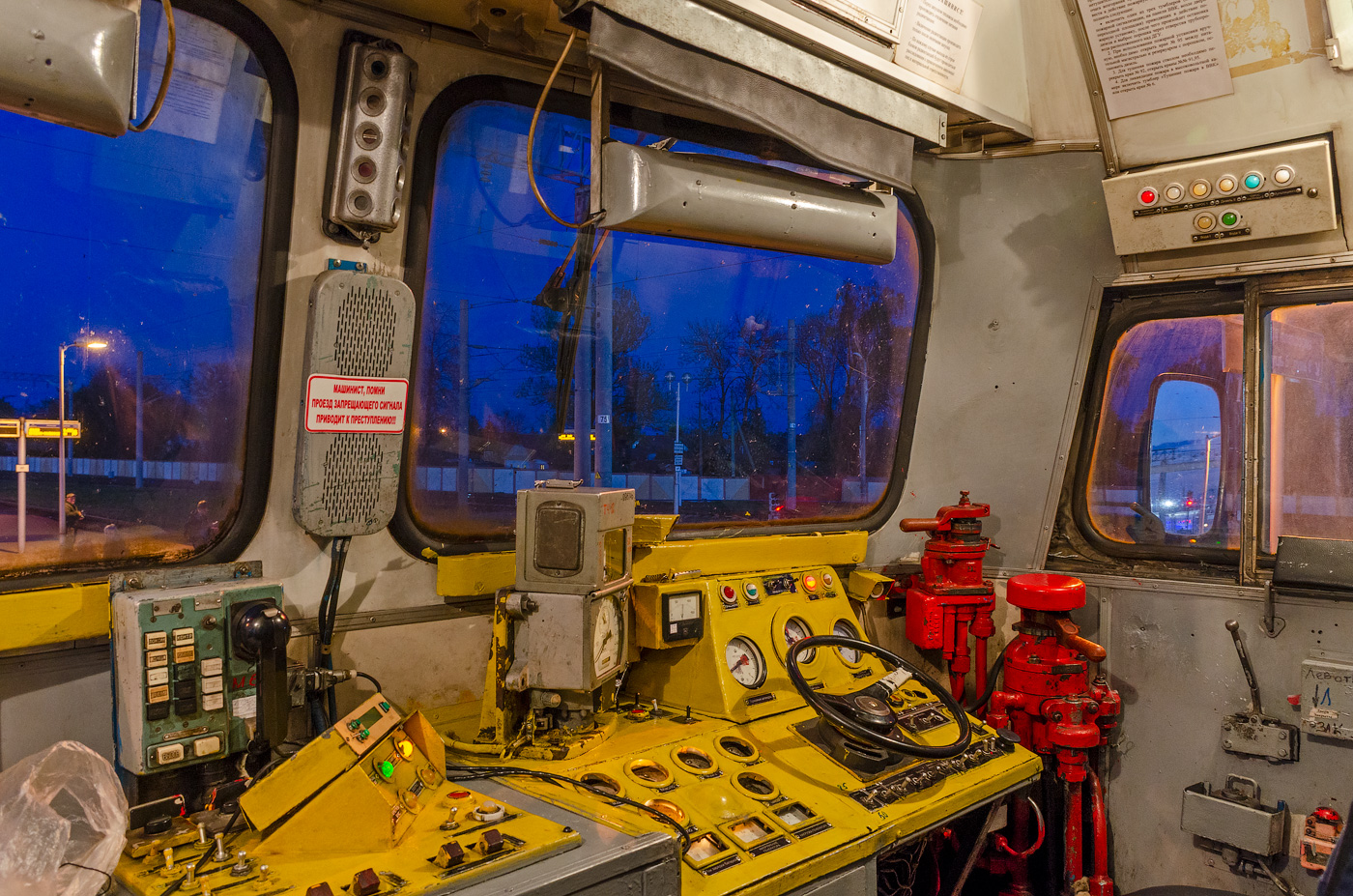
The cab of the 2M62U locomotive with the lights turned on. To the left in front of the radio station, an additional control panel for the doors and power supply of cars for push-pull type trains is visible.

In the 1990s, the formation of suburban push-pull trains using DM62, 2M62, and 2M62U diesel locomotive units and standard MVPS carriages began in Belarus, Ukraine, and Russia. This was facilitated by the availability of unused locomotives of this series due to the decline in freight traffic between the countries of the former USSR and the economic difficulty of supplying new diesel multiple units and their components from Riga, which had become a foreign country, due to a shortage of foreign currency and the absence of domestic diesel multiple unit production. Such multiple units, widely used in Western and Central European countries as well as in North America, had never been employed in the USSR before, and due to the lack of clear terminology, they came to be classified as locomotive-hauled diesel multiple units, although in fact they were not, since they did not include motorized cars standardized with the multiple unit, including locomotive-type ones (for example, British Intercity 125 HST), and an ordinary retrofitted diesel locomotive suitable for operating with regular trains was used as the traction unit.

For operation as part of such a multiple unit, the 2M62 locomotive units underwent modernization, during which they were equipped with an electro-pneumatic brake, a passenger car power supply system for heating and lighting, additional control circuits and instrument panels in the driver's cab for operating automatic doors and electrical equipment in the cars, as well as a "passenger-driver" communication system. The height of the automatic couplers on the rear side of diesel locomotive units was also increased, since the height of the couplers between the cars of Russian motorized rolling stock (MVS) is 100 mm (3.9 in) higher than that of locomotives, conventional locomotive-hauled cars, and the head units of MVS, while single DM62 diesel locomotives had a vestibule and inter-unit gangway installed instead of a rear cab, similar to the 2M62. At the same time, locomotives typically underwent a re-motoring, replacing the two-stroke 14D40 diesel engine with a four-stroke 2D49. This modernization was usually carried out at the same factories where trailer cars were manufactured or modernized.

For the formation of trains, both carriages from decommissioned electric and diesel multiple units of mass series (ER2, ED4 series electric multiple units and DR1 series multiple units) were used, as well as newly built ones. Initially, trains were formed using two locomotive units, with intermediate carriages coupled between them; however, due to the excessive power of the two units for a short train, most of them were split and supplemented with front control cars.

=== DR1pT, DRB1 and DRB1m ===
In 1993, the management of the Belarusian Railway (BCh) became the first among the post-Soviet countries to decide to use idle ual-unit diesel locomotives 2M62 and 2M62U to form "push-pull" type trains together with the trailer cars of disbanded DR1 multiple units, whose motor cars had been decommissioned, as ordering new multiple units in Riga was too expensive. The locomotives underwent modernization at the Riga Carriage-Building Plant, where DR1 carriages were produced.

Initially, trains were formed from two units of a diesel locomotive and intermediate cars, and the first such train was put into service in 1994. However, since the power of a dual-unit locomotive was excessive, instead of using one of them, it was decided to use DR1 attached head cars, converting them from DR1 motor cars by transforming the engine compartment into a passenger cab with the installation of large windows and trimming the protruding part of the roof. Ten cars underwent such conversion, and after modernization, they received the factory designation 63-1366. The multiple units were designated as DR1pT (where "p" indicated the attached nature of the train set, and "T" denoted diesel traction).

Almost immediately after the successful testing of the first trainset in 1994, in order to form such trains, new intermediate and head cars began to be built at RVZ alongside the modernization of locomotives, similar to those used in the three-car DR1A diesel multiple units. From 1994 to 1996, RVZ, on order from BCh, built 70 cars, including 68 intermediate and 2 head cars, and from 2002 to 2006, another 22 cars were built, including 11 intermediate and 11 head cars. Subsequently, two originally intermediate cars were converted into head cars by cutting off and relocating the passenger vestibule and installing a driver's cab. In total, 15 head and 77 intermediate cars were built. These train sets were designated as DRB1 (B – Belarusian Railway) and DRB1m (m – modernized) and received new two-digit numbering. All 15 new head cars received an angular driver's cab, similar to the DR1A diesel multiple units numbered from 318.

A total of 25 multiple units were assembled, of which 10 with modernized DR1 leading cars initially received the designation DR1pT, and 15 with newly built ones were designated DRB1 and DRB1m. 2M62 locomotives numbered 1159, 1227, 1228 and temporarily 1238, and 2M62U numbered 0258, 0259, 0260, 0263, 0264, 0307, 0309 (only unit A), 0311, 0312, 0315, and 0316 were used to assemble the trains; previously, a 2M62-1021, which had been returned to freight service and is now decommissioned, was also used. Each train initially consisted of five or, less commonly, six cars, including the leading car, while the train with car 92 was formed from only two cars. DRB1 and DRB1m multiple units received their own numbering after assembly, whereas DR1pT retained the original numbers, with the main part of their cars being taken from DR1 multiple units with the corresponding numbers. During service, the trainsets were periodically reconfigured and, in some cases, their numbers and designations were changed; in particular, some DR1pT trainsets were redesignated as DRB1 and DRB1m with the assignment of new numbers. Initially, the multiple units were operated at the Polotsk depot, but in 2005 most of them were transferred to the Mogilev depot for operation, and a few more to the Orsha depot. Primarily, the multiple units at the Mogilev depot were serviced by 2M62U locomotives, while those from Orsha were serviced by 2M62 locomotives. As of 2026, 16 and 5 trainsets are operated at these depots, and 4 additional trainsets have been decommissioned.

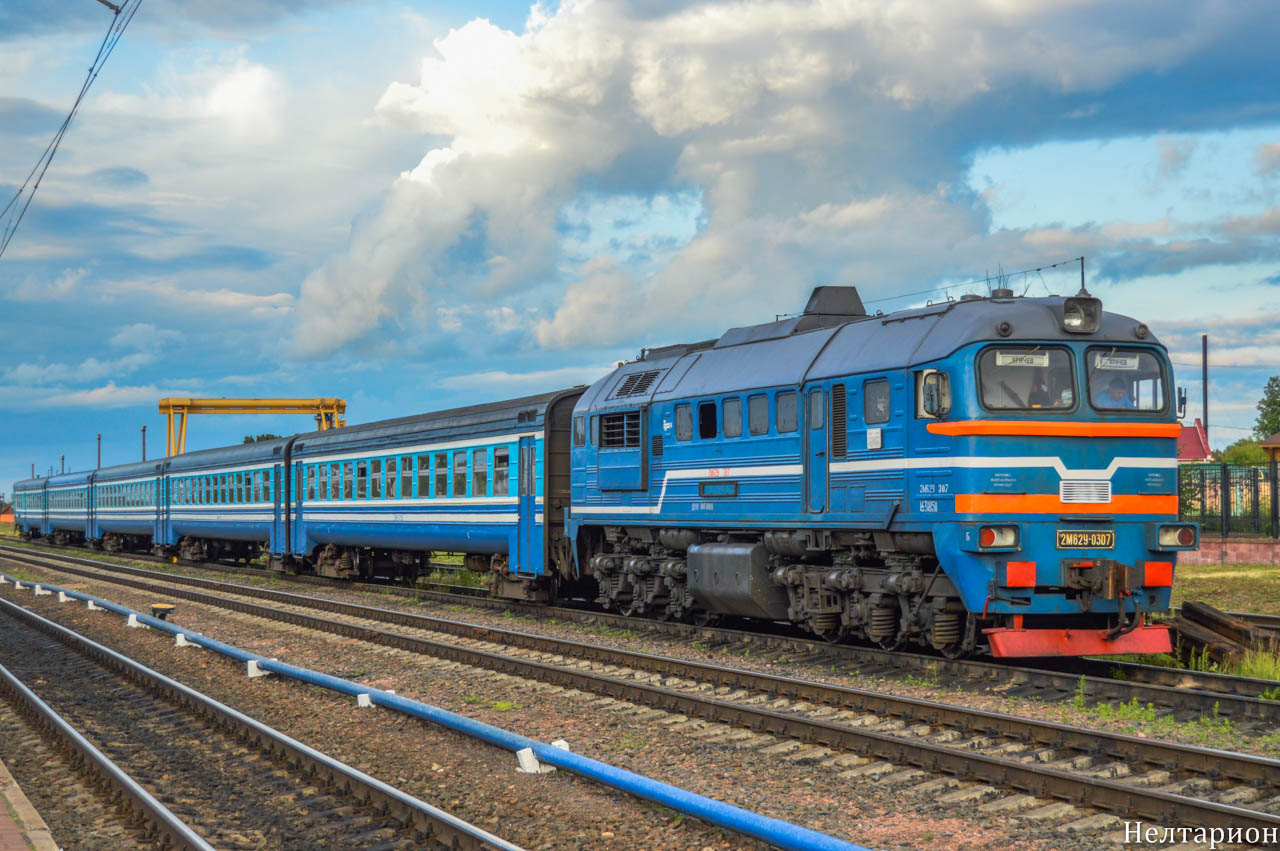
2M62U-0307 unit as part of the DRB1 multiple unit

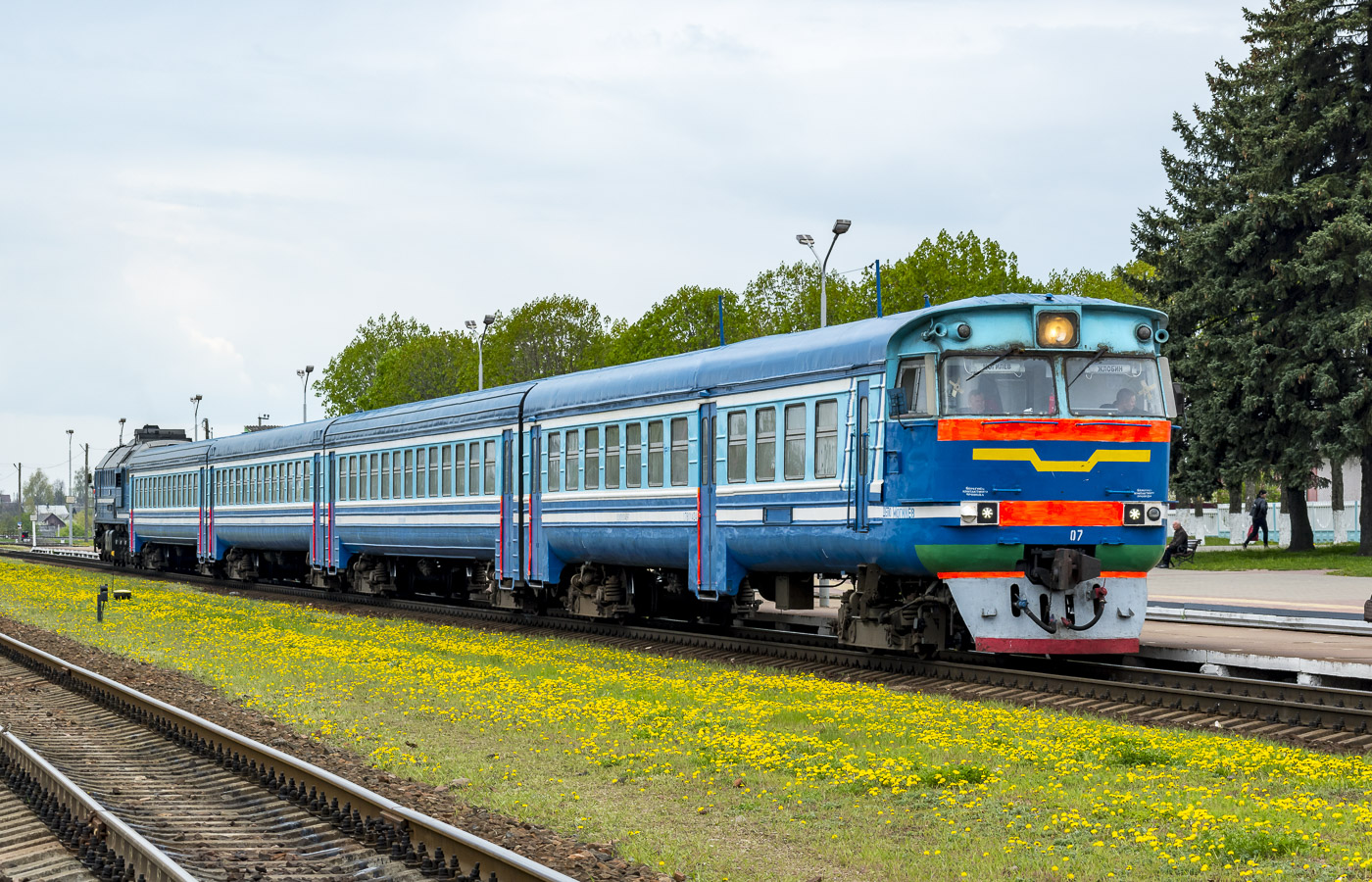
DRB1m-07 multiple unit, modernized from DR1, from the leading car view

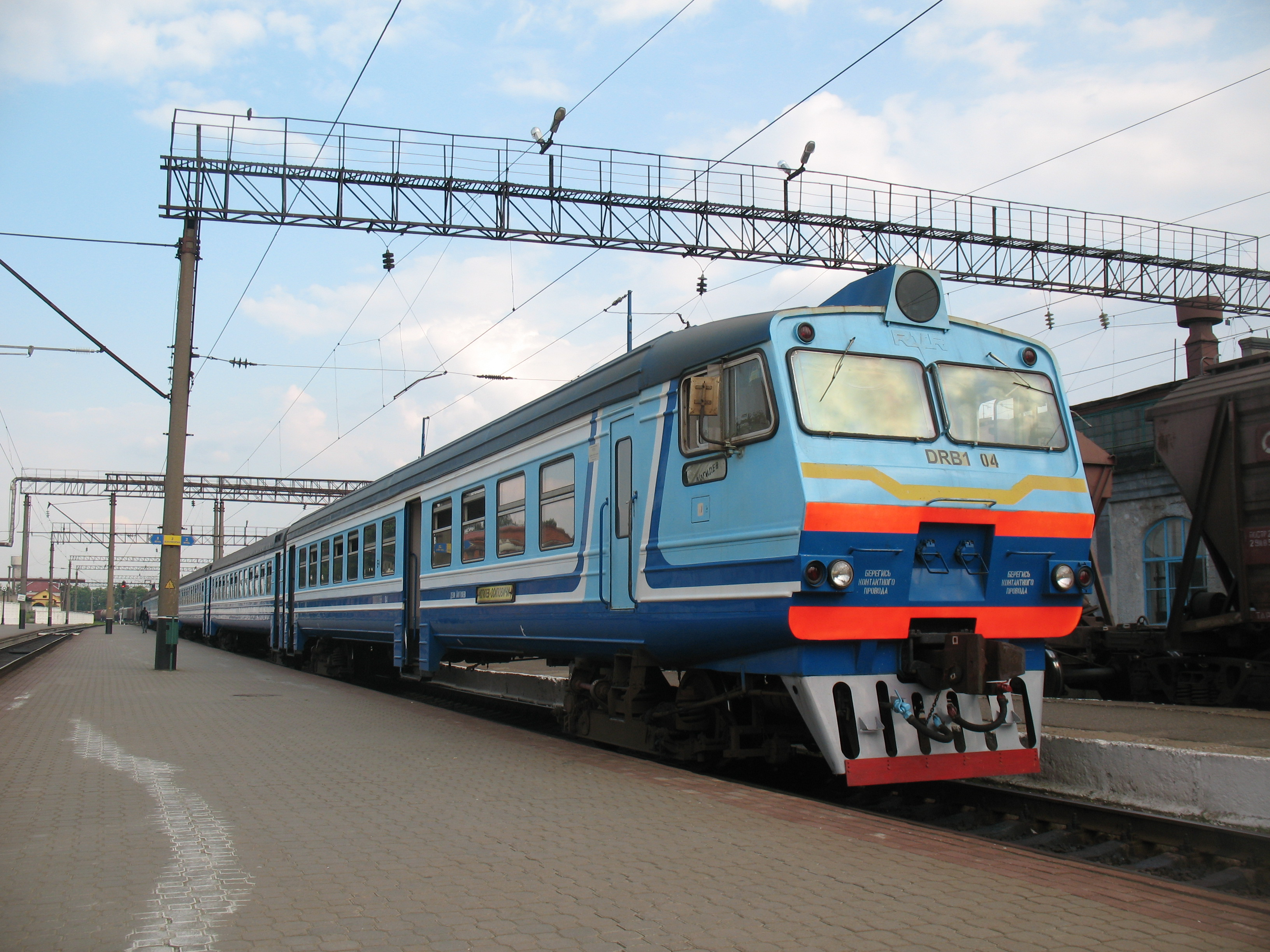
DRB1-04 multiple unit from the side of the new leading car

=== DDB1 and DPSaAZ ===
In 1998 and 1999, the Demikhovo Machine-Building Plant, at the request of the Belarusian Railway and taking into account the successful experience of operating DRB1 trainsets, built ten ten-car diesel multiple units from 63-322 model cars, standardized in the design of the mechanical parts with trailer cars of ED2T/ED4 electric multiple units, and modernized ten 2M62U locomotives for them. The multiple units were designated DDB1 (Demikhovo Diesel Train of the Belarusian Railway, Type 1). These multiple units were delivered to the Polotsk depot of the Belarusian Railway. In 2005, due to the redundancy of the number of cars on the routes used, it was decided to split each of the ten-car DDB1 multiple units into two parts, supplementing them with head cars similar to the DRB1 multiple units. For this purpose, the Riga Carriage Works manufactured 20 DRB2 head cars of 63-550 model, standardized with the head cars of ER2 and ER9 electric multiple units with a straight cab. Thus, 20 push-pull trains were reassembled, each consisting of six passenger cars and one diesel locomotive unit. During service, many trains had their composition reduced to five cars. Diesel locomotive units are sometimes transferred from one trainset to another as needed and during maintenance, including by borrowing 2M62 unit from DRB1 series sets. As of 2026, 15 trainsets are operated at the Vitebsk depot (with 2M62U) and five at the Orsha depot (mainly with 2M62). For train formation, 2M62 locomotives numbered 1096, 1126, 1229, and 1238 and 2M62U locomotives numbered 0261, 0262, 0270, 0271, 0308, and 0313 are used; previously, the decommissioned 2M62-0989 and 0990 and the 2M62U-0310, modernized into two single locomotives and returned to freight service, were also employed.

In 2000, the machine-building plant built an eight-car DPSaAZ multiple unit (diesel train of the Sayan Aluminum Plant) of a similar design for the departmental railway of the Sayanogorsk Aluminum Plant in Russia, modernizing three locomotives (DM62-1811, DM62-1815, and DM62-1857) for it. The multiple unit has been in service since May 2000 on the Predzavodskaya–Sayanogorsk section of the departmental railway line, which is 19 km (12 mi) long, and is used to transport the aluminum plant workers. During service, the train's composition was reduced to 6 cars. Periodically, one of the units of the M62 locomotive is sent for maintenance and replaced with a TEM15-100 locomotive. For a long time, since the late 2000s, after the decommissioning of the DPM1 and DT116 multiple units, this trainset remained the only operational push-pull type train in Russia until the appearance of the DP2D train in 2025.

2M62U-0308 unit as part of the DDB1 multiple unit

DDB1 multiple unit from the DRB2 head car in a shortened three-car formation

=== DTL1 and DPL1 ===
In 1996, the Luhansk Locomotive Works, which manufactured the M62 locomotives themselves, simultaneously with the new DEL-01 diesel multiple unit, built eight new intermediate cars for Ukrainian Railways, standardized with the cars of this multiple unit, forming a "push-pull" train together with the 2M62-1051 locomotive, which had undergone modernization. From 1996 until the early 2000s, the Luhansk plant produced a total of 32 intermediate cars of this type (presumably two cars were taken from the later disbanded DAL-01). Based on these cars, several trainsets were formed using two units of 2M62 and 2TE116 locomotives, which had been previously manufactured and also underwent modernization (presumably, two trainsets were composed of four cars). Multiple units with 2M62 locomotives were designated DTL1, and those with 2TE116 locomotives were designated DTL2 (Luhansk diesel train with locomotive traction), although this designation was not applied to multiple units. The exact number of trainsets of each type has not been established; the majority of the cars were used to form DTL2 multiple units.

Due to the excessive power of two units for a single trainset, in 2001 the plant began production of DPL1 multiple units (diesel train from Luhansk, type 1) with head cars that were standardized in design of the mechanical part with the motor cars of the DEL-01 diesel multiple unit, but with a passenger compartment instead of a machinery compartment. From 2001 to 2004, four three-car DPL1 sets were built, consisting of a head car and two intermediate cars, and in 2008—an additional two DPL1 head cars, with the cars to be coupled with them taken from DTL1 trainsets. For these sets, locomotive units from 2M62-1113, 1114, and 1001 were modernized. Similarly, six four-car DPL2 sets were built using the 2TE116 unit.

The DPL1 and DTL1 multiple units were delivered to the Kovel and Kolomyia motor-car depots of the Lviv Railway. As of 2026, they continue to operate at the Kolomyia depot, although often in shortened formations: two cars in the case of the DPL1 and four-, five-, or six-car formations in the case of the DTL1. One of the units of the 2M62-1051 locomotive in the DTL1 trainset was written off in 2022 and replaced with a single M62-1457 locomotive.

2M62-1051 locomotive as part of the DTL1 multiple unit

2M62-1001 locomotive unit in the DPL1-006 trainset composition

DPL1-006 trainset head car

=== DPM1 ===
2M62U-0127 as part the DPM1 trainset in Moscow

In 2000, the Moscow Locomotive Repair Plant, which carried out major repairs and modernization of ER2 electric multiple units with an extension of their service life and assignment of a new EM2 series, formed the DPM1 trainset (Moscow diesel train, 1st type) using units of the 2M62U-0011 locomotive and 12 intermediate trailer cars from previously decommissioned ER2 electric multiple units for the Moscow Railway. The locomotive underwent modernization for push-pull operation, while the cars received major repairs similar to those conducted for EM2 electric multiple units. The trainset was delivered to the TCh-22 Novomoskovsk-1 depot and from June 2000 to July 2005 operated as an express train on the Urvanka–Uzlovaya-1–Moscow-Passazhirskiy-Paveletsky route. By 2004, the 2M62U-0011 locomotive was replaced with an identical locomotive numbered 0127, which had also undergone modernization, and returned to freight service. On 25 July 2005, the trainset made its last run on the route, after which it was withdrawn from service. Since February 2007, the trainset was transferred to suburban routes of the Tula Suburban Transport Directorate, with the locomotives and the remaining five cars repainted green. In May 2008, the trainset was withdrawn from service and dismantled. The 2M62U-0127 locomotive was returned to freight service (as previously 2M62U-0011), while the cars were decommissioned and subsequently remained on the premises of the depots in Novomoskovsk and Tula.

== Repair plants ==
- Poltava Locomotive Repair Plant (Ukraine)
- Michurinsk Locomotive Repair Plant
- Ussuriysk Locomotive Repair Plant
- Minsk Locomotive Repair Plant (Belarus)
- Poznańskie Zakłady Naprawcze Taboru Kolejowego (Poland)
- Daugavpils Locomotive Repair Plant (Latvia)

== Nicknames ==
This locomotive has a certain cult following among rail enthusiasts, and is referred to by several nicknames, usually derived from its Soviet provenance:

- Gagarin in Poland – from the space flight pioneer
- Gagar in Poland – shortened for Gagarin
- Iwan/Ivan or Siergiej/Sergej in Poland or Czechoslovakia – from two popular Russian names
- Szergej in Hungary – from a popular Russian name
- Taigatrommel (Taiga drum) in Germany – from the amount of noise and vibration the locomotive, the first locomotives was exported to the GDR without exhaust silencers.
- Stalin's last revenge in Germany – for the same reason.
- Mukha (Russian: Муха = fly) in Belarus.
- Sinsŏng (Korean: 신성 = Nova) in North Korea.
- Mashka (Russian: Машка) (diminutive of Maria, a reference to the "M" designation) in the Soviet Union and Russia
- Marusya (Variation of Mashka/Maria) in Ukraine
- Meška in Lithuania
- 2ZAGAL (Mongolian: 2-ЗАГАЛ = White Horse) in Mongolia — for their small class of modernized M62s with a primarily gray body.

== In popular culture ==
In the filming of the 1985 movie "Train Off Schedule", the M62-1255 and M62-1259 were involved.

== See also ==
- Kŭmsŏng-class locomotive – North Korean unlicensed copy of the M62 locomotive
- Newag 311D – the Polish ST44 locomotive modernization
- Imported M62 locomotives in Poland
