= Natalya Vavilova =

Russian film actress (born 1959)

- Born: Natalya Dmitrievna Vavilova; 26 January 1959 (age 67); Moscow, RSFSR, USSR
- Occupation: Actress
- Years active: 1974—1991

Natalya Dmitrievna Vavilova (Russian: Наталья Дмитриевна Вавилова, born 26 January 1959) is a Russian film actress.

== Biography ==
Natalya Vavilova started her career as an actress at the age of fourteen. She appeared in several pictures in supporting roles. In 1984, Natalya Vavilova graduated from the All-Union State Institute of Cinematography, studying under Yevgeny Matveyev, an acclaimed Russian actor and director. Her classmate was Alim Kouliev. Success and fame followed her role of Aleksandra Tikhomirova in the Academy Award for Best Foreign Language Film picture Moscow Does Not Believe in Tears.

While being filmed for the picture Nikolai Podvoisky, she fell from a horse and suffered a spinal trauma. Her last film was The Sukhovo-Kobylin Case. After she accomplished that work, Natalya Vavilova stopped pursuing her acting career. Since that time she has avoided all contacts with the press. She lived with her husband, Russian film director Samvel Gasparov, in a house twelve kilometers from Moscow. She is involved in floriculture and philanthropy. On May 26, 2020, her husband, film director Samvel Gasparov, died from COVID-19.

== Filmography ==
- The Sukhovo-Kobylin Case (1991) (TV)
- Road Hawks (1990)
- Nayezdniki (1987)
- The Barman from "Golden Anchor" (1986)
- The Time of Sons (1986)
- Do Not Marry, Girls (1985)
- Train Off Schedule (1985)
- Victory (1984)
- My Elected (1984)
- Streak of luck (1983)
- The Doctor's Pupil (1983)
- We Weren't Married in Church (1982)
- The Driver for One Trip (1981) (TV)
- Moscow Does Not Believe in Tears (1979)
- Polovodye (1980)
- Invasion (1980)
- Heavy water (1979)
- Chest of Drawers Was Led Through the Street (1978)
- Red Diplomatic Couriers (1977)
- Practical Joke (1976)
