= Do Not Marry, Girls =

- Directed by: Yevgeni Gerasimov
- Written by: Sergei Bodrov; Natalya Mitina
- Starring: Vyacheslav Nevinny; Tatyana Dogileva; Victor Pavlov; Yuriy Nazarov; Lyubov Sokolova; Natalya Vavilova
- Music by: Yevgeny Krylatov
- Production company: Gorky Film Studio
- Release date: 1985
- Running time: 70 minutes
- Country: Soviet Union
- Language: Russian

Do Not Marry, Girls (Russian: Не ходите, девки, замуж, romanized: Ne khodite, devki, zamuzh) is a 1985 Soviet musical film directed by Yevgeni Gerasimov.

== Plot ==
Ivan Savelich Malkov, the dedicated chairman of a prosperous Soviet collective farm, worries about the wellbeing of his rural community even while on an overseas cruise. On returning, he discovers that the young women of Bolshie Ugorody village, weary of a shortage of eligible men, are leaving en masse for the city. Determined to keep them in the village, Malkov encourages them to form a folk choir, promising that a televised performance at a fair might attract potential suitors to them instead. Meanwhile, Malkov also tries to invite his famous singer friend Valery Leontiev to perform, though Leontiev remains too busy to break free from his adoring Moscow fans. Soon after, a TV broadcast covering the choir's performance unexpectedly thrusts the village into the spotlight.

As Malkov pursues his vision to construct a large livestock complex for the collective farm, he finds his plans obstructed by local bureaucrats and directly petitions a high-ranking Soviet construction minister, whom he meets at a biathlon event. Impressed by the televised choir, the minister grants Malkov's request. Following the broadcast, prospective grooms from all over the Soviet Union flock to the village, but the women unexpectedly depart for a nationwide tour along the Baikal-Amur Mainline and even to Japan at the invitation of the Minister of Culture. To the dismayed suitors left behind, Malkov ingeniously proposes they stay on as farmworkers while awaiting the choir's return.

== Cast ==
- Vyacheslav Nevinny as Ivan Savelievich Malkov, the chairman of the collective farm
- Tatyana Dogileva as Valya, an agronomist
- Valery Leontiev (cameo)
- Natalya Vavilova as milkmaid
- Victor Pavlov as Victor Skorobeynikov
- Yury Nazarov as Chairman of the Commission
- Lyubov Sokolova as Praskovya Ilinichna
- Stefaniya Staniyuta
- Raisa Ryazanova as Anna Ilinichna
- Nikolay Parfyonov as Trofimov
- Yevgeny Steblov as Andrey, barber
- Tatyana Agafonova as Natalia Soldatova, a milkmaid
- Svetlana Ryabova as Olya Dyomina
- Marina Ustimenko as milkmaid
- Nina Ruslanova as Anisa Ilinichna
