= Train Off Schedule =

- Directed by: Aleksandr Grishin
- Written by: Aleksandr Grishin; Aleksei Leontyev; Anatoli Tsarenko
- Starring: Vladimir Shevelkov; Igor Shavlak; Natalya Vavilova
- Cinematography: Viktor Kabachenko; Vladimir Pankov
- Edited by: Vera Bejlis
- Music by: Grigori Gladkov
- Production company: Odessa Film Studio
- Release date: June 1985
- Running time: 80 minutes
- Country: Soviet Union
- Language: Russian

Train Off Schedule (Russian: Поезд вне расписания, romanized: Poezd vne raspisaniya) is a 1985 Soviet disaster film written and directed by Aleksandr Grishin.

== Plot ==
The crew of diesel locomotive M62 receives the task to drive out the team from the "cold" (with the engine off) the locomotive M62, the platform and the passenger car. On this day the driver Fyodor Ivanovich Morgunov does not feel very well. While waiting for the departure of the train number 4042, the driver sends an assistant to mark the route sheet. After that, from a sudden heart attack, the driver loses consciousness, and, falling, grabs at the helm of the driver's controller, transferring it to the upright position. The locomotive with the train spontaneously comes into motion and gathers speed near 100 km/h (66 miles/h), uncontrollable. The device of vigilance can not stop the locomotive, because due to a malfunction the driver, in accordance with the order of the dispatcher, disconnected this device.

To avoid collision, the dispatcher first decides to start the trip into a trapping deadlock and at the same time take measures against fire and explosion. But when it becomes clear that on the train, people, the dispatcher decides to provide a pass-through ("green street"). After the rink one section of the locomotive 2TE10L is started up.

A student of the railway vocational school Aleksei Nechaev was let into the car by this train driver, and Vlad, Galya and Marina go as stowaways. The guys suspect something is wrong, only when the train at full speed sweeps past the station they needed Belyaevka and a red railway traffic light. With a total of five headlamps: in two sections of two headlamps, below which the lowest moon-white flashing headlamp is used only if the station stationary system for effective control of railway traffic is damaged and the railway driver is required to pass through the first railway arrow at speeds of up to 25 km/h (16 mph), and continue after it slowly with readiness to stop emergency). The purpose of lighting the lower stationary section is to show the train driver the speed of movement from the first railway station with an arrow to the exit of the railway signal, and in the upper stationary section of the speed at the exit of the railway signal. About a minute later, when turning onto the railway through a door open along the railway car, one of the young men sees that the train does not slow down and passes by a railway traffic light with three headlights, illuminated by a prohibitive red light. . The attempt to brake the trip with a stop-cock was unsuccessful, since the brake line was disconnected. Aleksei, after counting that the driver needs help, decides to get to the driver's cabin, passing through the convoy on the run-first along the cargo platform, and then, having got into the cabin of the "cold" diesel locomotive through the window, gets out through the hatch to the roof and through it gets to the leader locomotive. Having got into the "cold" diesel locomotive, the guys notice the diesel locomotive next to them to help, but Aleksei still intends to go into the driver's cab, while Vlad insists on waiting for the diesel locomotive. Because of this, the guys quarrel and fight, as a result, Alexei goes further and, albeit with a risk, gets inside the leading diesel locomotive. Seeing this, Vlad, who was on the trail, remains on the roof of the "cold" diesel locomotive.

However, at the crossing, the locomotive 2TE10L collides with the trailer of the ZIL-130 truck, whose driver decided to "slip" around the closed road barriers along a section of the road on which there is no road deck, and the trailer was stuck between the rails. As a result of the collision, despite the fact that for solemn braking, the driver gets injured, and the locomotive is damaged. The attempt to catch up with the train fails.

Even before the train leaves, the floor of the platform wagon is partially dismantled so that the gravel and rotating wheelsets are visible, only a person can move along the steel beams. Meanwhile, on the leading locomotive there is a fire in the diesel compartment. Alexei tries to cope with the flames on his own, but he can not go into the cabin to Feodor Ivanovich, because the door handle is hot . As a result of the fierce thudding on the deformed door of the command locomotive cabin, as a result of the fire in the engine locomotive compartment, one of the two teenage passengers (at this time the two girl passengers are waiting in the passenger sleeping car hooked up after the platform railway wagon) collapses in full height on the floor in the front cab of the leading railway locomotive railway driver - the same wakes up and anxiously peeks around . Simultaneously, rescuers land on a hot diesel locomotive with a helicopter, and all those who were on the train remain alive. A fire truck, an ambulance and police arrive, with on-duty medics escorting the temporarily conscious locomotive driver out of the front command locomotive and carrying him to the ambulance on a stretcher. The film reveals the theme of interpersonal relationships and strategies in complex, sometimes deadly situations.

== Cast ==
- Vladimir Shevelkov as Alexei Nechaev (voiced by Vyacheslav Baranov)
- Igor Shavlak as Vlad (voiced by Oleg Menshikov)
- Natalya Vavilova as Galya
- Olga Kuznetsova as Marina
- Elena Aminova as dispatcher of Knyazevka railway station
- Anatoly Salimonenko as episode
- Boris Seidenberg as railway traffic controller
- Anatoly Barchuk as Head of Dispatch Service
- Andrey Gonchar as railway traffic controller
- Oleg Fedulov as truck driver with a trailer, stuck on the rails at the crossing (also a stuntman of the film)
- Anatoly Lukyanenko as Zhigulin, assistant locomotive driver
- Victor Chutak Yarov as Igor Andreevich (sounded by Yuri Sarantsev)
- Vladimir Volkov as Engineer Morgunov (voiced by Yuri Sarantsev)
- Victor Izmailov as Alexander Ivanovich Nikonov, the locomotive machinist
