= Transmash =

Transmash may refer to:

- Engineering companies:
  - Transmashholding, a group of Russian engineering firms specialising in locomotive and rolling stock building, and diesel engine manufacture
  - Omsktransmash, A heavy engineering company based in Omsk
  - JSC Transmash, a Russian rolling stock company based in the Saratov Oblast
  - Transmash, Tikhvin, mechanical engineering plant in Tikhvin; former Centrolit and Kirov works subsidiary plants
- Sport:
  - FC Transmash Mogilev, a former Belarusian football club based in Mahilyov
  - Transmash Stadium, a multi-use stadium in Mogilev, Belarus
