= Comodoro Py (Buenos Aires) =

- Locality
- Location within Buenos Aires Province
- Country: Argentina
- Province: Buenos Aires Province
- Partido: Bragado

Government
  - Mayor: Sergio Barenghi (PJ–UxP)
- Elevation: 61 m (200 ft)

Population (2010)
  - Total: 634
- Time zone: UTC−3
- Postal code: B6641
- Dialing code: 02342

Comodoro Py is a locality in the Bragado Partido of Buenos Aires Province, Argentina.

Located in a rural setting, Comodoro Py originated with the extension of a railway branch line and was settle primarily by agricultural workers, With a population of fewer that 700, the town is designated as the "National Capital of Cured Sausage"

== Current situation and development ==
Comodoro Py is a rural village located 8 km from National Route 5 (Argentina), which is the nearest paved road, and 30 km from the city of Bragado, the seat of the partido.

Among the town’s main economic activities are grain storage facilities operated by the company La Bragadense and the Peagro Cooperative, the latter composed of local residents and landowners.

Cured sausage production is seasonal, limited to the winter months, and involves only a few small-scale producers with low profit margins. Nevertheless, the community has successfully leveraged this specialty to organize an annual festival that grows in popularity each year.

Some residents also produce homemade preserves, though mainly for personal consumption. Other economic activities include metal lathe work. Honey production was once common but suffered a collapse due to disease and the use of antibiotics, leading to the total cessation of the activity. A handful of artisans engage in crafts using reed, thread braiding, wool, and sewing.

The town is equipped with basic services, including drinking water, a sewage treatment plant, and internet service—being one of the first in the area to have broadband access. It also has a gas station and once had a hotel, which closed many years ago.

There is currently an open-air waste dump that is scheduled for closure and environmental recovery. All waste will soon be transferred to the recycling and sorting plant operated by the municipality in Bragado. Residents are preparing for this transition by sorting their household waste prior to collection.

Comodoro Py has a kindergarten with 40 students, a primary school (EGB) with 165 students, and a secondary school (Polimodal) with 25 students, the latter offering a specialization in business administration.

== Toponymy ==
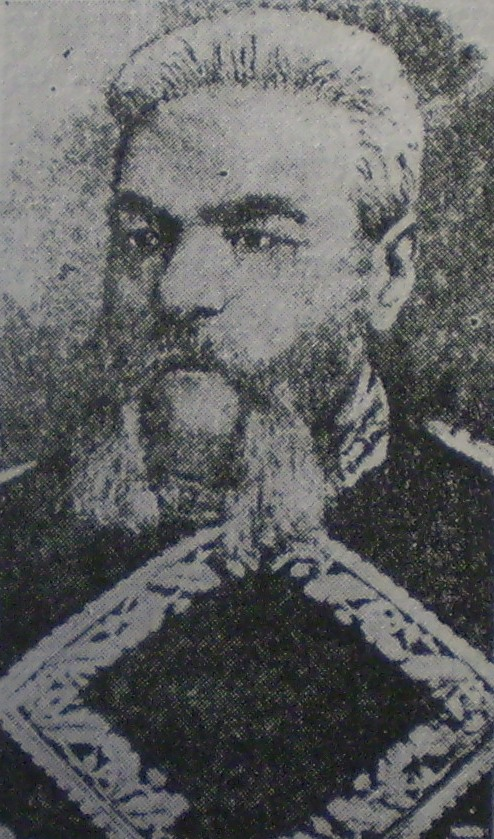
Luis Py.

The town is named in honor of Commodore Luis Py, a Spanish-born naval officer who arrived in the Río de la Plata in 1843 and soon joined the Argentine Navy. Between 1871 and 1872, he served as military commander of Martín García Island. He is especially remembered for leading the so-called "Py Expedition" in 1878, which was ordered by President Nicolás Avellaneda and sent to the Cañadón de los Misioneros in the province of Santa Cruz. There, on December 1, he hoisted the Argentine flag as an affirmation of national sovereignty over Patagonian waters, which were under threat from foreign vessels. One of the ships involved in this expedition was the Uruguay Corvette, which is now on display in Puerto Madero, Buenos Aires.

A destroyer bearing his name, ARA Comodoro Py (D-27), also took part in the Falklands War, joining the recovery operation on March 28, 1982. It remained active through the conflict, becoming the last warship to return to BNPB (Base Naval Puerto Belgrano) between July 12 and 14, 1982. It logged the greatest number of nautical miles under combat conditions among Argentine vessels during the war.

== Population ==
According to the 2010 Argentine Census, Comodoro Py had a population of 634, representing a 2.6% decrease from the 651 recorded in the 2001 Census.

Historic population data:

- 1980: 742
- 1991: 702
- 2001: 651
- 2010: 634

Source: Based on national census data from INDEC
