= Transmashholding =

Russian rolling stock manufacturer

JSC Transmashholding
- Type: Closed Joint Stock Company
- Industry: Railway Transportation
- Founded: Russia, 2002
- Headquarters: Moscow, Russia
- Number of locations: 14 in Russia, 1 in Germany, 1 in Argentina
- Area served: Worldwide
- Products: locomotives, railway vehicles
- Services: repair operations and service maintenance
- Revenue: $5.92 billion (2025)
- Operating income: $165 million (2017)
- Net income: ₽20,5 billion (2025)
- Total assets: $2.34 billion (2017)
- Total equity: $1.09 billion (2017)
- Number of employees: more than 100,000
- Website: www.tmholding.ru

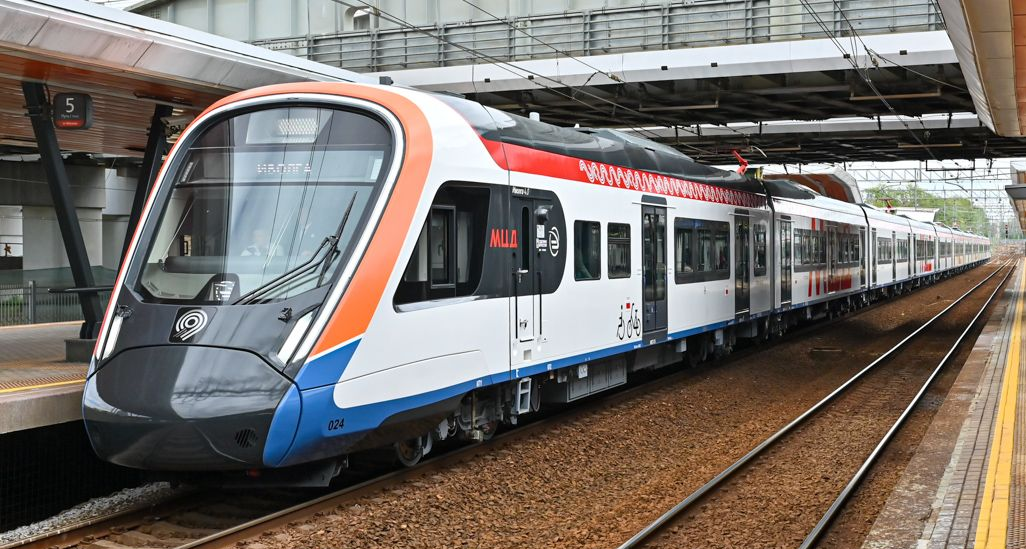
EGE2Tv EMU Train

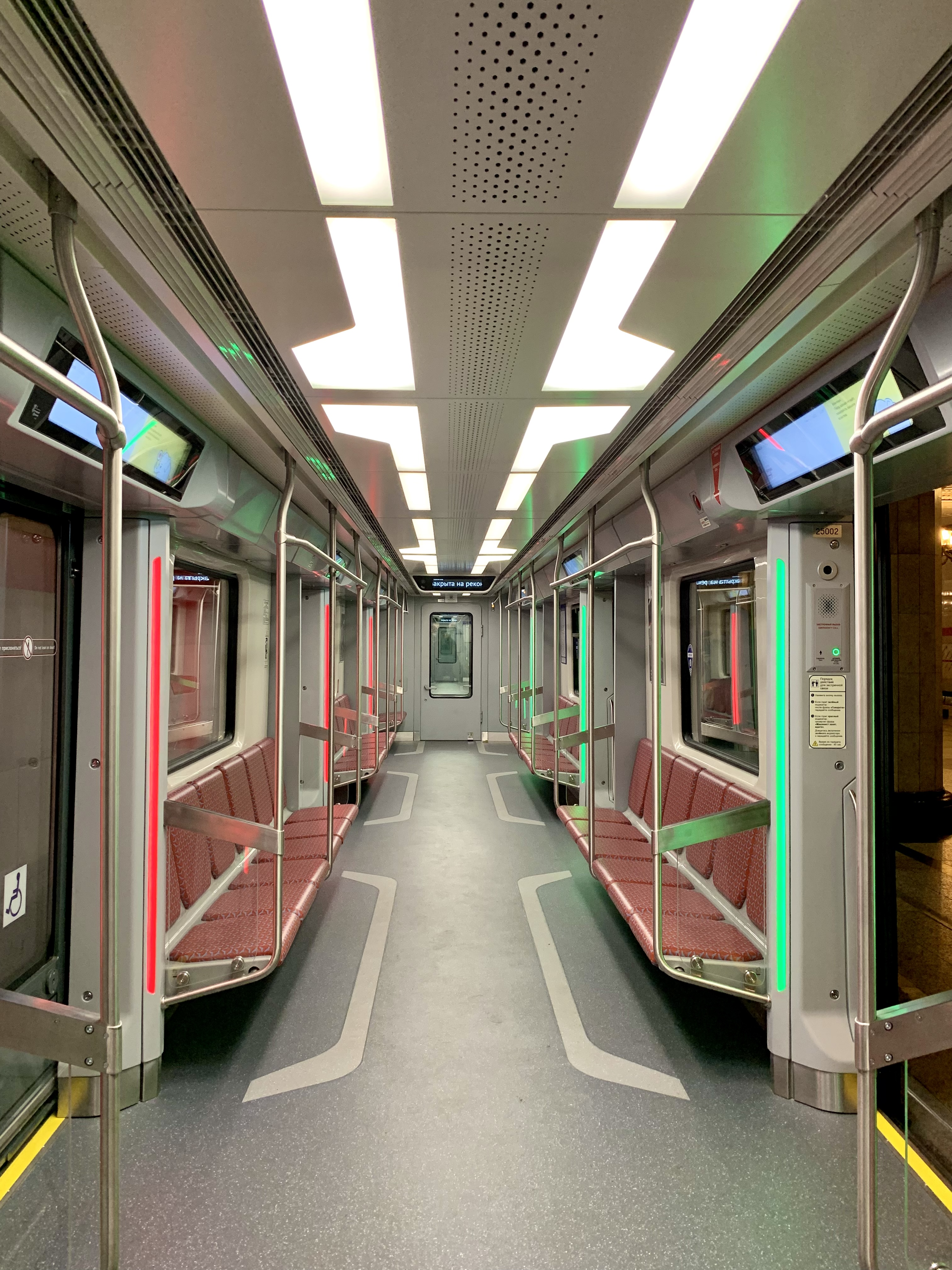
Interior of Metro 81–725 in St. Petersburg

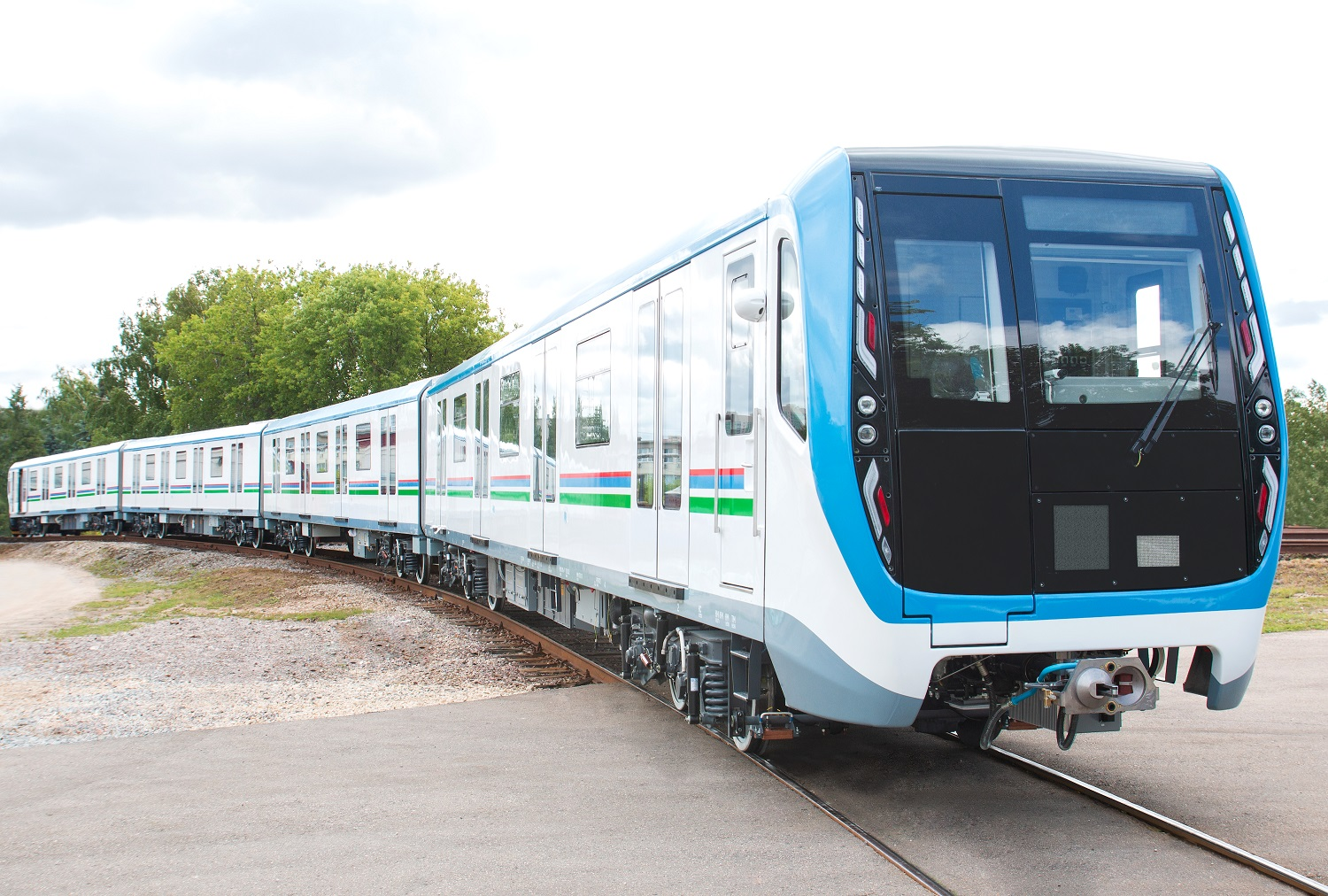
81-765 Train

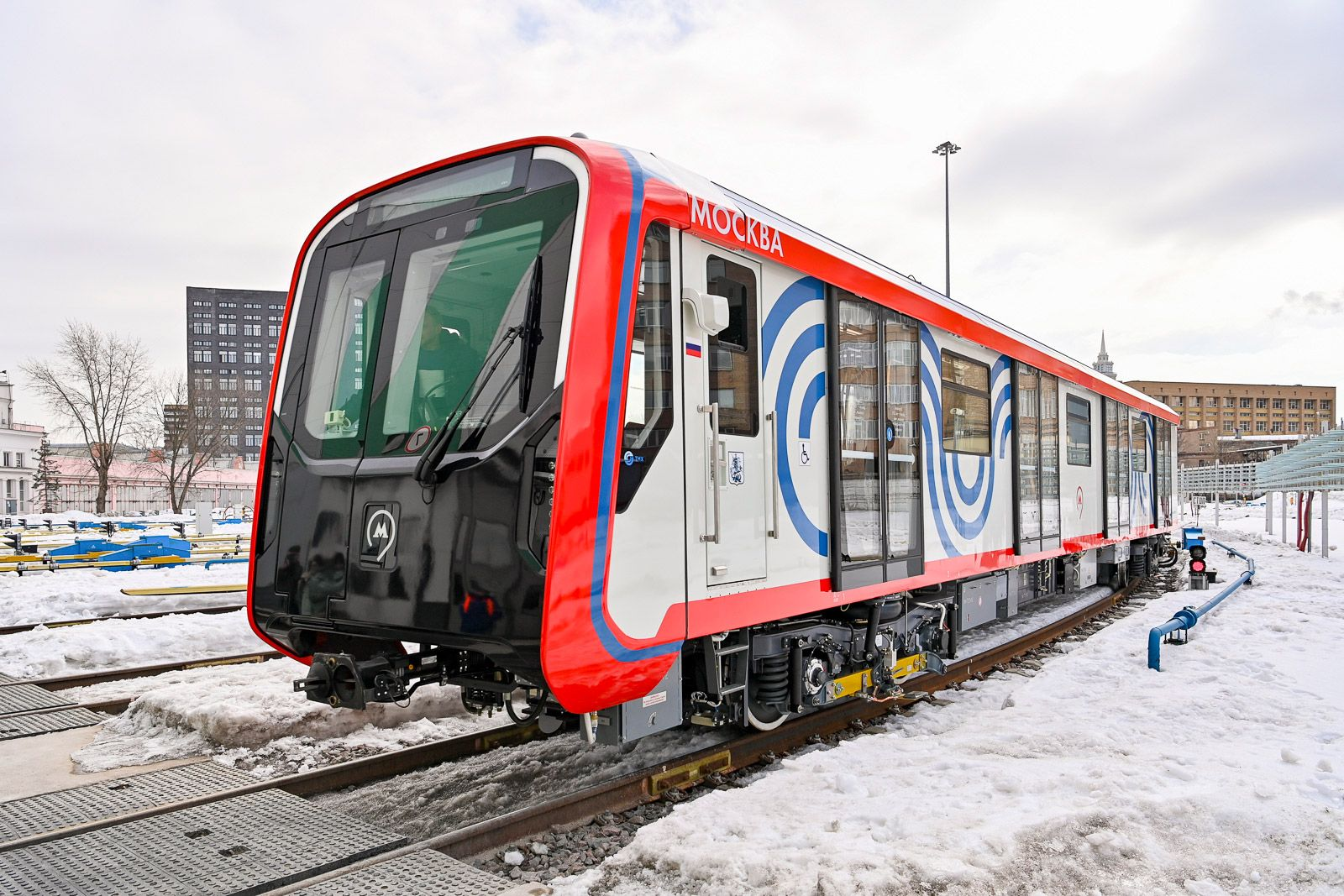
81-775.2

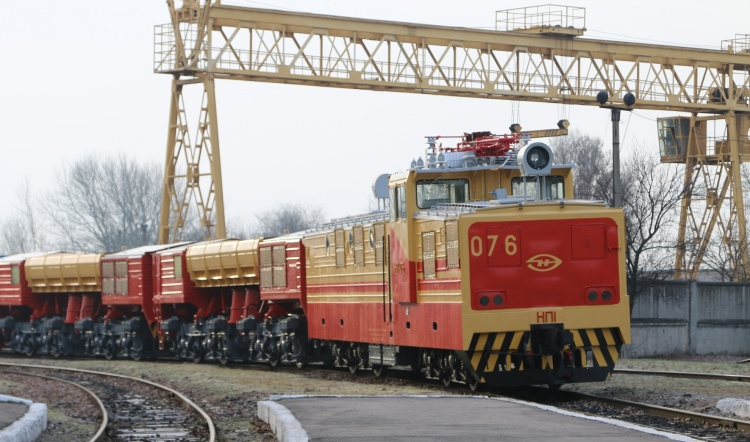
NP1-076

JSC Transmashholding (Russian: Трансмашхолдинг) is the largest manufacturer of rolling stock and rail equipment in Russia, and after merging with LocoTech service, the fourth largest engineering company in the field of transport technology globally.

The company includes 10 production sites in Russia.

== History ==
JSC Transmashholding was established in 2002. In 2012, Transmashholding took in 130 billion rubles in revenue. This revenue represents a 22 percent increase over 2011 revenues.

In 2005, Transmashholding established a joint venture with the German company Siemens AG, Transconverter LLC, which specializes in the development of high-voltage static converters for passenger coaches, electric locomotives, and electric multiple units (EMUs). The company later acquired FTD Dessau, the oldest engineering and manufacturing center in Europe.

On February 16, 2009, Transmashholding acquired a 50.48% stake in JSC VELNII from the Moscow-based investment group JSC Investment Group Rosvagonmash, which was closely affiliated with Russian Railways (RZD).

In December 2015, RZD approved the sale of its 25%+1 share in the company (The Breakers Investments BV). Alstom's stake in the company was increased to 33% by the end of 2015.

In December 2017, the company paid US$3 million for the concession and refurbishment of the Mechita workshops in Bragado. Argentina. The site is part of a planned US$200 million investment by the company in the country to produce parts for the railway industry and rolling stock if it is successful in bidding in SOFSE's large tender offers. In 2021, the company's revenue amounted to 103 billion rubles.

In February 2021, TMH was said to acquire Bergen Engines from Rolls-Royce, for approximately 150 million euros, but the sale was stopped by the Norwegian government due to national security concerns.

Transmashholding was put on a sanctions list by the Ukrainian government and the US Department of the Treasury in September 2023.

In 2023, a consortium formed by Transmashholding and the Indian company Rail Vikas Nigam won an international tender for the manufacture and 35-year servicing of 120 16-car Vande Bharat Sleeper long-distance electric trainsets, developed by ICF, for Indian Railways (1,920 cars in total). The second bidder, a consortium of Bharat Heavy Electricals and Titagarh Rail Systems, was awarded a contract for 80 trainsets. The manufacturing facility of the Russian-Indian joint venture Kinet Railway Solutions is located in the city of Latur, while an engineering center operates in Hyderabad.

At various times, Transmashholding owned such enterprises as the Engels Transport Engineering Plant (sold in 2024), the Bezhitsky Steel Plant (sold in 2024), and the Oktyabrsky Electric Railway Car Repair Plant (sold in 2025).

Outside Russia, the company owned the Fahrzeugtechnik Dessau in Germany (until 2008), TMH Hungary and TMH Hungary Invest in Hungary (sold in 2022), a plant in Boksburg, South Africa (sold in 2022), and the Mechita repair plant in Argentina (sold in 2023). In addition, Transmashholding owned a 25% stake in Kazakhstan's Electric Locomotive Assembly Plant (EKZ) and a 50% stake in Kazakhstan's Locomotive Assembly Plant (LKZ); these stakes were sold in 2024.

== Ownership ==
In 2018 Transmashholding was 100% owned by Breakers Investments B.V, a holding registered under Dutch law. Alstom owned 20% in this structure, while companies owned by Iskander Makhmudov, Andrei Bokarev, Dmitry Komissarov and Kirill Lipa, accounted for about 79,4%, Komissarov and Lipa being controlling shareholders by October 2021.

In January 2024, Alstom sold its shareholding to Russian investors. As of May 2024, Transmashholding is 100% owned by Russian shareholders.

The President of the company was Andrei Bokarev until April 2022, when he stepped down after being sanctioned, the chairman of the board of directors was Dmitry Komissarov until October 2023 when he ceased to be a member of the Board of Directors of Transmashholding, and the company's CEO is Kirill Lipa as of October 2021.

== Activities ==
The company actively works with JSC Russian Railways, the Ministry of Transportation of the Russian Federation, and other Russian Federation ministries, including Ministry of Industry and Power, Ministry of Economic Development and Trade, and Ministry of Finance.

Russian Railways is the company's biggest customer. The company manufactures and sells subway cars, passenger diesel locomotives, diesel engines, freight cars, flat cars, and diesel trains. Transmashholding used to have major customers in Azerbaijan, Bulgaria, Belarus, Egypt, Kazakhstan, Mongolia, Uzbekistan, Hungary, Serbia, and formerly Ukraine.

=== Products ===
Transmasholding manufactures diesel-locomotive shunters, main-line and electric industrial locomotives, passenger and freight cars, electric train cars, locomotive and marine diesels, car castings and other products. The company has provided railcars to Warsaw Metro and Baku Metro, among others.

In October 2021 Transmashholding announced that a commercial launch of a new and sophisticated double-decker shuttle train is coming soon.

Products
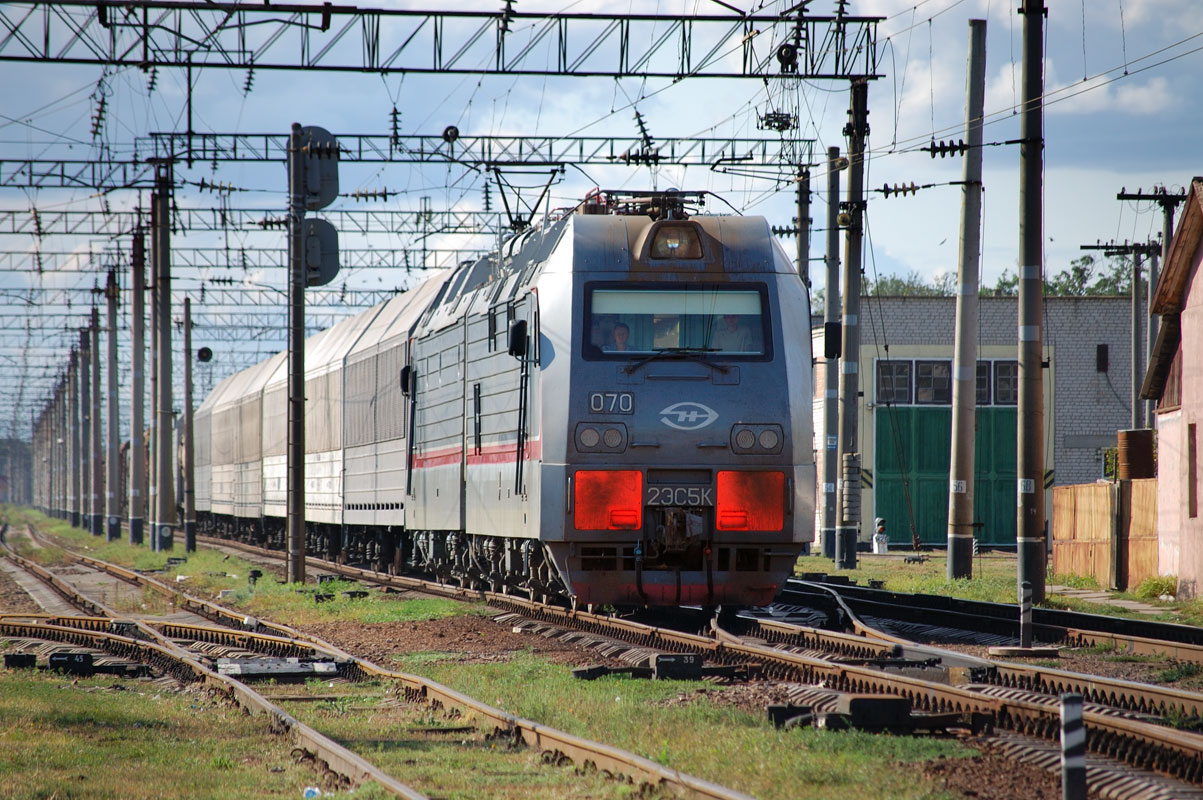
NEVZ 2ES5K locomotives (2008)

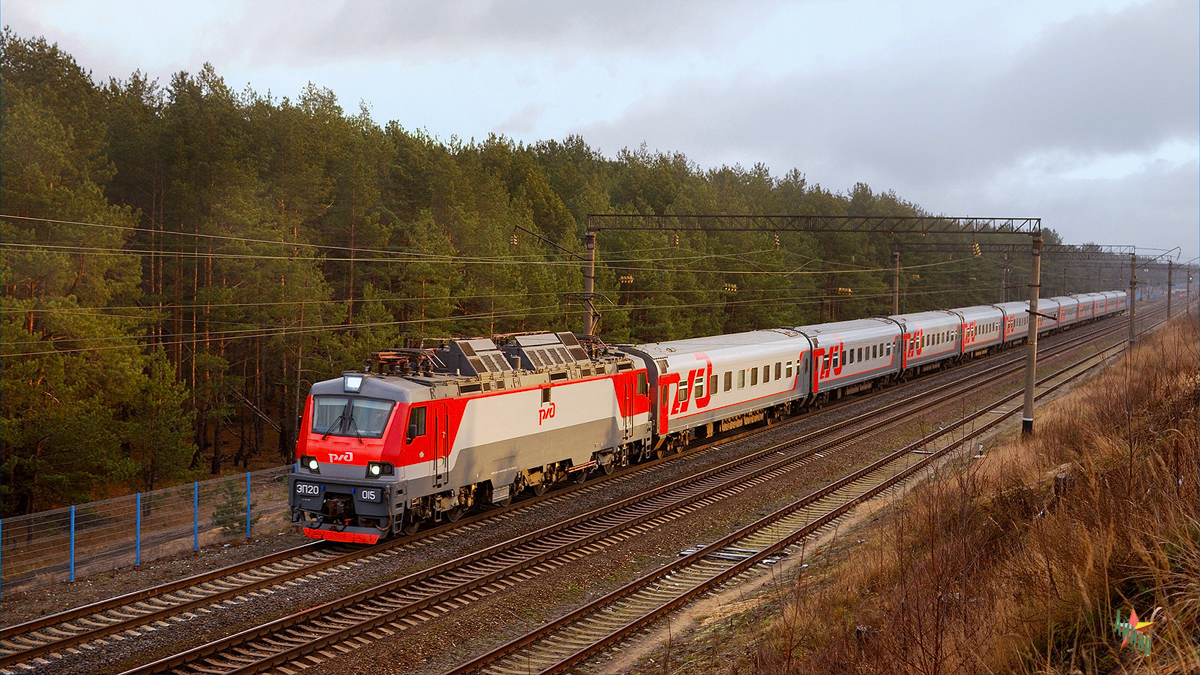
NEVZ EP20 (2013)

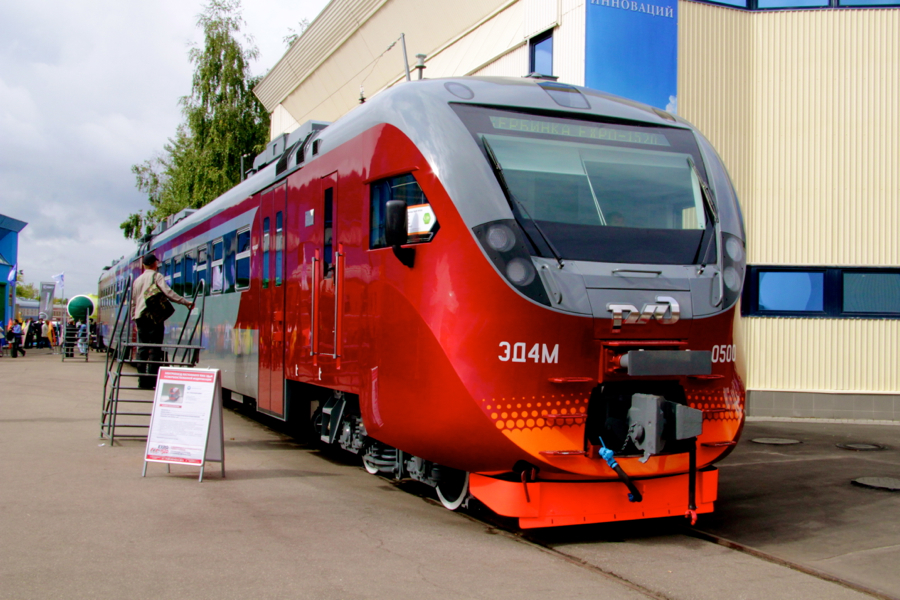
Demikhovo EMU train ED4M (2011)

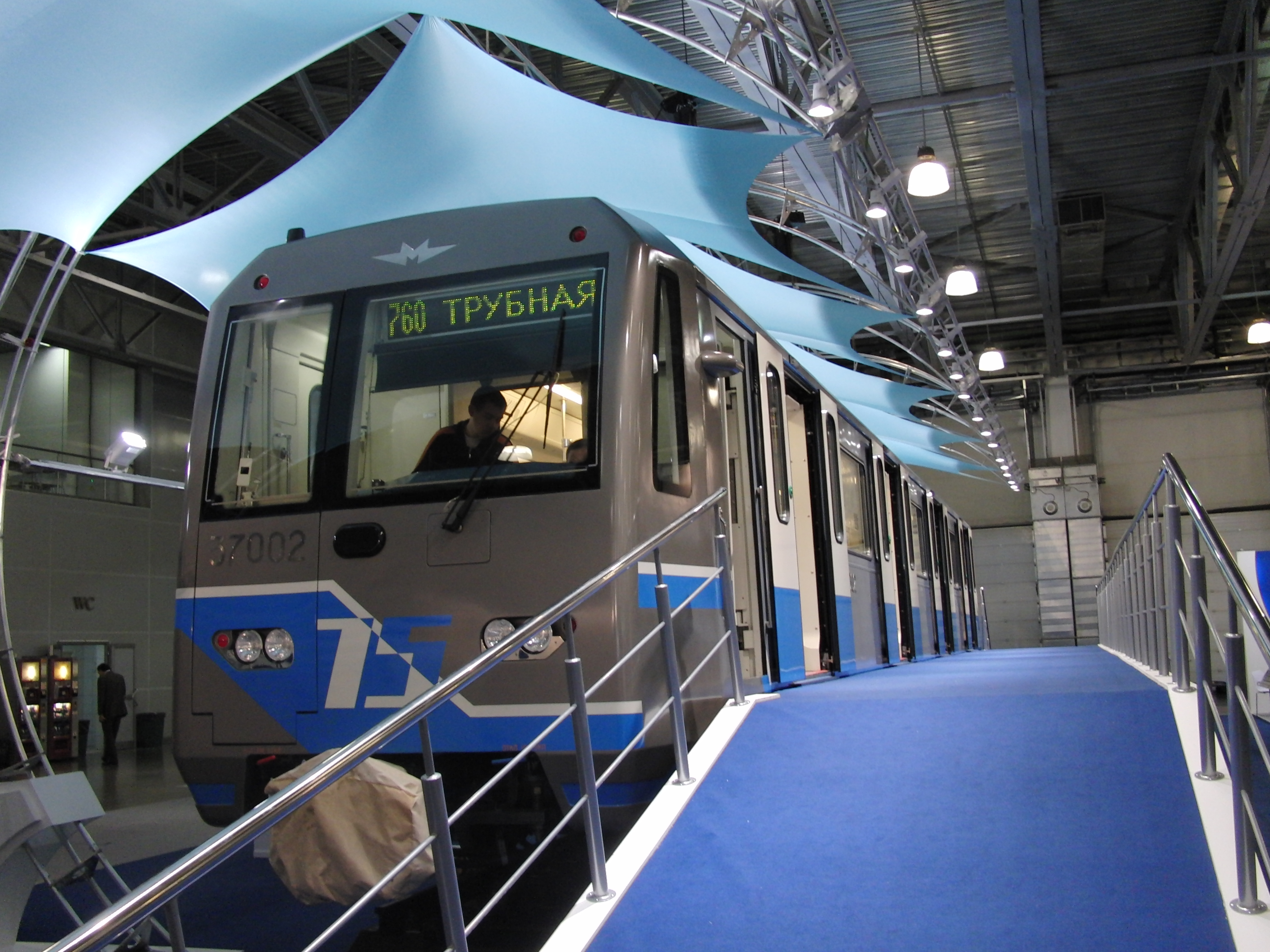
Metrovagonmash 81-760/761 Metro car (2010)

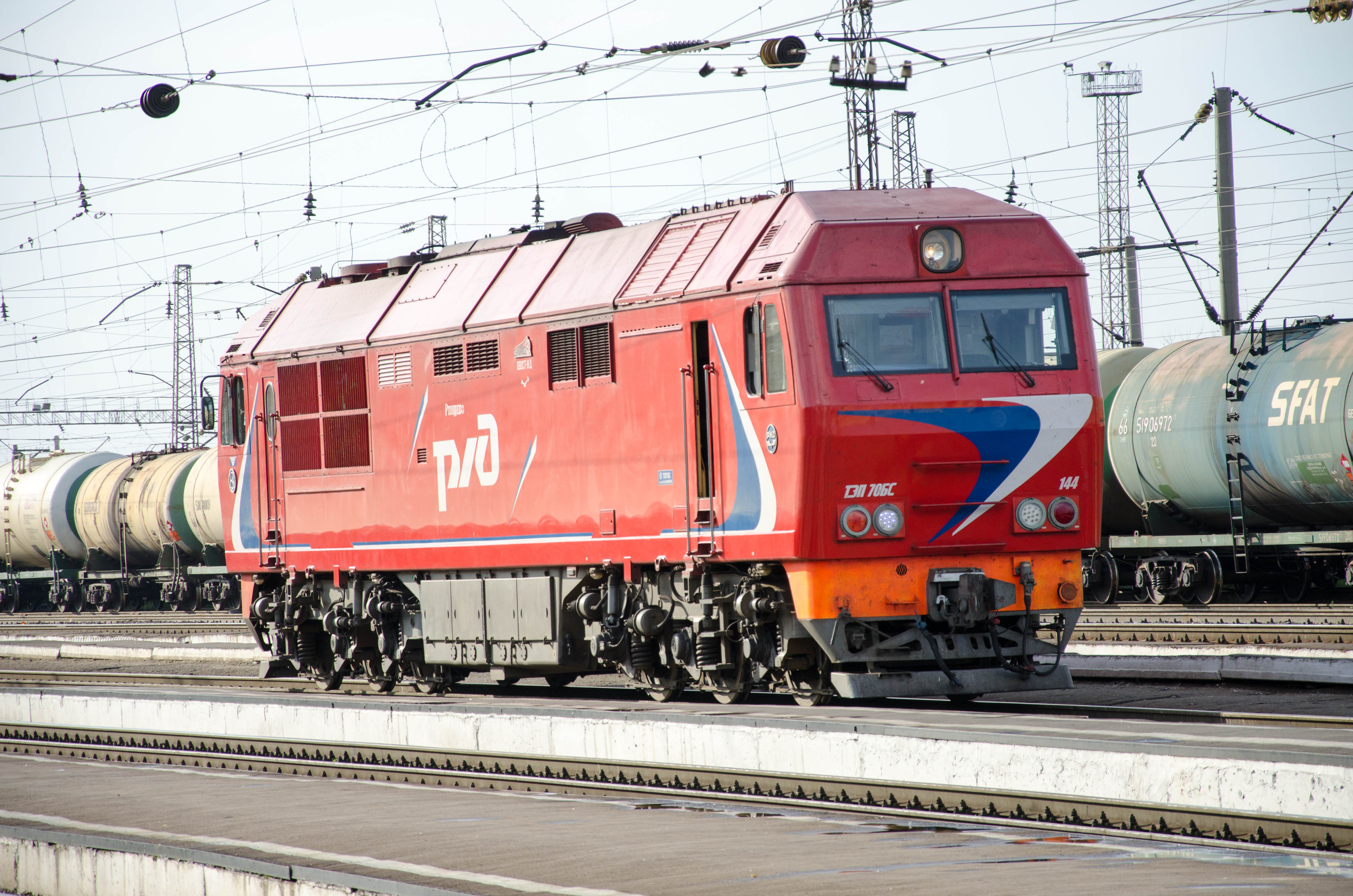
Kolomna TEP70BS (2012)

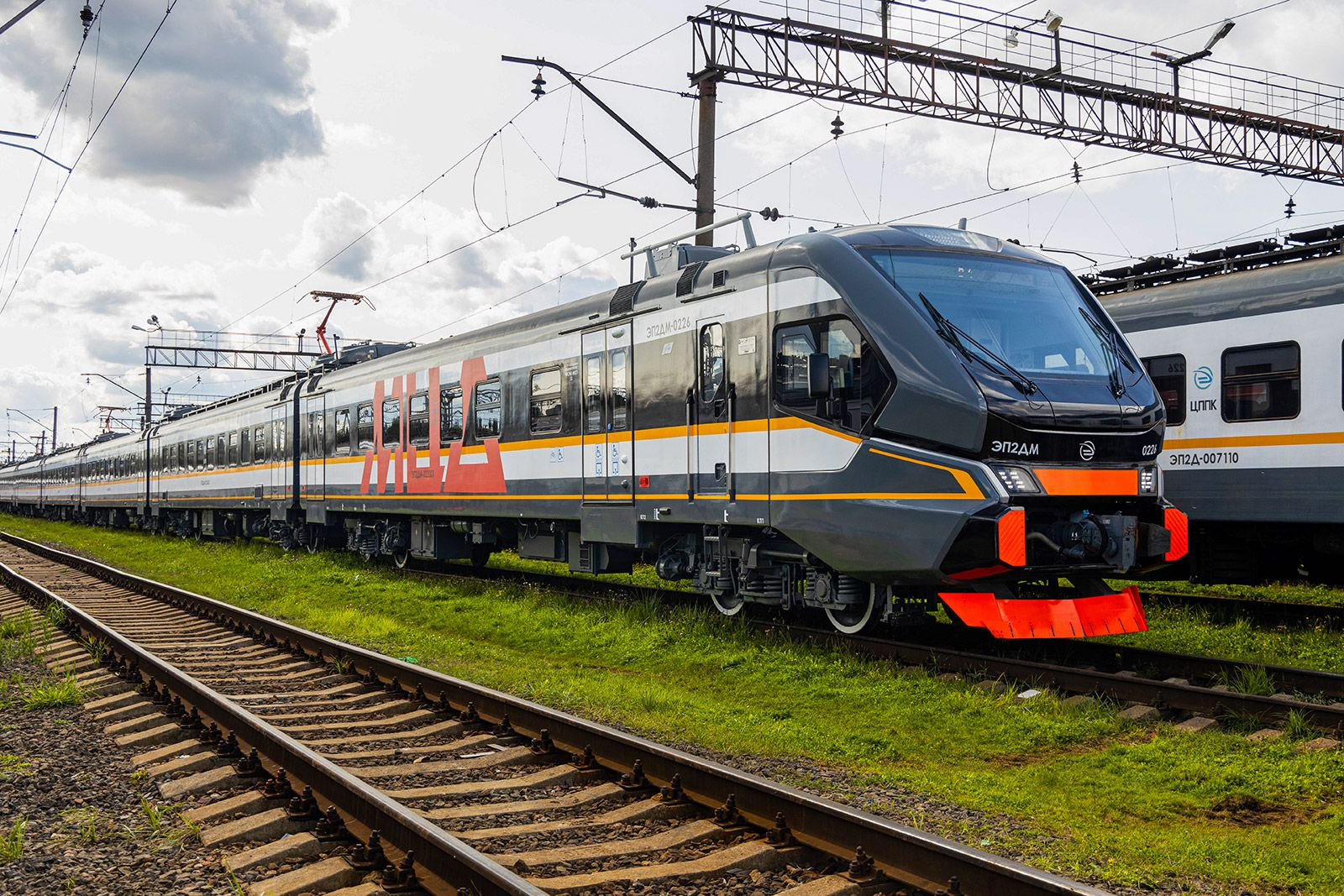
EP2DM (2023)

81-775.2 (2024)

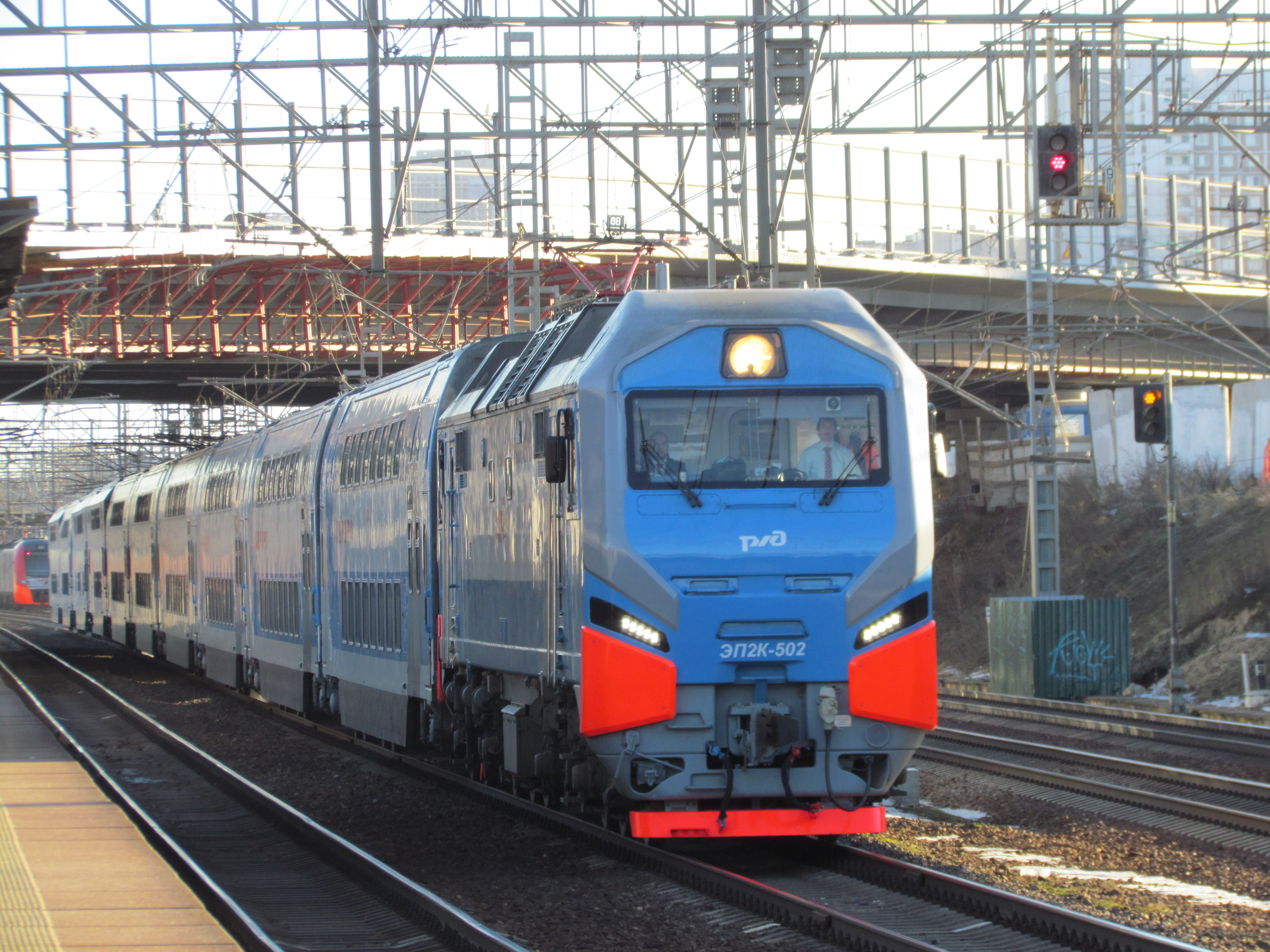
Aurora (2025)

TE26 (2025)

== Structure ==
=== Russia-based companies ===
The company structure includes several major industrial plants in Russia:

- Novocherkassk Electric Locomotive Plant (NEVZ) / Novocherkassk Electric Locomotive Plant / Новочеркасский электровозостроительный завод; is the largest electric locomotive producer in Russia.
- Bryanskiy Machine-building Plant / Bryansk Engineering Plant / Брянский машиностроительный завод; is Russia's largest manufacturer of diesel shunters, also produces freight wagons and marine diesel engines.
- Kolomensky Zavod / Kolomensky Plant / Коломенский завод; produces diesel locomotives and diesel engines and generators.
- Demikhovsky Machine-building Plant / Демиховский машиностроительный завод; major producer of electric multiple units.
- Metrovagonmach / Метровагонмаш; produces urban (metro) electrical multiple units and railcars, also trucks.
- Penzadieselmash / Пензадизельмаш; produces diesel and gas generator sets, located in Penza.
- Bezhitskiy Staleliteiniy Plant / Bezhitsa Steel Foundry / Бежицкий сталелитейный завод; produces steel castings including coupling parts.
- Oktyabrskiy Electrovagonoremontniy Plant / Oktyabrsky Electric Railway Car Repair Plant / Октябрьский электровагоноремонтный завод; performs modernisation, repair and overhaul of passenger rolling stock.
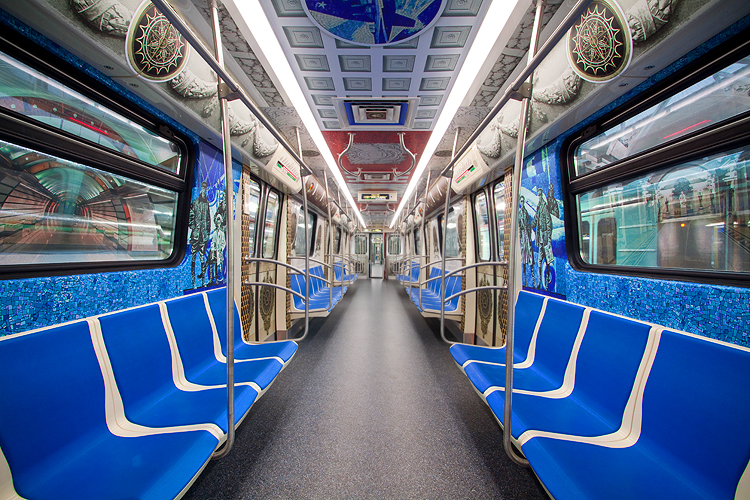
- Interior of Metro 81-722.723.724
  Tsentrosvarmash / Центросвармаш; Russia's largest producer of welded products including bogies, railway vehicle superstructure, bridges and mining equipment.
- Transconverter / Трансконвертер; Joint venture with Siemens AG producing electric supplies for railway vehicles.
- KMT Industrial group / Производственная фирма «КМТ»; designs and manufacturers passenger vehicle equipment.
- Tverskoy Vagonostroitelniy Zavod (TVZ) / Tver Carriage Works / Тверской вагоностроительный завод (25%); develops and produces locomotive hauled passenger vehicles.
- VELNII / Всероссийский научно-исследовательский и проектно-конструкторский институт электровозостроения (ВЭлНИИ); Electric locomotive design company, acquired in 2009.

=== Joint ventures ===
==== Bombardier ====
On 25 May 2007, in Sochi, Russia, Bombardier and Transmasholding signed an agreement to jointly establish an engineering center.

In May 2008, Bombardier and TMH signed an agreement to form a joint company for the production of locomotives. The equal share companies were organised under the previously formed Bombardier Transportation Transmashholding AG, one as an engineering design centre: Transmashholding Bombardier Transportation (Engineering) Rus and another for the manufacturing of inverter drives (based on Bombardier's MITRAC technology) used in electric locomotives: Transmashholding Bombardier Transportation (Industrial) Rus.

==== Knorr-Bremse ====
In April 2007, Transmashholding and Knorr-Bremse agreed to create a Russian joint venture to manufacture, sell and service rail vehicle braking systems in Russia and the Commonwealth of Independent States.

==== Alstom ====
In December 2007, Alstom and Transmasholding signed a cooperation agreement that would lead to the formation of joint ventures for the production of railway components in Russia. In October 2008 the partnership was further extended by the formation of a 51:49 joint venture for the production of double decker coaches TMH-Alstom DV. This intent was ratified on 31 March 2009, with Alstom providing ongoing technical expertise for the modernisation of TMH's production sites, and the development of new locomotive platforms; with TMH undertaking more than 75% of the manufacturing. At the same time Alstom took a 25% stake in TMH's capital holding company.

In April 2013, Alstom and Transmashholding inaugurated a joint production site intended to asynchronous traction motors for electric locomotives in Novocherkassk, that would later be used to equip the locomotives jointly developed and manufactured by Alstom and TMH for Russia and Kazakhstan. The inauguration ceremony was held in the presence of Russian Railways Senior Vice-president Valentin Gapanovich, TMH Managing Director Andrey Andreev, and Alstom Transport President, Henri Poupart-Lafarge.

By late 2015 Alstom had increased its shareholding in Transmashholding by 8% from 25 to 33% for €54 million. In January 2024, Alston sold its shareholding to Russian investors.

==== Siemens ====
Transconverter was formed as a joint venture with Siemens in April 2005 for the production of electrical equipment (high voltage static converters).

==== RVNL ====
In 2022, Transmashholding and Rail Vikas Nigam (RVNL) formed a consortium named Kinet Railway Systems, to participate in a tender by the Government of India to produce sleeper cars for the Vande Bharat Sleeper Express service. The consortium emerged the lowest bidder and was awarded the contract to supply 200 sleeper trainsets to the Indian Railways.

=== Hungary-DJJ ===
Transmashholding acquired the Dunakeszi Jármű Javító (Dunakeszi Vehicle Repair Plant) in 2020 June, from the Hungarian State with joint venture partner Magyar Vagon Zrt. Its first major contract after the change of ownership is the manufacturing of 680 passenger coaches for the Egyptian National Railways (ENR) in cooperation with TMH's Tver Carriage Works. The plant also won a four-year contract in 2020 with the Hungarian State Railways to maintain and modernise 403 coaches.

==== TMH-Argentina ====
The company's subsidiary in Argentina is based in Vicente López, Buenos Aires and serves Argentina as well as other countries in South America. Its activities include the manufacture of several components, including diesel engines, as well as the repair and modernisation of railway infrastructure and rolling stock. It is a joint venture with Trenes Argentinos Infraestructura.

In May 2018, the company took hold of the Mechita workshops in Bragado following a US$3 million investment for the refurbishment of the site. The company was also awarded a contract to refurbish the San Martin Line's carriages and CSR SDD7 locomotives at Mechita and announced plans to invest $70 million over the next 5 years and potentially $170 million over the next 10 in order to produce and repair rolling stock at the plant in exchange for a 30-year concession.

=== Former subsidiaries ===
- Fahrzeugtechnik Dessau (de) was part of Transmashholding from 2006 to 2008 and was taken over by the Romanian CTF at the end of 2008.
