= Máximo Fernández =

Coordinates: 35°04′S 60°43′W

Máximo Fernández (Rail station Juan F. Salaberry) is a hamlet in Bragado county, Buenos Aires, Argentina.

It is the "Cuartel VIII", 25 km away from the city of Bragado, located on the highway between La Limpia and San Emilio. In Máximo Fernández there are 2 public elementary schools.

The name is in honor of Don Maximo Fernandez, who had his ranch there "Estancia La Matilde" (estancia is a term for ranch) and donated part of his land to "Ferrocarril Oeste de Buenos Aires" (Rail station) in 1893 to inaugurate the Juan F. Salaberry station. Later the ranch was purchased by Salaberry-Bercetche, which in 1942 sold it to Don Francisco M. Suárez Zabala who changed the name of the ranch for "Estancia Montelen", that keeps the same name till now.

== Rail station ==
Train station Juan F. Salaberry belongs to the Lincoln-Once long-distance service whereby the company Ferrobaires passes, the train stops if requested by a passenger.

== Population ==
There are 43 inhabitants (INDEC, 2001), representing an increase of 54% compared with 28 inhabitants (INDEC, 1991) the previous census.
