= Andrés Manuel Carretero =

Andrés Manuel Carretero (1927–2004) was an Argentine essayist and self-taught historian. He was born in Bragado and died on July 10, 2004.

== Career ==
Carretero underpinned all of his texts on strict documented works. He worked on various issues including the gaucho, street children, the Federation, daily life during the struggles for independence, tango and colonial society are.

He was a member of the National Academy of Tango where he held the seat of honor "Suerte Loca" and was responsible for its institutional library, supplanting José Gobello.

== Works ==
His work belongs to the Argentine revisionist current which opposed the official history of the country. Some of his works are:

- El gaucho, mito y símbolo tergiversados (El gaucho, distorted myth and symbol) (1964)
- El compadrito y el tango; el hombre de la Argentina comercial (1964)

Dorrego (El hoodlum and the tango, the man in commercial Argentina) (1968)

- Expedición al Nahuel Huapí (Nahuel Huapi Expedition) (1968) (co-authored with Conrado E. Villegas)
- Diario de la expedición al desierto (Journal of the expedition into the wilderness) (1969)
- Colección de obras y documentos relatives a la historia antigua y moderna de las provincias del Río de la Plata (Collection of books and documents relating to the ancient and modern history of the provinces of Rio de la Plata) (1969/1972)
- Los Anchorena; política y negocios en el siglo XIX (Anchorena politics and business in the nineteenth century) (1970)
- El pensamiento político de Juan Manuel de Rosas (The political thinking of Juan Manuel de Rosas) (1970)
- Rosas en los testimonios de su época (Roses in the testimonies of his time) (1970)
- La llegada de Rosas al poder (The arrival of Rosas to power) (1971)
- Anarquía y caudillismo; la crisis institucional en febrero de 1820 (Anarchy and warlordism, the institutional crisis of February 1820) (1971)
- Ida y vuelta de José Hernández (The return of José Hernández) (1972)
- La propiedad de la tierra en la época de Rosas (Land ownership in the days of Rosas) (1972?)
- Conquista de La Pampa (The conquest of La Pampa) (1974) (Co-authored with Manuel Prado Ugarteche)
- Orígenes de la dependencia económica argentina, 1776/1852 (Origins of Argentina's economic dependence 1776/1852)(1974)
- Orden, paz, entrega, 1880-1886 (Order, peace, delivery, 1880-1886) (1974?)
- Correspondencia de Dominguito en la guerra del Paraguay (Correspondence from Dominguito in the war of Paraguay) (1975)
- Liberalismo o dependencia (Liberalism or dependence) (1975)
- La Santa Federación, 1840-1850 (The Holy Federation, 1840-1850) (1975)
- Historia de la conquista del Paraguay, Río de la Plata y el Tucumán (History of the conquest of Paraguay, Rio de la Plata and Tucuman ) (1994)
- Evocaciones Históricas (Historical Evocations)(1994)
- Prostitución en Buenos Aires (Prostitution in Buenos Aires) (1995)
- Chicos de la calle (Street children) (1996)
- Tango, testigo social (Tango, social control) (1996)
- Vida cotidiana en Buenos Aires (Daily life in Buenos Aires) (2000)
- El gaucho argentino. Pasado y presente (The Argentine gaucho. Past and Present ) (2002)
- Tango, la otra historia (Tango, the other story) (2004).
