= Mechita =

- Town
- Location within Buenos Aires Province
- Coordinates: 35°04′09″S 60°24′29″W
- Country: Argentina
- Province: Buenos Aires
- Partidos: Alberti, Bragado
- Established: 1904
- Elevation: 45 m (148 ft)

Population (2001 Census)
  - Total: 1,860
- Time zone: UTC−3 (ART)
- CPA Base: B 6648
- Climate: Dfc

Mechita is a town located in the Bragado Partido in the province of Buenos Aires, Argentina. Part of the town also extends into the Alberti Partido, however the majority of Mechita's residents live within the Bragado Partido. The town is located along National Route 5. Mechita was formerly a major center for the railroad industry, which was the source of the town's founding, however the end of rail service severely hampered this industry, causing a major decline in the town's population.

== Geography ==
Mechita is located 8 km (5.0 mi) from the regional seat of Bragado, and 260 km (160 mi) from the provincial capital of La Plata. Mechita is located along the Salado River.

== History ==
A railway station was built in what would become the town in 1910 by the Buenos Aires Western Railway, run primarily by British investors with the name of the town present, however several buildings had already been constructed in the town as early as 1904. The town was named after the daughter of Argentine president Manuel Quintana, the latter of whom donated 5 km^{2} (1.9 sq mi) of land to found the station in order to resolve a dispute between the railway company and the owners of nearby land parcels. The land purchase was approved in 1906 and the land became the site of around 110 homes and several workshops for the rail industry.

The town peaked in population in the 1950s with the town's economy and sectors of employment largely being centered on the rail industry. By the 1970s, rail service to the town had declined and the population fell rapidly. Further closures occurred in the 1990s. In 2001, the town's abandoned railway station was converted into a museum. The last railway workshops in the town closed in 2011. During the COVID-19 pandemic, health restrictions placed on either side of the town were also imposed on the rest of Mechita, regardless of the partido residents resided in. Because of Mechita's extensive rail history, the Argentine government has recognized the community as a historical site, and the town receives a significant number of tourists as a result of the presence of their historic rail sites.

== Population ==
According to INDEC, which collects population data for the country, the town had a population of 1,860 people as of the 2001 census. 1422 residents resided in the Bragado Partido, while the remaining 438 resided in the Alberti Partido. Around 75% of Mechita's population resides in the Bragado Partido, while the remainder lives in the Alberti Partido. During the peak periods of the rail industry, the town had a population of around 5,000 residents.
