= Bragado Partido =

Bragado Partido de Bragado
- Department
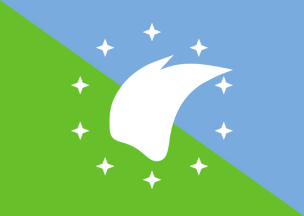
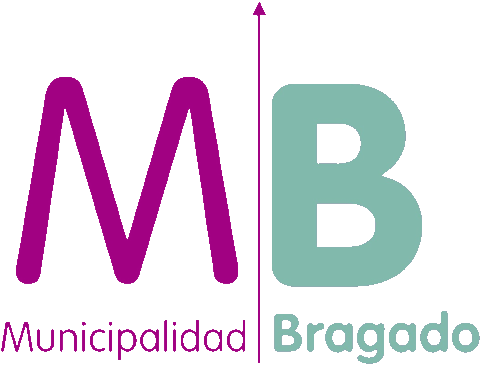
- Flag

- Location of Bragado partido in Buenos Aires Province
- Coordinates: 35°07′S 60°30′W
- Country: Argentina
- Province: Buenos Aires
- Established: March 5, 1865
- Seat: Bragado

Government
  - Intendant: Sergio Barenghi (PJ)

Area
  - Total: 2,230 km^{2} (860 sq mi)

Population
  - Total: 40,259
  - Density: 18.1/km^{2} (46.8/sq mi)
- Demonym: bragadense
- Postal Code: B6640
- IFAM: BUE016
- Area Code: 02342
- Patron saint: Santa Rosa de Lima
- Website: http://www.bragado.gov.ar municipio

Bragado Partido is a partido of Buenos Aires Province in Argentina.

The provincial subdivision has a population of around 40,000 inhabitants in an area of 2,230 km^{2} (860 sq mi), and its capital city is Bragado, which is around 210 km (130 mi) from Buenos Aires.

== Settlements ==
- Bragado
- Asamblea
- Comodoro Py
- General Eduardo O´Brien
- Irala
- La Limpia
- Máximo Fernández,
- Mechita
- Olascoaga
- Warnes

== Attractions ==
- Parque Gral. San Martín
