= Demikhovo Machinebuilding Plant =

Rail vehicle company in Moscow Oblast, Russia

Coordinates: 55°48′6″N 38°53′10″E

Demikhovsky Machinebuilding Plant
- Native name: Демиховский машиностроительный завод
- Type: Open joint-stock company
- Industry: Rail vehicle machine building
- Founded: 1935
- Headquarters: Demikhovo, Moscow Oblast, Russia
- Key people: Oleg Pavlov Director-General, Boris Yurievich Bogatyriov, gen. director
- Products: Electric multiple unit
- Number of employees: 3,604
- Parent: Transmashholding
- Website: www.dmzavod.ru/eng/

Demikhovo Machinebuilding Plant or Demikhovsky Engineering Plant (Russian: Демиховский машиностроительный завод, romanized: Demikhovsky mashinostroitelny zavod, abbreviated DMZ) is a major Russian rail vehicle manufacturer. It is organised as an open joint-stock company.

== History ==
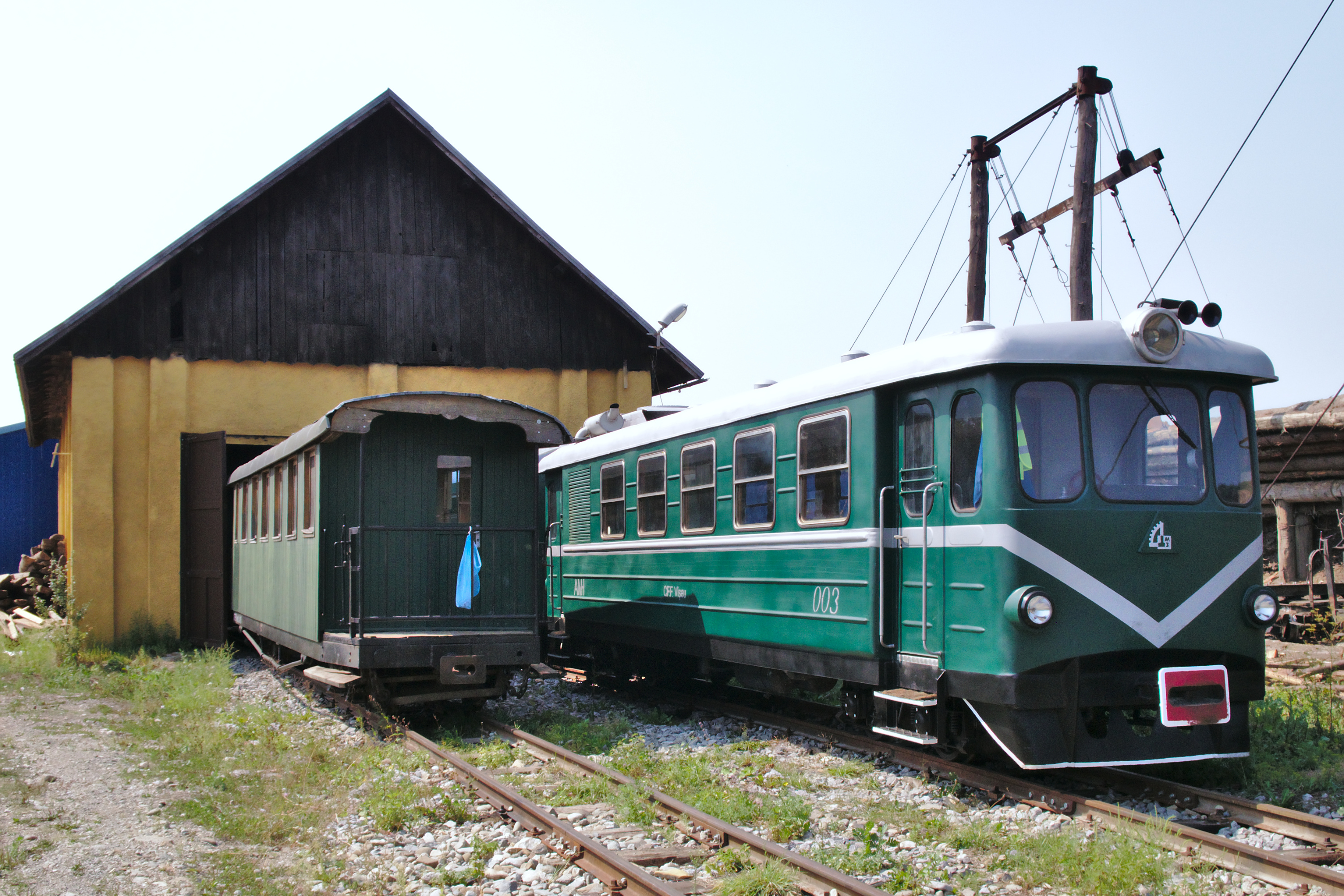
Railcar AM1-003, Mocăniță. «DMZ» builder AM-1: 1962 - 1972.

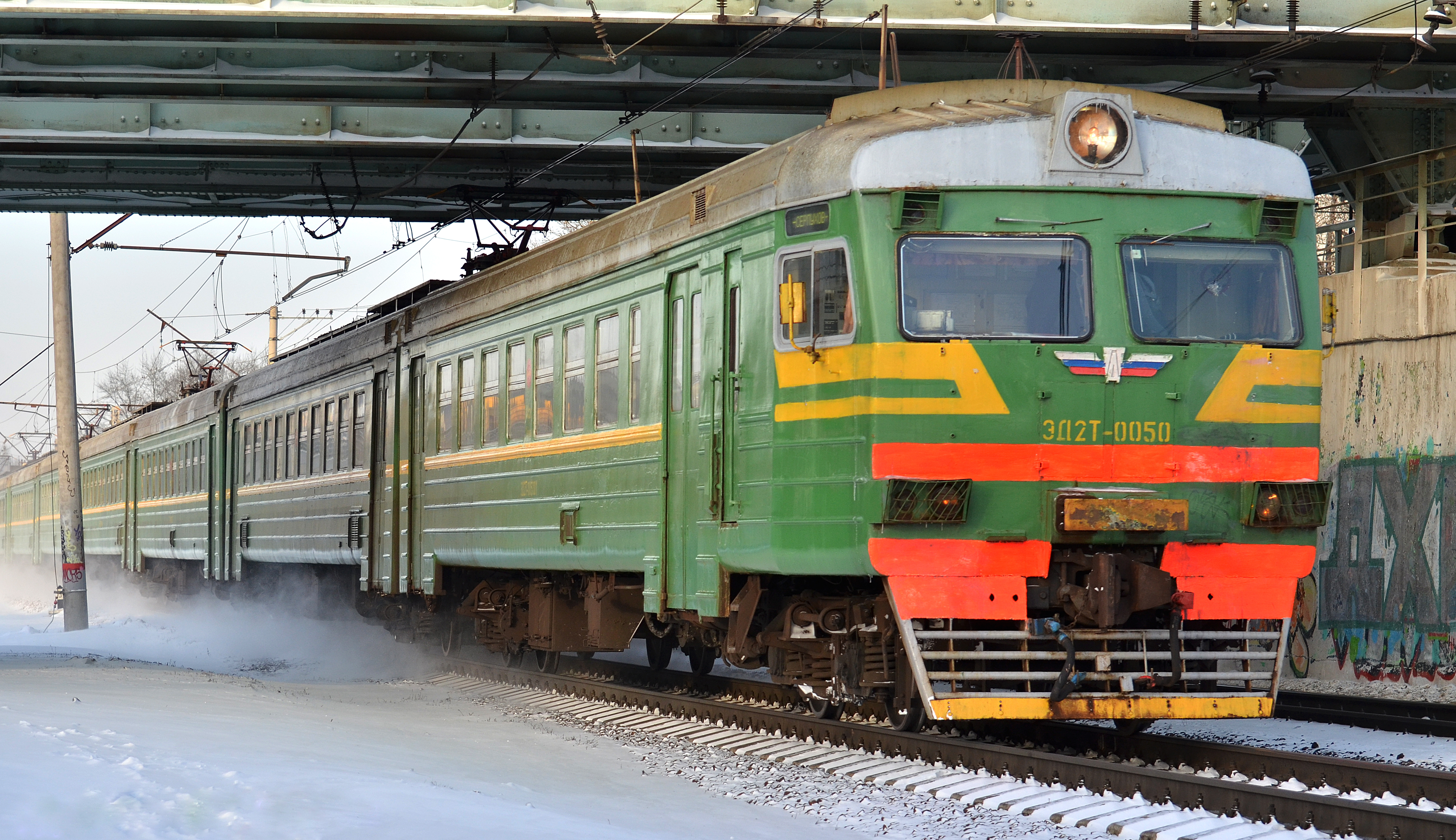
Electric multiple unit ED2T-0050

The site was a silk weaving factory originally owned by the Vetrov family and expropriated by the Soviet government.

Since its inception in May 1935, the profile of Demikhov changed several times. There were activities in chemical engineering and the peat industry. But since 1992, the main products manufactured are electric multiple unit trains on 3000 V DC and 25 kV VAC at 50 Hz. During its life, Demikhov has produced seventeen different types of trains and produced over 3,000 examples, operated in Russia, Ukraine, Belarus and Kazakhstan.

On the occasion of its 50th anniversary in 1985, the factory has been awarded the Order of the Red Banner of Labour.

In 1992, the Russian government decided to expand the production of suburban electric multiple units (EMU) at Demikhovo and substantially expanded the plant. In 1993, the first Russian fully formed EMU saw the light of day.

The company became part of Transmashholding in accordance with the Decree of the Governor of Moscow Region Boris Gromov of 20 July 2001, submitted to the departmental submission to the Committee on Transport, Moscow region.

In 2006 Demikhovsky produced and sold 571 trains of types ED4M, ED9M, and ED4MK). Various spare parts sold for nearly $40 million. In 2006 the company presented its new development, the ED4MKM.

In 2007 Demikhovsky produced and sold 630 electric trains of types ED4M, ED9M, and ED9MK.

In 2008 the electric intermodal passenger transport train ED4MKM-AERO was certified.

== Product line ==
- ED2T Electric (Electric Demikhovsky, version 2): a series of Russian electric direct current, commercially available from 1993 to 1999
- ED9T (Electric Demikhovsky, 9th class): a series of alternating electric trainsets, produced since 1995 until 2000
  - ED9M: the upgraded version of the electric trainsets ED9T, produced since 2000 until 2012
  - ED9E: an upgrade with energy-efficient electrical equipment, produced since 2012 until 2016
- ED4 (Electric Demikhovsky, version 4): a series of Russian electric trainsets, produced since 1996 until 1998
  - ED4M: the upgraded version of the electric trainsets ED4, produced since 1997 until 2016
  - ED4MKU: the upgraded version of the electric trainsets ED4M, produced in 2005
  - ED4MKM: the upgraded version of the electric trainsets ED4MKU, produced since 2006 until 2009
- EP2D: a series of Russian electric trainsets, produced since 2015
  - EP2DM the upgraded version of the electric trainsets EP2D, produced since 2023
- EP3D: a series of alternating electric trainsets, produced since 2016

== Gallery ==
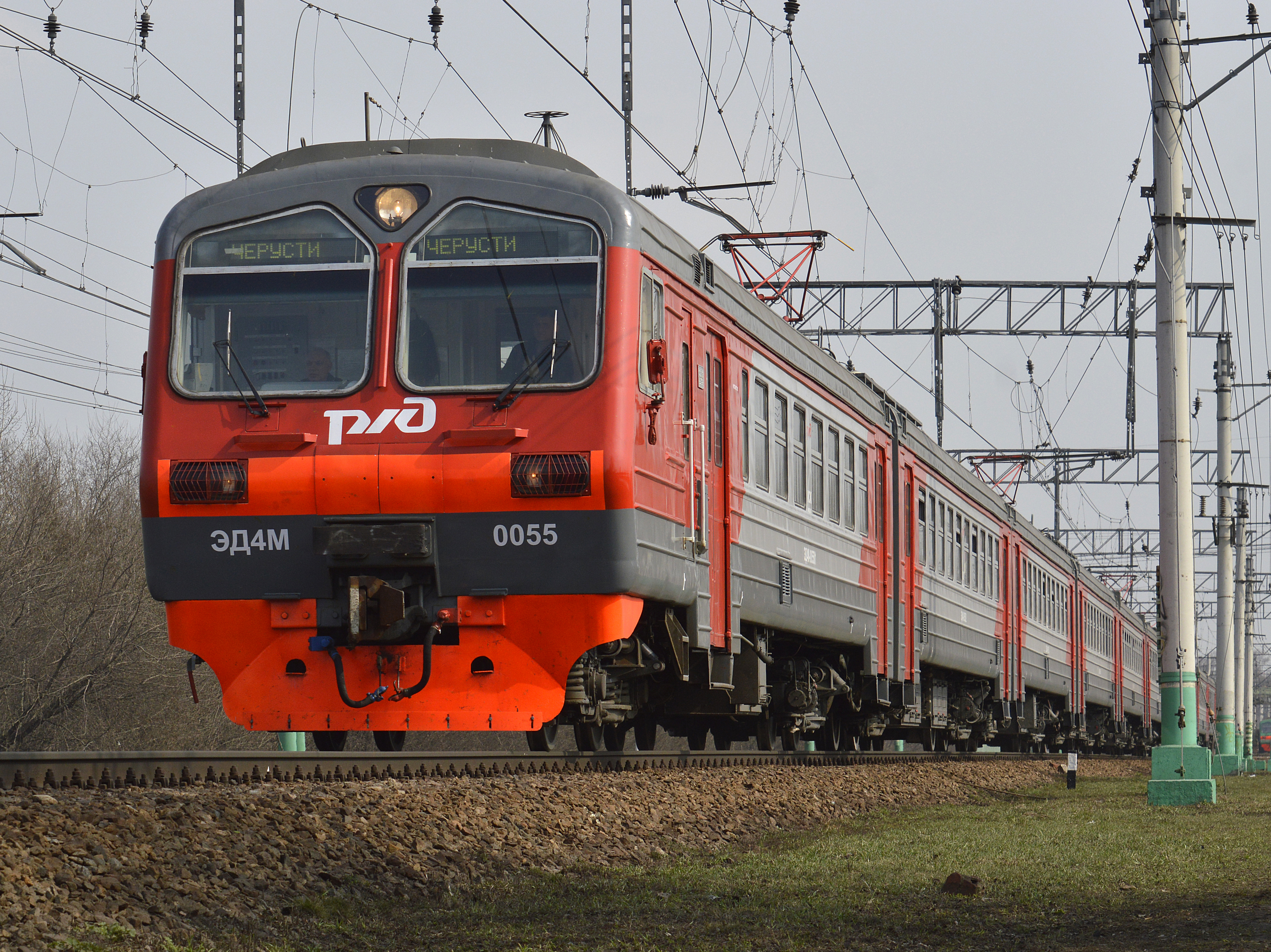
EMU train ED4-0055

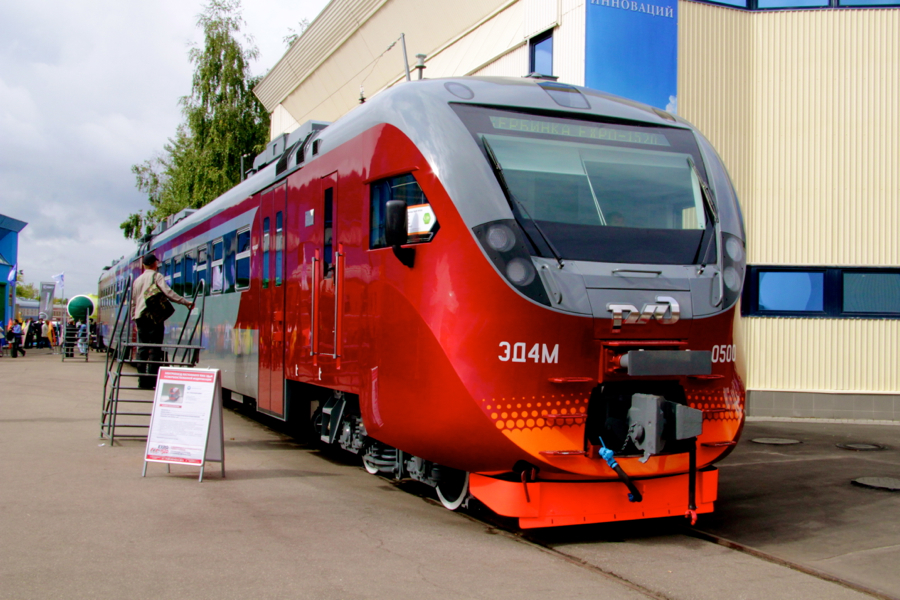
EMU train ED4M-0500

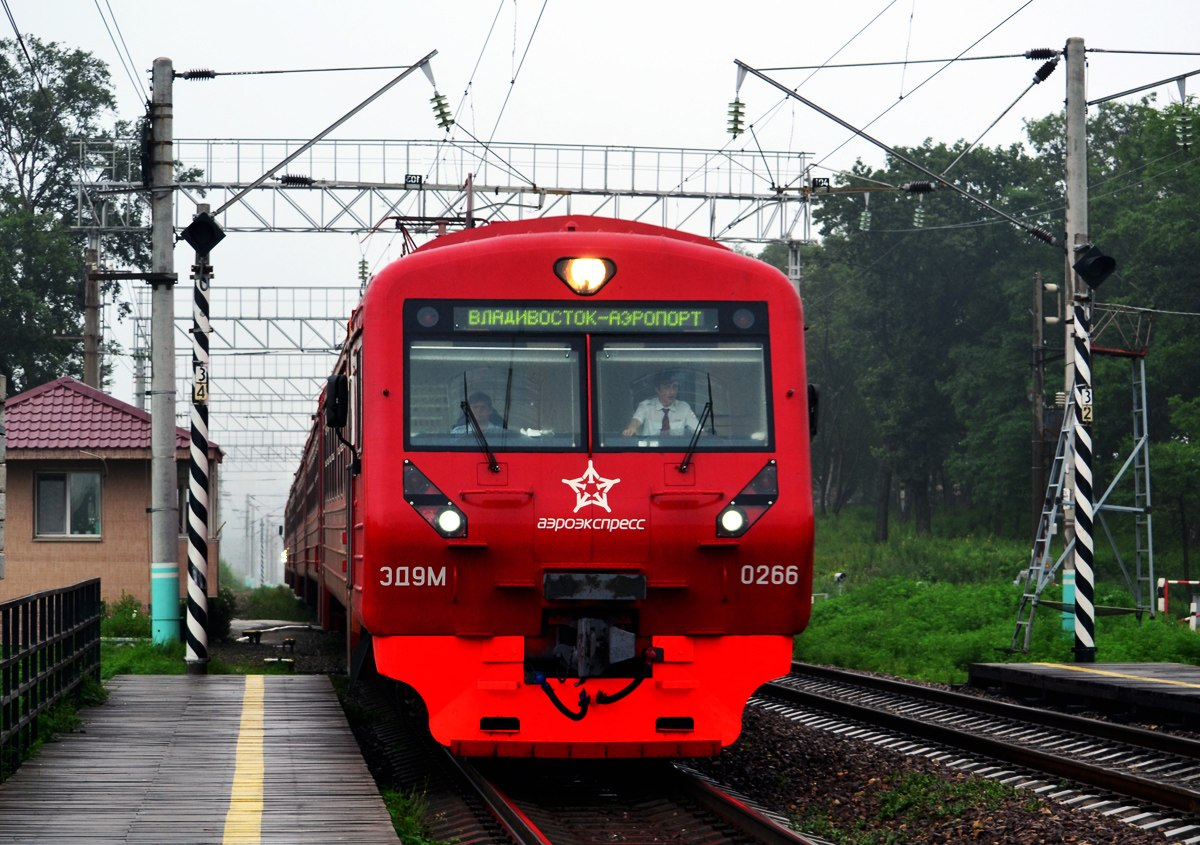
ED9M-0266 Aeroexpress

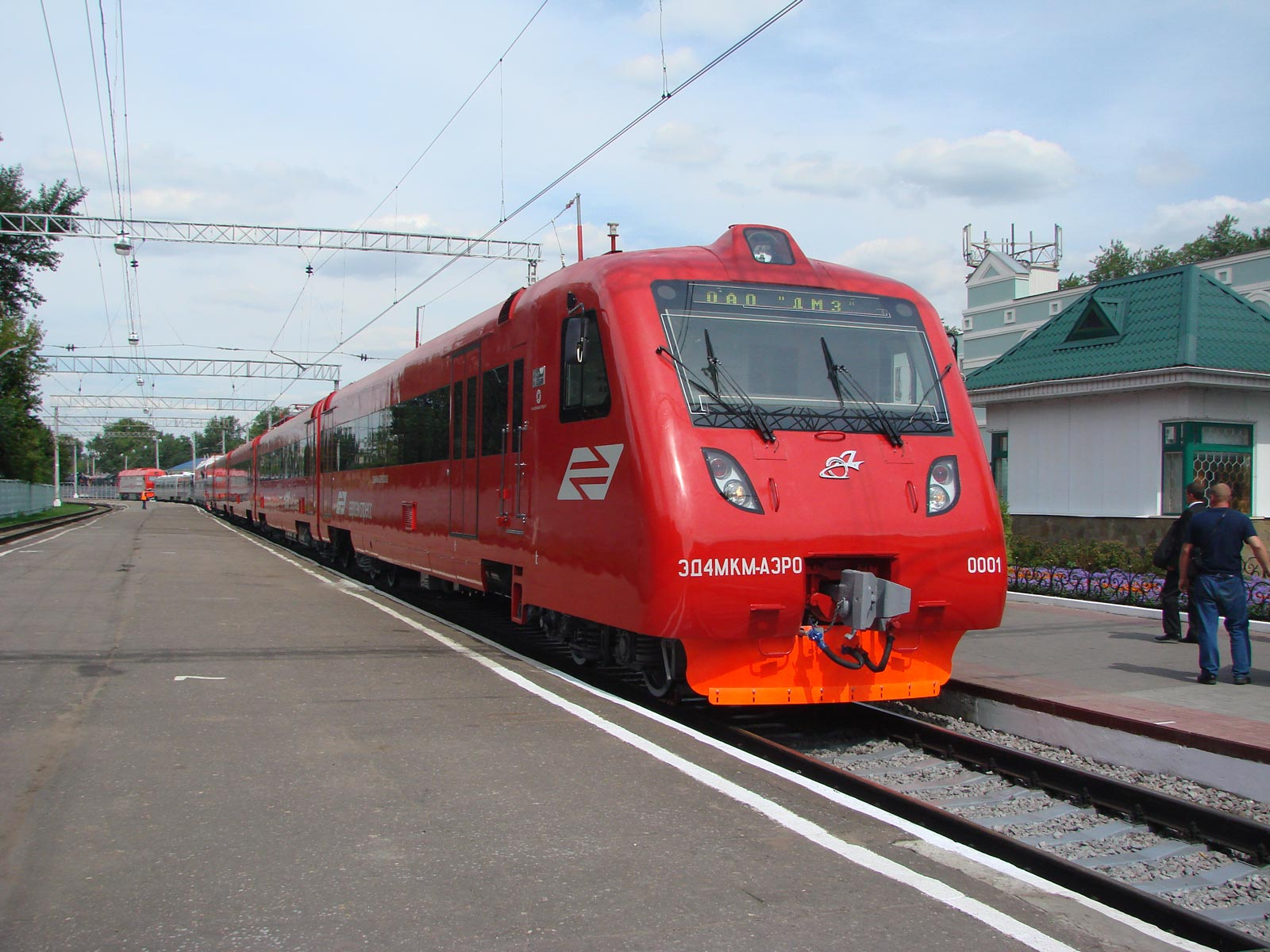
EMU train ED4MKM-AERO

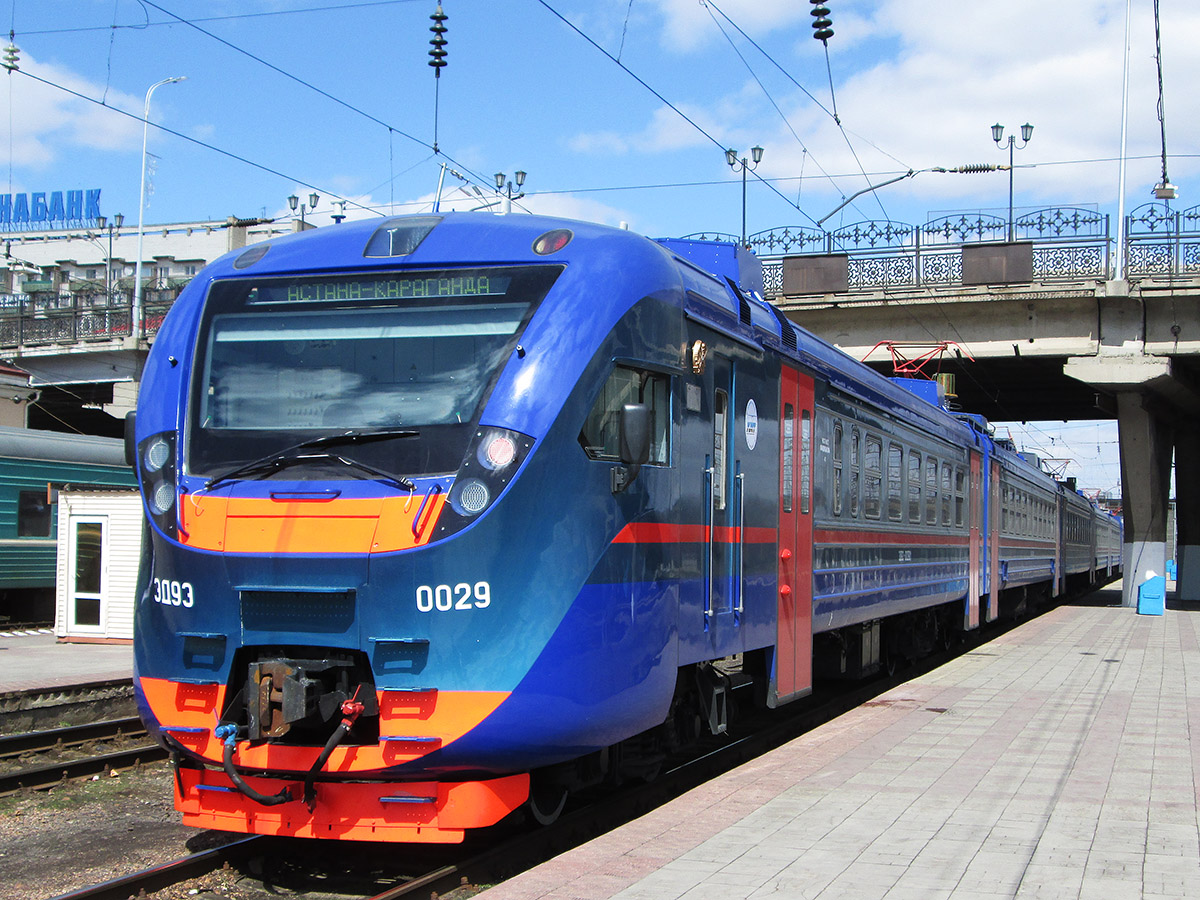
EMU train ED9E-0029

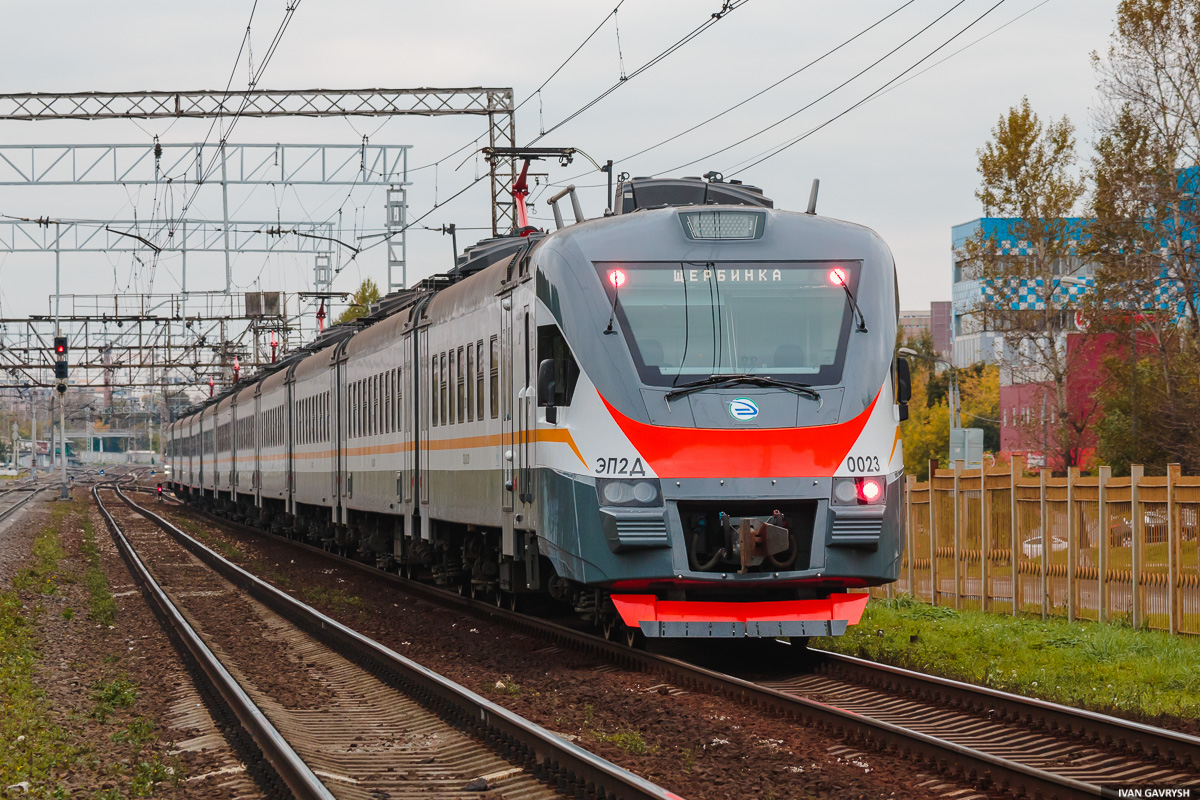
EMU train EP2D

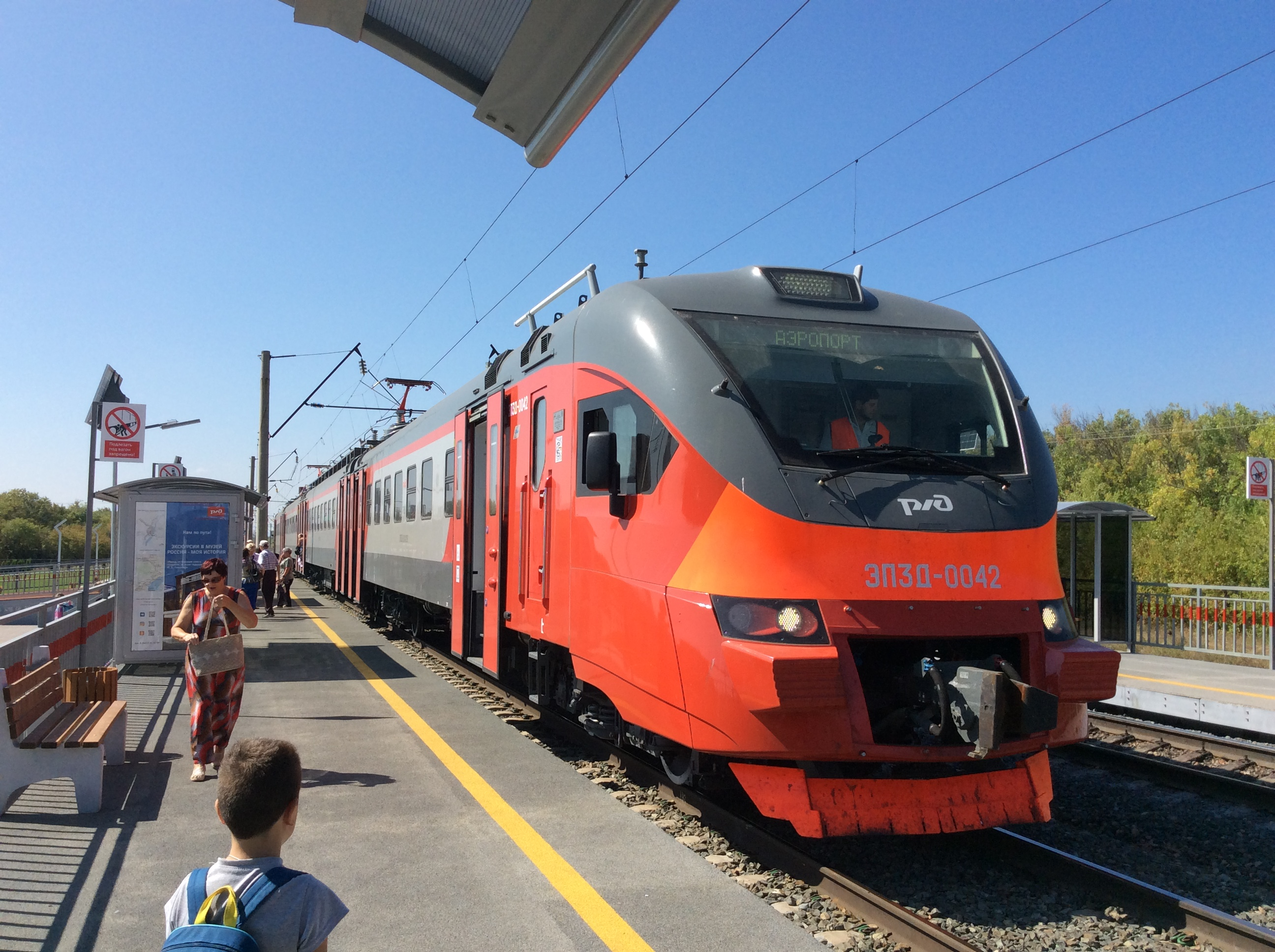
EMU train EP3D

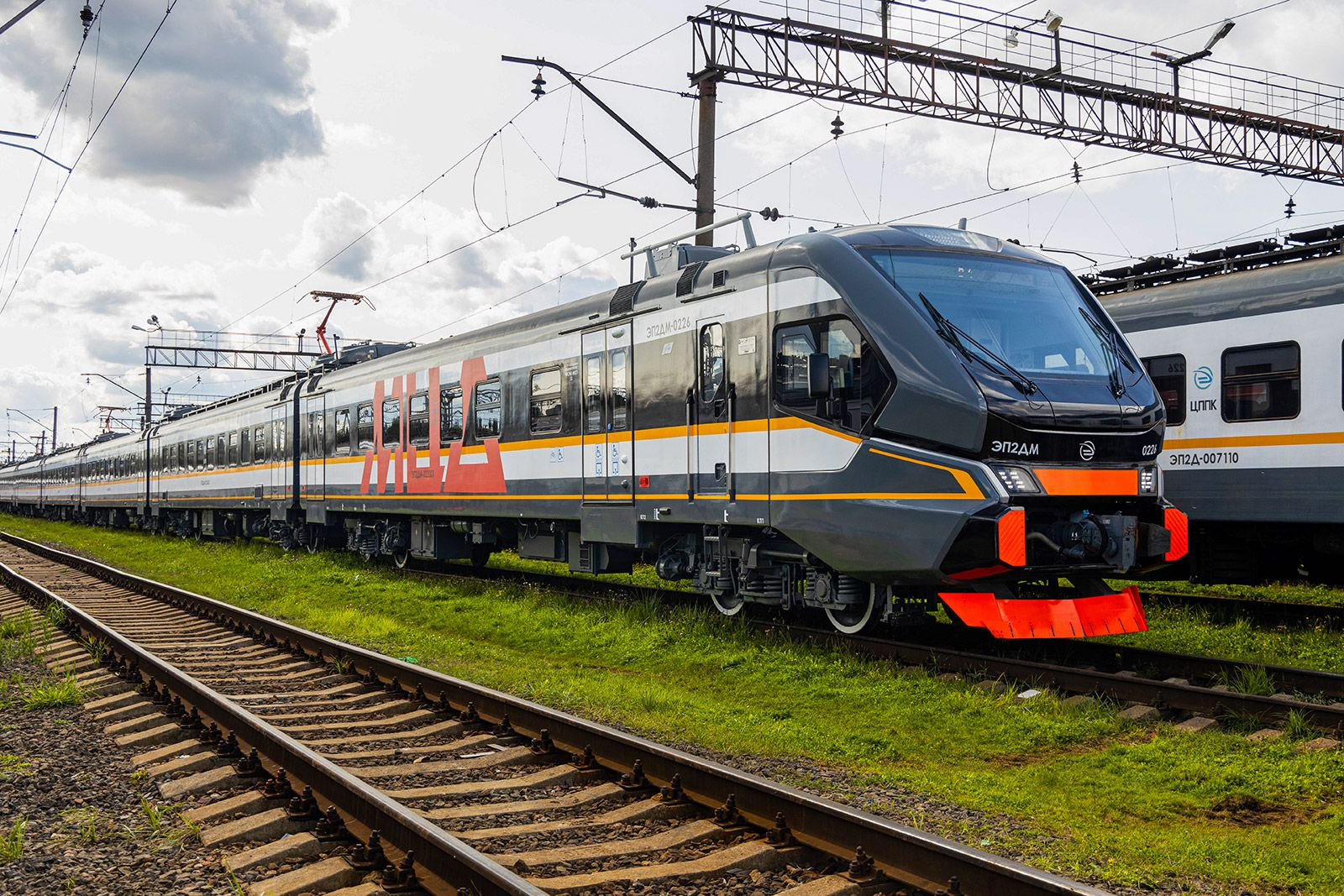
EMU train EP2DM
