= Jorge Basile =

Argentine professional boxing referee

Jorge Basile is an Argentine boxing inspector, boxing judge and former professional boxing referee. He started as a referee in 1994, when Aldo Gustavo Arguello defeated Carlos Ernesto Montañez by a 6-round unanimous decision on May 26 at Club Nolting, Ciudadela, Buenos Aires, and continued working as one until 2016.

Basile is a native of Bragado. On his own account, as of 2015, he had refereed 37 world championship fights and visited such other countries as Colombia, Paraguay, Mexico, The United States and Chile.

The last fight Basile refereed was the bout between Juan Carlos Reveco and Diego Luis Pichardo Liriano, for the vacant IBF Latino Flyweight title on December 2, 2016, at Malargue, Mendoza, Argentina. Reveco won the regional title by outpointing Pichardo Liriano over ten rounds by unanimous decision, after dropping him in round six. The last world championship fight he refereed had taken place on the previous November 19, when Erica Anabella Farias retained her WBC female world Super-Lightweight championship with a ten-rounds unanimous decision over Marisa Gabriela Nuñez, in San Fernando, Buenos Aires province, also in Argentina.

== Inspector ==
Since Basile retired as a referee, he has performed, beginning in 2017, as an inspector for the FAB.

== Judging ==
As a judge, Basile has scored more than 200 professional boxing contests.
