= Alberti, Buenos Aires =

Alberti
- Location in Argentina Alberti (Argentina)
- Coordinates: 35°01′S 60°16′W
- Country: Argentina
- Province: Buenos Aires
- Partido: Alberti
- Founded: 12 October 1886
- Elevation: 38 m (125 ft)

Population (2010 census [INDEC])
  - Total: 8,260
- CPA Base: B 6634
- Area code: +54 2346
- Climate: Cfa

Alberti is a town in Buenos Aires Province, Argentina. It is the administrative centre for Alberti Partido. It is the birthplace of Canadian stage actor Juan Chioran, who lived in Alberti until 1975 at age 12.

== Geography ==
The village is located about 197.1 km west of Buenos Aires, the Argentine capital and largest city. The climate is temperate and humid, with the common characteristics of the Buenos Aires pampas.

== Population ==
The town of Alberti has 8,290 inhabitants as of the 2010 census, representing an increase of 10.2% compared to 7,493 inhabitants as of the 2001 census.

== History ==
In 1848 Andres Vaccarezza arrived from Genoa, Italy, acquired a field in Party Headquarters VI Chivilcoy counted 37 hectares and later expanded to 500 hectares. Later in his field creates an agricultural and industrial colony, establishing the most important one in the area at that time and led the settlement of the first flour mill. By 1872 the house at the corner of the founder of the current Av. Vaccarezza and Belgrano street is built.

From 1877 the Chivilcoy-Bragado West Railway Station Alberti creating the branch, which gives a strong impetus to the development of the village opens. The city was founded by Alberti Andrés Vaccarezza the October 27, 1877, the forefront of the urban plant, consisting of 80 blocks located around the railroad ferrocarril. In 1885 Don Andres Vaccarezza hires surveyor Vicente Souza having previously developed to perform the final layout of the town. The extent of the founder of the field was split into 166 blocks 100 meters wide, separated by streets 20 meters wide; each block was subdivided in 4 plots, which threw a total of 664 lots.

After persistent efforts with the Government of the province of Buenos Aires, on June 6, 1910 it is approved the bill creating the Party of Alberti. On June 10 of that year Governor Jose Inocencio Arias enacts the Act, creating the Party of Alberti hitherto land belonging to the Parties Chivilcoy, Bragado, May 25, and Chacabuco.

== See also ==
- Salado River
