= Alberti Partido =

Alberti Partido de Alberti
- Department
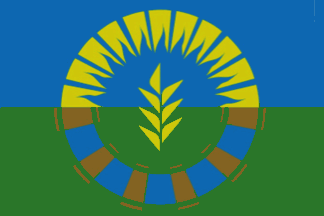
- Flag

- Country: Argentina
- Province: Buenos Aires
- Established: June 10, 1910
- Founder: Andres Vaccarezza
- Seat: Alberti

Government
  - Intendant: Jorge Gaute (PJ)

Area
  - Total: 1,130 km^{2} (440 sq mi)

Population
  - Total: 10,322
  - Density: 9.13/km^{2} (23.7/sq mi)
- Demonym: albertino
- Postal Code: B6634
- IFAM: BUE003
- Area Code: 02346
- Website: www.alberti.gov.ar

Alberti is a northern central partido of Buenos Aires Province, Argentina.

Alberti is located at the south of the Gran Buenos Aires urban area. It has an area of 1,130 km^{2} (436 sq mi) and 10,322 inhabitants (2001 census [INDEC]).

== Economy ==
The economy of Alberti is dominated by agriculture. Its main products are wheat, maize, soya beans, oats, sunflowers, sorghum, and industrial crops.

== Attractions ==
- Raúl Lozza Gallery of Contemporary Art, Alberti
- Parque Municipal (Municipal park), Alberti

== Settlements ==
- Alberti (Capital) (7,493 inhabitants)
- Achupallas (112 inhabitants)
- Anderson
- Baudrix
- Villa Ortíz, Estación Coronel Mom (857 inhabitants)
- Coronel Seguí (148 inhabitants)
- Gobernador Ugarte
- Mechita (438 inhabitants)
- Larrea
- Emita
- Palantelén
- Plá (237 inhabitants)
- Presidente Quintana
- Villa Grisolía
- Villa María (21 inhabitants)
