= Bergen Engines case =

2021 Norwegian political controversy

The Bergen Engines case was a Norwegian political controversy in 2021 concerning the planned sale of the engine manufacturer Bergen Engines from Rolls-Royce Holdings to the Russian-owned company TMH International. The proposed transaction triggered political debate in Norway and assessments of potential national security implications. The Norwegian government blocked the sale on 26 March 2021 under provisions of the Norwegian Security Act.

== Background ==
Bergen Engines is a manufacturer and supplier of medium-speed diesel and gas engines as well as generator sets for both civilian and military use in Norway and several allied countries. The company operates a manufacturing facility at Hordvikneset in Bergen.

Engines from Bergen Engines have been delivered to vessels operated by the Norwegian Coast Guard, the intelligence ship FS Marjata and ships from allied countries.

The company was owned by Rolls-Royce Holdings, which in 2020 decided to sell the business as part of a restructuring of the group.

== Course of events ==
On 15 December 2020 Rolls-Royce notified Norwegian authorities that the company planned to sell the Norwegian registered firm Bergen Engines. The notification was sent to the Ministry of Foreign Affairs, which forwarded the information the following day to the Ministry of Justice and Public Security and the Ministry of Trade, Industry and Fisheries, as well as to the Norwegian Police Security Service and the Norwegian Intelligence Service.

In January 2021 several ministries and security agencies began assessing potential national security implications of a sale. After an external alert to the Ministry of Trade, Industry and Fisheries on 11 January, the matter was discussed among senior civil servants in the Ministry of Justice and Public Security, the Ministry of Trade, Industry and Fisheries and the Ministry of Defence. At the same time, the Norwegian Police Security Service and the Norwegian Intelligence Service were tasked with preparing assessments of possible security risks related to the transaction.

On 4 February 2021 Rolls-Royce announced that an agreement had been reached to sell Bergen Engines to TMH International, a Swiss-registered company affiliated with the Russian industrial group Transmashholding.

In February and March 2021 the Norwegian newspapers Bergens Tidende and E24 published a series of investigative articles about the planned sale, including reports on the ownership structure of the company and links to the industrial group and Russian oligarchs. The reporting also described plans for cooperation between Transmashholding and the Russian state-owned shipbuilder United Shipbuilding Corporation on the development of marine engines.

After the sale agreement became known, Norwegian authorities began reviewing the transaction under the provisions of the Security Act. On 9 March 2021 the Norwegian National Security Authority stated that Rolls-Royce had been notified that the government was considering stopping the sale. Rolls-Royce announced that the transaction had been paused pending the authorities’ investigation.

The Norwegian Defence Logistics Organisation and Norwegian Defence Materiel Agency stated that they were assessing how a change of ownership might affect existing contracts and future deliveries.

On 23 March, Minister of Justice and Public Security Monica Mæland presented a statement on the matter to the Storting (the Norwegian parliament). On 26 March the government formally decided to stop the sale of Bergen Engines to TMH International. The decision was made through a royal resolution adopted in the King in Council, based on section 2-5 of the Security Act. The decision prohibited the transfer of shares, assets, technology and information related to the transaction.

The case was later discussed in the Storting following statements from the government. The Standing Committee on Scrutiny and Constitutional Affairs also held a hearing in 2021 on the government’s handling of the matter.

After the sale to TMH International was blocked, Rolls-Royce continued the process of finding a new buyer for the business. In December 2021 it was announced that Bergen Engines would instead be sold to the British industrial group Langley Holdings.

== Reactions ==
The proposed sale prompted reactions from several political parties in the Storting. Representatives from the Centre Party, the Labour Party and the Socialist Left Party requested that the government present a statement to parliament about the matter.

Several opposition parties also argued that the sale should be stopped. Representatives from the Centre Party, Red Party, the Green Party and the Progress Party stated that the government should intervene on grounds of national security.

Representatives from the Progress Party and the Red Party also stated that the issue could lead to a motion of no confidence against the Minister of Defence if the government did not intervene.

The Christian Democratic Party stated that it had confidence that the government would make the necessary assessments under the Security Act.
