= ARA Py =

At least three ships of the Argentine Navy have been named Py or Comodoro Py:

- ARA Py (M-7), a minesweeper previously the German Margot and renamed on transfer in 1922. She was decommissioned in 1937.
- ARA Py (M-10), a Bouchard-class minesweeper commissioned in 1939 and transferred to Paraguay as Teniente Fariña in 1968.
- ARA Py (D-27), a Gearing-class destroyer launched in 1944 as USS Perkins and renamed on transfer in 1973. She was expended as a target in 1987.
