= JSC Transmash =

Transmash
- Native name: Трансмаш
- Type: Joint stock
- Industry: Rail rolling stock
- Predecessor: Engels transport machine manufacturing factory
- Founded: 1893
- Headquarters: Engels, Saratov Oblast, Russia
- Key people: Evgenyi Shlychkov president of company
- Revenue: $84.3 million (2017)
- Operating income: $2.01 million (2017)
- Net income: $1.55 million (2017)
- Total assets: $43.4 million (2017)
- Total equity: $24.1 million (2017)
- Owner: Integrirovannaya Vagonostroitelnaya Kompaniya (100%)
- Number of employees: ~1000
- Website: www.transmash.com

JSC (Joint Stock Company) Transmash is a Russian rail industry company specialising in rolling stock, track laying equipment, and railway snow ploughs.

Transmash is owned by Integrirovannaya Vagonostroitelnaya Kompaniya (part of the Transmashholding group); the Slovak Tatravagonka company owns a 50% stake in the plant.

== History ==
The company was founded in 1898 as Engels transport machine manufacturing factory., in 1956 the factory started the production of snowploughs; both self-propelled and non-self-propelled. In 1996 the factory became a joint stock company and started the production of railway track maintenance equipment rolling stock, such as wagons for switches and ballast. In 2004 the company started production of wagons for container transportation.

Transmash specializes in domestic brake production, mainly in brake equipment for types of freight and passenger carriages, locomotives, motor coach rolling stock, high-speed and extra high-speed trains and rolling stock for underground railways.

== Areas of business ==
The company manufactures specialised rolling stock for snow removal on railways, and other wagons for container, ballast and switches as well as carrying out overhauls on rolling stock.

== Gallery ==
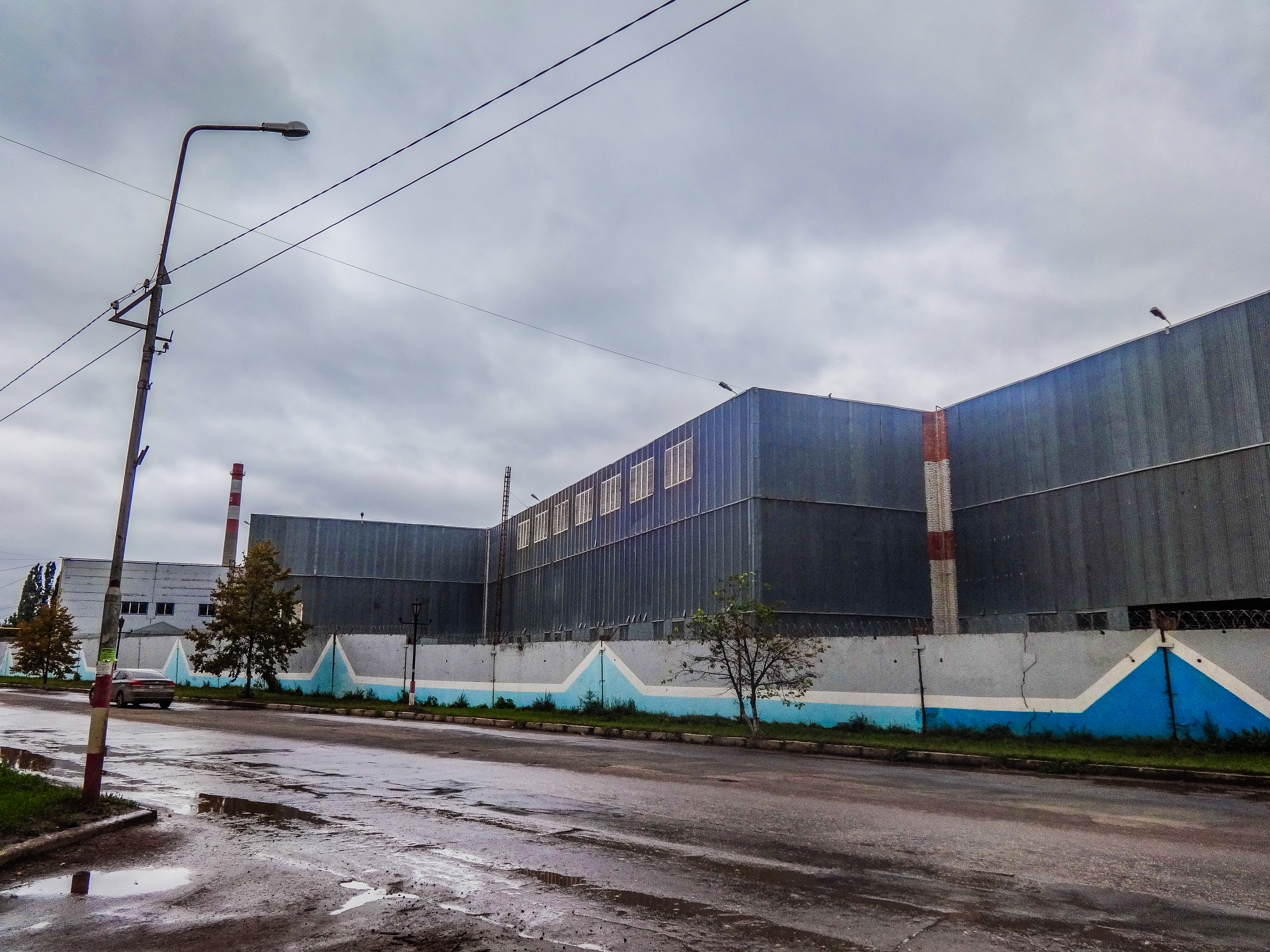
The building where the railway workshops used to be located

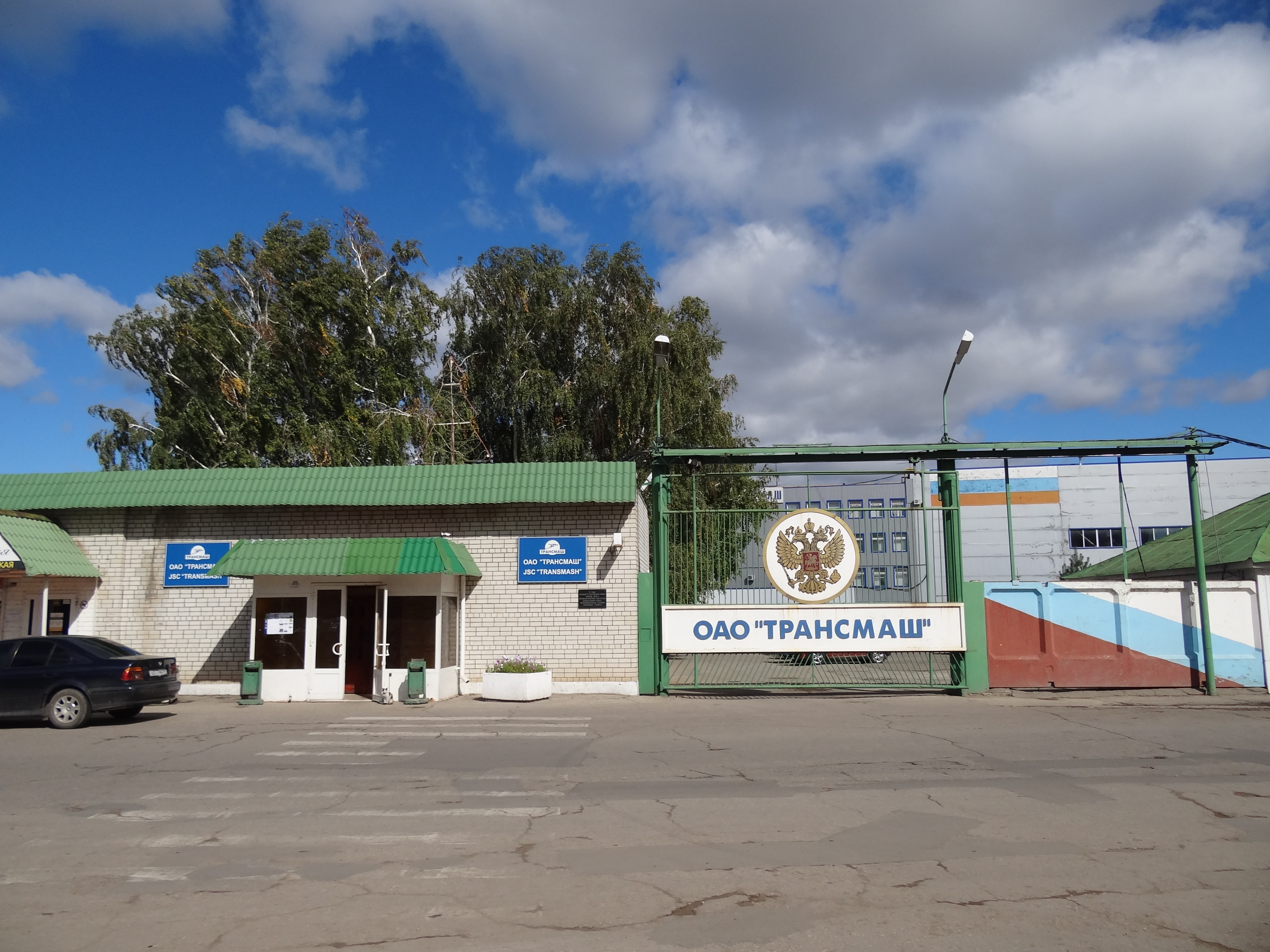
Gates of Transmash
