= Bragado =

City in Buenos Aires Province, Argentina

- City
- Location of Bragado in Argentina
- Coordinates: 35°07′S 60°30′W
- Country: Argentina
- Province: (Buenos Aires Province) Buenos Aires
- Partido: Bragado
- Founded by = Colonel Eugenio del Busto: 1857
- Elevation: 50 m (160 ft)

Population (2010 census)
  - Total: 33,222
- CPA Base: B 6640
- Area code: +54 2342
- Climate: Cfa

Bragado is a city in the center-northwest province of Buenos Aires, Argentina, and the head town of Bragado Partido. The city is 210 km west-southwest from Buenos Aires City, not far from the Salado River. Bragado is served by the Sarmiento Railway with services running from the train station there to Once railway station in Buenos Aires.

== Etymology and legend ==
The name of the city came from an old 18th century legend. At that time, there was a brave horse, incredibly beautiful and defiant, who went to the lagoon to drink water.

The natives and the soldiers of the Argentine Army wanted to tame the horse. There were many attempts to catch it, but the horse was brave and it was always fighting, defending its freedom. One day, a group of soldiers cornered it against the lagoon, in a ravine, and when they were sure that it had no escape, the horse jumped to the water, killing itself. It preferred death to captivity.

The libertarian spirit of the horse was so amazing that the legend of the Bragado horse spread around the place and gave name to the city.

== Notable people ==
- Jorge Basile, international boxing referee
- Andrés Manuel Carretero, writer

== Gallery ==
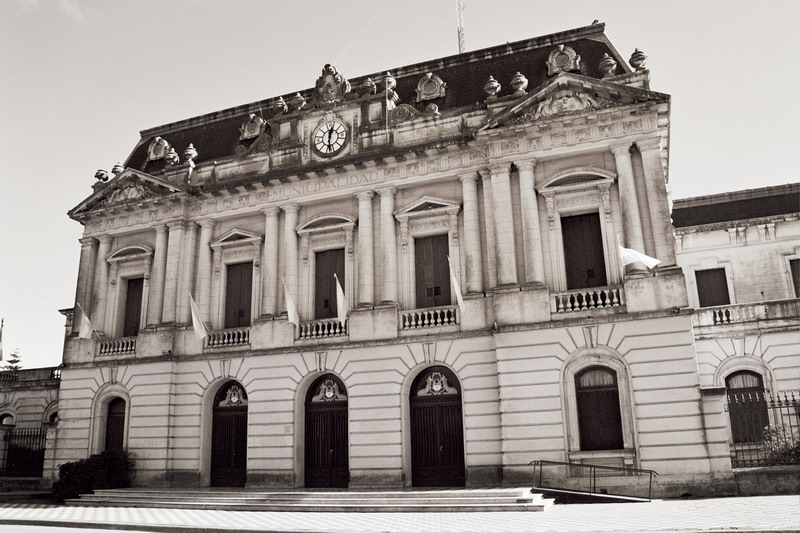
Bragado City Hall

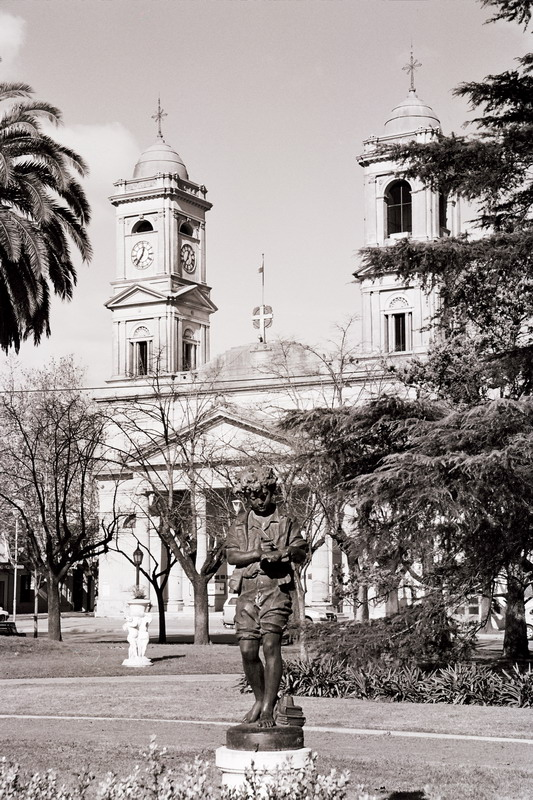
Santa Rosa de Lima Parish, Bragado

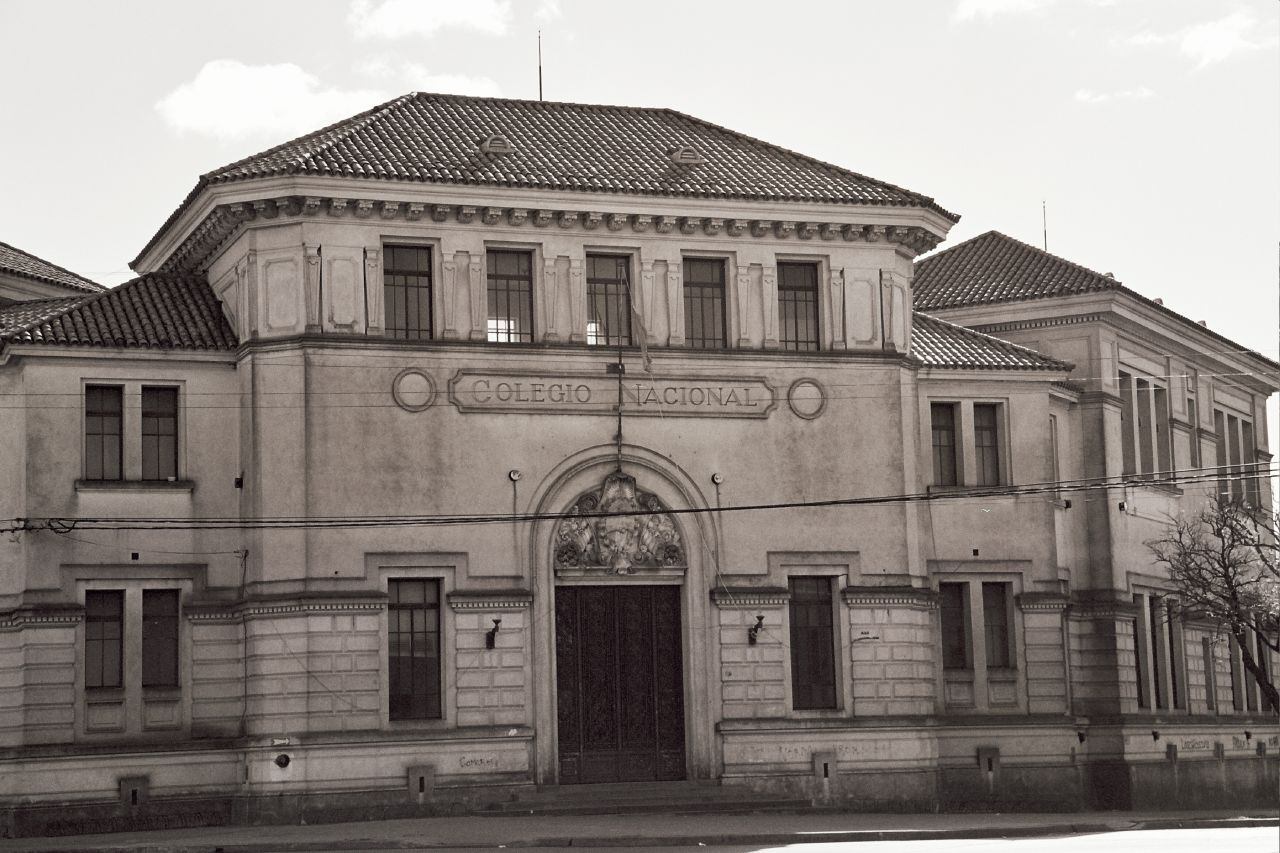
Bragado - Colegio Nacional

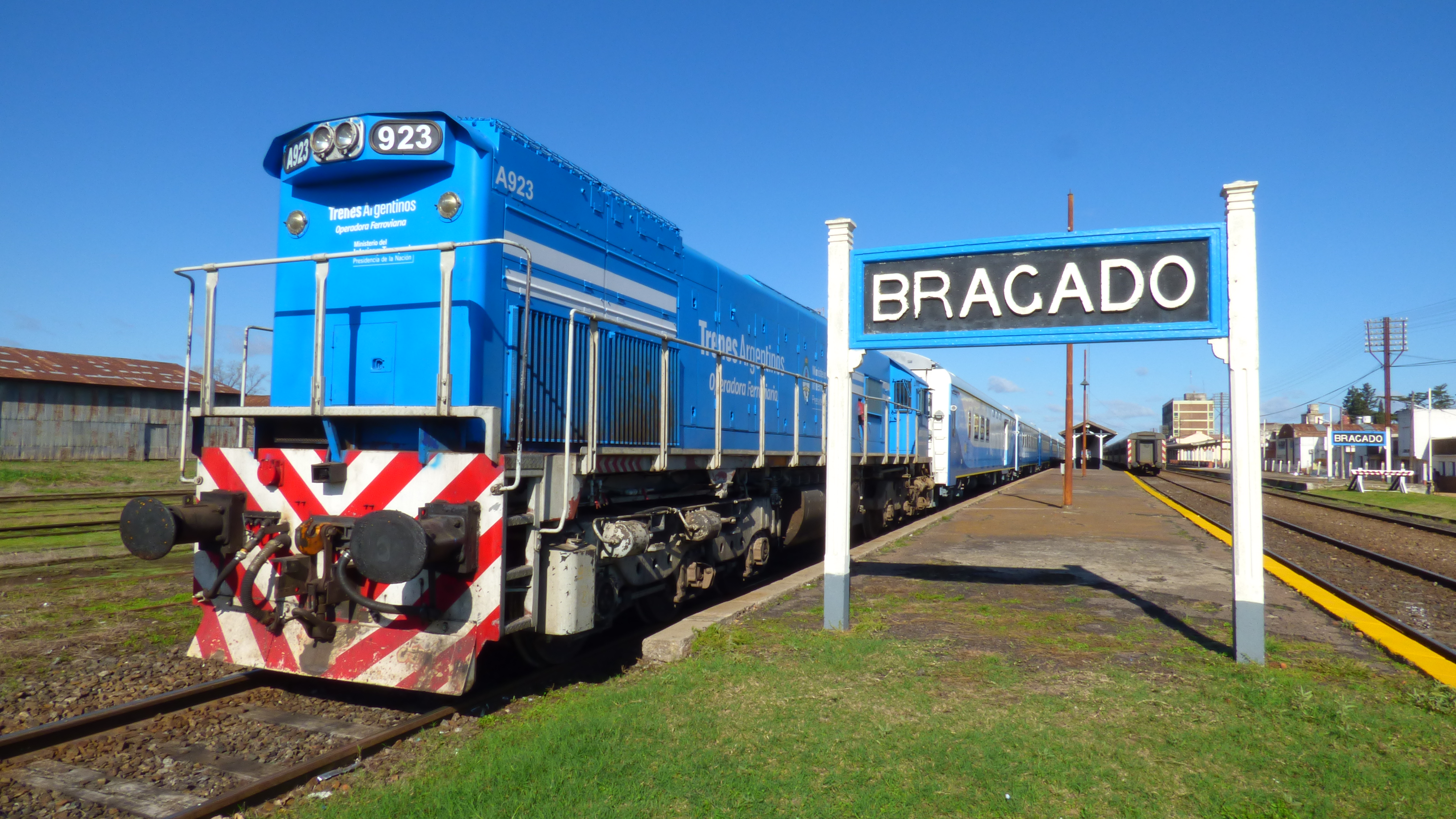
Bragado train station
