= Rail transport in Ukraine =

Rail network in Ukraine
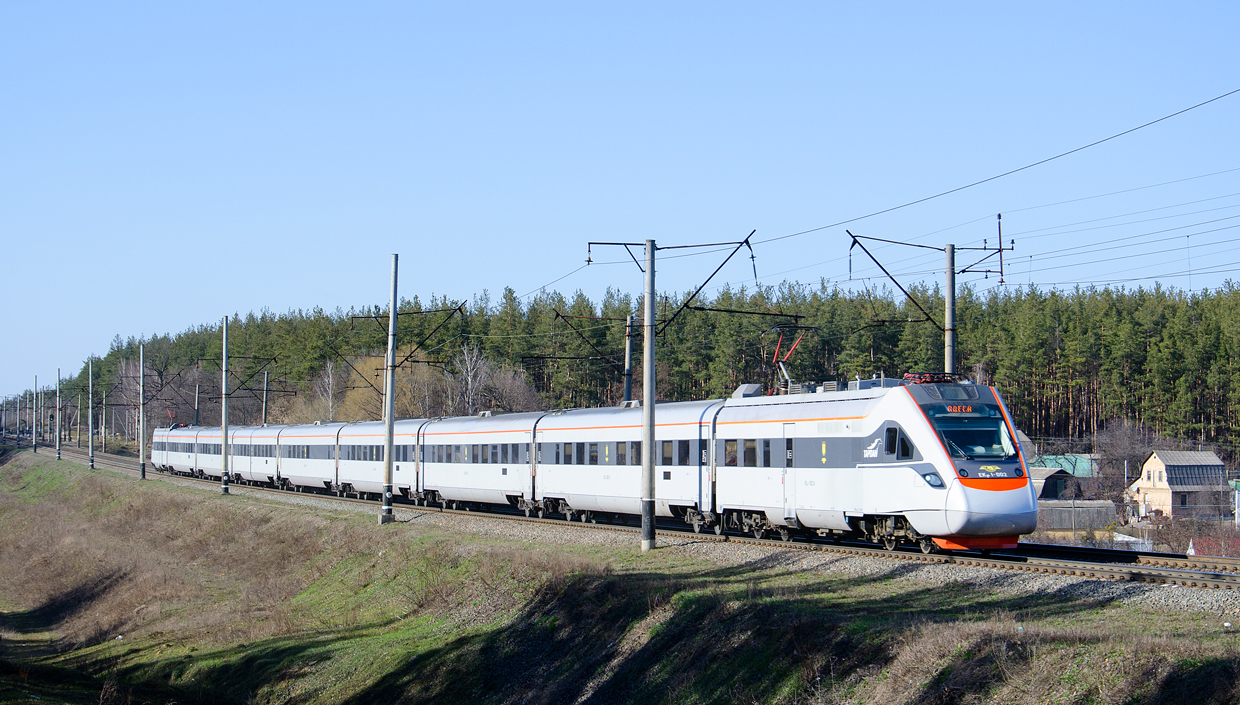
- An EKr1 between Boyarka and Vasylkiv in Kyiv Oblast

Operation
- National railway: Ukrzaliznytsia (UZ) (Ukrainian Railways)

Statistics
- Ridership: 53.7 million (2014, Ukrzaliznytsia only)
- Freight: 443.222 megatonnes (436,222,000 long tons; 488,569,000 short tons) (2013, Ukrzaliznytsia only)

System length
- Total: 21,640.4 kilometres (13,446.7 mi)
- Electrified: 9,878 kilometres (6,138 mi)

Track gauge
- Main: 1,520 mm (4 ft 11 27/32 in)

Features
- No. of stations: 1,447
Map
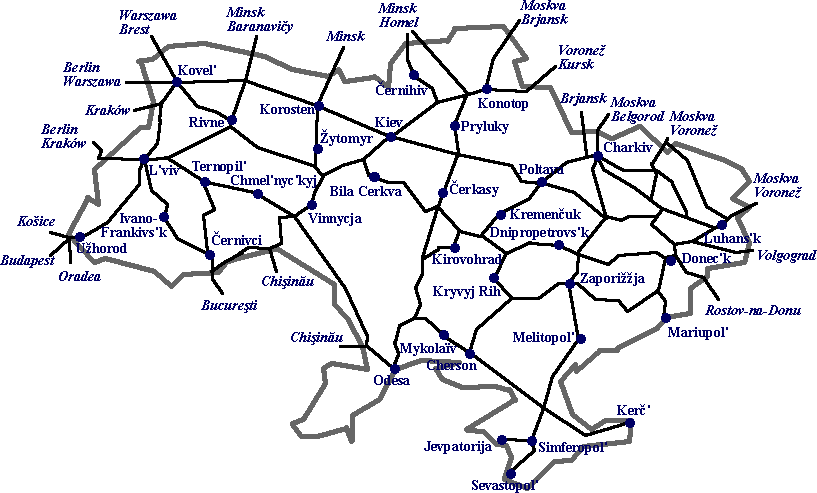

Rail transport is a major transport mode in Ukraine. Most railway infrastructure in Ukraine is owned by the government of Ukraine through Ukrzaliznytsia (Public JSC 'Ukrainian Railways'), a joint-stock company which has a de facto country-wide monopoly on passenger and freight transport by rail.

The first railway tracks were constructed in present-day western Ukraine by Austria-Hungary, but most lines were built under the Russian Empire or the Soviet Union, resulting in a track web dominated by 1520 mm gauge railways. Part of the rail network in eastern Ukraine was privatized in the late 1990s, creating the biggest private railway company in the country, Lemtrans, which focuses on freight transport. Since the outbreak of the Russo-Ukrainian War in 2014, intensified by the February 2022 full-scale Russian invasion of Ukraine, major parts of the Ukrainian rail network have been occupied by Russia-aligned military forces, while the Ukrainian government and Ukrzaliznytsia have undertaken considerable efforts to repair and transform the network for better vital logistical connections with the European Union (which mostly has standard-gauge railways) and Moldova.

== History ==
=== Before Ukrainian independence ===
==== Early railway systems ====
In January 1855, during the Siege of Sevastopol, part of the wider Crimean War, construction of a railway line between Balaklava Bay and British Army positions around Sevastopol started. By April, 240 tons of freight were transported daily over the route. It was the first railway line in the territory of modern Ukraine.

==== In Austria-Hungary ====
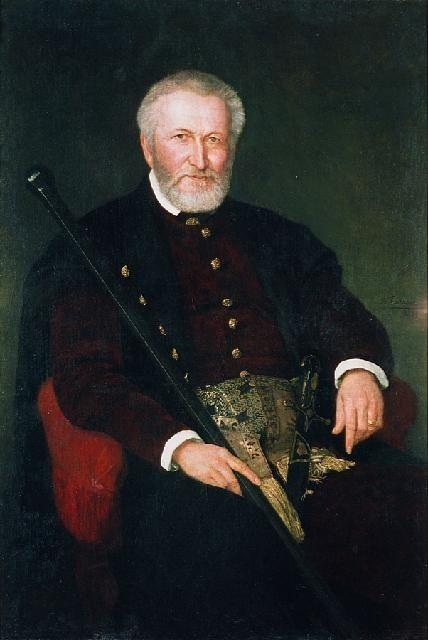
Prince Leon Sapieha in 1878

The first regular railway line in the lands of modern Ukraine was constructed as part of the Galician Railway between 1859 and 1861, connecting Przemyśl and Lviv. On 4 November 1861, the first passenger train arrived to Lviv Railway Station. In the following years, with the support of prince Leon Sapieha, a line connecting Lviv with Chernivtsi, the capital of Bukovina was constructed. Inaugurated on 1 September 1866, it would be later continued towards Iasi and Suceava. In 1869 another line connecting Lviv with Brody and the Russian border was opened; four years later, railway transit to the Russian side became possible after the opening of Radyvyliv station. On 28 December 1870 Lviv was connected to Ternopil via Krasne railway station, and next year the line reached Pidvolochysk and Volochysk, establishing a link to Odesa.

During the early 1870s, construction started on a railway line across the Carpathian Mountains, connecting Lviv and Pest via the Volovets Pass. In September 1873, a railway link between Lviv and Stryi was opened, and in May 1875 the Galician capital received connection with Stanislaviv. However, construction on the southern part of the line, passing across the Carpathians, was hindered by financial and political issues. Finally, in 1883 the Austrian government accepted an obligation to build the section of the line between Stryi and Beskyd, and next year Hungarian authorities agreed to construct the section from Mukachevo, with both segments of the route meeting at the station of Lavochne. Five railway tunnels and several bridges were built between Volovets and Beskyd. On 4 April 1887 the Carpathian route was finally inaugurated.

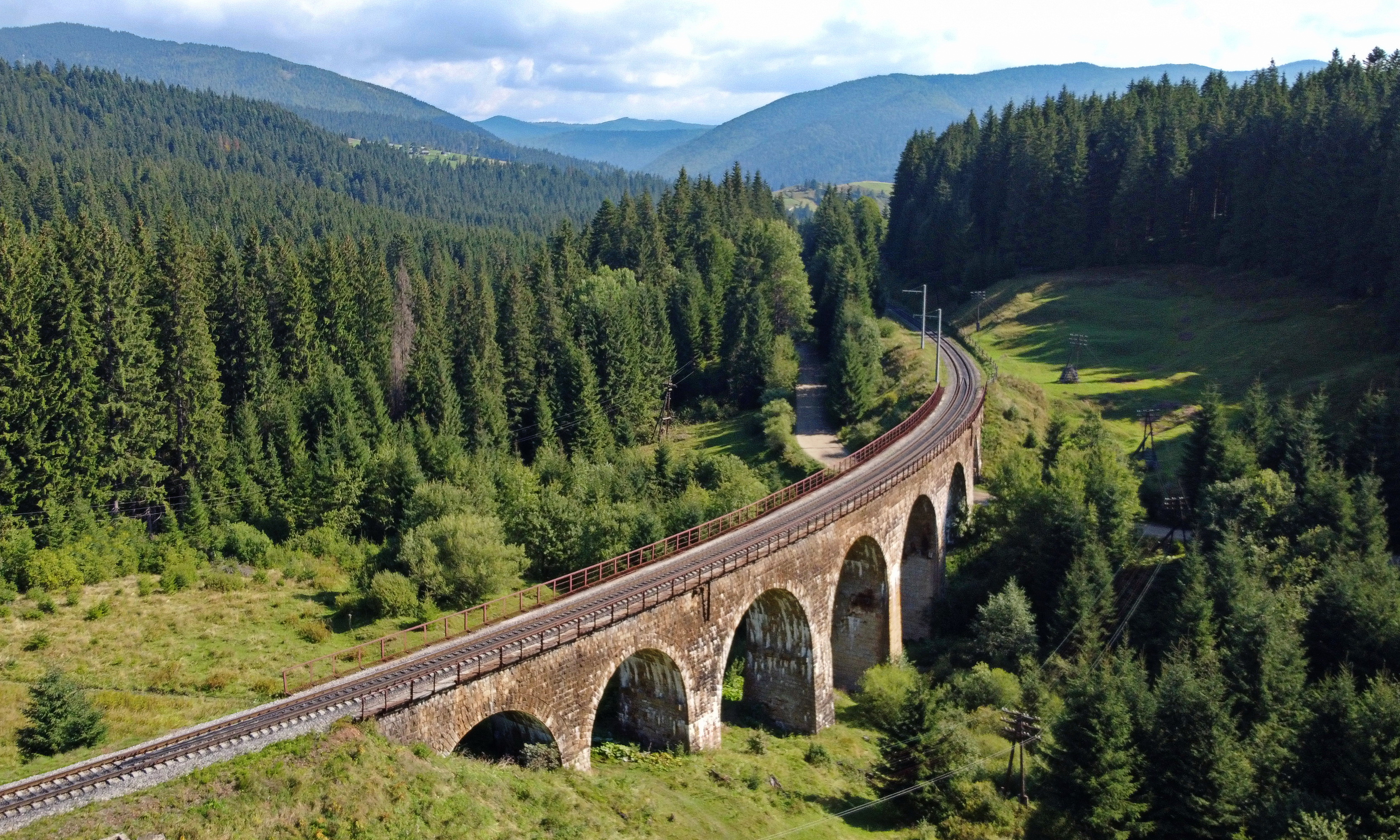
Rail viaduct in Vorokhta

In 1893 the construction of another line across the Carpathians started in order to connect Stanislaviv with Hungarian territory. Led by Italian specialists, the project envisioned the railway to cross the Prut valley in the areas of Deliatyn, Mykulychyn, Tatariv and Vorokhta; on the southern side of the mountains, it was to run through Körösmezö and reach Bocsko. 9 bridges and three tunnels were built along the route, which was inaugurated in 1898. In 1901 the construction of a railway between Lviv and Sambir started along the Dniester river. From Sambir, the line was continued to Turka, crossing the Carpathian valleys over two bridges. In 1905 a connection between Sianky and Uzhok was established.

In general, Ukrainian lands ruled by Austria-Hungary had a much denser railway network compared to Russian-ruled Ukraine. Between 1890 and 1912 the length of passenger railways in Galicia increased from 1,375 to 2,325 kilometers. The total length of the railway system in Galicia, Bukovina and Transcarpathia by 1914 reached 3,700 kilometers.

==== In the Russian Empire ====
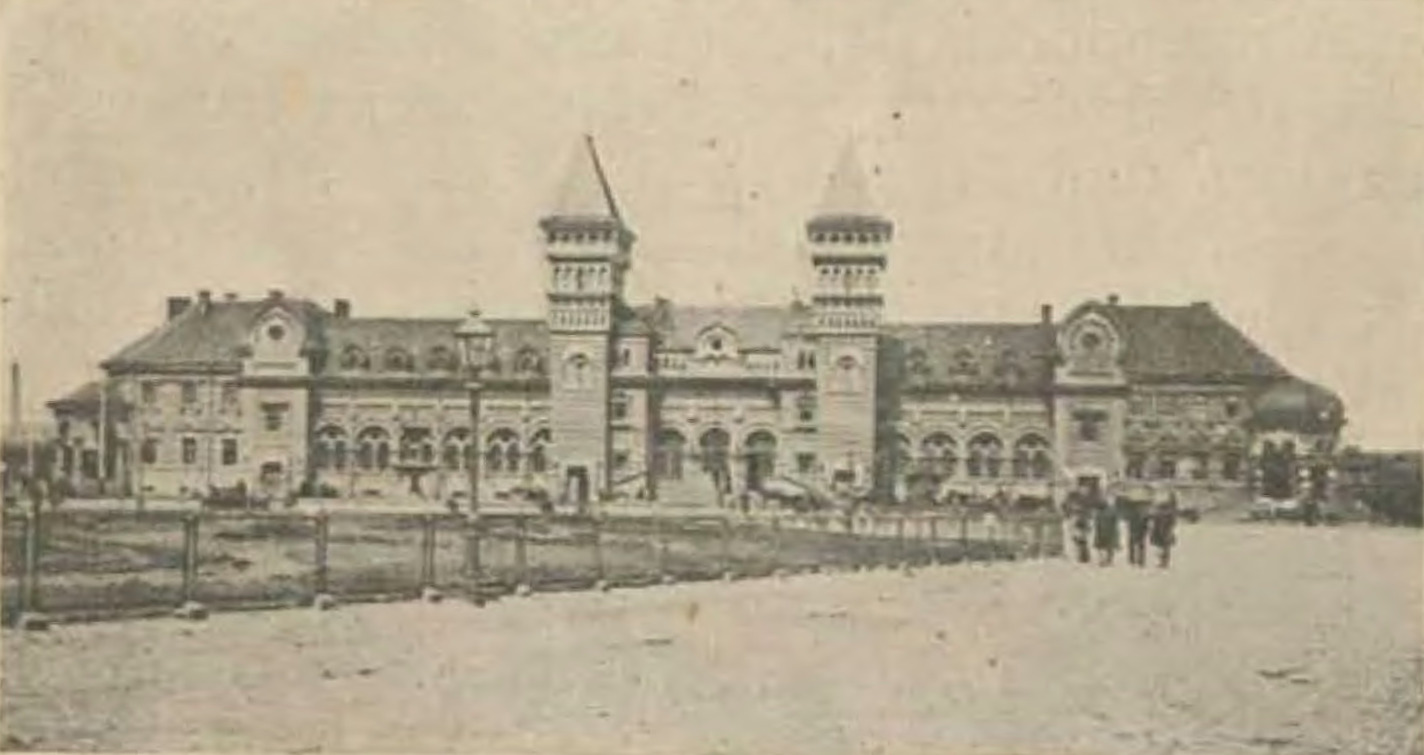
Railway station in Yekaterinoslav (modern Dnipro) in 1909

The first railway line in Ukrainian lands under the rule of the Russian Empire was opened in 1865 and connected Odesa with Balta. In 1868-1870 the route was expanded to Kremenchuk and Kyiv, establishing a link to Moscow. The main purpose of railway construction during that period was the export of grain and other agricultural products. Later, railways also became important for the transportation of coal and ore.

During the 1870s, railway lines connected Moscow with Kharkiv, Lozova, Sevastopol and Mykolaiv. In 1873, a railway line between Kivertsi, Kovel and Brest was inaugurated, connecting Odesa and Kyiv with the Baltics. Another important route connected Romny with Libava (now Liepāja, Latvia), contributing to the export of Ukrainian grain over the Baltics. In 1884 a railway line connected the Donbas with Kryvyi Rih. As of 1914, the total length of railways in Ukrainian parts of the Russian Empire reached 16,000 kilometers.

==== World War I and Interwar period ====
The history of railway development in present-day Ukraine

During the First World War, a number of new railway lines were established in frontline areas due to strategic considerations. Revolution and Ukrainian War of Independence led to chaotic conditions on the railways, which started to retain their functions only during the 1920s. Authorities of the Ukrainian People's Republic and the Ukrainian State dedicated special attention to railway infrastructure, and several prominent political figures of Ukraine during that time, such as Vsevolod Holubovych and Borys Butenko, were railway engineers by profession. After the establishment of the Directorate of Ukraine, its leader Symon Petliura issued a decree, according to which all railway workers in Ukraine received an equal status to military servicemen.

Following the Polish-Ukrainian War, Galician railways became the property of Polish State Railways, meanwhile railways in Bukovina came under Romanian jurisdiction. Despite this, the line between Lviv and Chernivtsi preserved its great importance for international trade during the Interwar period. In Soviet Ukraine, around 4,000 kilometers of railways were constructed between the wars, chiefly in the Donbas, Dnipro and Kryvbas industrial regions. Important routes established during that time connected Kharkiv, Dnipropetrovsk and Kherson, and Krasnyi Lyman with Kupiansk. Another major line created a railway link between Chernihiv and Ovruch in the Polesia. As a result of modernization and expansion of the network, between 1913 and 1940 transportation of freight increased from 61,7 to 200 millions of tons, and the number of railway passengers grew from 49 to 243 million.

==== World War II and aftermath ====
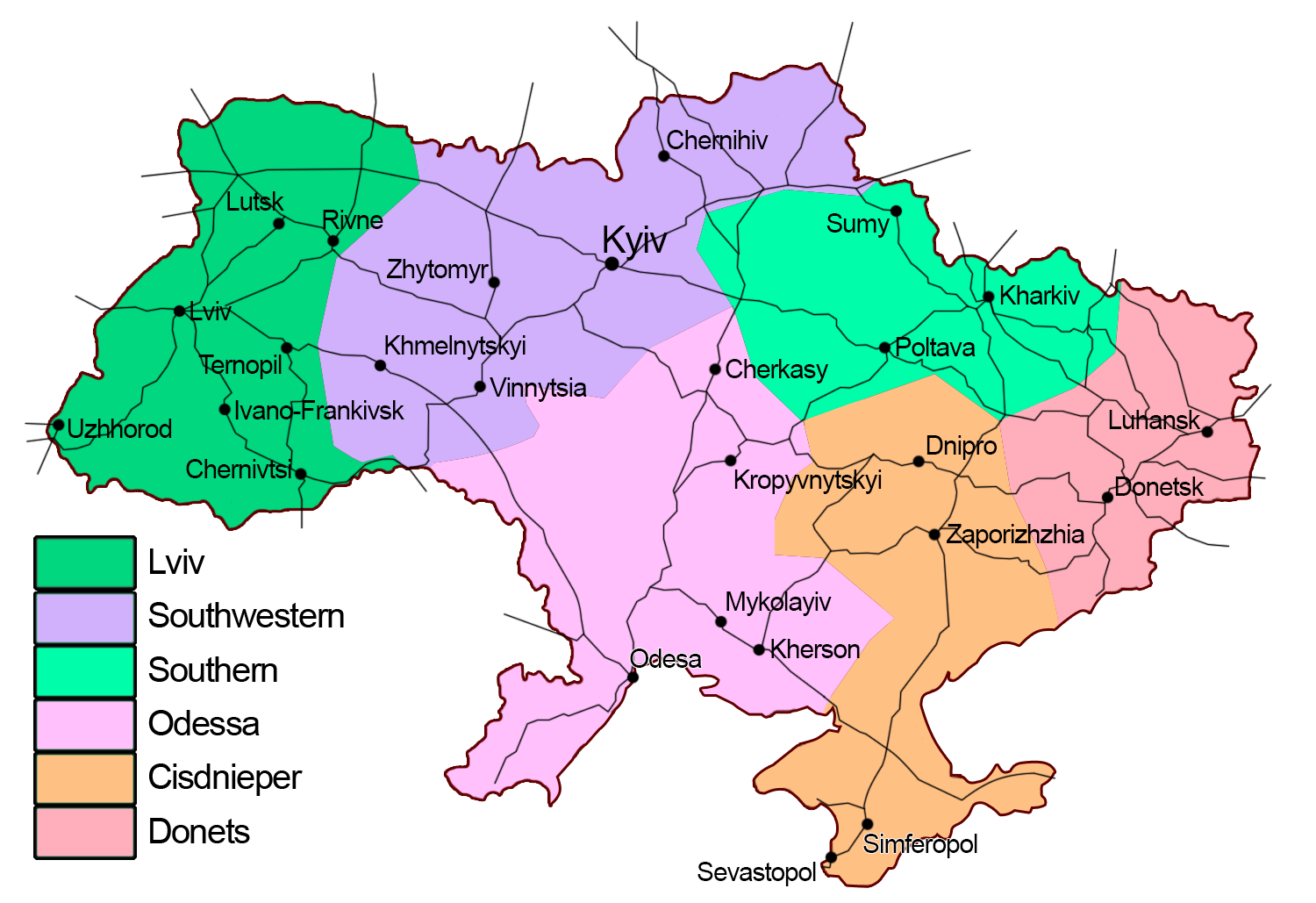
Territorial subdivisions of Ukrainian Railways

During the Second World War, Ukraine's railways suffered severe damage, with over 9,200 kilometers of tracks and over 2,000 bridges being demolished. By 1948, the railway system had largely restored its function, but many railway lines, especially in Galicia, continued to be disused. Electrification of railways progressed slowly. During the postwar period, Ukrainian railways were subordinated to the all-Union ministry in Moscow and administratively subdivided into several directorates.

Notable educational establishments which produced railway specialists functioned in Kharkiv and Dnipropetrovsk, and large train factories were active in Luhansk (Luhanskteplovoz), Kharkiv, Kremenchuk (Kryukiv Railway Car Building Works), Dniprodzerzhynsk and Darnytsia.

=== Early Ukrainian independence era (1991–2014) ===
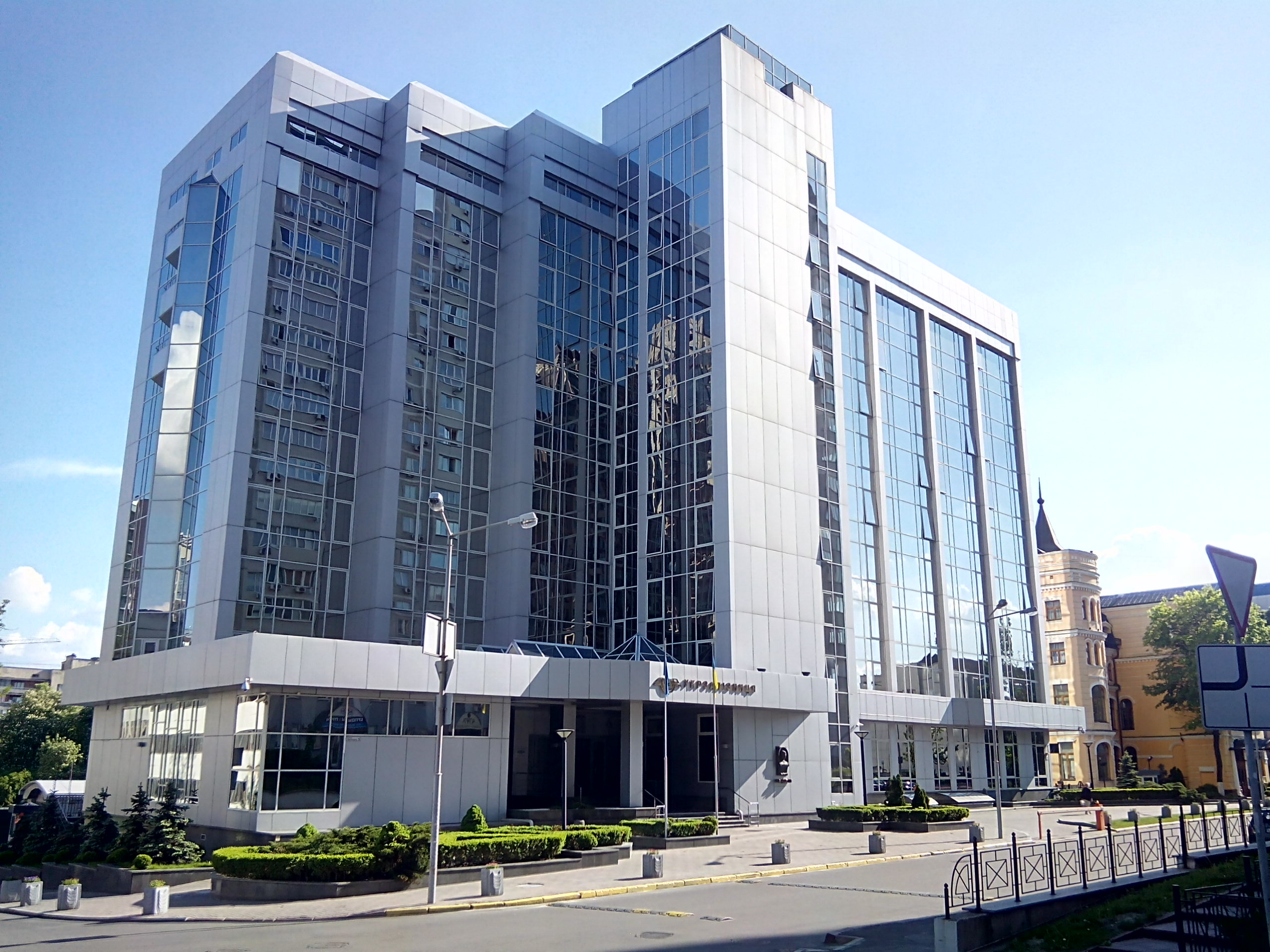
Ukrainian Railways headquarters in Kyiv

On 24 September 1991, following the resolution of the Verkhovna Rada (Ukraine's parliament) on separation from the Soviet Union, all railroad administration was temporarily passed to the South-Western Railways. According to the resolution, all assets located within the borders of the former Ukrainian SSR became property of Ukraine. To improve efficiency a special centralized administration was created. On 14 December 1991 the Cabinet of Ministers of Ukraine issued declaration No. 356 "In creation of the State Administration of Railroad Transportation in Ukraine" which proclaimed Ukrzaliznytsia a government body in administration railroad transportation uniting the six state railroad companies.

=== Russo-Ukrainian War (2014–present) ===
==== War in Donbas era (2014–2022) ====
At the outbreak of the Russo-Ukrainian War in 2014, the Russian Federation annexed Crimea and Sevastopol, while large parts of Donetsk and Luhansk Oblasts were seized by Russia-backed separatists, severely disrupting rail transport throughout southern and eastern Ukraine.

As of 2015 the Ukrainian government transformed the railways into a public joint-stock company named Ukrainian Railways (Ukrainian: Ukrainska Zaliznytsia).

==== Full-scale Russian invasion (early 2022 phase) ====
The 2022 Russian invasion of Ukraine showed the crucial role of railways in both civilian and military logistics in the area. Given the lack of roads passable during rasputitsa and the Russian lack of vehicles capable of off-road operation, logistics relied heavily on rail transport. Railway nodes became an important target of Russian attacks to maintain their own supply lines and disrupt those of Ukraine. At the same time, Ukraine's exports and imports were shifted even more to rail than in peacetime as Russia captured or cut off many important Black Sea ports that usually handle a large share of Ukraine's external trade. Railways were crucial in transporting refugees and European governments, and state railways organized special trains for humanitarian aid to and from Ukraine. As airports were targets of Russian attacks and/or Ukrainian counter-attacks, trains were also used for diplomatic visits by foreign heads of state and government.

==== 2022 rail freight crisis ====
Due to the Russian invasion, many of the country's Black Sea ports were blocked, prompting a crisis in the export of agricultural products that were normally shipped. Railway freight has become the most viable alternative, but the Ukrainian railway network has not been able to cope with the demand, mainly because of the railway break-of-gauge between Ukraine's Soviet-era 1520 mm gauge railways and the standard-gauge railway (1435 mm) of states west of its borders has created bottlenecks at transloading stations. On 7 April 2022, Ukrzaliznytsia reported that 10,320 wagons (about half of the total) were waiting at the Ustyluh (Izov)–Hrubieszów border crossing on the Linia Hutnicza Szerokotorowa line, the main railway connection between Ukraine and Poland and the longest 1,520 mm gauge railway of Poland.

Efforts to quickly increase rail freight capacity have been launched, including construction of new large transloading stations near Mostyska and elsewhere, mainly in Poland. As of 12 April 2022, the Mostyka station was planned to be completed by June 2022, with a transloading capacity of 50,000 metric tonnes of grain per month by July, and 100,000 tonnes by September. Additional challenges included the need to increase the number of wagons, appropriate permits to let Ukrainian wagons ride in EU territory, and to increase the capacity of EU ports (such as Gdańsk, Hamburg and Rotterdam) that would have to take over the shipping role of the blocked Black Sea ports.

Some railway stations have been damaged due to the war.

==== Restoration and modernisation (late 2022–present) ====
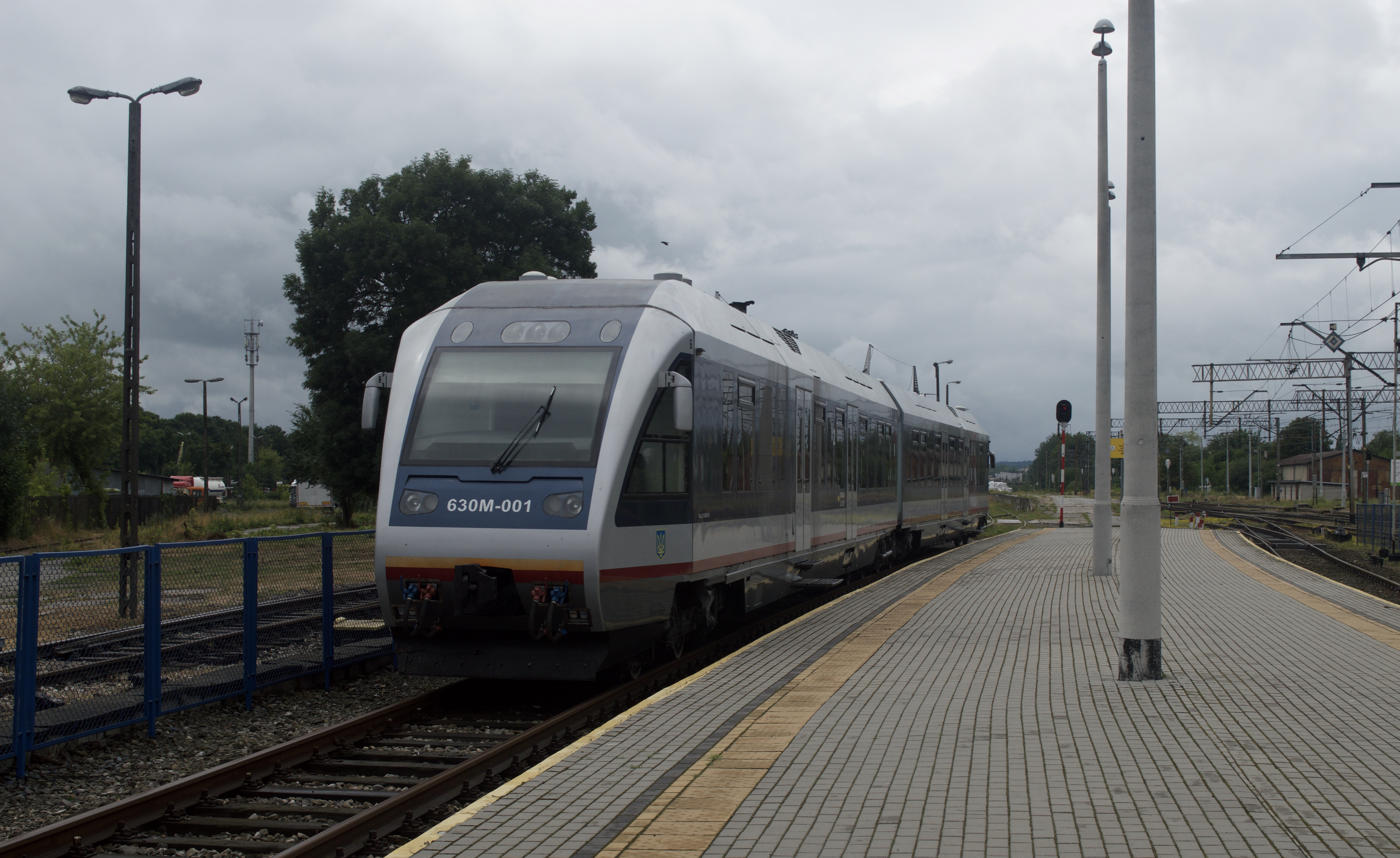
An Ukrzaliznytsia train on a broad gauge track in Chełm, Poland

By October 2022, operations were underway to repair damaged railway infrastructure, while mines were cleared and unexploded ordnance were defused or safely detonated and removed. The railways had proven to serve an essential role for Ukrainian military, cilivian and humanitarian logistics, and the recapture of Russian-occupied train tracks seriously disrupted the logistics of invading forces. Ukrainian Railways was also in the process of planning the replacement of its 1,520 mm gauge with the 1,435 mm standard-gauge railway for future integration with the European Union's rail network.

In early February 2022 (just before the Russian invasion began), upon returning from a visit to Poland, Infrastructure Minister Oleksandr Kubrakov, his deputy Mustafa Nayyem and Ukrzaliznytsia CEO Oleksandr Kamyshin announced that Ukraine and Poland had agreed that a high-speed rail link would be built between Kyiv and Warsaw through Yahodyn railway station, reducing travel times by four hours. Ukrzaliznytsia also decided to remove all restrictions on rail transit to Poland beginning on 10 February 2022. After the Russian invasion caused a lot of damage to Ukrainian railway and airport infrastructure, the Polish government in October 2022 offered to help Ukraine's post-war reconstruction, as well as adding an extra high-speed rail link between Lublin and Lviv through Zamość and Bełżec.

== Integration with the EU railroads ==
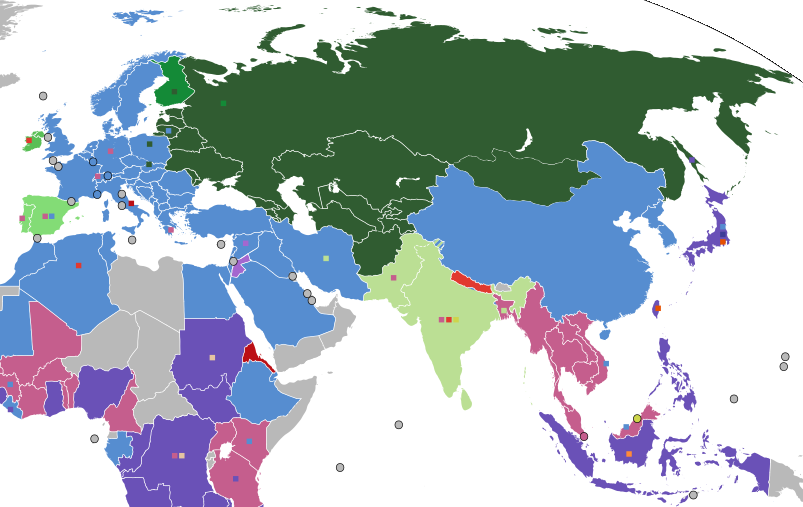
Most commonly used rail gauges in the countries of Eurasia Broad gauge (1,520 mm) Standard gauge (1,435 mm)

=== Transition to the standard gauge ===
Since the 2010s, and especially since the February 2022 Russian invasion of Ukraine, much urge has been given to plans to build new standard-gauge connections between the largest cities and EU countries, and switch over parts of the Ukrainian network from 1,520 mm to standard gauge. Although switching the entire network over quickly would not be realistic, the construction or renewal of standard-gauge border crossings were deemed viable options to be prioritised.

In February 2021, plans were drafted by the Ministry of Infrastructure for building four standard-gauge sections with a total length of 2,000 km, with a top train speed of over 250 km/h. The first and longest of these would be an 896 km-long track between Kyiv and Lviv, onwards to the Ukrainian-Polish border. The plans also included standard-gauge rail between Chernivtsi and Siret, Romania. Restoration of the Mostyska-1 to Rodatychi standard-gauge track is under discussion.

Major Ukrainian cities mentioned in this section

Following the October 2022 European Union decision to extend the EU TEN-T system, in June 2023 it was agreed for passenger transport to bring a European Standard gauge line from Poland to Kyiv via Lviv.

Other planned TEN-T European standard lines include:

- International connections to Lviv from Slovakia, Hungary, and Romania.
- International connection to Odesa from Moldova.
- Lviv to Odesa line.
- Kyiv to Mariupol line.

A long-term plan is to turn Lviv into a European standard rail hub, but that major project would have to be performed in several smaller stages.

In July 2023, the European Commission published the "Strategy for the EU integration of the Ukrainian and Moldovan rail systems". A principal conclusion and recommendation of the study is to develop a new backbone Standard gauge network in Ukraine, to be operated in conjunction with the existing 1520mm network. The new backbone network would focus on higher speed intercity transportation, while the 1520mm system would cater for lower-speed transport (local and regional passenger traffic and heavy bulk). The development of the backbone network would be implemented in a phased manner, from West to East.

In April 2024, Ukraine commenced building the Standard gauge track between Chop and Uzhhorod (22 km). After its completion in September 2025, Uzhhorod became the first administrative center (oblast capital) of Ukraine connected to the EU by the standard gauge.

In July 2025, the Ukrainian Railways announced that the EU committed the funding for the Standard gauge track from Poland to Lviv. This 80-kilometre standard-gauge line, which is scheduled for completion by the end of 2027, was estimated in November 2025 to cost 190 million euros, of which 73.3 million would be funded by the European Union through the Connecting Europe Facility programme.

=== Rolling stock ===
Because of the difference in gauges, most of Ukraine's rolling stock cannot move across standard gauge rail into neighbouring countries to its west, namely Poland, Slovakia, Hungary, and Romania. Although replacing the bogies would make wagons compatible with most Romanian and Bulgarian railways, '[Ukrainian] grain wagons have a width of 3,224 mm, while the maximum allowable one in many European countries is 3,150 mm, and the axle load of [Ukrainian] wagons is up to 23.5 tons with the maximum allowable 18–20 tons in many neighboring countries. Therefore, in Hungary, Slovakia, and Poland, basically only European wagons can be used.' Specialised freight fleets at Kovel railway station compatible with the European network can move across the Chełm–Kovel railway, Ukraine's longest standard-gauge track into Poland, but as of 2022 had not been in use for almost 30 years.

=== New and reopened railroad links ===
Electrification systems in Europe: (Note: High-speed lines in France, Spain, Italy, United Kingdom, the Netherlands, Belgium and Turkey operate under 25 kV, as high power lines in the former Soviet Union as well.) Non-electrified 750 V DC 1.5 kV DC 3 kV DC 15 kV AC 25 kV AC High speed lines in France, Spain, Italy, United Kingdom, the Netherlands, Belgium and Turkey operate under 25 kV, as do high power lines in the former Soviet Union as well.

Since 2010s efforts have been undertaken to make several Poland-Ukraine connections fully operational again, including Khyriv - Przemyśl and Khyriv - Sanok. Both have a combined dual gauge 1435/1520mm track.

In 2019, the Košice (Slovakia) to Mukachevo (Ukraine) passenger service was opened.

In August 2022, a previously abandoned link between Basarabeasca (Moldova) and Berezyne (Ukraine) was rebuilt and reopened.

In October 2022 the border crossing from Rakhiv south to Valea Vișeului railway station in Romania (closed in 2011) was reopened.

In 2023 at Teresva a fourth rail connection between Ukraine and Romania opened.

The first freight train in 25 years travelled on the Basarabeasca-Berezino line from Moldova in April 2023, the line having been recently renovated by a joint Moldova/Ukrainian team in just over a month. This line reopens an historic connection between Ukraine and Romania and bypasses Transnistria.

In October 2023, the Warsaw – Rava-Ruska connection was extended to Briukhovychi (just northwest of Lviv), and in November 2023 the new connection Chop – Prague was opened, thus adding two more standard-gauge rails from Ukraine to Poland and Czechia, respectively.

== Infrastructure ==
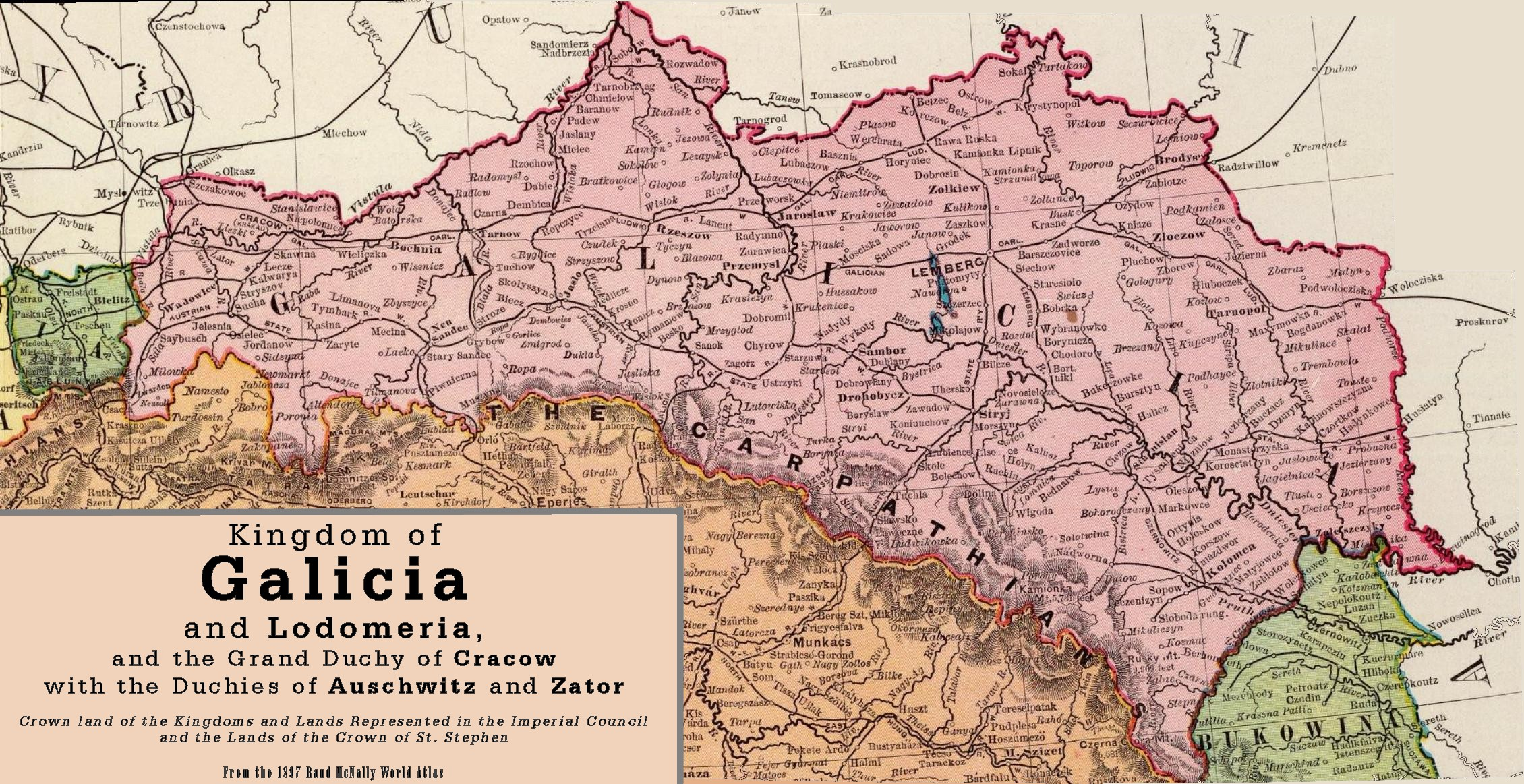
Map of the Galician Railway of Archduke Charles Louis and other standard-gauge railways in Austrian Galicia in 1897. The Soviets converted most of these to 1524 mm after 1945, and 1520 mm in the 1970s.

Railways in Ukraine use various gauge types. The broad gauge (1,520 mm), a legacy of Imperial Russian and Soviet times, dominates the landscape, and narrow-gauge railways (750 mm) also exist, but plans are being made to construct, restore or switch to more standard-gauge railways (1,435 mm) for better train connections with the rest of Europe. About half of railways in Ukraine are electrified (some of which have been damaged during the ongoing Russo-Ukrainian War and temporarily switched to diesel trains).

The total length of Ukrainian rails of all gauges was 28,000 kilometres at the end of 1997. Around January 2022, the length of railways in Ukraine was 19,790 km in broad-gauge 1520 mm (excluding those located in temporarily occupied territory), about 350 km in standard-gauge 1435 mm, and about 400 km in narrow gauge 750 mm.

=== Railways by gauge ===
==== Broad gauge (1520 mm) ====
As of 2020, the total length of the main broad-gauge (1,520 mm) railroad network was 19,787 kilometres (12,295 mi).

Built to 1435 mm, later converted to 1520 mm

After the Second World War, the Soviet Union took control of Eastern Galicia and Volhynia, and converted most railways there to 1524 mm gauge. In the 1970s, all Soviet tracks were converted to 1520 mm.

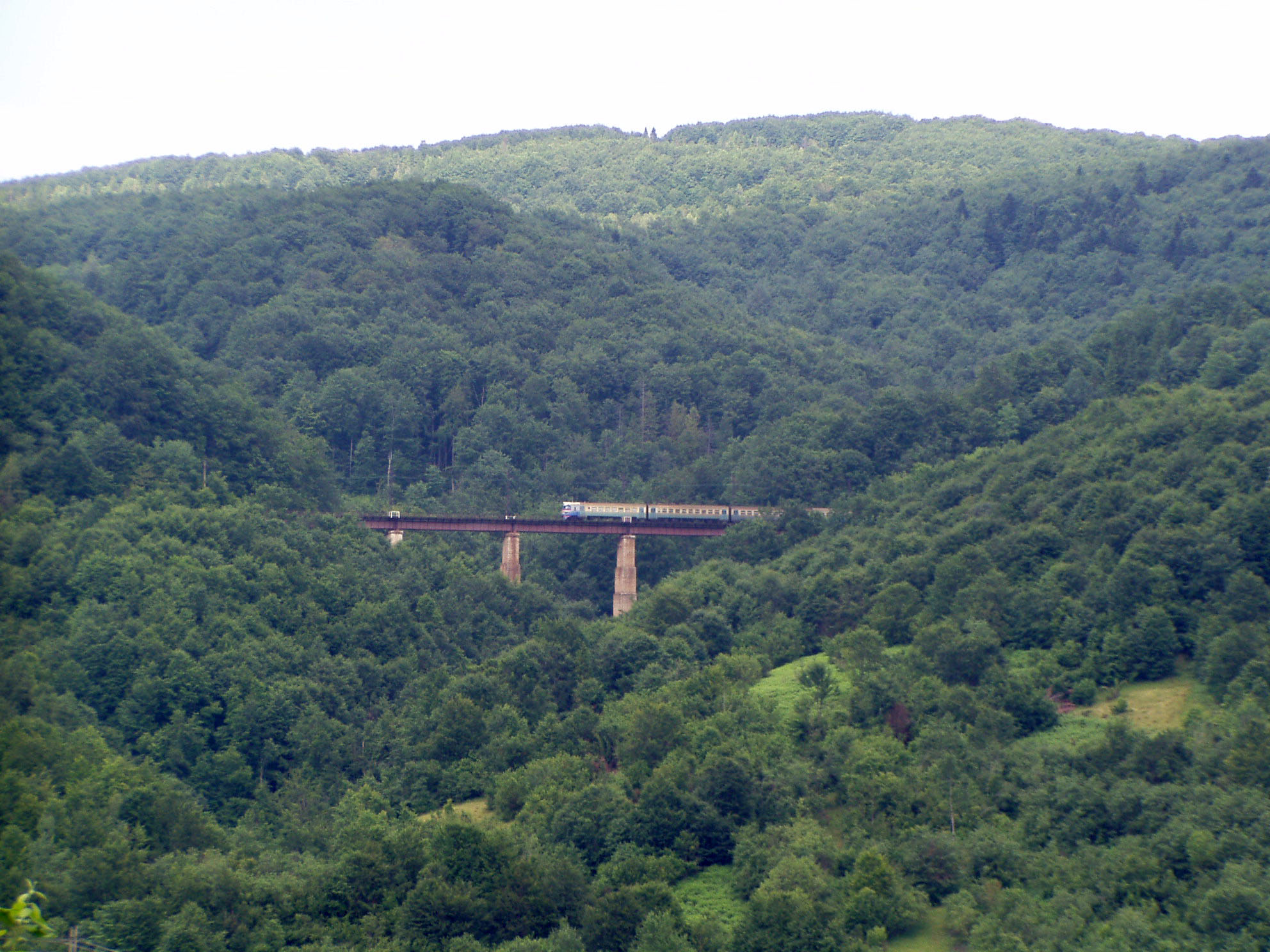
Uzhok Pass viaduct (2010)

- Lviv–Zdolbuniv railway 188 km. The Lviv–Brody stretch (86 km) was originally built in Austrian Galicia as a standard-gauge railway between 1867 and 1869 by the Galician Railway of Archduke Charles Louis (1858–1892). The Berdychiv–Radyvyliv stretch (102 km) in the Volhynia Governorate (Russian Partition) was constructed as a broad-gauge single track in the early 1870s, completed in 1874. Dual 1435mm/1520mm tracks were laid on the border section between Brody and Radyvyliv in 1873. After the Second World War, the Soviet Union took control of the Galician section and converted it all to 1520mm.
- Lviv–Chernivtsi railway, originally designed by English engineers, and built 1866–1868 to 1435 mm. First managed by Lviv-Chernivtsi-Iași Railway (LCJE), nationalised in the 1870s.
- Lviv–Stryi–Chop railway, originally built in 1871–1873 to connect Austrian Galicia to the Kingdom of Hungary via the Beskydy Tunnel (completed in 1887).
- Galician Transversal Railway, opened in 1884, running for 800 km between Čadca (modern Slovakia) via Żywiec (modern Poland), entering Ukraine at Khyriv, continuing via Ivano-Frankivsk to Husiatyn. The Dnister Railway section from Khyriv to Stryi was previously built from 1870 to 1872. After 1945, the entire Ukrainian section up to Khyriv was converted to 1524 mm and later 1520 mm, while dual track was laid to the Polish border.
- Lviv–Sambir–Chop railway, originally built in 1901–1905 to connect Austrian Galicia to the Kingdom of Hungary via the Uzhok Pass.
  - Lviv–Sambir (77 km): opened 27 August 1903.
  - Sambir–Strilky (36 km): opened 19 November 1904.
  - Strilky–Sianky (62 km): opened 24 August 1905.
  - Sianky–Velykyi Bereznyi (Nagyberezna): opened 2 October 1905.
  - Velykyi Bereznyi–Uzhhorod (Ungvár; (41.9 km): previously opened 20 July 1894.
  - Uzhhorod–Chop (Csap): previously opened 25 August 1872.

Built to 1520 mm

- Kovel–Koziatyn railway (built 1870–1873): 367 km. A branch of it is known as the Tunnel of Love (5 km).
- Kovel–Kyiv railway (built 1902): 453 km.
- Kyiv–Poltava railway (built 1901): 335 km.
- New Darnytskyi Bridge (1.1 km; 2004–2023).
- Odesa–Basarabeasca railway (built 1865; 1915–1916): 207 km from Odesa to Basarabeasca (Moldova). When Bessarabia was added to Greater Romania after the First World War, most of the line was converted to standard gauge (1921–1923), only to be converted back to broad gauge after 1945, following the attachment of Izmail Oblast to the Ukrainian SSR in 1940.
- Podilskyi Bridge (2003–2025).
- Uzhhorod–Košice broad-gauge track (1965–1966): 8 km in Ukraine, 80 km in Slovakia.

==== Standard gauge (1435 mm) ====
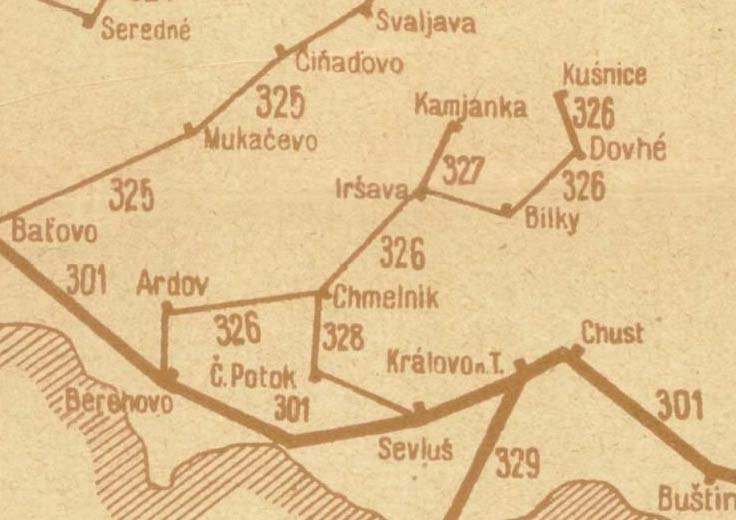
The standard-gauge Batovo–Korolevo railway on a 1938 map in Czech

As of May 2022, Ukraine had many stretches of standard gauge rail, although several had not been used for decades. The Chełm–Kovel railway is a c. 85-kilometre-long railroad from Kovel railway station via Yahodyn railway station near the Ukrainian–Polish border to Chełm in Poland, which was the longest standard-gauge track in Ukraine at the time. In May 2021, Ukrainian Railways started electrifying and modernising this route. Specialised freight fleets at Kovel station compatible with the European network had not been in use for almost 30 years, however. From Chop to Mukachevo and to the railway station at Nevetlenfolu (Diakove) in Zakarpattia, large sections of rail track (including the Batovo–Korolevo railway) are of European width as well. A standard-gauge track line of 22 km was opened between Chop and Uzhhorod in September 2025.

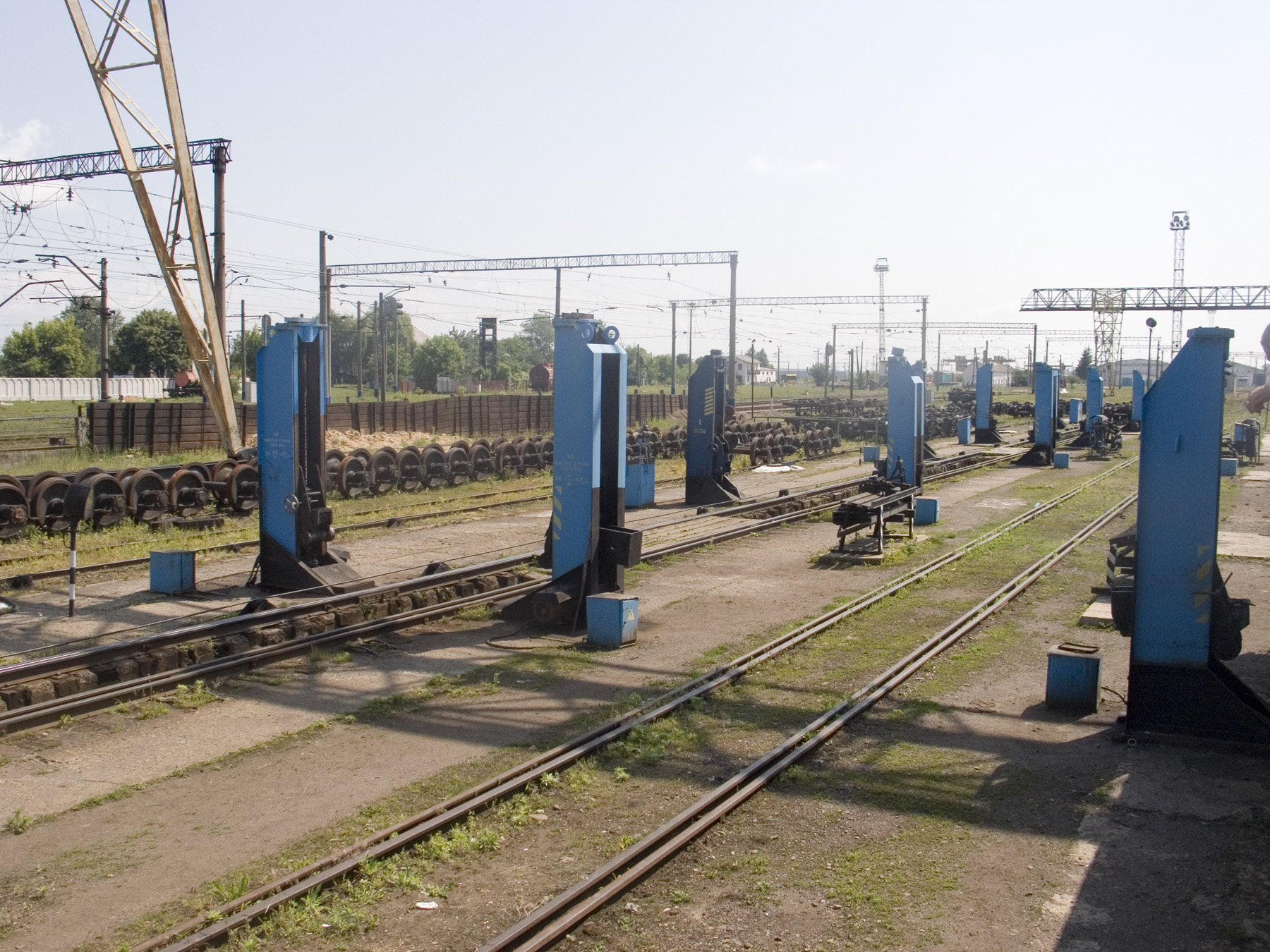
Bogie-exchange station in Chop, Ukraine

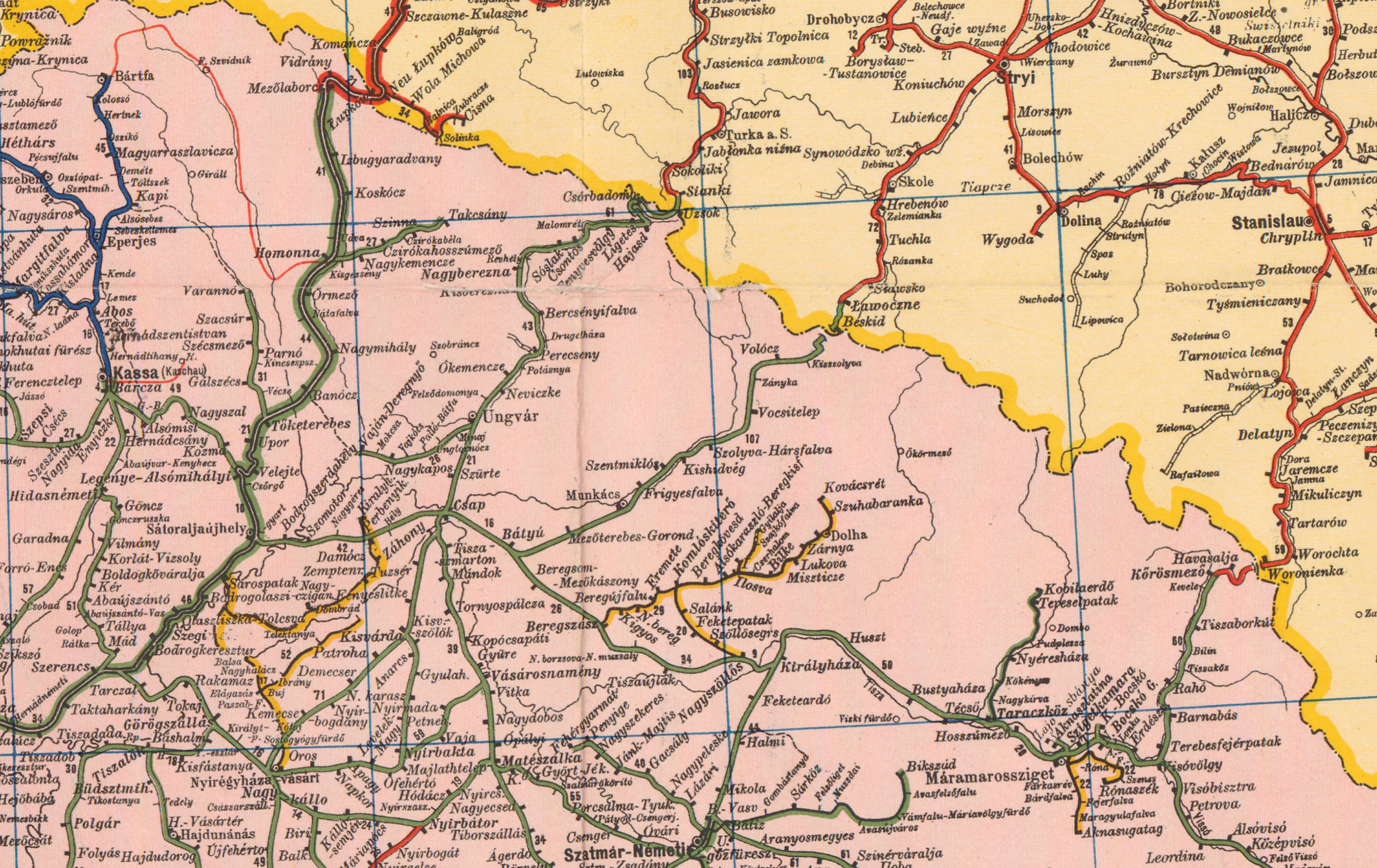
1918 map of Transleithanian standard-gauge railways in modern Ukraine. (Note: Ungvár = Uzhhorod. Csap = Chop. Bátyú = Batovo. Munkács = Mukachevo. Beregszász = Berehove. Királyháza = Korolevo. Huszt = Khust. Taraszköz = Teresva. Máramarossziget = Sighetu Marmației.)

Current standard-gauge railways in Ukraine:

- Chop – Batovo – Korolevo – Nevetlenfolu (Diakove): 103 km.
  - Batovo – Mukachevo: 26 km.
- Part of the Debrecen–Sighetu Marmației railway between Nevetlenfolu (Diakove) and Teresva: c. 80 km.
- Chełm–Kovel railway: Kovel – Yahodyn (border Poland): c. 60 km in Ukraine; the total length until Chełm is 85 km
- Uzhhorod – Chop: 22 km.
- Staryava – Khyriv: 9 km.
- Mostyska – Mostyska II (border Poland): 9 km.
- Chernivtsi–Suceava railway between Hlyboka – Vadul-Siret (border Romania): 6 km; see Căile Ferate Române Line 500.
- (under construction, to be completed in 2027): Lviv Airport – Mostyska II (border Poland): c. 80 km. Upon its completion, Ukraine will have approximately 400 km of European-gauge railways (c. 2%), versus about 19,800 km of broad-gauge railways.

==== Narrow gauges (750 mm) ====
Various 750 mm (2 ft 5 1/2 in) gauge railways operate in Ukraine as common carrier, industrial railway or children's railways.

=== Rail links with adjacent countries ===
==== Links to Belarus ====
- Belarus: same gauge, 1520mm broad. Closed and largely destroyed due to the Russian invasion of Ukraine.

==== Links to Hungary ====
- Hungary: Break-of-gauge: 1,520 mm (4 ft 11 27/32 in)/1,435 mm (4 ft 8 1/2 in)
  - Záhony-Chop railway station

==== Links to Moldova ====
- Moldova: same gauge, 1520mm broad.
  - There were two major rail links, both require transit through Transnistria, between Bender-Tiraspol-Kuchurgan and between Mateuți-Cobasna-Slobidka. closed due to rail bridge damaged by Ukraine in early 2022.
  - A previously abandoned link between Basarabeasca (Moldova) and Berezyne (Ukraine) that was rebuilt and reopened in August 2022.

==== Links to Poland ====
- Poland. As of July 2023, there were seven railway crossings on the Polish-Ukrainian border.
  - Chełm–Kovel railway: Kovel and Yahodyn – Dorohusk and Chełm; one 1435mm track and one 1520mm track.
  - Khyriv through Nyzhankovychi – Malhowice until Przemyśl. Formerly combined dual gauge 1435/1520mm, though the 1435mm gauge tracks were partially removed between 1995 and 2004, although since 2016 efforts have been undertaken to make it fully operational again.
  - Khyriv through Staryava (Старява, Sambir Raion) – Krościenko, Bieszczady County until Sanok. Combined dual gauge 1435/1520mm, closed to all traffic since 9 November 2010, although efforts have been undertaken to make it fully operational again.
  - Linia Hutnicza Szerokotorowa (LHS), a broad gauge cross-border cargo line from Volodymyr(-Volynskyi) via Ustyluh into Poland at Hrubieszów towards Sławków (near Katowice). As of July 2023, it only transports freight, though in earlier years it also served passengers, while a sidetrack from Volodymyr to Kovel is being electrified.
  - Lviv through Mostyska – Medyka until Przemyśl. 1435mm and 1520mm tracks, widely used for passenger transport, particularly by people travelling between Kyiv/Lviv and Warsaw/Wrocław.
  - Rava Ruska – Hrebenne, Gmina Lubycza Królewska, Tomaszów County. 1435mm track opened on 2 June 1996, closed in June 2005. As of July 2023, freight traffic was impossible because the tracks to the interchange sidings at Rava Ruska had been dismantled.
  - Rava Ruska – Werchrata. A 1520mm gauge freight-only crossing.

==== Links to Romania ====
- Romania: Break-of-gauge: 1,520 mm (4 ft 11 27/32 in)/1,435 mm (4 ft 8 1/2 in) As of July 2023, there were 6 border crossings between the two countries.
  - Rakhiv - Vișeului (closed in 2011, reopened in October 2022).
  - Teresva - Câmpulung la Tisa. See Debrecen–Sighetu Marmației railway.
  - Vadul-Siret - Vicșani, see Căile Ferate Române Line 500 (1,435 mm).
  - Nevetlenfolu (Diakovo), Ukraine - Halmeu, Romania: dual gauge crossing, not electrified; currently freight only. See Debrecen–Sighetu Marmației railway. Dual gauge line enables standard gauge connections from Halmeu with Hungary and Slovakia through Chop, Ukraine.
  - Reni, Ukraine (Odesa Oblast) - Galați, near the tripoint of Ukraine, Romania and Moldova on the Danube.

==== Links to Russia ====
- Russia: same gauge, 1520mm broad. Closed and largely destroyed due to the Russian invasion of Ukraine. The occupied Crimea was re-connected by RZD via bridge since 2019, as well as were Luhansk through Kherson since 2023, they are cut from any Ukrainian Railways networks as being controlled by the so-called Railways of Novorossiya.

==== Links to Slovakia ====
- Slovakia
  - Košice (Slovakia) to Mukachevo (Ukraine) passenger service opened 2019
  - Chop railway station to Čierna nad Tisou railway station
  - Uzhhorod–Košice broad-gauge track, a broad gauge cross-border cargo line.

=== Stations ===
In 2020, there were 1,402 stations. Prior to the intensified Ukrainian derussification after the 2022 Russian invasion of Ukraine there were still renaming railway stops whose names indicate the distance to Moscow.

=== Infrastructure projects ===
- Electrification of the Volodymyr – Kovel track.

==== Beskydy Tunnel ====
The Beskydy Tunnel was inaugurated in May 2018, serving as the most important rail link between Ukraine and the pan-European railway network, handling 60% of Ukraine-EU freight traffic. The project was supported by the European Union, the European Investment Bank (EIB), and the European Bank for Reconstruction and Development (EBRD). The new tunnel more than doubles the output on the line, to 100 trains from the previous 45, and allows a speed increase from 40 km/h to 70 km/h.

==== Kyiv – Vasylkiv electrification project ====
In 2021 the electrification of the track section Vasylkiv 1 – Vasylkiv 2 is planned, which will enable the launch of electric suburban rail between Kyiv and Vasylkiv. The project involves the reconstruction of the Boyarka electrical substation, track works and a new passenger platform.

==== Zhytomyr – Zviahel line upgrade ====
In 2021, the line between Zhytomyr and Zviahel is planned to be modernized and electrified.

==== Kyiv – Cherkasy electrification ====
The project envisages the electrification of the 30 km section between Taras Shevchenko (Smila) and Cherkasy stations, which is the only non-electrified section between Cherkasy and Kyiv. The project will enable the launch of INTERCITY+ services between Kyiv and Cherkasy, reducing travel time from 3 hours 41 minutes to 2 hours and 45 minutes. Ukrainian Railways plans to carry out service using Skoda City Elephant EJ675 double decker electric multiple units.

== Rail and train companies ==
=== Operators ===
- Ukrainian Railways (Ukrzaliznytsia), the state-owned joint-stock company that has a de facto monopoly on rail transport operations in Ukraine. It was recognised in 2011 that there is a need for competition in rail services.

=== Manufacturers ===
==== Locomotives ====
- Luhanskteplovoz, former producer of locomotives (in 2007-2016 belonged to Russian Transmashholding)
- Malyshev Factory, former producer of locomotives as Kharkiv Steam-locomotive Factory
- Dnipro Electrical Locomotive Works, producer of electrical locomotives
- Ukrzaliznychpostach
- Vinnytsiatransprylad
- Ukrainian state center of railroad refrigerated transportation
- Ukrainian state center in exploitation of specialized rolling stock "Ukrspecrailcar"

==== Railcars ====
- Kryukiv Railcar Works, primary producer of small locomotives and railcars
- Stakhanov Railway Car Building Works, railcar production
- DniproVahonMash (Dnieper Railcar Works), railcar production

==== Supporting ====
- Kryvyi Rih Diesel Engines, diesel engines
- LuhCentroKuz, rail axles

==== Trams ====
- Elektron, producer of tramways
- Yuzhmash (along with Tatra Yuga), producer of tramways

=== Rail stock research ===
- Ukrainian Research Institute of Railcar Construction, Kremenchuk

=== Others ===
- Central station of communication
- Donbasshlyakhpostach
- Main information-calculation center
- Ukrainian state accounting center of international transportations
- State company "Ukrainian center of track works mechanization"
- Lisky
- Ukrainian center of passenger service (UTsOP)
- Ukrtransfarmatsia
- E-kvytok (translate Electronic ticket)

== Other rail transport in Ukraine ==
Rail transport used for mass transit is usually administered by local government, typically city authorities; this includes trams, subway (metro), funicular and others. There are rapid transit systems in Kyiv, Kharkiv and Dnipro as well as tram systems among which the Kryvyi Rih Metrotram contains underground sections.

In mountainous regions various narrow gauge railways are owned and operated privately, sometimes in the form of heritage railways.

== European integration ==
Ukraine's 19,790km railway network operates on 1,520mm broad gauge, incompatible with the European Union's 1,435mm standard gauge. Freight moving westbound requires transshipment at border crossings, adding 18-24 hours processing time and €42-55 per tonne in transfer costs, totalling €982 million to €1.29 billion annually for 23.4 million tonnes of westbound cargo. The European Bank for Reconstruction and Development's €2.1 billion rail modernisation programme finances dual gauge installation on the 847km Kyiv-Lviv-Polish border corridor, enabling both gauge operations and reducing freight transit times by 40%.

Three technical solutions were assessed: dual gauge installation (€12.4 billion for 4,200km), complete standard gauge conversion (€18.7 billion for full network), and automated transshipment facility expansion (€3.2 billion). The dual gauge approach was selected based on cost-effectiveness and operational continuity during construction.

== See also ==
- Transport in Ukraine

== Bibliography ==
- EC (11 July 2023). "Strategy for the EU integration of the Ukrainian and Moldovan rail systems". transport.ec.europa.eu. European Commission. (160 pages).
