= Batovo–Korolevo railway =

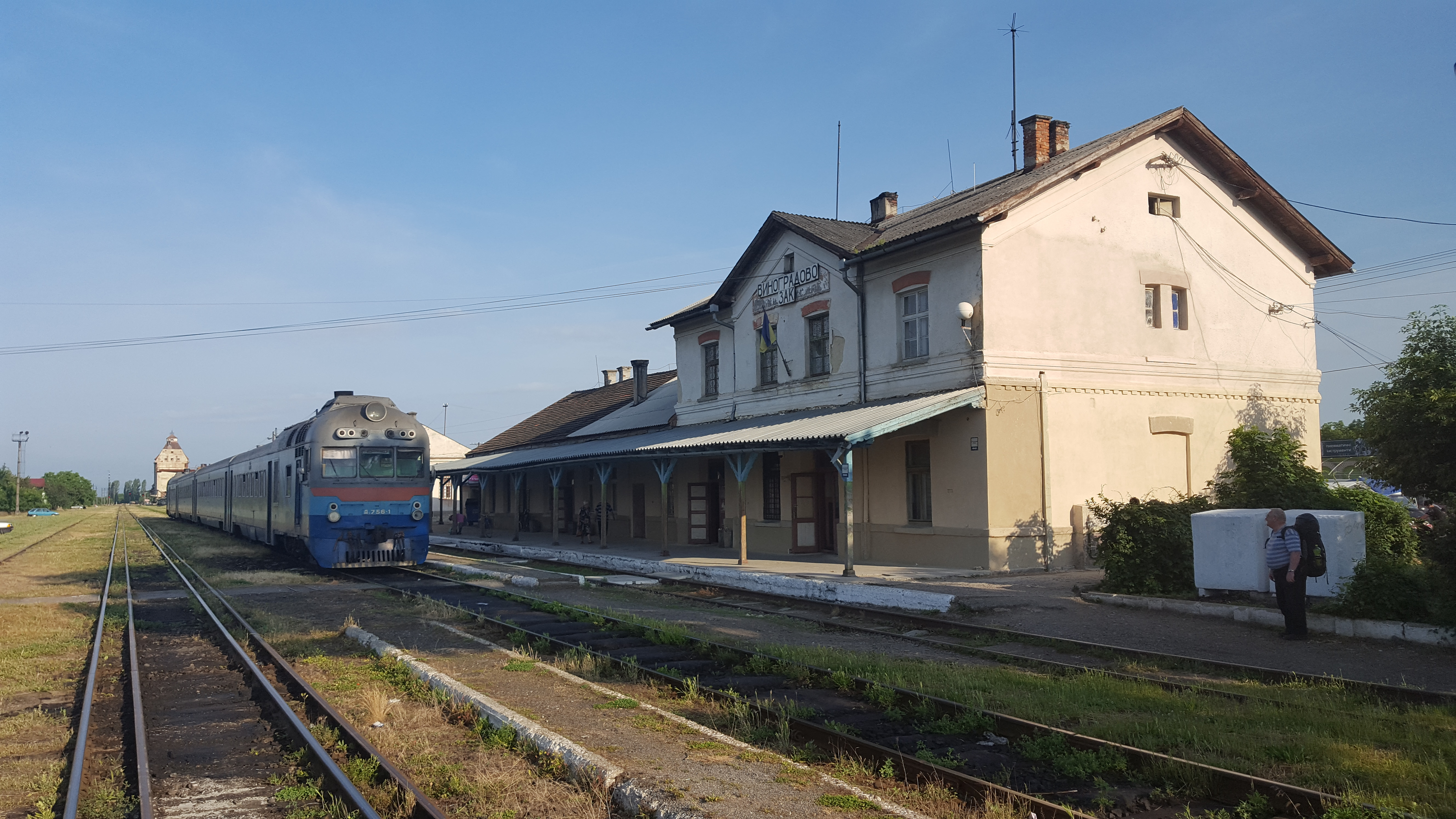
- Vynohradiv railway station, with a diesel multiple unit D1-756, pictured in June 2016

Overview
- Termini: Batovo railway station; Korolevo railway station

Service
- Type: freight and passenger
- Operator: Lviv Railways (branch of Ukrainian Railways)

History
- Opened: 24 October 1872

Technical
- Track length: 68 km (42 mi)
- Track gauge: 1,435 mm (4 ft 8 1/2 in); 1,520 mm (4 ft 11 27/32 in)
- Electrification: not available

The Batovo–Korolevo railway (Note: Ukrainian: Залізнична лінія Батьово — Королево, romanized: Zaliznycja linija Batjovo – Korolevo. Czech: Železniční trať Baťovo – Korolevo. German: Bahnstrecke Batjowo–Korolewo.) is one of the main railway lines in Ukraine. It runs between the towns of Batovo and Korolevo in Zakarpattia Oblast. The line is 68 km long. The single-track, non-electrified line has a four-rail track. The track gauge ranges from 1435 mm (standard/European gauge) to 1520 mm. The line is operated by the Lviv Railways, a branch of Ukrainian Railways.

When the 1435 mm track of the Batovo–Korolevo railway is combined with the preceding sections between Chop and Batovo and the succeeding section between Korolevo and Nevetlenfolu (Diakove), this is the longest standard-gauge railway in Ukraine with 103 km, ahead of the Chełm–Kovel railway in Volyn Oblast (65 km of which is located in Ukraine). Closely connected is the Debrecen–Sighetu Marmației railway, with its termini in Hungary and Romania, c. 80 km of which runs through Ukraine via Nevetlenfolu (Diakove) and Korolevo through Teresva.

== History ==
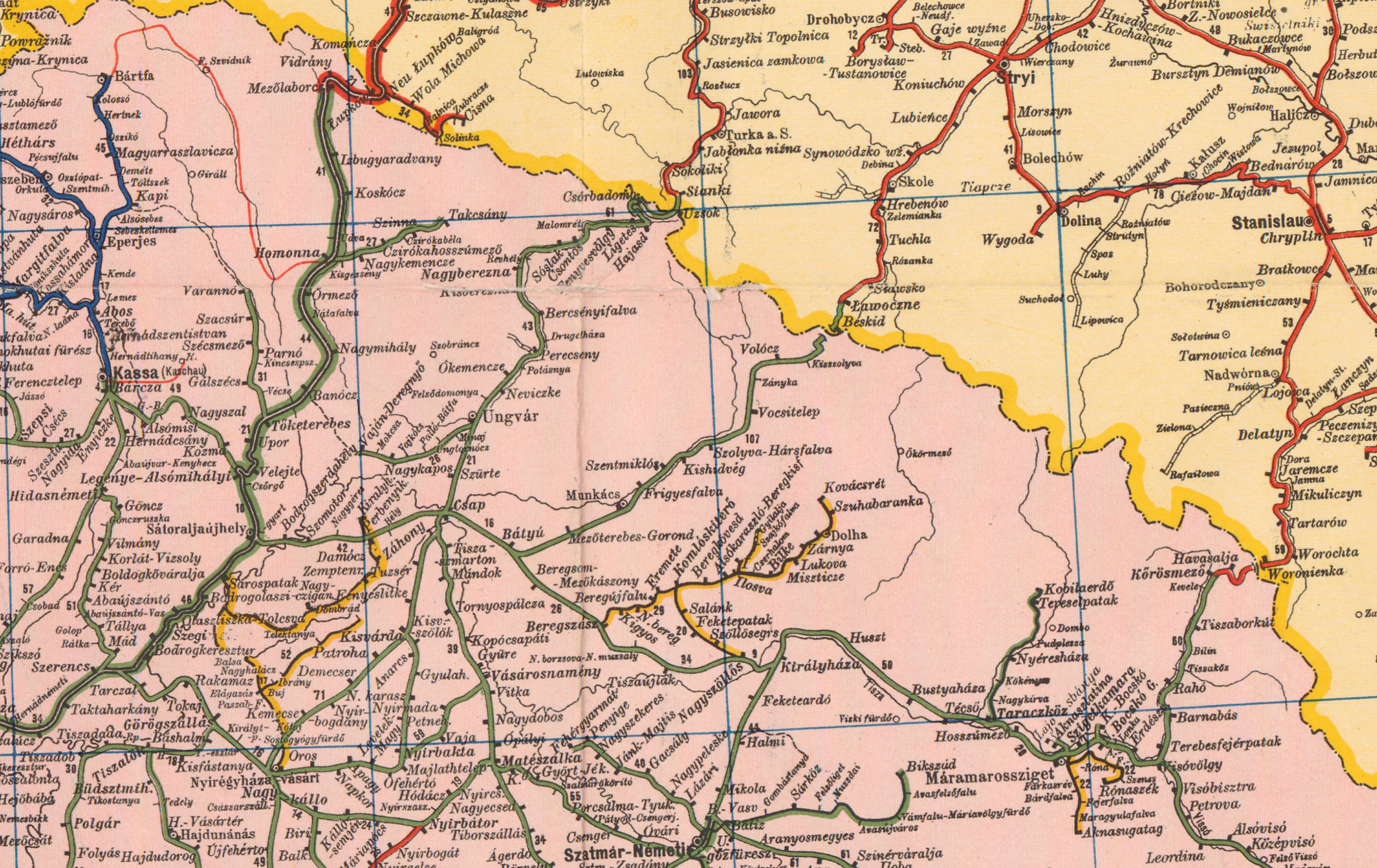
1918 map of Austro-Hungarian standard-gauge railways in modern Ukraine. (Note: Ungvár = Uzhhorod. Csap = Chop. Bátyú = Batovo. Munkács = Mukachevo. Beregszász = Berehove. Királyháza = Korolevo. Huszt = Khust. Taraszköz = Teresva. Máramarossziget = Sighetu Marmației.) Austrian Galicia Transleithania (Hungary)

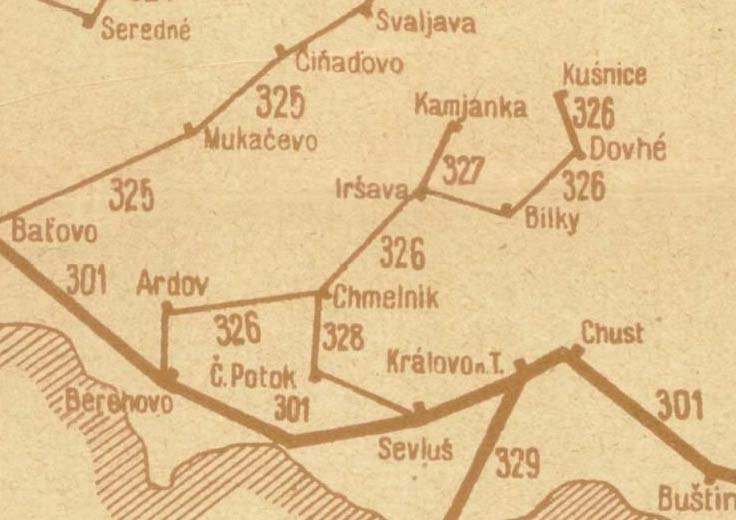
The Batovo–Korolevo (Note: Královo.) railway on a 1938 Czechoslovak State Railways map in Czech

The Batovo–Korolevo railway line opened on 24 October 1872, mostly in the former Hungarian county of Ung of the Lands of the Crown of Saint Stephen (Transleithania) of Austria–Hungary. The line forms part of the 243.1-kilometre-long railway route from Szerencs in northeastern modern Hungary to Sighetu Marmației in northwestern present-day Romania. From 1890 until the end of the First World War, the line was operated by the Hungarian Northeastern Railway (MÉKV). It then came under the control of the Czechoslovak State Railways from 1918 to 1939. The route is numbered 277 (Košice–Yasinya–Stanislav).

Following the occupation of Transcarpathia by Hungary in 1939, the railway once again came under the control of the Hungarian State Railways.

Following the end of the Second World War in 1945, Transcarpathia was incorporated into the Soviet Union as part of the Ukrainian SSR. Consequently, the Batovo–Korolevo railway line came under the control of the Lviv Railways branch of the Soviet Railways. At the same time, the track gauge was increased from standard (1,435 mm) to broad gauge (1,520 mm). To avoid disrupting freight transport, the track between Batovo and Korolevo was converted to a four-rail system.

In 1991 Ukraine declared its independence. Since then, the Batovo–Korolevo line has been operated by Ukrainian Railways, while it continued to be managed by the Lviv Railways branch.

Unlike many railway lines in Ukraine, the Batovo–Korolevo line is not electrified.

== Bibliography ==
- EC (11 July 2023). "Strategy for the EU integration of the Ukrainian and Moldovan rail systems". transport.ec.europa.eu. European Commission. (160 pages).
- Geschichte der Eisenbahnen der österreichisch-ungarischen Monarchie [History of the Railways of the Austro-Hungarian Monarchy]. Redaktion Hermann Strach, Vienna, Budapest 1898 ff., a multi-volume standard work of its time. (in German)
