= Debrecen–Sighetu Marmației railway =

Railway line in Hungary, Romania and Ukraine

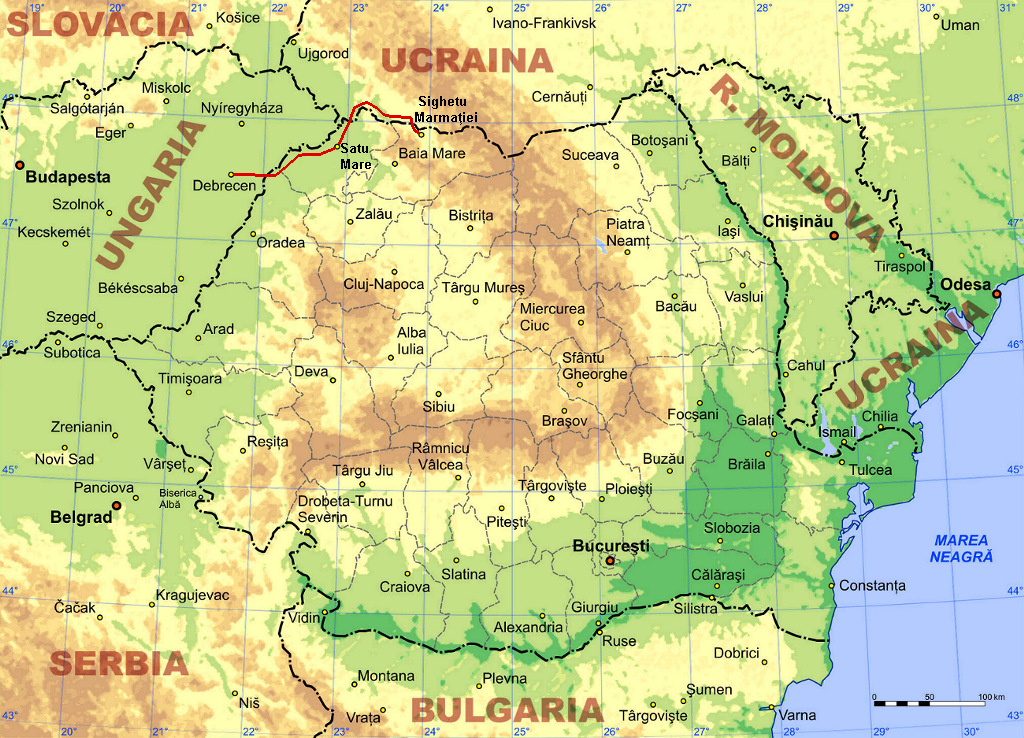
Map

The Debrecen–Sighetu Marmației railway (Note: German: Bahnstrecke Debrecen–Sighetu Marmației. Romanian: Calea ferată Debrețin–Sighetu Marmației. Ukrainian: Залізнична лінія Дебрецен — Сигіт, romanized: Zaliznychnja linija Debrecen – Syhit.) is a railway line in Hungary, Romania and Ukraine. It runs through the north-east of the Great Hungarian Plain and through the valley of the Tisza River in the Inner Eastern Carpathian Mountains.

== History ==
During the construction of the railway line, the region was part of the Transleithanian territory of Hungary within the Habsburg Dual Monarchy.

In 1857, the railway line from Szolnok to Debrecen was opened by the Tisza Railway (Hungarian: Tiszavidéki Vasút; German: Theiss-Eisenbahn). As part of the development of Hungary’s transport infrastructure following the Austro-Hungarian Compromise of 1867, the Hungarian government also sought to extend railway lines to the country’s outlying regions; these regions included the counties of Szatmár and Máramaros.

In 1868, the Hungarian government awarded a concession for the construction of the line from Debrecen via Szatmárnémeti (now Satu Mare) to Máramarossziget (now Sighetu Marmației) to a consortium led by the German-Jewish entrepreneur Bethel Henry Strousberg. The company set to work straight away. In 1870, Strousberg had the opportunity to sell the concession at a profit to a banking consortium led by the Union-Bank in Vienna.

The line was opened in several sections, from west to east:

- Debrecen–Nagykároly (modern Carei) on 5 June 1871
- Nagykároly–Szatmárnémeti (modern Satu Mare) on 25 September 1871
- Szatmárnémeti–Bustyaháza (modern Bushtyno) on 16 June 1872
- Bustyaháza–Máramaros-Sziget (modern Sighetu Marmației) on 4 December 1872

Operations were taken over by the private railway company of the Hungarian Northeastern Railway (MÉKV), a key figure (and, until 1875, deputy director) of which was the future Hungarian Prime Minister Kálmán Tisza.

In 1890, the Hungarian North-Eastern Railway – and with it the line described here – was nationalised and taken over by the state railway company MÁV.

During the First World War, the railway line was of great strategic importance, as it was used to transport large numbers of military supplies to the Eastern Front, which ran through the Carpathians.

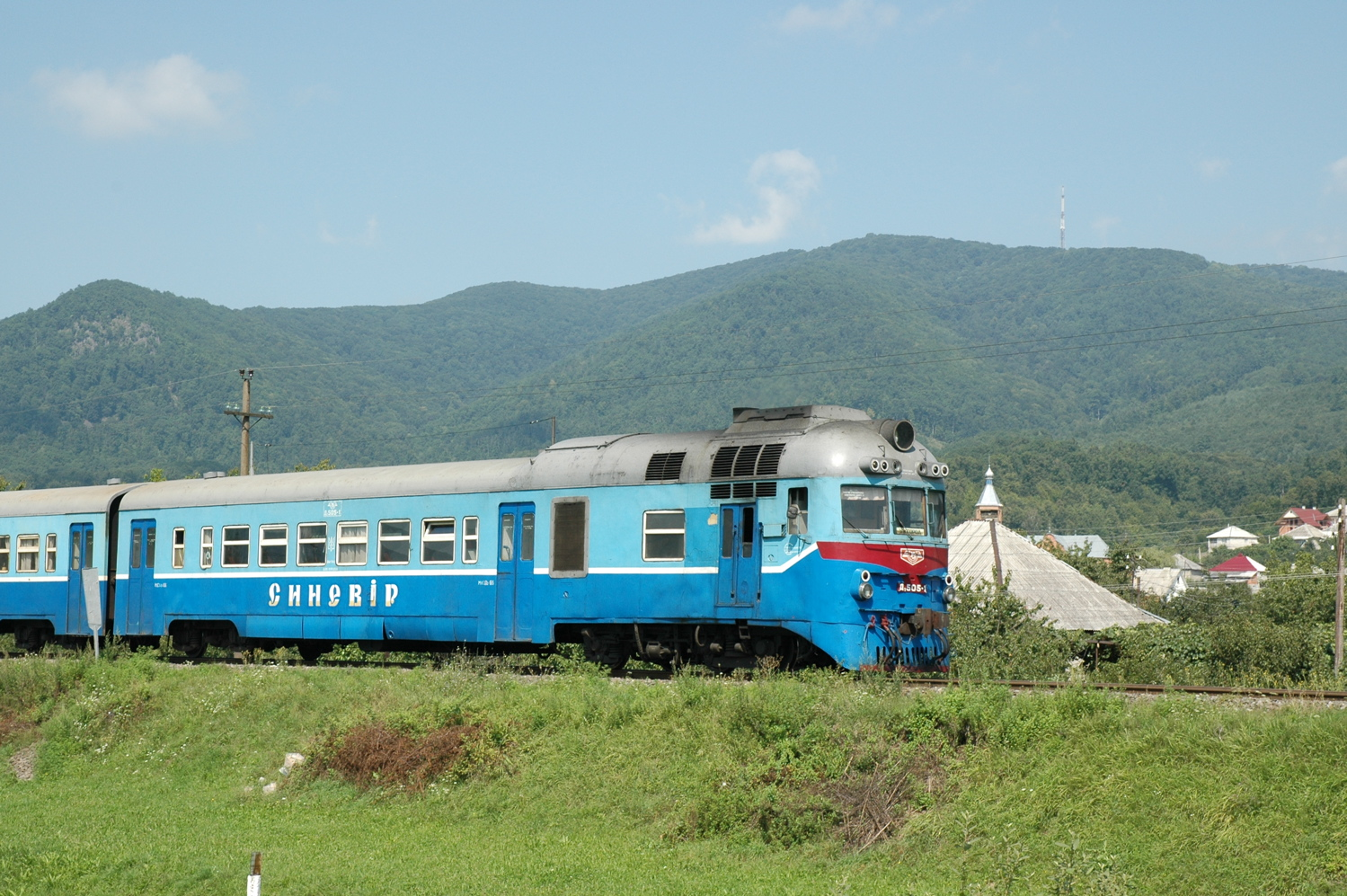
Ukrainian diesel multiple unit near Khust (2006)

In the decades that followed, the line experienced an eventful history due to frequent border revisions. Firstly, at the end of the First World War, the Austro-Hungarian Empire collapsed. The railway line was divided into four sections: the western section – i.e. the stretch from Debrecen to Nyírábrány – remained part of Hungary, whilst the section from Carei to Halmeu became part of Romania. The line then entered Czechoslovak territory at Diakove, before returning to Romania between Teresva and Câmpulung la Tisa.

In the First Vienna Award of 1938, Hungary was awarded Carpatho-Ukraine by Czechoslovakia. The railway line thus crossed the Hungarian–Romanian border three times. In 1940, under the Second Vienna Award, Romania was required, amongst other things, to cede the region around Satu Mare and its part of the Maramureș to Hungary, meaning that the entire railway line came under Hungarian control once again for a few years. After the end of the Second World War, the victorious powers restored the pre-1938 borders – with the difference that this time, Carpatho-Ukraine fell not to Czechoslovakia but to the Soviet Union.

The Soviet state railway company SŽD converted the tracks on its territory from standard gauge to broad gauge (1520 mm). This also affected the section between Câmpulung la Tisa and Sighetu Marmației, which at that time had no connection to the rest of the Romanian rail network. This changed in 1949 with the construction of the Salva–Vișeu de Jos railway line, however, it was not until the early 1990s that a four-gauge track for 1520 mm and 1435 mm was built between Câmpulung la Tisa and Sighetu Marmației. The section from Porumbești to Korolevo is also four-rail; here, and onwards to Chop on the Ukrainian–Slovak border, standard-gauge trains can therefore also operate. There is a variable gauge in Porumbești.

With the disintegration of the Soviet Union and the Declaration of Independence of Ukraine in 1991, the section of the railway line that had previously been under Soviet control passed to Ukraine and is now operated by the state railway company Ukrzaliznytsia.

== Current situation ==
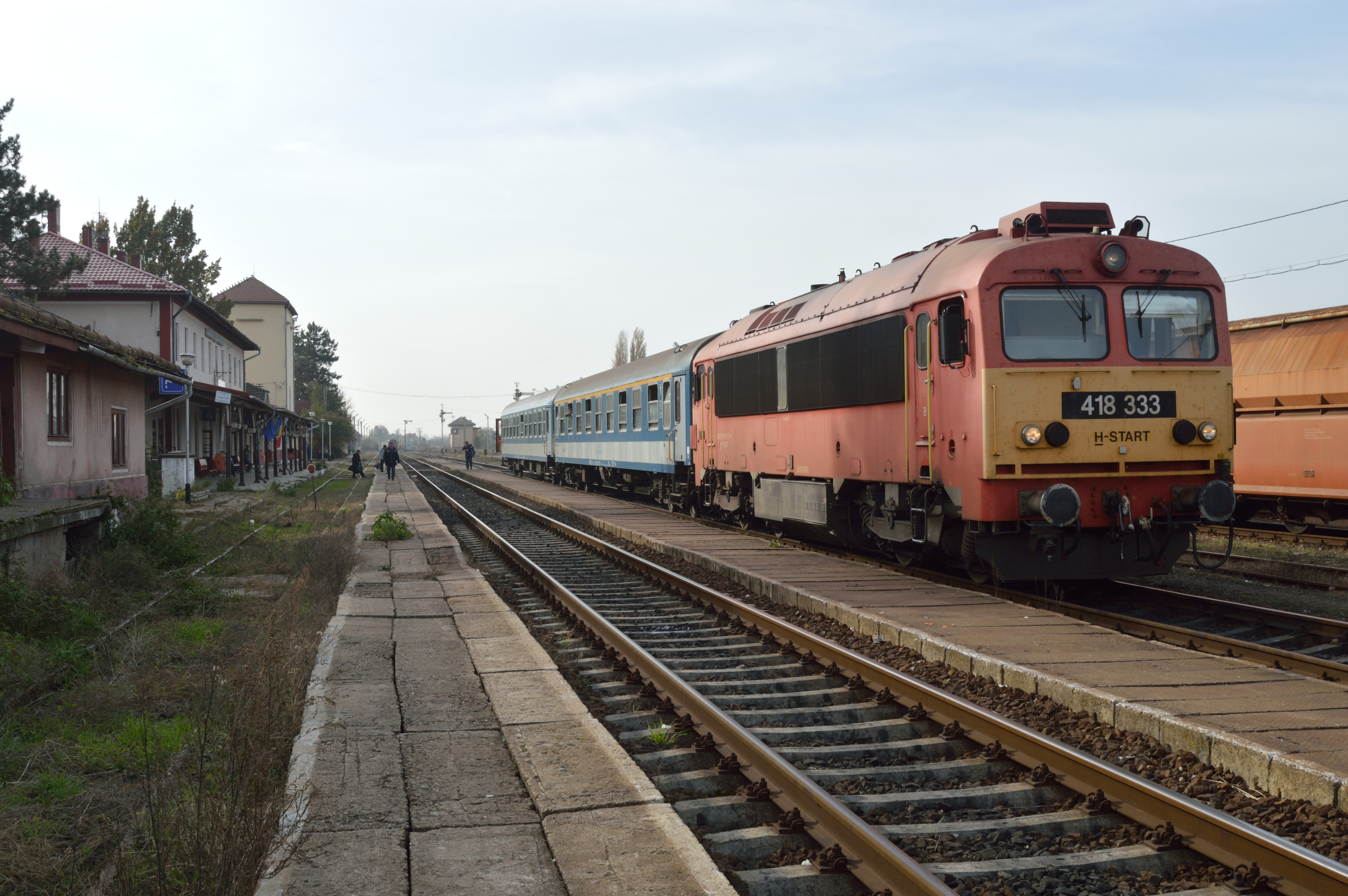
A MÁV passenger train from Debrecen at the Valea lui Mihai border station (2014)

The line is single-track and not electrified. On the Hungarian section from Debrecen to Nyírábrány, around ten passenger trains run each day in each direction, three of which continue on to Romania as cross-border services. The Romanian sections from Carei to Satu Mare and from Satu Mare to Halmeu are served daily in each direction by around seven to ten passenger trains (mainly local services). By contrast, there was no passenger service on the cross-border routes from Halmeu to Nevetlenfolu (Diakove) and from Teresva to Câmpulung la Tisa in the 2022 timetable year, although the resumption of these services is under discussion. In Ukraine, only a few passenger trains run between Nevetlenfolu and Korolevo; the section from Korolevo to Teresva is slightly busier.

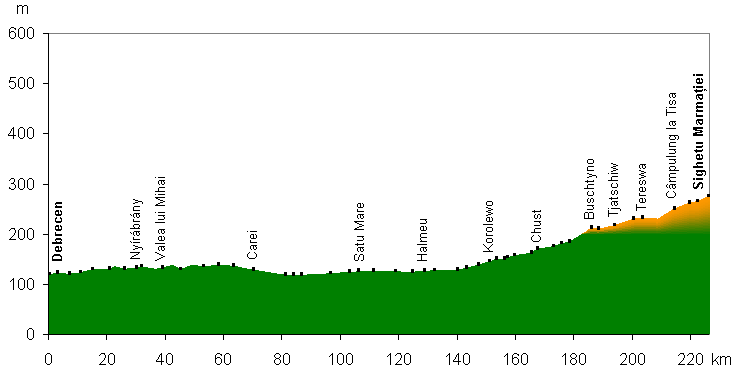
Elevation profile of the Debrecen–Sighetu Marmației railway

== Literature ==
- Josef Gonda u. a. (1898). "Das Eisenbahnwesen in Ungarn seit 1867" [Railways in Hungary since 1867]. Geschichte der Eisenbahnen der Oesterreichisch-Ungarischen Monarchie [History of the Railways of the Austro-Hungarian Monarchy] (in German). Vol. 3. Vienna / Teschen / Leipzig: Karl Prochaska. pp. 355–562.
