= Beskydy Tunnel =

Railway tunnel in the Carpathians, Ukraine

Coordinates: 48°45′39″N 23°19′27″E

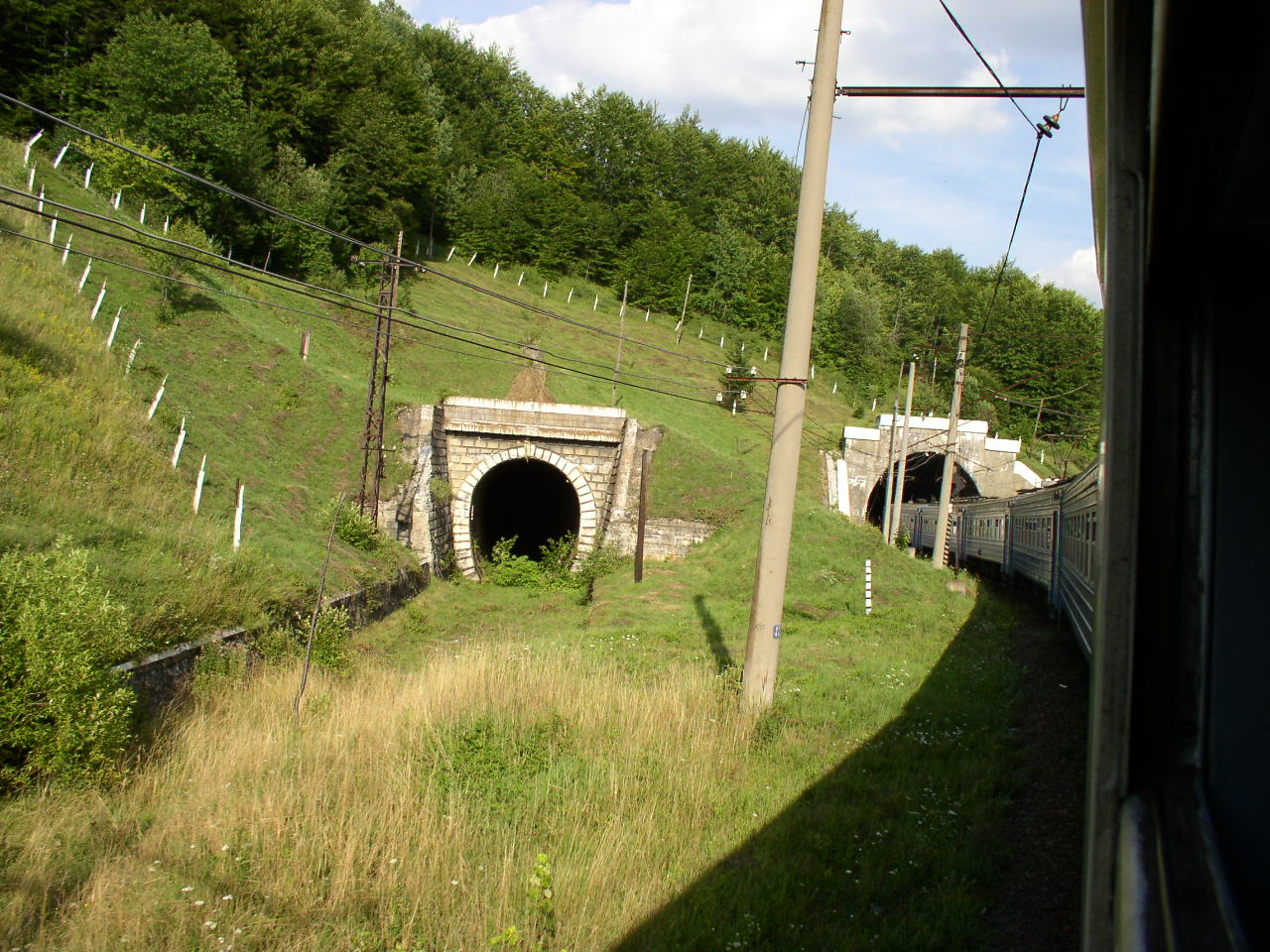
- Two portals with the old one overgrown

- Location within Ukraine

Overview
- Status: Active
- Crosses: Carpathian Mountains

Operation
- Opened: 1886 (old tunnel); 2018 (new tunnel)

Technical
- Line length: 1,822 m (5,978 ft) (new tunnel) 1,750 m (5,740 ft) (old tunnel)
- Track gauge: 1,520 mm (4 ft 11 27/32 in)

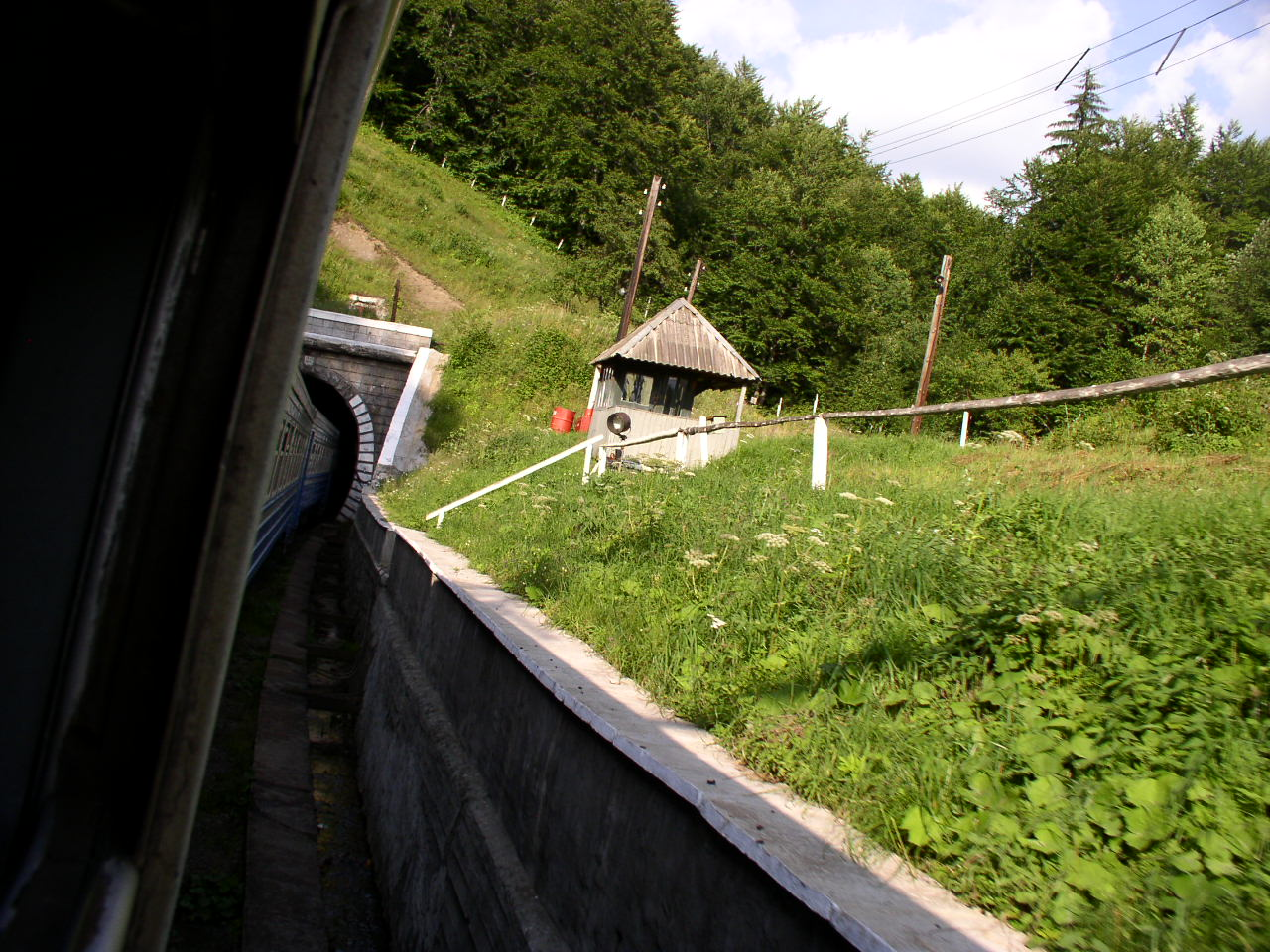
South portal of the old tunnel

The Beskydy Tunnel (Ukrainian: Бескидський тунель) is a railway tunnel of the Lviv Railways between the towns of Beskid and Skotarske and passes through the Carpathian Mountains under the Volovets Pass. As the second-longest tunnel in the Ukrainian rail network, it is part of Europe's Corridor V (Italy-Slovenia-Hungary-Slovakia-Ukraine), thus linking Lviv in western Ukraine to cities such as Venice and Trieste in northern Italy, as well as various other locations along the route in Slovenia and Hungary.

== History ==
The first Beskydy Tunnel, built in 1886, was 1,750 m (5,740 ft) long, and 1435 mm wide as a European standard-gauge railway. After the Second World War, the Soviet Union took control, and converted it to 1524 mm broad-gauge track, in the 1970s to 1520 mm. In time, its capacity no longer met increasing demand, thus it was decided to make a new bore parallel to the existing one. Discussions began in 1998 and construction started in 2014, using the New Austrian Tunneling Method. Breakthrough was achieved in January 2016 and it was inaugurated in a ceremony by Ukrainian President Petro Poroshenko in late May 2018.

The new tunnel has a length of 1,822 m and is covered by up to 180 m of rock. The internal dimensions of 8.5 m height and 10.5 m width allows for a double track railway to be accommodated. The two tubes are connected by three lugs, while the old tunnel is being used as a rescue route for the new one.

The maximum speed was increased from 40 km/h to 70 km/h. As a result, the tunnel can now handle 50 to 100 trains daily, nearly 60% of all rail traffic between Ukraine and the European Union, and it will reduce journey times between Lviv and Ukrainian border town Chop, in a bid to facilitate exports of domestic products to neighbouring countries.

The project was financed by the European Bank for Reconstruction and Development (EBRD) and the European Investment Bank (EIB); the EBRD invested $40 million, while the EIB contributed €55 million ($64.5 million) for construction. In addition to providing financing, technical expertise was bought in from the EU, especially from Austria, to support the development of the tunnel. The construction process reportedly required 130,000 tonnes of concrete and 8,000 tonnes of steel.

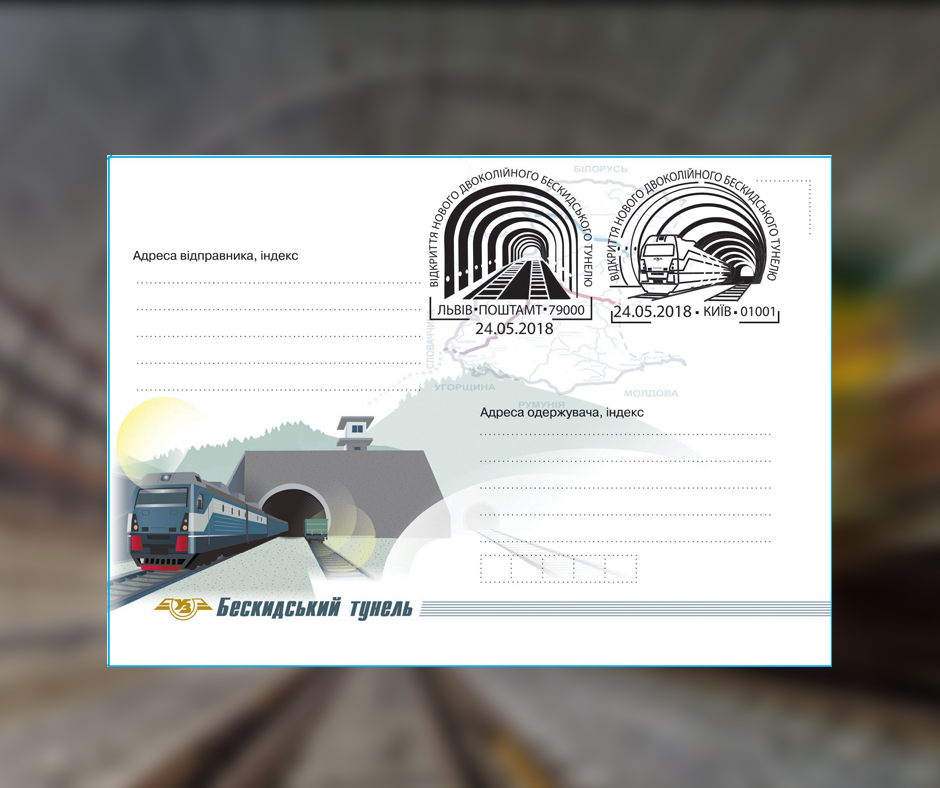
Postage stamp of Ukraine, 2018

=== 2022 Russian attack ===
On the night of 1-2 June 2022, Russia targeted a section of the tunnel with at least two Kalibr cruise missiles to disrupt weapon and fuel supplies from the West to Ukraine during the 2022 Russian invasion of Ukraine. The attack was confirmed by governor of Lviv Oblast Maksym Kozytskyy.
