= Batovo, Ukraine =

Rural locality in Zakarpattia Oblast, Ukraine

Batovo Батьово Bátyú
- Rural settlement
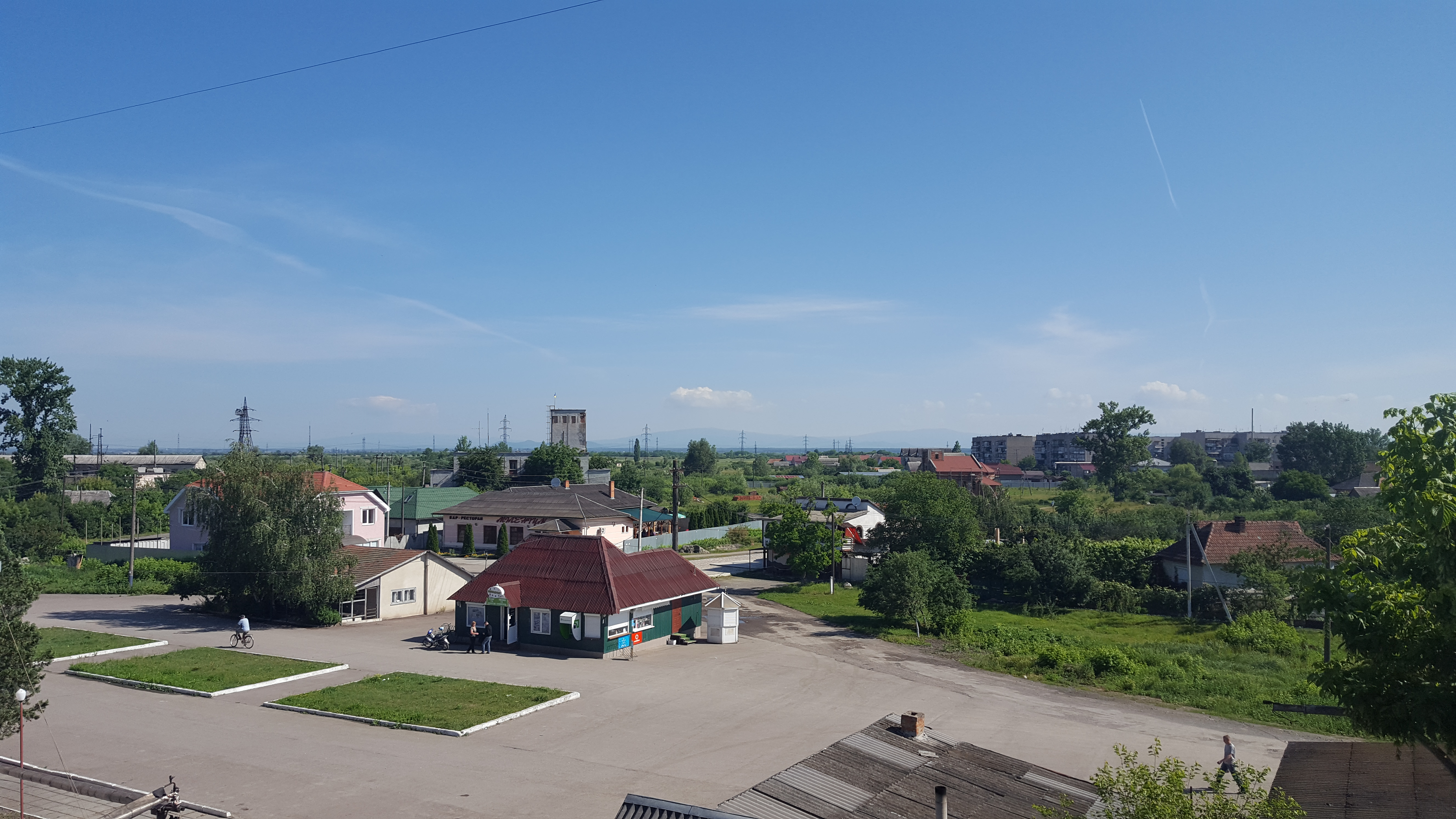
- Commercial and residential buildings in the center of Batovo

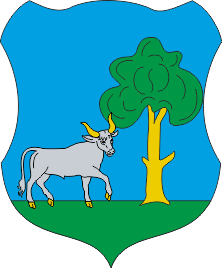
- Coat of arms

- Location of Batovo in Zakarpattia Oblast Batovo (Ukraine)
- Coordinates: 48°21′43″N 22°23′24″E
- Country: Ukraine
- Oblast: Zakarpattia Oblast
- Raion: Berehove Raion
- Hromada: Batovo settlement hromada
- First mentioned: 1205
- Town status: 1971

Government
  - Town Head: Ferenc Beregszászi

Area
  - Total: 5 km^{2} (1.9 sq mi)
- Elevation: 105 m (344 ft)

Population (2022)
  - Total: 2,914 ▼
  - Density: 580/km^{2} (1,500/sq mi)
- Time zone: UTC+2 (EET)
  - Summer (DST): UTC+3 (EEST)
- Postal code: 90212
- Area code: +380 3141
- Website: http://rada.gov.ua/

Batovo (Ukrainian: Батьово; Hungarian: Bátyú; Slovak: Baťovo) is a rural settlement in Berehove Raion, Zakarpattia Oblast, western Ukraine. Population: 2,914 (2022 estimate). The Batovo–Korolevo railway is an important transport connection for the whole region.

== Geography ==
The Uzhhorod—Solotvyno railroad line runs through Batovo, with a station located in the town that serves as a border control between Ukraine with Hungary. The railway in Batovo is the largest employer for the town's residents.

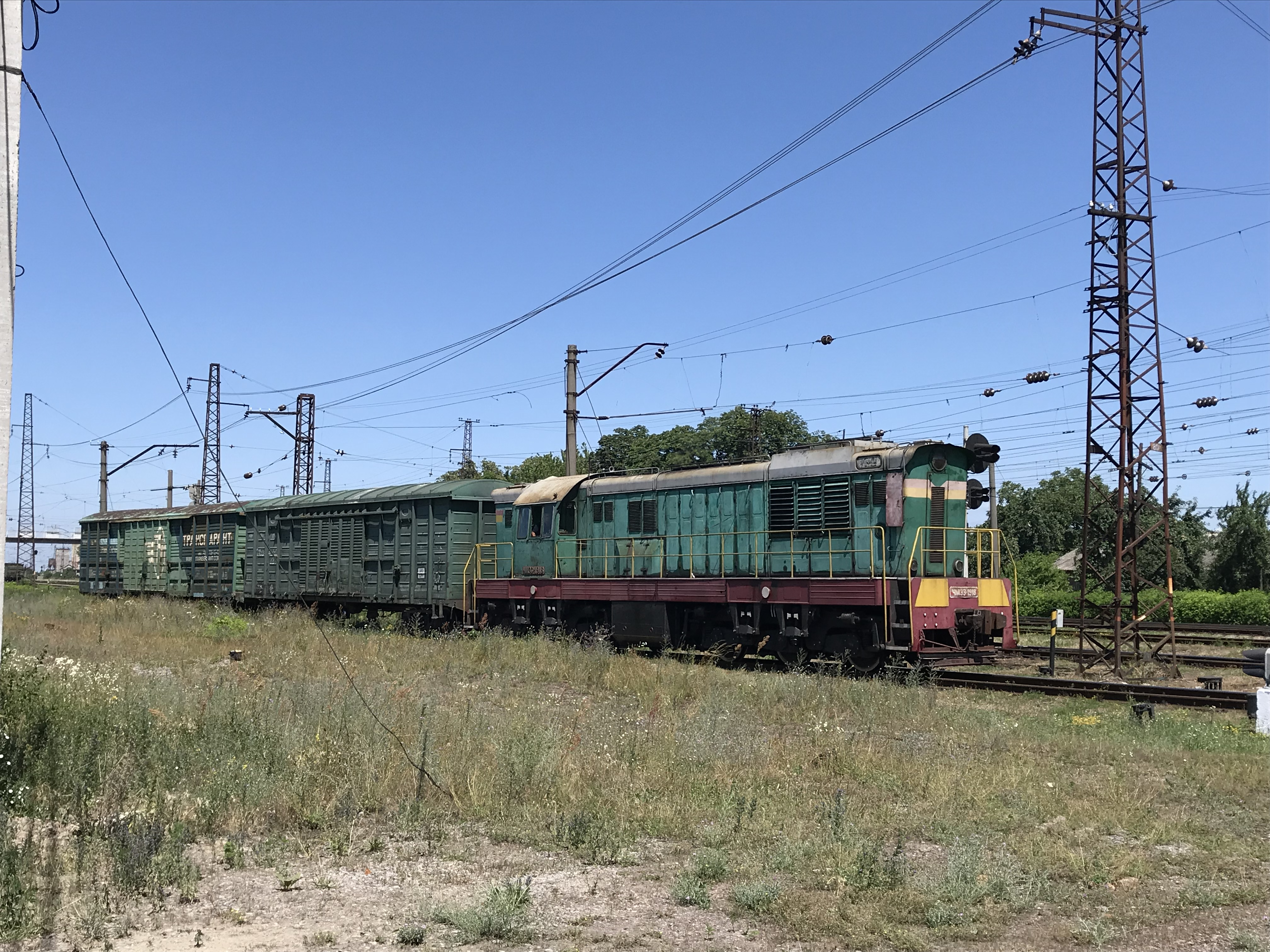
A ChME3 locomotive leaving the rail yard of Batovo

== History ==
The place was first mentioned in 1205 as Bátyú (Ukrainian: Батьу). During that time, the settlement was located on the banks of the Tisza river, however, frequent floods forced the town's residents to relocate to a further location from the river's banks. In 1816, Batovo had a total of 310 residents and 54 houses. In 1910, the settlement was part of the Kingdom of Hungary and had a total of 1,490 inhabitants, the majority of which were Hungarians. In 1921, the local arm of the Communist Party of Czechoslovakia was established in Batovo.

During World War II, about 40 families from the town were sent to Nazi concentration camps and an additional 90 people were sent to do forced labor. Batovo became part of the Soviet Union after WWII. In Autumn of 1944, 140 residents were taken prisoner by Soviet forces. In 1946, the settlement's name was changed to Vuzlove (Ukrainian: Вузлове) or Uzlovoe (Russian: Узловое), which it kept until it was renamed back to "Batovo" on April 1, 1995.

In 1971, the settlement was granted the status of an urban-type settlement. In 2001, Batovo survived a large flood from the Tisza largely in part thanks to the railway line's embankment which stopped the coming waters.

On 26 January 2024, a new law entered into force which abolished the status of urban-type settlement, and Batovo became a rural settlement.

== Demographics ==
The town's population was 3,046 as of the 2001 Ukrainian Census and 3,046 in 2011. Two-thirds of the town's population consists of ethnic Hungarians, with the remaining population consisting of Ukrainians and Russians.

== Attractions ==
The town houses a couple of attractions, including the Reformed Church, which was originally built in 1910, but rebuilt in 1988, and renovated in 2003; as well as the Lónyay Estate, which was nationalized during the Soviet times.

== See also ==
- Hungarians in Ukraine
