= Porumbești, Cantemir =

Porumbești
- Village
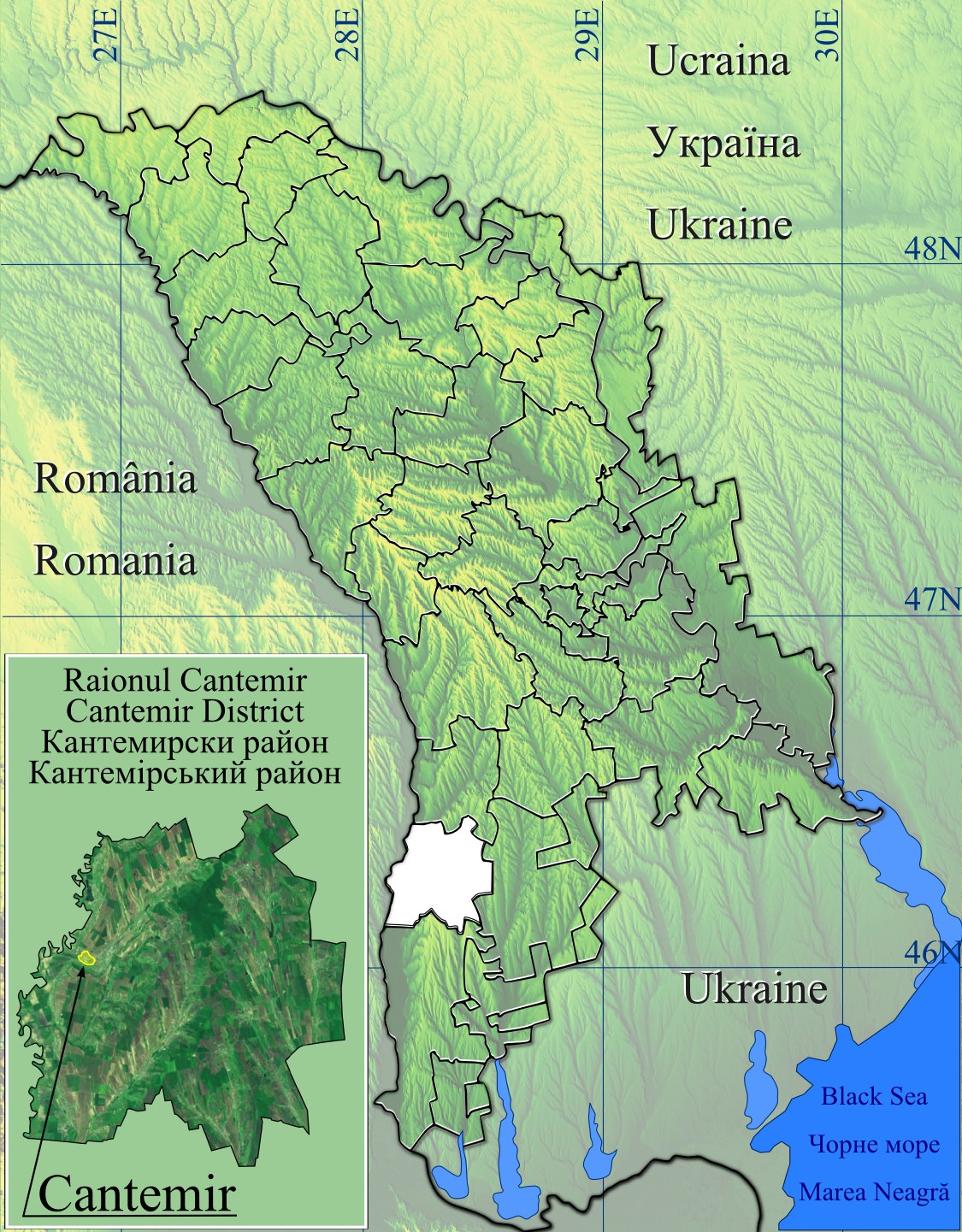
- Location within Cantemir
- Coordinates: 46°19′22″N 28°16′32″E
- Country: Moldova
- District: Cantemir District

Government
  - Mayor: Tudor Munteanu (PLDM)
- Elevation: 58 m (190 ft)

Population (2014 census)
  - Total: 1,405
- Time zone: UTC+2 (EET)
  - Summer (DST): UTC+3 (EEST)
- Postal code: MD-7332

Porumbești is a village in Cantemir District, Moldova.

== Demographics ==
In the 2014 census the total population of the town was 1405 inhabitants.
