= Volovets Pass =

- Воловецький перевал
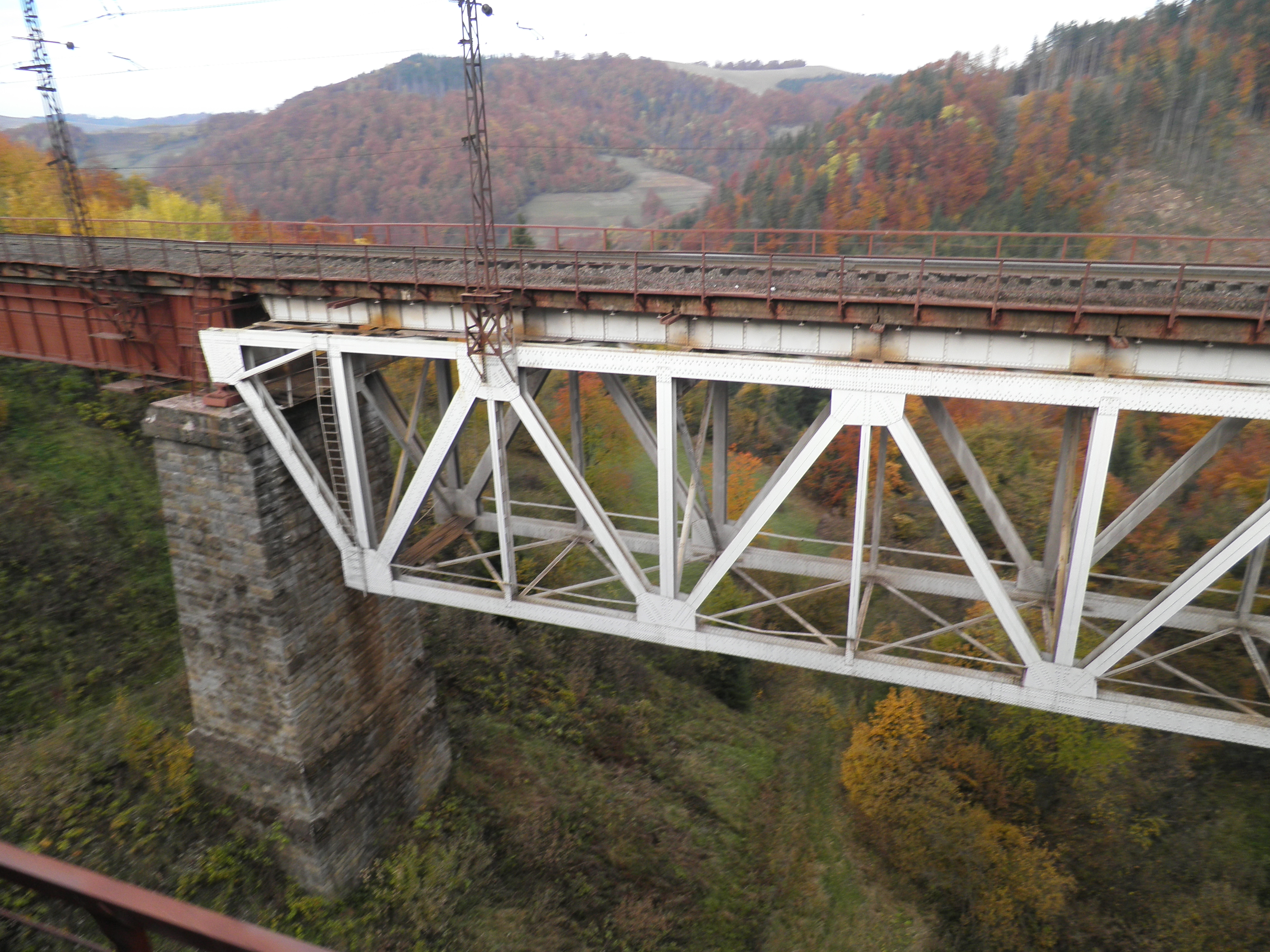
- View of Volovets Pass

- Location within Ukraine
- Elevation: 1,014 m (3,327 ft)
- Traversed by: Rail in tunnel (and road)

Location
- Location: Ukraine, on the border of Stryi Raion and Volovets Raion
- Range: Carpathians
- Coordinates: 48°45′29″N 23°18′53″E

Volovets Pass (Ukrainian: Воловецький перевал; Hungarian: Kisszolyvai-hágó) is a mountain pass in the north-eastern Carpathian Mountains of Ukraine crossing the drainage divide. Its crest is at 1,014 metres (3,327 ft) height. It is located on the border of Stryi Raion of the Lviv Oblast and the Volovets Raion of the Zakarpattia Oblast, on the watershed of the rivers Opir and Vycha.

The southern slope of the pass is steep, while the northern flank is declivous. It consists of sandstones and slates. Volovets Pass is sparsely populated, with meadows dominating the landscape. Below the mountain pass there is a system of railway tunnels connecting Mukachevo and Stryj.

Automobile traffic across the pass is impossible since the road is too difficult to traverse. The nearest settlements are Oporets and Skotarske.

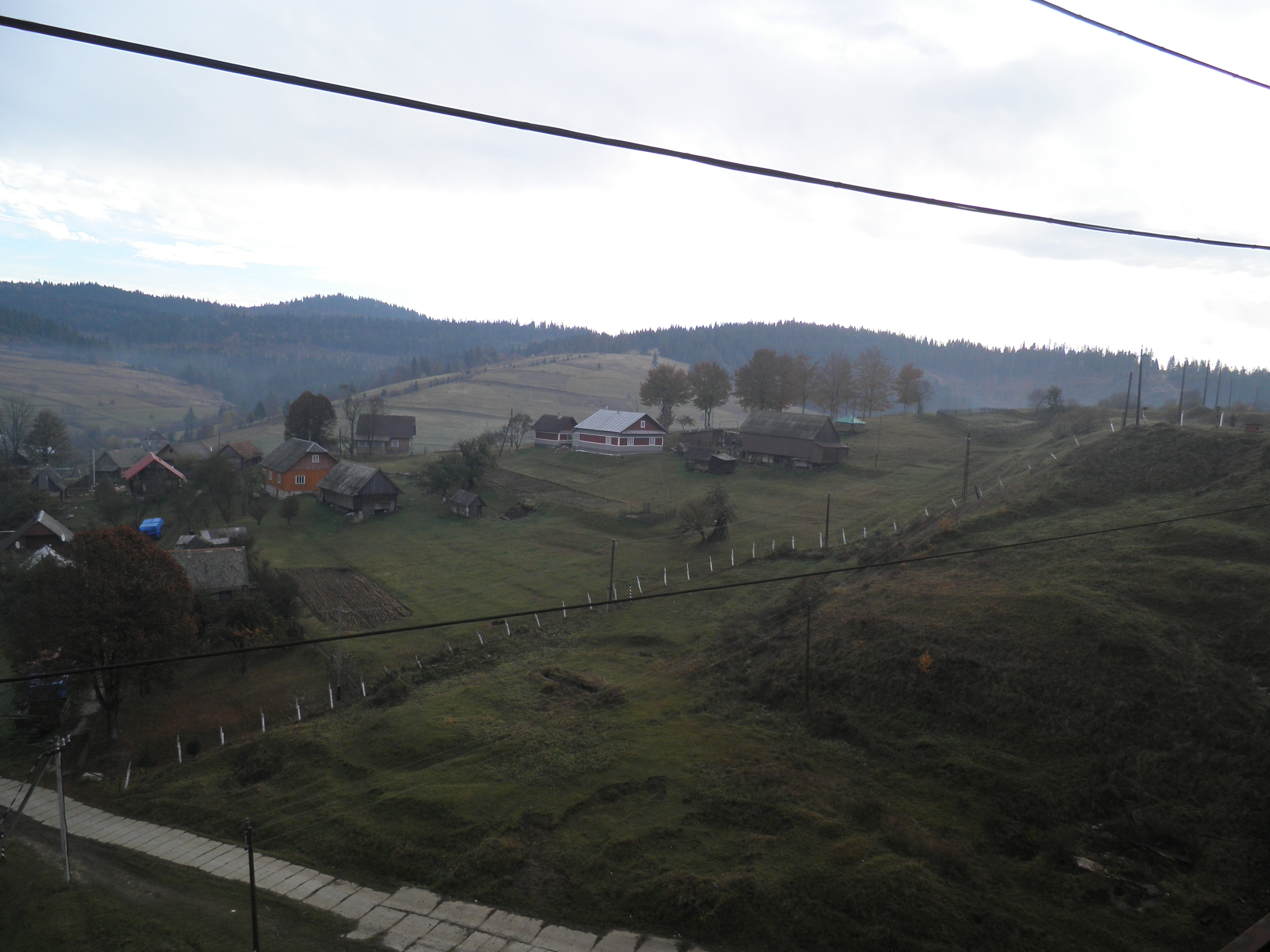
The pass from the northern slope (in the southern part of Lviv Oblast)

== See also ==
- Beskydy Tunnel
