= E-kvytok =

- Website type: Metasearch engine
- Available in: Ukrainian, Russian, English
- Headquarters: Kyiv, Ukraine
- Owner: AT "Ukrainian Railways" JSC
- Website: e-kvytok.kiev.ua
- Commercial: Yes
- Registration: Yes
- Launched: 30 March 2009; 17 years ago

E-kvytok (translate Electronic ticket)—is the first online operator in Ukraine that made it possible to purchase train tickets. It was created by the state enterprise AT "Ukrainian Railways" JSC.

== History ==
2009—at the end of March, at the Ministry of Infrastructure of Ukraine, it was announced the creation of the first in Ukraine online service for selling train tickets, based on the sovereign AT "Ukrainian Railways" JSC.

2009 – 71 thousand passengers used the E-kvytok service for the year.

2010—ticket sales through the E-kvytok service increased by 40%, about 140 thousand tickets.

2011—the Ministry of Infrastructure of Ukraine to popularize online ticketing, leveled up the prices at the box office of Ukrainian Railways JSC and on the E-kvytok service.

2013—for the first time in Ukraine, the opportunity is available to print an E-kvytok on a regular printer at home and present it when boarding a train, without visiting the ticket office.

== Service Features ==
On the site, you can buy a ticket online without additional commissions and fees. You choose the direction, class of car, and place. The search engine of the service selects offers by price and direction in one or both directions. You can book a ticket without leaving your home. Payment is made by bank card, payment systems such as Visa and MasterCard.

== Reservation system ==
An information system containing information on the full list of services available for booking on the site (including: flight schedules, transportation rates, categories, and characteristics of vehicles, availability of seats, tariffs of service providers, rules for their use). Information in the reservation system is posted on the site in accordance with how it is presented in the global reservation system (GDS), reservation systems of the service provider, or their authorized representatives.

== Licenses and certificates ==
- Certificate Payment Card Industry Data Security Standard (PCI DSS)
- SSL Certificate 256 bit GoDaddy
