= Korolevo =

Rural locality in Zakarpattia Oblast, Ukraine

Korolevo Королево
- Rural settlement
- Interactive map of Korolevo
- Location within Zakarpattia Oblast Location within Ukraine
- Coordinates: 48.15°N 23.1333°E
- Country: Ukraine
- Oblast: Zakarpattia Oblast
- Raion: Berehove Raion
- Hromada: Korolevo settlement hromada
- Time zone: UTC+2 (EET)
  - Summer (DST): UTC+3 (EEST)

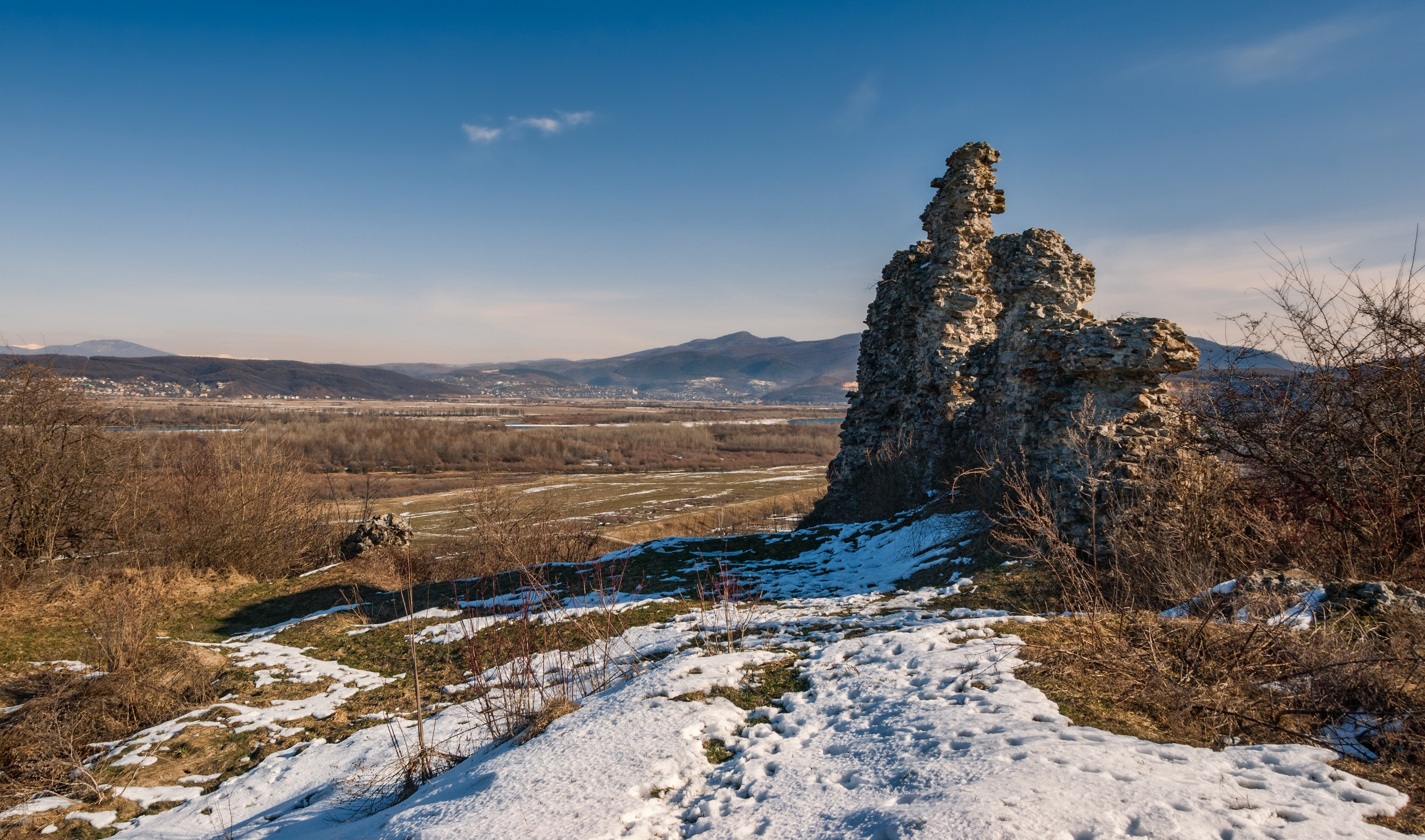
Ruins of the castle in Korolevo

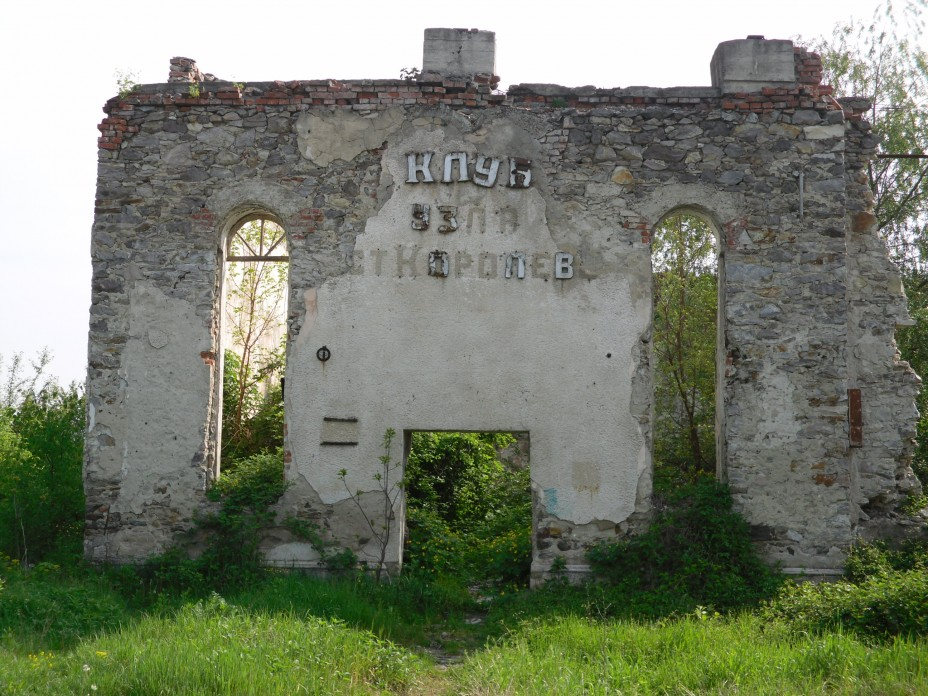
Ruins of former synagogue

Korolevo (Ukrainian: Королево; Slovak: Kráľovec nad Tisou; Hungarian: Királyháza; Romanian: Craia) is a rural settlement on the Tisza River in Berehove Raion, Zakarpattia Oblast, Ukraine. Population: 10,385 (2022 estimate). The Batovo–Korolevo railway is an important transport connection for the whole region.

== History ==
During the reign of Saint Stephen, King of Hungary, a German settlement existed on the site. A royal hunting lodge was built on the hill, and the town was named for it: Királyháza, its original Hungarian name that was later translated to the Slavic Korolev, literally means "king's house". In the 14th century a stone castle named Nyalab was built on the site of the hunting lodge. In 1672 the castle was destroyed.

In 1910, the village in Ugocsa County of the Kingdom of Hungary had 3,167 inhabitants, of whom 2,224 were Hungarians and 932 Ruthenians. In 1918 it joined the then newly formed Czechoslovakia (as part of Subcarpathian Ruthenia) and was known as Kráľovo nad Tisou during that time. In 1944, close to the end of World War II, it ended up in the Ukrainian SSR, then part of the USSR. In 1947 the village was given the status of an urban-type settlement. Since 1991 it has been in independent Ukraine.

On 26 January 2024, a new law entered into force which abolished the status of urban-type settlement, and Korolevo became a rural settlement.
