= Nevetlenfolu =

Nevetlenfolu Неветленфолу
- Village
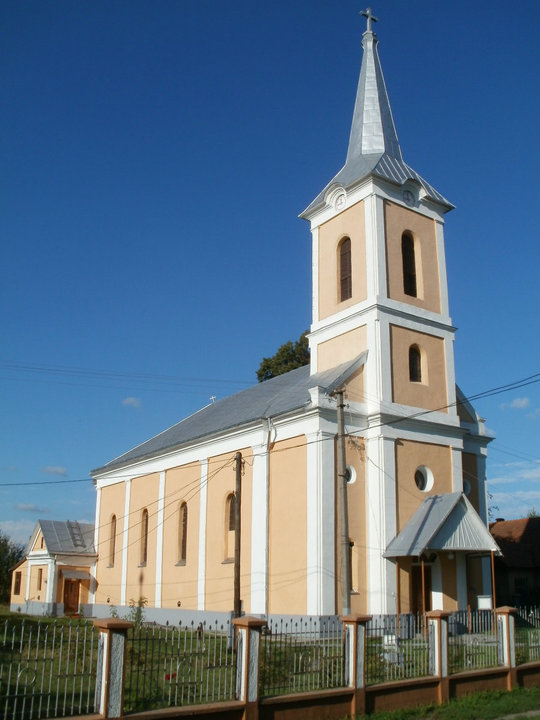
- Catholic church in 2012
- Interactive map of Nevetlenfolu
- Location of Nevetlenfolu within Ukraine Nevetlenfolu (Zakarpattia Oblast)
- Coordinates: 48°00′58″N 22°59′45″E
- Country: Ukraine
- Oblast: Zakarpattia Oblast
- Raion: Berehove Raion
- Founded: 1500

Area
  - Total: 4.951 km^{2} (1.912 sq mi)
- Elevation: 124 m (407 ft)

Population (2001 census)
  - Total: 1,632
  - Density: 329.6/km^{2} (853.7/sq mi)
- Time zone: UTC+2 (EET)
  - Summer (DST): UTC+3 (EEST)
- Postal code: 90365
- Area code: +380 3141

Nevetlenfolu (Ukrainian: Неветленфолу, Hungarian: Nevetlenfalu, Rusyn: Неветленфолу) is a village in Berehove Raion (district; until 2020, Vynohradiv Raion) in Zakarpattia Oblast of Ukraine as one of its western regions.

Its name in Hungarian language literally means "no-name village". Earlier it was known as Gyakfalva, however it was changed in the 17th century because the first part of the name "gyak" meant sexual intercourse (in Hungarian) and was considered offensive (note, in Slavic languages "dyak" means a secretary/clerk; its Hungarian cognates are the obsolete deák, with the same meaning, and contemporary diák, meaning "student" – all of these from Greek διάκονος). After 1619 the village is mentioned as Nevetlenfalu in the records.

After 1920, the village became part of Czechoslovakia, however in 1938 it was returned to Hungary by the First Vienna Award, along with the southern part of Carpathian Ruthenia. Following the World War II in 1945 Nevetlenfolu became part of the Soviet Union as part of the "unification" of "Zakarpattia Ukraine" and after its breakup it belongs to Ukraine. In 1945–2000 it carried official name of Diakove. In 2000 the village was officially renamed adopting Ukrainian adaptation of Hungarian name, yet some local state institutions continue to carry name of "Diakove" such as local border checkpoint, train station, others.

The population of the village in 2001 was over 86% Hungarian-speaking.
