= LHS =

LHS may refer to:

== Schools ==
=== Australia ===
- Leumeah High School, Sydney
- Lyneham High School, Canberra
- Lurnea High School, Sydney

=== United Kingdom ===
- Larbert High School, Stenhousemuir, Scotland
- Litherland High School, Liverpool, England
- Loughborough High School, Loughborough, England

=== United States ===
- Lafayette High School (disambiguation)
- Lahainaluna High School, Maui, Hawai’i
- Lakeland High School (disambiguation)
- Lamar High School (disambiguation)
- Lanphier High School, Springfield, Illinois
- Lawrence High School (disambiguation)
- Lebanon High School (disambiguation)
- Lee High School (disambiguation)
- Legacy High School (disambiguation)
- Lejeune High School, Jacksonville, North Carolina
- Leominster High School, Leominster, Massachusetts
- Leonia High School, Leonia, New Jersey
- Lexington High School (disambiguation)
- Lincoln High School (disambiguation)
- Linganore High School, Frederick Co, Maryland
- Lightridge High School, Aldie, Virginia
- Liverpool High School, Liverpool, New York
- Longmeadow High School, Longmeadow, Massachusetts
- Lowell High School (disambiguation)
- Ludington High School, Ludington, Michigan
- Lufkin High School, Lufkin, Texas
- Lynnwood High School, Lynnwood, Washington
- Lynwood High School, Lynwood, California

=== Various countries ===
- Langley High School (disambiguation)

== Science and mathematics ==
- Latin hypercube sampling, in statistics
- Left-hand side, of an equation
- Luyten Half-Second catalogue, a 1979 work of astronomy

== Transportation ==
- Chrysler LHS, a luxury automobile of the 1990s
- LHS, hydraulic fluid formerly used in Citroën vehicles
- Limehouse station, London, National Rail station code LHS
- Linia Hutnicza Szerokotorowa, a broad gauge railway line in Poland
- M1120 HEMTT Load Handling System, a variant of heavy truck

== Other uses ==
- Left-hand side, a body-relative direction
- LHS Telekommunikation, a Swedish telecomms company
