= PKP class ST44 =

Soviet diesel-electric locomotive

ST44
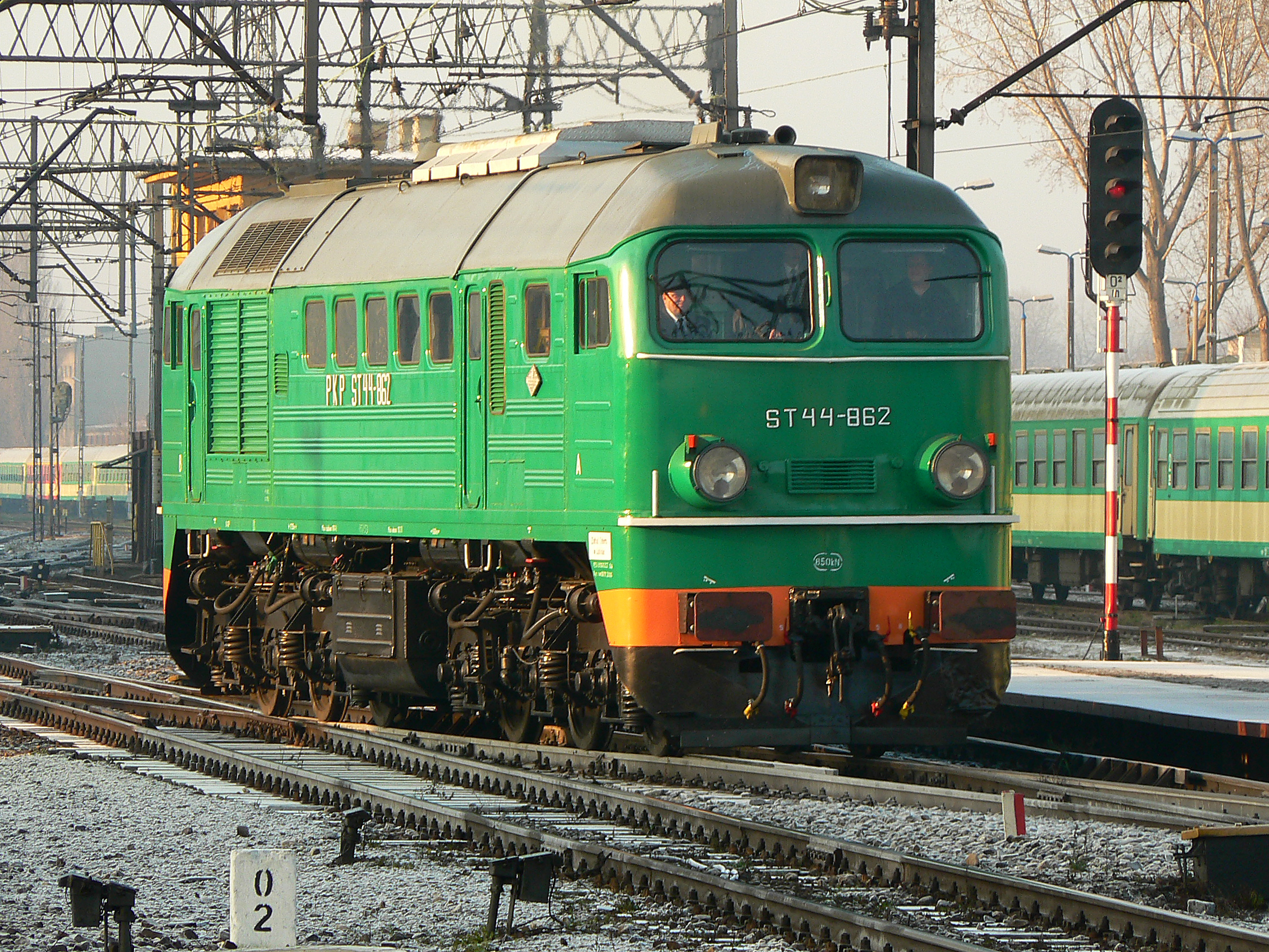
- ST44-862 in Lublin in 2006
Type and origin
- Power type: Diesel-electric
- Builder: Voroshilovgrad Locomotive Factory
- Model: M62
- Build date: 1965 - 1981
- Total produced: 1194
- Rebuilder: Pesa; Newag; Fablok
- Rebuild date: 2008 - 2021 (Pesa); 2007 - 2010 (Newag); 2005, 2009 (Fablok)
- Number rebuilt: 108 (Pesa); 37 (Newag); 6 (Fablok)
Specifications
- Configuration
  - AAR: C-C
  - UIC: Co'Co'
- Gauge: 1,435 mm (4 ft 8 1/2 in); 1,520 mm (4 ft 11 27/32 in)
- Wheel diameter: 1,050 mm (3 ft 5.339 in)
- Minimum curve: 75 m (246 ft 0.756 in)
- Wheelbase: 12,800 mm (41 ft 11.937 in)
  - Bogie: 4,200 mm (13 ft 9.354 in)
- Length: 17,550 mm (57 ft 6.945 in)
- Width: 2,950 mm (9 ft 8.142 in)
- Height: 4,493 mm (14 ft 8.890 in)
- Axle load: 19.3 t
- Loco weight: 116.5 t
- Fuel type: Diesel
- Fuel capacity: 3,900 L
- Water cap.: 950 L
- Sandbox cap.: 600 kg
- Fuel consumption: 340 kg/h
- Prime mover: Kolomna 14D40
- RPM
  - Maximum RPM: 750 rpm
- Engine type: Two-stroke Diesel engine
- Aspiration: Roots-blown
- Displacement: Ca. 150 liters
- Generator: GP-312
- Traction motors: ED-107; ED-107A; ED-118A
- Cylinders: 12
- Cylinder size: 230 x 300
- Transmission: Electric
- Gear ratio: 68:15
- MU working: Yes
- Loco brake: Matrosov; Oerlikon
- Train brakes: compress air brakes
- Safety systems: SHP
- Couplers: Screw coupler SA3 coupler
Performance figures
- Maximum speed: 100 km/h (62 mph)
- Power output: 1,472 kW (1,970 hp)
- Tractive effort: 314 kN (70,590.01 lbf)
Career
- Operators: PKP; PKP LHS
- Numbers: 001 - 1113; 1500; 2001 - 2068
- Nicknames: Gagarin; Gagar; Iwan
- Delivered: 1965
- First run: 1966
- Last run: 2022
- Retired: 1982 - 2000; 2019 - 2022
- Preserved: 2
- Scrapped: 1984 - 2022
- Disposition: 167 rebuilt, 15 exported to North Korea, 7 retired, 2 preserved, remainder scrapped

ST44 is a Polish class of Soviet standard and Russian gauge main freight diesel electric locomotives built between 1965 and 1981 for Polish State Railways and between 1977 and 1980 for Broad Gauge Metallurgy Line. They were built by Voroshilovgrad Locomotive Works in Luhansk, Ukrainian SSR. The locomotives were numbered 001 to 1113 and 2001 to 2068 for Broad Gauge, and one locomotive was numbered 1500 featuring better components.

Most of the ST44 locomotives underwent some modernizations, mostly being Pesa rebuilding in total 108 examples (76 for PKP Cargo, 32 for PKP LHS designated M62Ks), in which added modifications to it, remaining only the body. Newag also rebuilt some of the locomotives, rebuilding in total 37 examples (20 for PCC Intermodal designated 311D, 17 for PKP LHS designated ST40), Fablok as the first locomotive factory in Poland rebuilt 2 locomotives designated ST44-3001 and ST44-3002 for PKP LHS and 4 locomotives for Pol-Miedź Trans. Also, Rail Polska rebuilt 3 locomotives at ZTK Włosienica into M62M locomotives, adding some modifications and large headlights removed.

ST44 is the most produced M62 locomotive type producing more than the original M62 locomotives used in the Soviet Union, it is also the mostly used main diesel locomotive series throughout Poland. The locomotive was widely used across Poland mostly on the non-electrified mainlines, except Lower Silesia and Opole Voivodeship as the ST43 locomotives were common around here, being excellent at inclines.

== History ==
Maintaining freight steam locomotives turned out to be costly and inefficient in Polish State Railways, and the locomotive manufacturing plants weren't experienced enough for producing a mainline diesel locomotive. The need for freight diesel locomotives resulted from the gradual steam locomotive withdrawal in the 1960s, in which PKP became the motive power shortage, forcing the purchase of 200 TE locomotives from the Soviet Union. The M62 locomotive was chosen to be a replacement for Polish railway, as they had already imported a large number of locomotives from Hungarian State Railways. The decision is said to have been made after Poland had started to import ST43 locomotives from Romania. For political reasons, the Soviet Union forced Poland to buy Soviet instead of Romanian locomotives, as it preferred satellite countries not to export their products.

The first four examples were delivered in 1965 and the serial production of these locomotives started in 1967. ST44 replaced heavy freight steam locomotives as they were shorter, cheaper, faster and more efficient. Along with the construction of the broad gauge metallurgy line, PKP ordered 68 ST44 locomotives intended for hauling freight trains from the Soviet Union on the Russian gauge LHS railway line, they were delivered between February 1978 and July 1980. In the early 1980s, in the wake of social unrest, the class was terminated by the 1981 Martial law in Poland. Import of the M62 locomotives was pointed out as a shining example of Poland's economic exploitation by the Soviet Union: considering the locomotives enormous need of fuel, which was then rationed for private customers. Despite the end of production, purchases of the locomotives continued until 1988.

== Design ==
ST44 has a Co'Co' wheel arrangement, running on two bogies with three axles on each bogie.

== See also ==
- M62 locomotive (PKP)
