= PCC Rail Tabor =

Polish rail company

PCC RAIL TABOR S.A.
- Company type: JSC
- Industry: Repairs of the rolling stock
- Headquarters: Rybnik, Poland
- Key people: Leszek Zawadzki CEO; Michal Batko
- Number of employees: 700
- Website: www.pccrailtabor.pl

PCC Rail Tabor S.A. is a Polish rail company operating as a dependent company of PCC Rail. PCC Rail Tabor is responsible for repairs and maintenance of locomotives, mainly ET21, ET22, SM48, SM42, SM30, ST43 and ST44.
Railway services:

- overhauls and periodic repairs of diesel locomotives,
- refurbishment of diesel locomotives, including rebuilding of power generators,
- periodic, regular and emergency repair of goods wagons,
- construction of coal wagons and container platforms,
- repairs to machinery and equipment for track repairs.

== See also ==
- Transportation in Poland
- List of railway companies
- Polish locomotives designation
