= Rail transport in Poland =

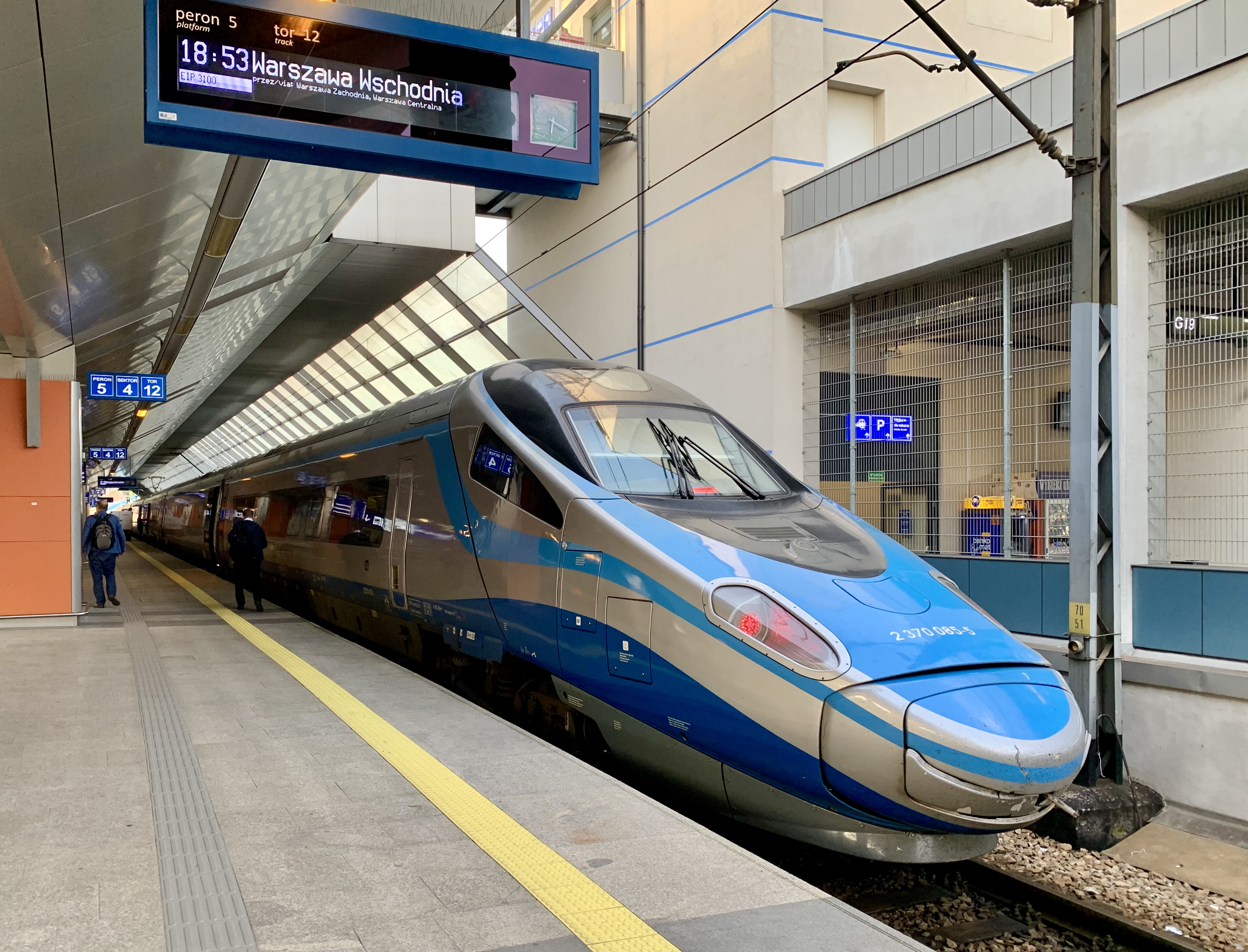
- A PKP Intercity New Pendolino train at Kraków Główny

Operation
- National railway: PKP Group
- Infrastructure company: PKP PLK
- Major operators: passenger: PKP Intercity; Polregio; Greater Poland Railways; Lower Silesian Railways; Masovian Railways; Tricity; Silesian Railways and others; cargo: PKP Cargo; DB Cargo Polska; Orlen Rail; CTL Logistics; PKP LHS & others

Statistics
- Ridership: 310 million (2018)
- Passenger-distance: 2.0833×10^{10}
- Freight: 121,258 million tkm

System length
- Total: 18,680 km (11,610 mi)
- Electrified: 12,149 km (7,549 mi)
- High-speed: 0 km (0 mi)

Track gauge
- Main: 1,435 mm (4 ft 8 1/2 in) standard gauge
- High-speed: 1,435 mm (4 ft 8 1/2 in)

Electrification
- Main: 3 kV DC

Features
- No. of stations: 2,652
Map
- Railway network in Poland

Rail transport in Poland primarily utilises standard-gauge railway lines of over 19,083 kilometres (11,858 mi), of which 98% is managed by the state-owned PKP Polskie Linie Kolejowe. In addition, there are 578.9 kilometres (359.7 mi) of broad-gauge railway lines, most notably the Broad Gauge Metallurgy Line, and 29 disconnected local narrow-gauge railways with the combined length of lines at around 423 kilometres (263 mi) as of 2025.

Poland is a member of the International Union of Railways (UIC), its UIC Country Code is 51.

Rail services are operated by a range of public and private rail operators. The state-owned PKP Group operates the majority of rail services. In addition to PKP owned companies, there are a number of private cargo operators, as well as a number of independent passenger operators, with the latter owned predominantly by Voivodeship provincial governments.

== Overview ==
Max speeds in Poland

The vast majority of the network was built before World War II by various railway companies, including by the German Deutsche Reichsbahn and by the Russian Imperial State Railways, and a minor component was built from 1946 onwards by the Communist authorities of the Polish People's Republic. During the invasion of Poland at the beginning of World War II the Polish railway network was crippled by the Luftwaffe bombing campaign. Due to the average age of the network and lack of maintenance, many sections are limited to speeds below 160 km/h (99 mph) even on trunk lines. 2,813 km (1,748 mi) allow 160 km/h (99 mph) or more.

Since Poland's entry into the European Union in 2004, major financing has been made available by European financing institutions to improve both the Polish rail network and the rolling stock fleet. Up to June 2014, the European Investment Bank had provided loans totalling €1.9 billion for rail modernization projects in Poland. An additional €578 million had been provided through December 2013 to modernize 70% of PKP Intercity rolling stock. The €665 million purchase of 20 Alstom Pendolino high-speed trains delivered in 2014 was financed in part by €342 million from the European Investment Bank.

Poland currently has no high-speed lines operated at speeds above 200 km/h (124 mph). The Central Rail Line, centralna magistrala kolejowa, 'CMK', which links Warsaw to Katowice and Kraków, was designed with an alignment to permit 250 km/h (155 mph), but for over 30 years after its construction Poland possessed no rolling stock capable of speeds above 160 km/h (99 mph). Since 2008, the CMK has been upgraded to allow higher speeds, including installation of European Train Control System Level 1 which provides the Cab signalling required by high speed trains. Most trains on the CMK still operate at speeds up to 160 km/h (99 mph), but since 14 December 2014 new Alstom Pendolino ED250 trains operate on a 90 km section of the CMK at 200 km/h (124 mph), and improvements under way should raise the authorized speed to 200 km/h (124 mph) on most of the line. In test runs on the CMK in November 2013 a new Pendolino ED250 train set a new Polish speed record of 293 km/h (182 mph).

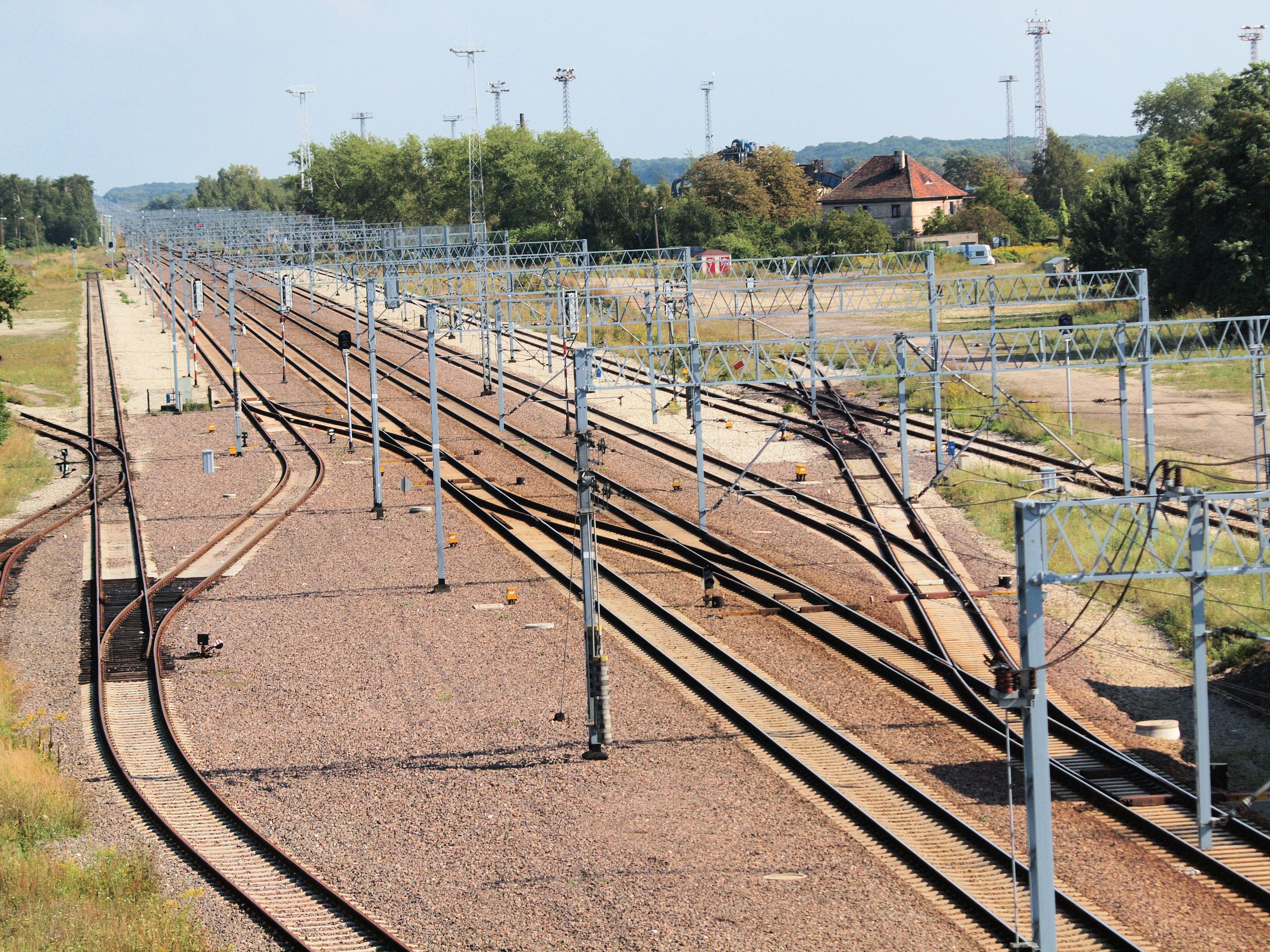
Electrified railway line in Poland

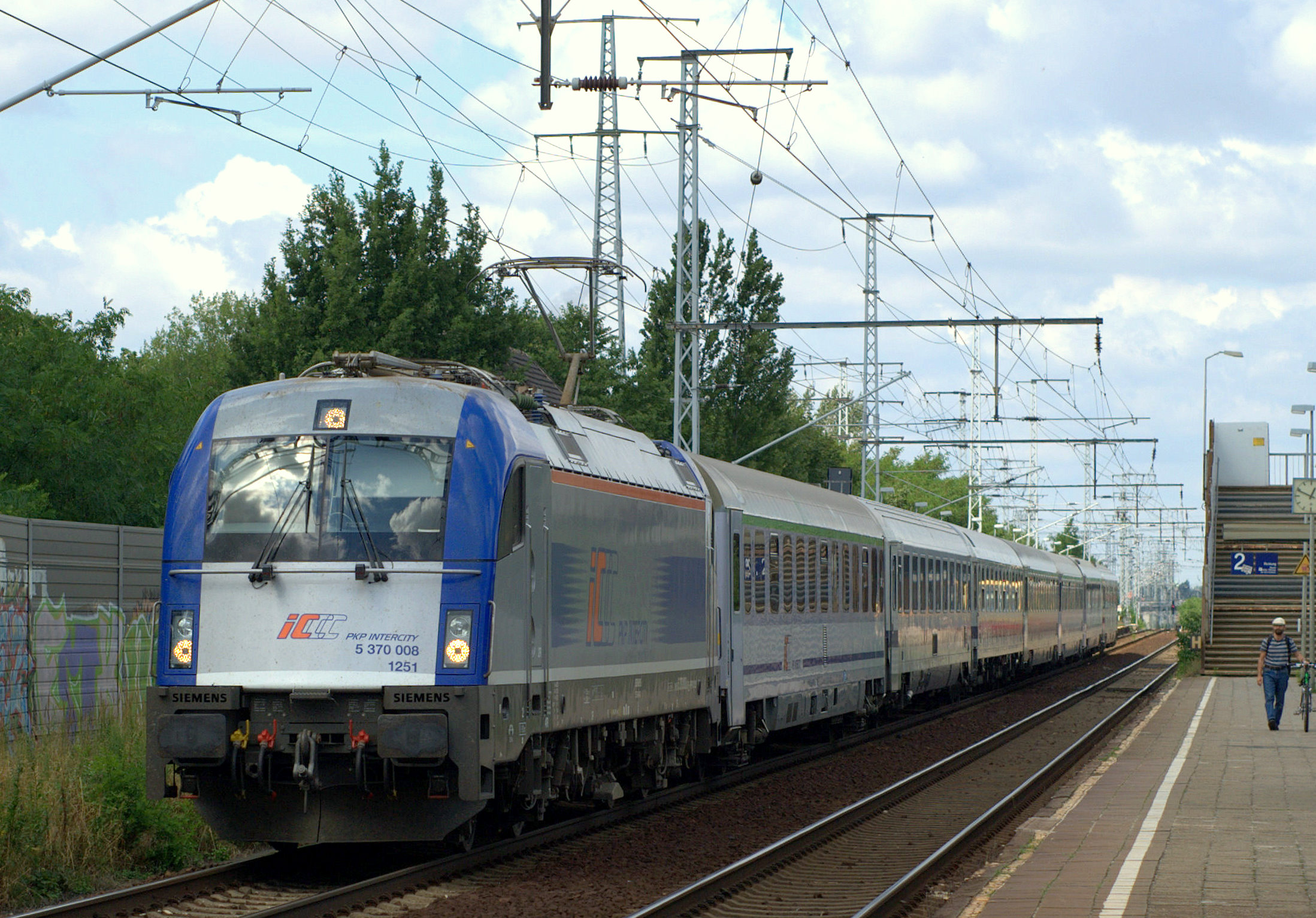
New PKP Intercity Siemens EuroSprinter departing from Berlin

In 2011–2015, the Warsaw–Gdańsk railway has undergone a major upgrading costing $3 billion, partly funded by the European Investment Bank, including track replacement, realignment of curves and relocation of sections of track to allow speeds up to 200 km/h (124 mph), modernization of stations, and installation of the most modern ETCS Level 2 signalling system, which is to be completed in June 2015. In December 2014 new Alstom Pendolino high-speed trains were put into service between Gdańsk, Warsaw and Kraków reducing the rail travel time from Gdańsk to Warsaw to 2 hours 58 minutes, to be reduced in late 2015 to 2 hours 37 minutes.

In 2008, the government announced the construction of a dedicated high speed line based on the French TGV model and possibly using TGV style trainsets, by 2020. The Y-shaped line would link Warsaw to Łódź, Poznań and Wrocław at speeds of up to 320 km/h (199 mph). The plans included an upgrade of the Central Rail Line to 250 km/h (155 mph) or more, as this line has an LGV-like profile. In December 2011 plans to build the high speed 'Y' line were postponed until 2030, due to the high cost.

As of 2008, foreign services include EuroCity and EuroNight trains between Western and Eastern Europe. Most notably, the now defunct EN Jan Kiepura. This train carried direct sleeping cars between Cologne and Warsaw. Though formerly its Western terminuses have included Brussels, Amsterdam, Basel and Munich, while the Eastern terminus for some through carriages reached as far as Moscow and Minsk.

=== Links with adjacent countries ===
Voltage of electrification systems may differ. The Polish voltage is 3 kV DC.

- Same gauge – 1,435 mm (4 ft 8 1/2 in):
  - Czech Republic – same voltage
  - Germany – 3 kV DC/15 kV AC
  - Slovakia – same voltage
  - Sweden – by train ferry; proposed fixed links, one from Szczecin to Ystad via Bornholm Island, the other from Gdynia to Karlskrona, both with 15 kV AC and SE-C loading gauge (Voltage change 3 kV DC/15 kV AC on Polish side)
- Break of gauge – 1,435 mm (4 ft 8 1/2 in)/1,520 mm (4 ft 11 27/32 in)
  - Belarus – 3 kV DC/25 kV AC, a short stretch of dual-gauge track terminates at Grodno
  - Lithuania – 3 kV DC/25 kV AC, as part of the construction of Rail Baltica a new standard-gauge diesel line from there to Kaunas was built in October 2015
  - Russia (Kaliningrad Oblast) – not electrified – there are short stretches of dual gauge sections around the border area
  - Ukraine – 3 kV DC/25 kV AC
    - through Starzhava - reopened 2023
    - through Nyzhankovychi - reopened 2023

=== Broad-gauge railways ===
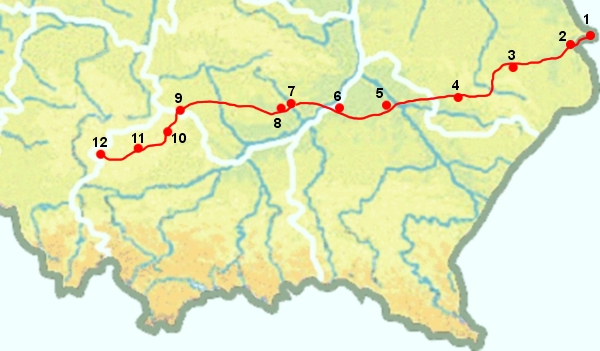
LHS links southern Poland with broad gauge railways in Ukraine and other eastern countries

The network is standard gauge except for the Linia Hutnicza Szerokotorowa (LHS) lit. 'Broad Gauge Metallurgy Line' and a few short stretches near border crossings. LHS to Sławków is the longest broad-gauge line, single track, almost 400 km (250 mi) long, from the Ukrainian border just east of Hrubieszów. It is the westernmost broad gauge line connected to the system of the former Soviet Union.

Since the 2022 Russian invasion of Ukraine, there are proposed to build more broad-gauge lines in and around Poland. LHS westward extension from Slawkow via Gliwice, Gorlitz, Jena, Paderborn and Oberhausen to Amsterdam and Rotterdam, and branch to Hamburg, and new broad-gauge link from Ukrainian border via Chelm, Lublin, Bialystok and Suwalki to Mockai (Lithuania) and branch to Gdansk Port.

== Operators ==
=== PKP Group ===
Polish State Railways (PKP), a state-owned corporate group and part of the PKP Group conglomerate, is the main provider of railway services, holding an almost complete monopoly on long-distance passenger services. It is both supported and partly funded by the government.

There are three main PKP companies:

- PKP PLK – owns and maintains infrastructure including lines and stations.
- PKP Intercity – provides long-distance connections on the most popular routes. Trains are divided into the categories: EuroNight (EN), EuroCity (EC), Express InterCity (EIC), Express InterCity Premium (EIP) – generally faster and more expensive, InterCity (IC) and (TLK) (interregional fast trains, slower than EN/EC/EIC but cheaper) and international fast trains.
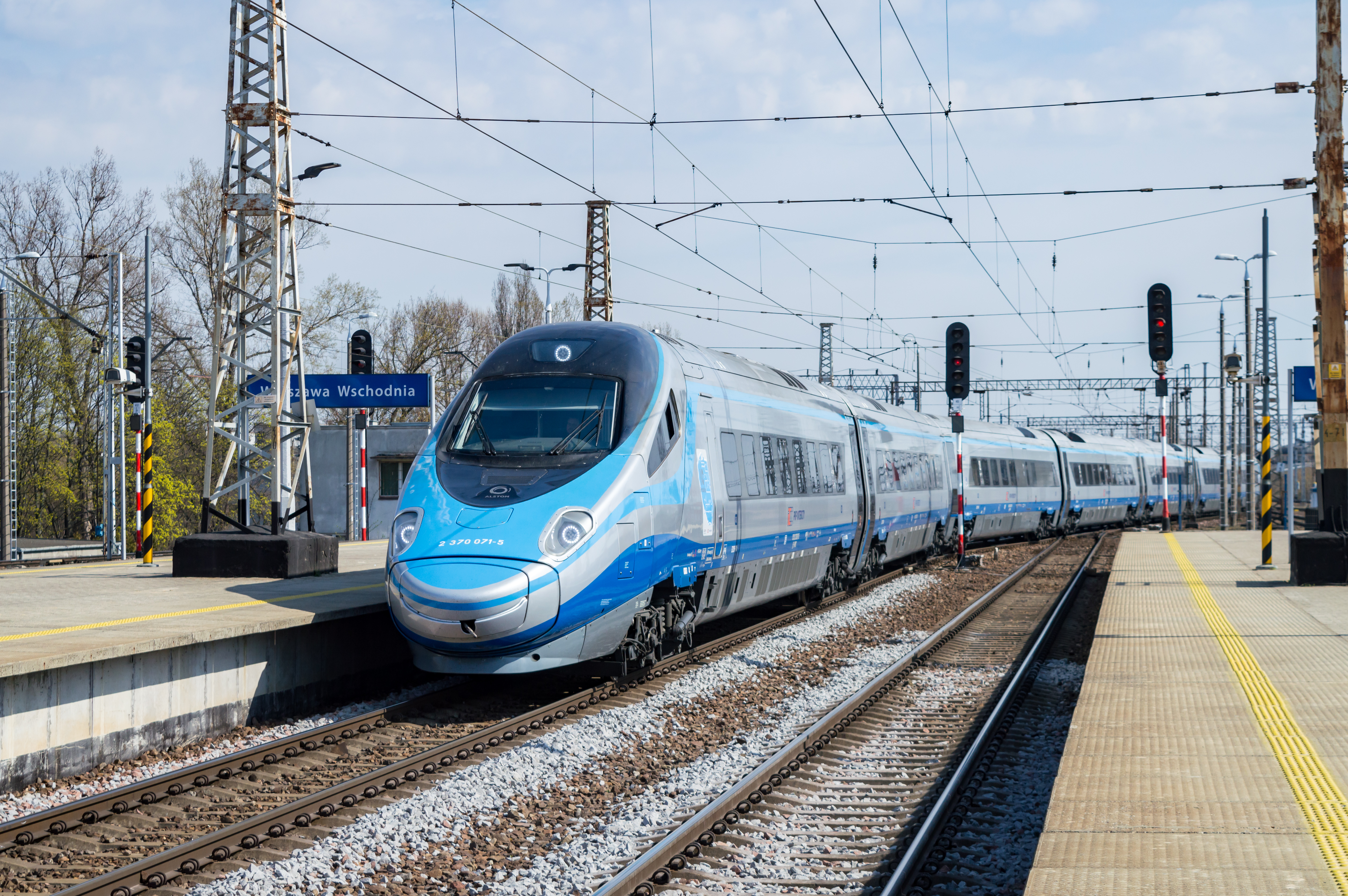
- Alstom ED250 Pendolino with Express InterCity Premium train at Warszawa Wschodnia
  PKP Cargo – provides cargo rail transport.

=== Non-PKP operators ===
Regional operators of passenger services in Poland (in Polish)

While PKP is the largest rail operator in Poland, there are several independent operators of passenger and cargo railway services. Independent Cargo operators are predominantly privately owned. Passenger operators are predominantly owned by Voivodeship governments. These include:

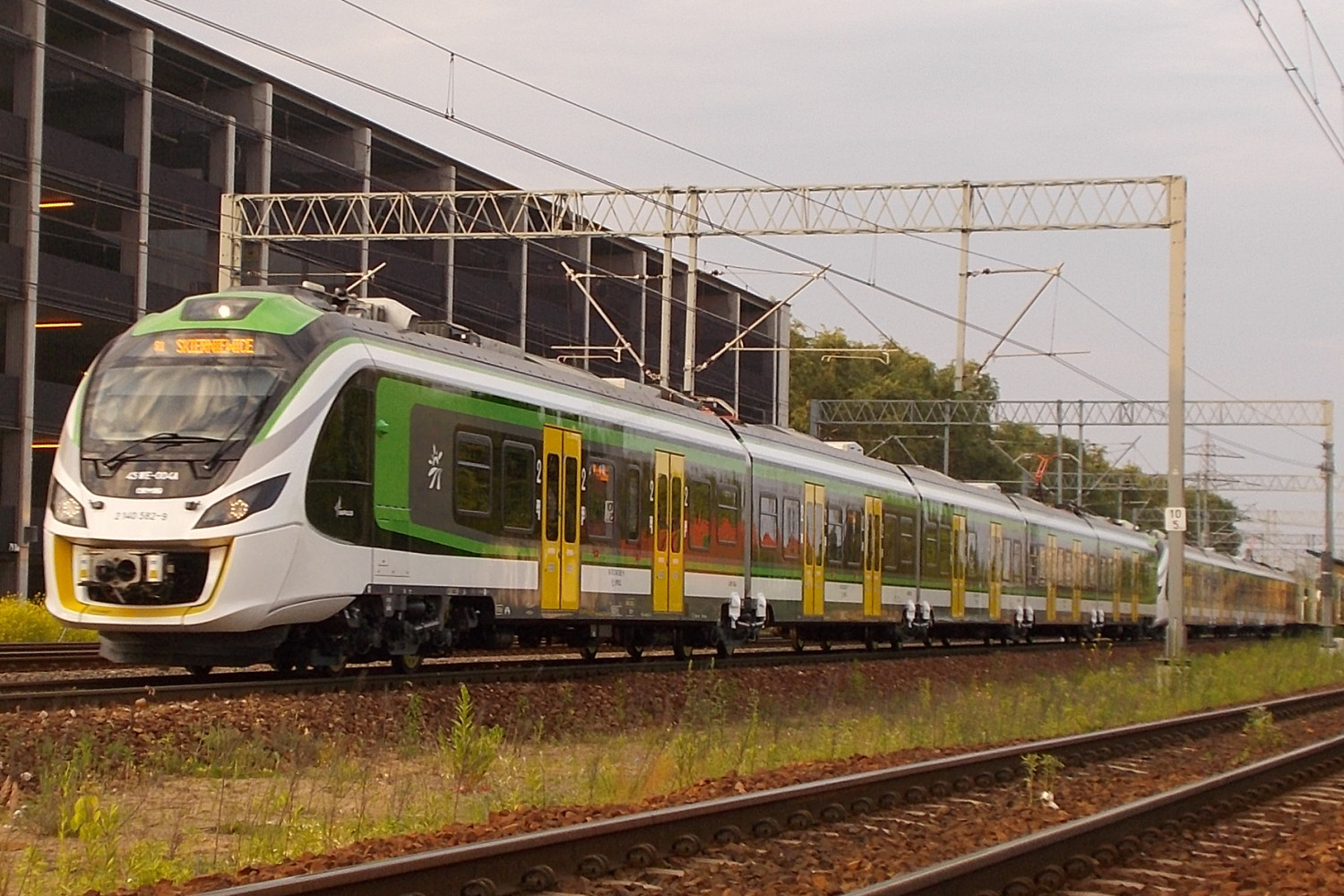
A Newag Impuls of Masovian Railways

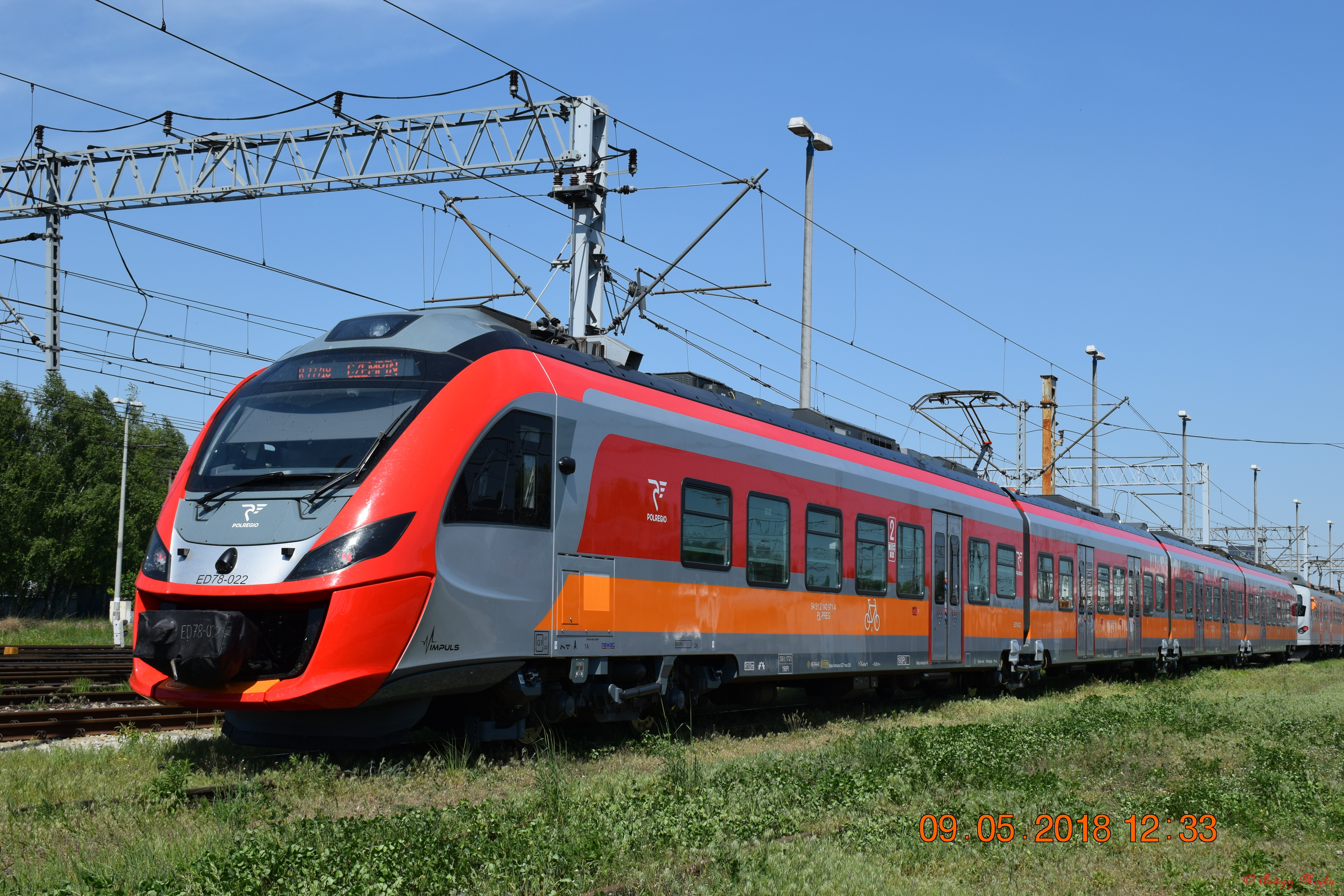
A Newag Impuls ED78 of Polregio

- Polregio – owned by regional authorities of the 16 voivodeships, formerly part of PKP Group. Operates local passenger trains (under the REGIO brand) financed by local governments, low-cost long-distance trains (interREGIO) and short-distance international trains jointly with DB Regio (REGIOekspres). Passenger trains are rather slow, mostly electric multiple units and diesel railcars/railbuses. InterREGIO trains are of slightly lower standard than TLK trains (no first class and dining cars), but are usually a bit cheaper. In June 2016, Lithuanian Railways and Przewozy Regionalne started weekend passenger train service between Bialystok and Kaunas in Lithuania.
- Deutsche Bahn
  - DB Regio connects from the border stations at Gorzów, Kostrzyn, Szczecin with the DB network with local trains (the Polish parts of their routes are generally operated by Przewozy Regionalne).
  - Arriva RP (a wholly owned subsidiary of Deutsche Bahn) is a regional operator on lines in the Kuyavian-Pomeranian and Pomeranian regions
- Lower Silesian Railways – a regional operator on a few lines in Lower Silesia.
- Lesser Poland Railways – a regional operator in the region of Kraków.
- Masovian Railways – a regional operator on all lines in Masovian Voivodeship, including Warsaw.
- Silesian Railways – a regional operator in the Silesian Voivodeship
- Greater Poland Railways – a regional operator on a few lines in Greater Poland Voivodeship.
- Łódź Agglomeration Railway – a commuter railway operator in the Łódź Voivodeship.
- Leo Express - an international operator connecting Kraków with Prague. In near future Leo Express will launch direct trains from Kraków to Warsaw
- RegioJet - international operator operating night trains between Prague and Przemyśl

==== Rapid transit ====
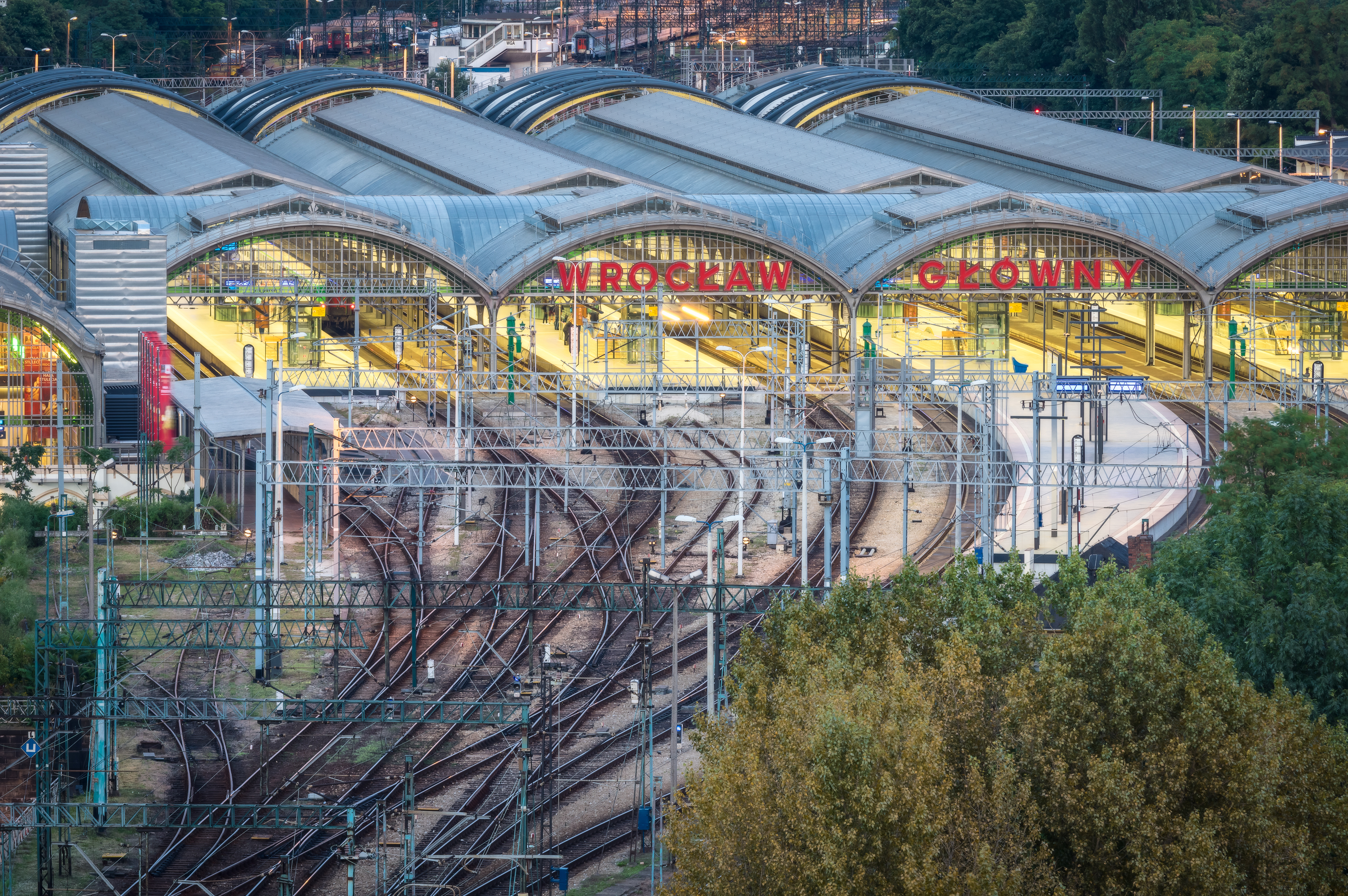
Serving 28.7 million passengers in 2024, Wrocław Główny is the busiest railway station in Poland

- Tricity Rapid Urban Railway in the Tri-city area, part of the PKP Group
- Warsaw Commuter Railway, a suburban railway in Warsaw and Western suburbs
- Rapid Urban Railway (Warsaw), a suburban city-owned network in Warsaw
- Warsaw Metro, an underground metro system in Warsaw, currently undergoing a period of expansion.

== Freight operators ==
Freight services are provided by a number of private and public rail operators. These include:

- DB Cargo Polska
- Freightliner PL
- PKP Cargo
- PKP LHS
- Orlen Kolej
- CTL Logistics

== Links to adjacent countries ==
- Belarus : break-of-gauge 1,435 mm (4 ft 8 1/2 in)/1,520 mm (4 ft 11 27/32 in)
- Lithuania : break-of-gauge 1,435 mm (4 ft 8 1/2 in)/1,520 mm (4 ft 11 27/32 in)
- Russia (Kaliningrad) : break-of-gauge 1,435 mm (4 ft 8 1/2 in)/1,520 mm (4 ft 11 27/32 in)
- Ukraine : break-of-gauge 1,435 mm (4 ft 8 1/2 in)/1,520 mm (4 ft 11 27/32 in) apart from LHS

== See also ==
- History of rail transport in Poland
- Railway lines of Poland
- Railroad Guards (Poland)
- Transport in Poland
