= M62 locomotive (PKP) =

M62
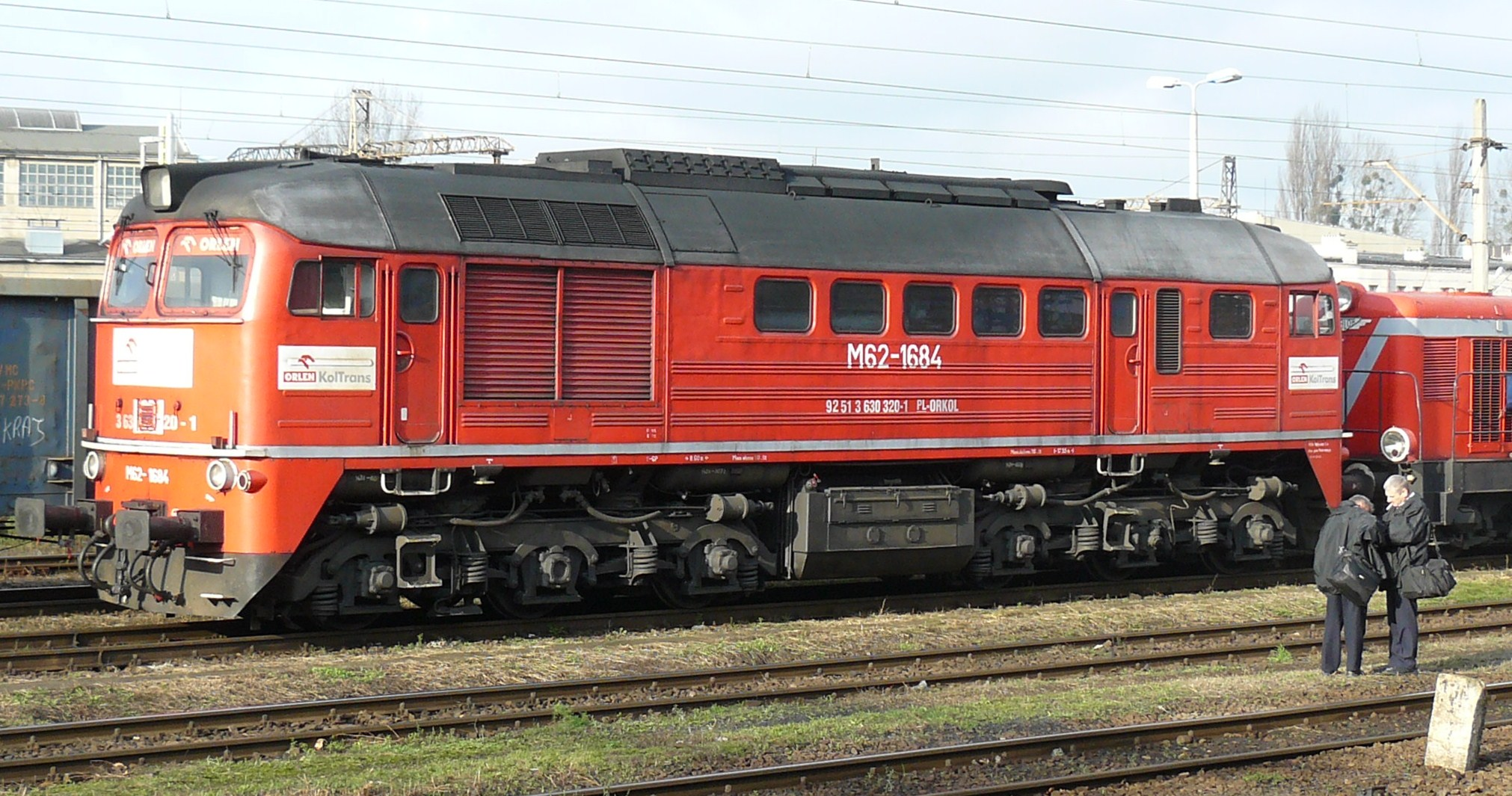
- M62-1684 in part of ORLEN KolTrans in Ostrów Wielkopolski
Type and origin
- Power type: Diesel-electric
- Builder: Voroshilovgrad Locomotive Works
- Model: M62; 2M62; 2M62U
- Build date: 1966 - 1993
- Total produced: 124
- Rebuilder: Pesa; Rail Polska; Tabor Szynowy Opole
- Rebuild date: 2004 - 2016
- Number rebuilt: 34
Specifications
- Configuration
  - AAR: C-C
  - UIC: Co'Co'
- Gauge: 1,435 mm (4 ft 8 1/2 in)
- Wheel diameter: 1,050 mm (3 ft 5.339 in)
- Minimum curve: 75 m (246 ft 0.756 in)
- Wheelbase: 12,800 mm (41 ft 11.937 in)
  - Bogie: 4,200 mm (13 ft 9.354 in)
- Length: 17,550 mm (57 ft 6.945 in)
- Width: 2,950 mm (9 ft 8.142 in)
- Height: 4,493 mm (14 ft 8.890 in)
- Axle load: 19.3 t
- Loco weight: 116.5 t
- Fuel type: Diesel
- Fuel capacity: 3,900 L
- Water cap.: 950 L
- Sandbox cap.: 600 kg
- Fuel consumption: 340 kg/h
- Prime mover: Kolomna 14D40
- RPM
  - Maximum RPM: 750 rpm
- Engine type: Two-stroke Diesel engine
- Aspiration: Roots-blown
- Displacement: Ca. 150 liters
- Generator: GP-312
- Traction motors: ED-107
- Cylinders: 12
- Cylinder size: 230 x 300
- Transmission: Electric
- Gear ratio: 68:15
- MU working: Yes
- Loco brake: Oerlikon
- Train brakes: compress air brakes
- Safety systems: SHP
- Couplers: Screw coupler SA3 coupler
Performance figures
- Maximum speed: 100 km/h (62 mph)
- Power output: 1,472 kW (1,970 hp)
- Tractive effort: 314 kN (70,590.01 lbf)
Career
- Operators: Private railway companies
- Locale: Poland
- Delivered: 2004–2022
- Disposition: M62: 40 in service, 21 scrapped, 13 out of service, 3 stored, 3 exported, 1 retired M62Y: both exported to Serbia

M62 is a Soviet main freight diesel electric locomotive built between 1966 and 1993 for Eastern Bloc countries, they were then sold to private railway companies in Poland after their retirement. Built by Voroshilovgrad Locomotive Works in Luhansk, Soviet Union (in Ukraine 1991 - 1993). The locomotives aren't classified by PKP in which they're classified by its build model, the fleet numbers are numbered differently, at which some of the locomotives might have their original fleet numbers before they were exported.

M62s were imported from Germany, Lithuania, Latvia, Estonia, Hungary and Russia, they were originally built for Czechoslovak State Railways, Deutsche Reischbahn, Hungarian State Railways and Soviet Railways, after the collapse of Soviet Union the locomotives operating in the Baltic states came in part of Lithuanian Railways, Latvian Railways and Eesti Raudtee, those operating in Ukraine came in part of Ukrainian Railways, after the dissolution of Czechoslovakia most of the locomotives were exported to Germany, M62s owned by Deutsche Bahn were sold to German private railway companies, mostly to ITL Dresden in 1999. Some of the M62 locomotives were refurbished from ST44 locomotives, additionally Poland had their own M62 locomotives delivered from the Soviet Union, specially built for industrial railways in Poland.

The locomotives underwent some refurbishments and modernisations for the private railway companies, Rail Polska refurbished 16 locomotives and reclassified them to M62M, some of them were even rebuilt into electric locomotives classified 207E, Pesa with the ability of modernising ST44 locomotives also modernised the M62s, as well as Tabor Szynowy Opole where it refurbished the 2M62U locomotives, they were rebuilt into single unit locomotives in Daugavplis, Latvia which were then exported to Poland.

== See also ==
- PKP class ST44
