= CTL Logistics =

Polish rail company

CTL Logistics S. A.

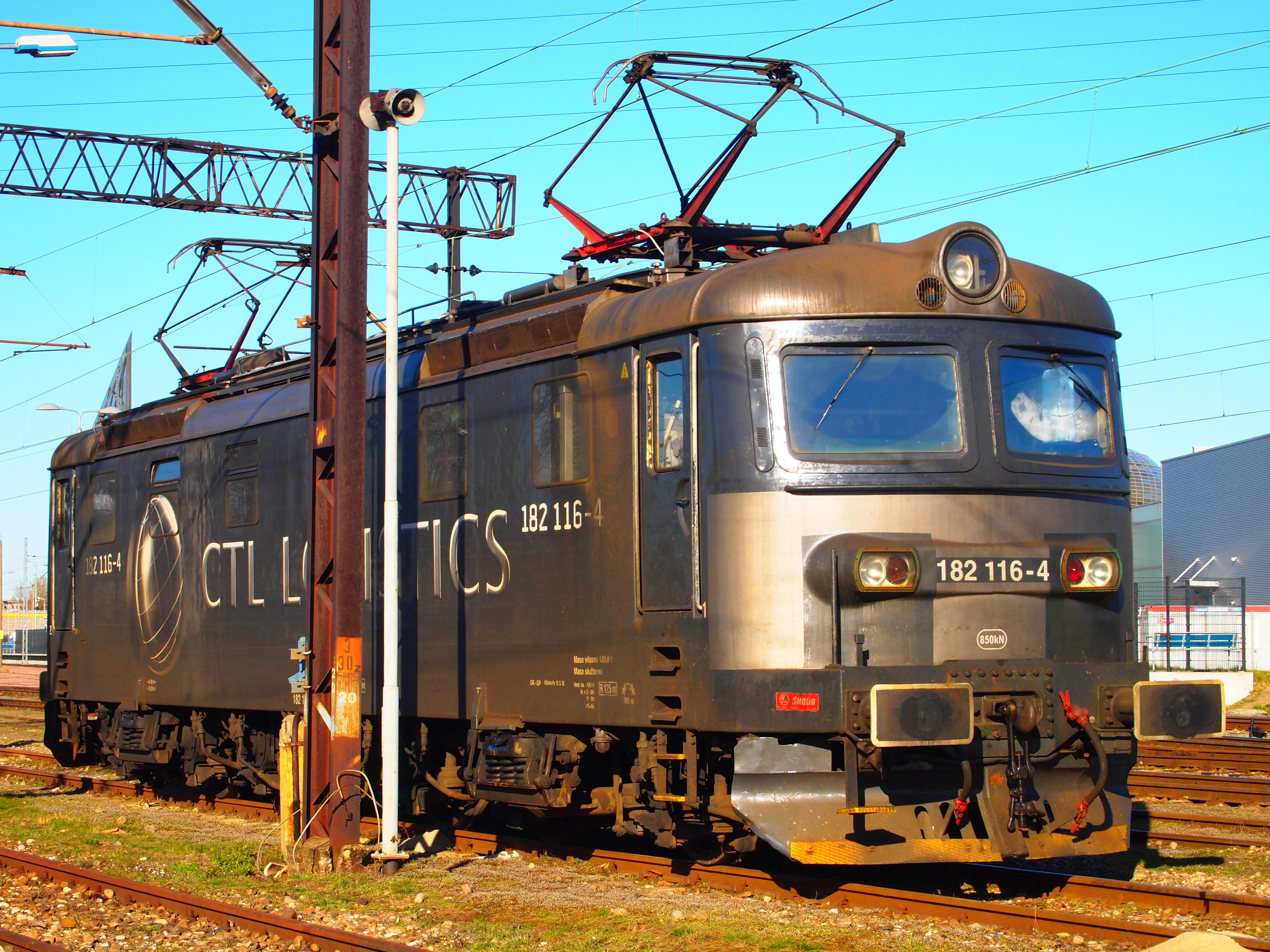
- Company type: JSC
- Industry: Rail transport
- Founded: 1992 under current name since 2005
- Headquarters: Warsaw, Poland
- Key people: Grzegorz Bogacki; CEO
- Revenue: ▲250.000.000 EUR (2005)
- Number of employees: 2500
- Website: ctl.pl

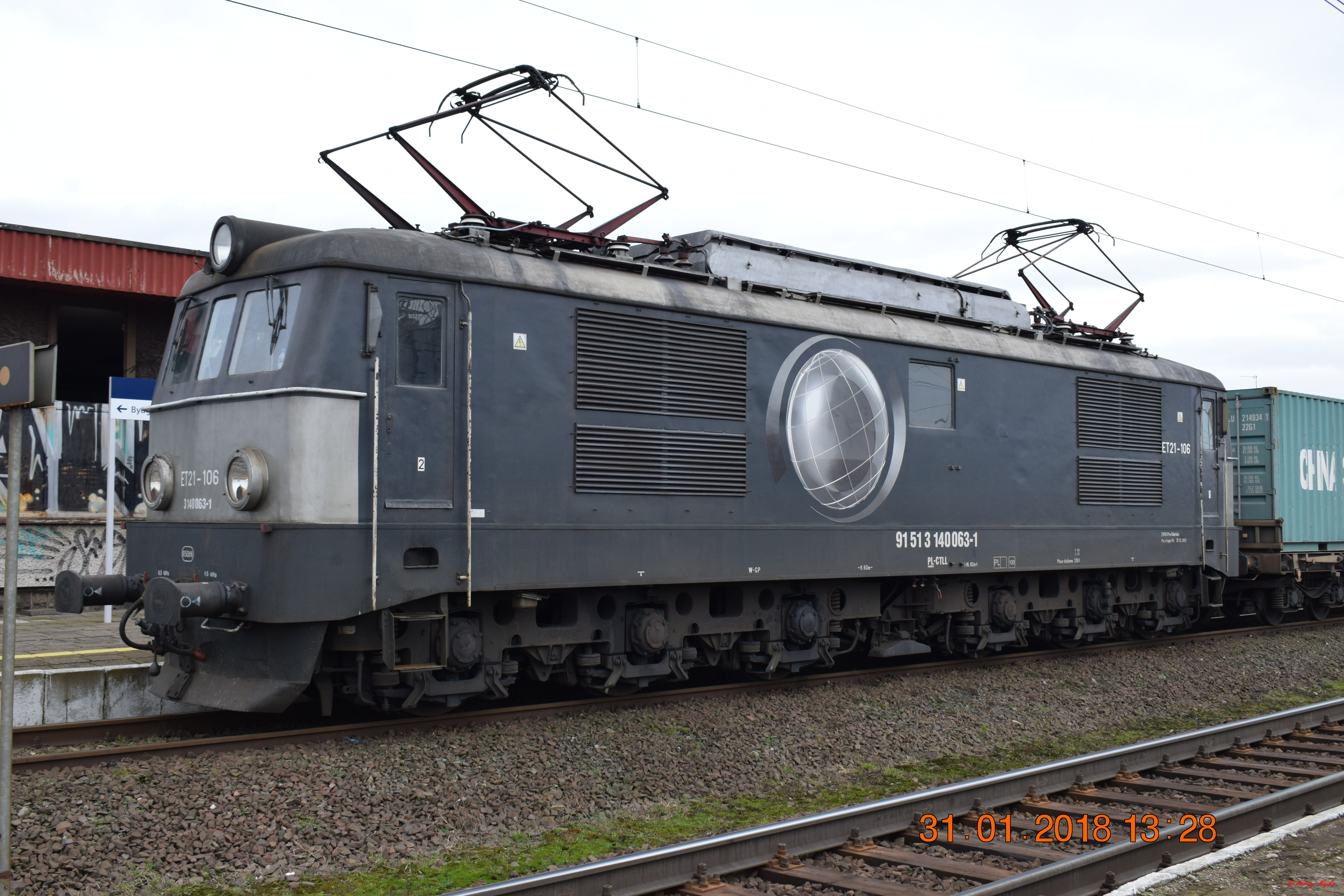
ET21 locomotive

CTL Logistics is a Polish rail JSC company operating mainly in freight transport. It consist of several dependent companies responsible for different areas of railway business.

== Share in local market ==
CTL Logistics operates 138 km. of own rail tracks and total of 660 km. of all tracks in the system. The company owns 165 locomotives and 4.400 freight cars. In 2005 it transported over 40.000.000 tons of cargo, achieving share of 33% in private railway market.

== Rolling stock ==
CTL uses mostly PKP class ET22, PKP class ET21, PKP class ST43 and PKP class ST44 locomotives. The company distinguishes its locomotives from PKP and other railways by painting them in blue and white colours, with orange front and a white logo positioned on the sides of body. Since 2007, CTL uses black and silver as its new company colours.

== History ==
CTL Logistics emerges from Chem Trans Logic company, who started operation in 1992, taking care of mainly chemicals transport. Fast development succeeded in starting a CTL Group holding with several Polish and German companies as participants. On the brink of 2004 and 2005 the company changed name to CTL Logistics.

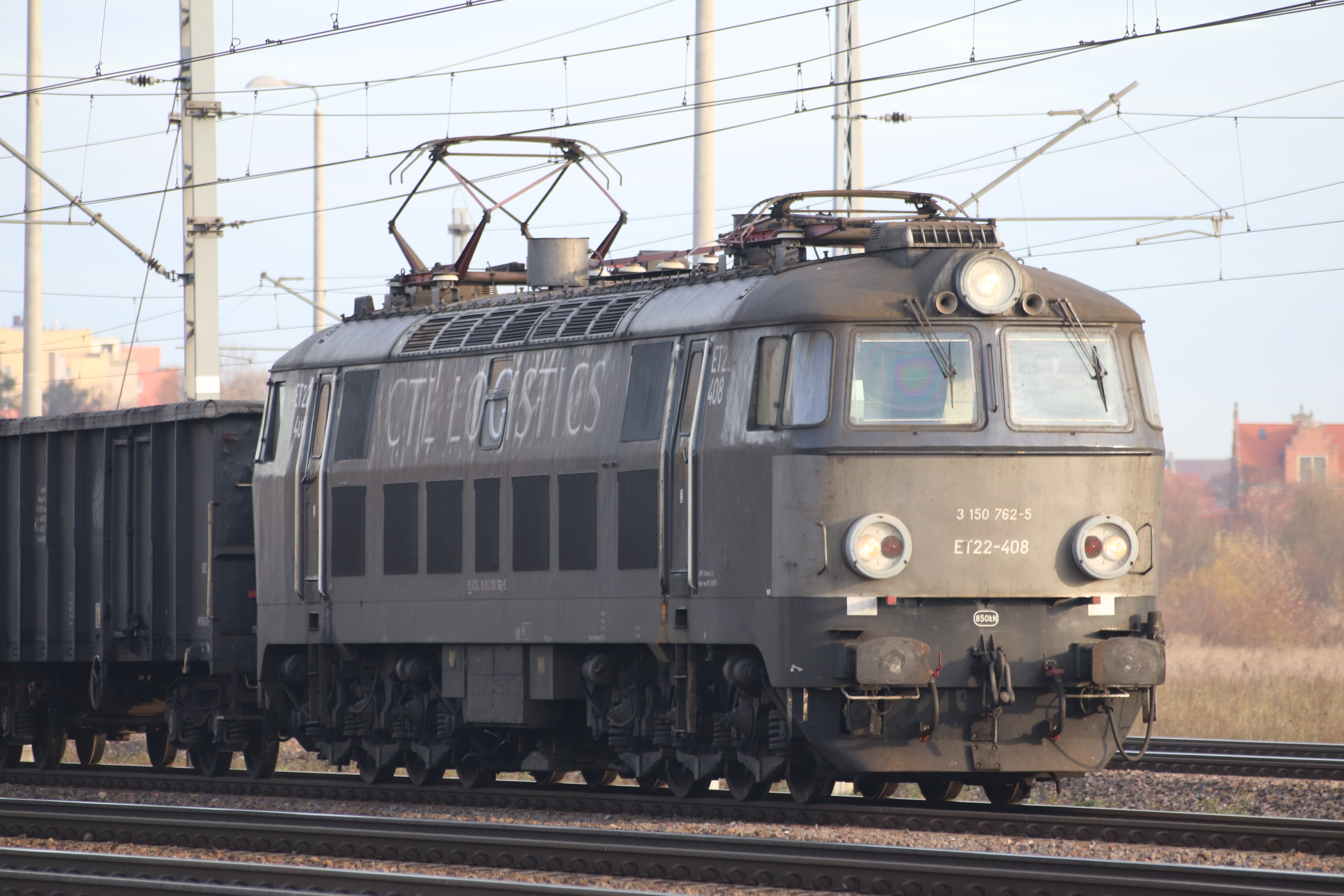
ET22 locomotive

=== Dependent companies ===
Following companies operate as holding members (joining year in brackets): CTL Północ (1993), CTL Południe (1994), CTL Logistics GmbH (1995), CTL Wagony, CTL Polski Koks Spedycja (1996), Panopa Polska, CTL Tankpol, CTL Chemkol, CTL Agencja Celna (2000), CTL Maczki-Bór (2002), CTL Rail, CTL Rail GmbH, CTL Kolzap, CTL Trans-port (2004), CTL Kargo Sp. z o.o. (2005),

== See also ==
- Transportation in Poland
- List of railway companies
- Polish locomotives designation

== Notes ==
Notice, that CTL is already an abbreviation from Chem Trans Logic.
