= Lawrence High School =

Lawrence High School may refer to:

In the United States:

- Lawrence High School (Kansas), in Lawrence, Kansas
- Lawrence High School (New Jersey), in Lawrenceville, New Jersey
- Lawrence High School (New York), in Cedarhurst, New York
- Lawrence High School (Maine), in Fairfield, Maine
- Lawrence High School (Massachusetts) in Lawrence, Massachusetts
- Lawrence High School (Nebraska), in Lawrence, Nebraska
- Lawrence Central High School, in Marion County, Indianapolis, Indiana
- Lawrence County High School (Alabama), in Moulton, Alabama
- Lawrence County High School (Kentucky), in Louisa, Kentucky
- Lawrence County High School (Mississippi), in Monticello, Mississippi
- Lawrence County High School (Tennessee), in Lawrenceburg, Tennessee

== See also ==
- Lawrence School (disambiguation), any of a group of schools in India and Pakistan
