= Sławków =

Town in Silesian Voivodeship, Poland

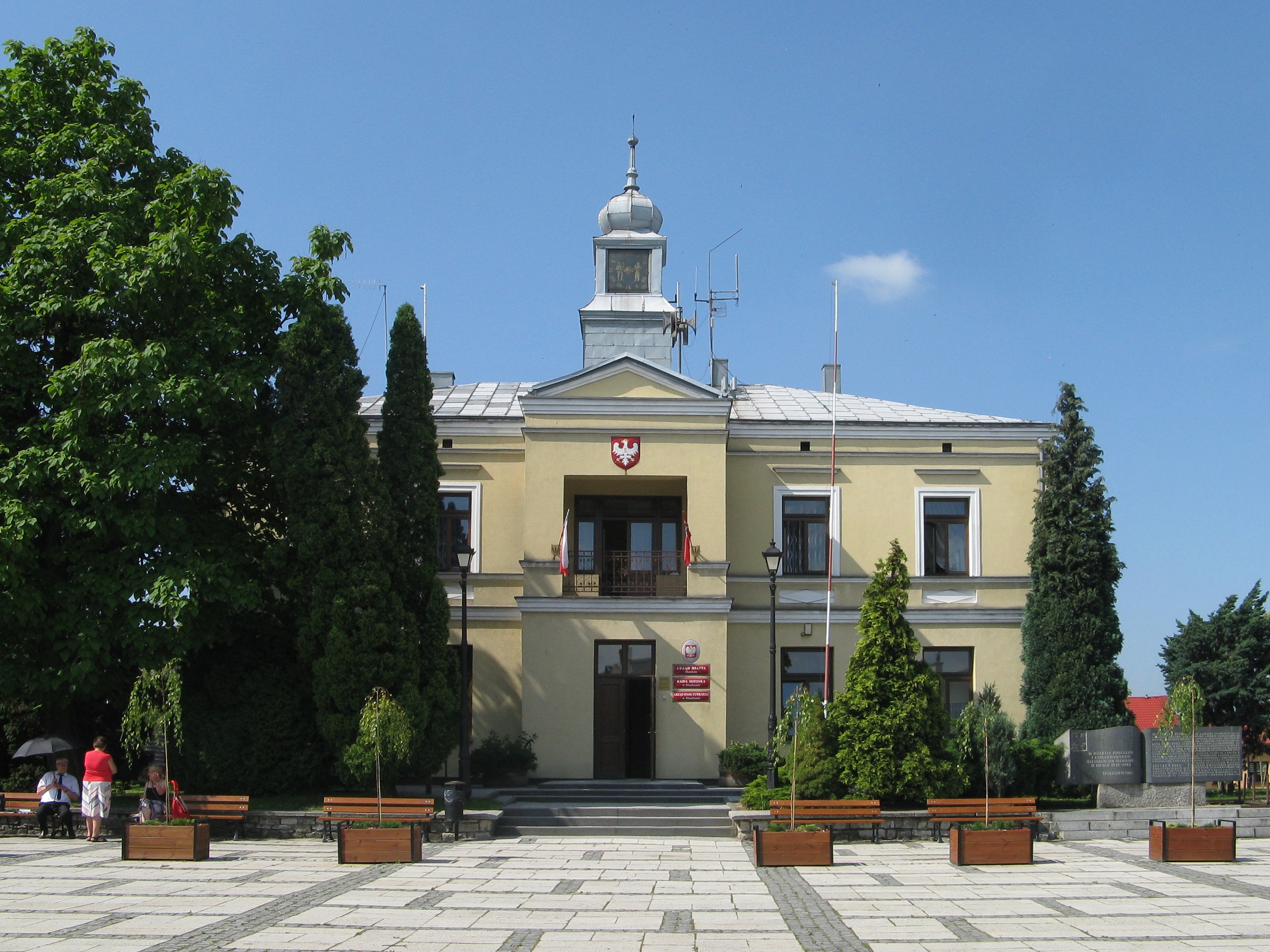
- Town hall

- Flag Coat of arms

- Location within Poland
- Coordinates: 50°19′N 19°23′E
- Country: Poland
- Voivodeship: Silesian
- County: Będzin
- Gmina: Sławków (urban gmina)

Area
  - City: 36.6 km^{2} (14.1 sq mi)

Population (2019-06-30)
  - City: 7,017
  - Density: 192/km^{2} (497/sq mi)
  - Urban: 2,746,000
  - Metro: 5,294,000
- Time zone: UTC+1 (CET)
  - Summer (DST): UTC+2 (CEST)
- Postal code: 41-260
- Vehicle registration: SBE
- Website: http://www.slawkow.pl

Sławków [ˈswafkuf] is a town in the Silesian Voivodeship in southern Poland, located in the Zagłębie Dąbrowskie (part of historic province of Lesser Poland), near Katowice. Outer town of the Metropolis GZM – a metropolis with a population of around 2 million. The population of the town is 7,017 (2019). It is the western terminus of the Broad Gauge Metallurgy Line.

== Location ==
Sławków is located in western Lesser Poland, 29 kilometres (18 miles) from Katowice, and 56 km (35 mi) from Kraków, in Kraków-Silesia Upland (part of Lesser Poland Upland), on the Biała Przemsza river. The town borders Dąbrowa Górnicza, Sosnowiec, Jaworzno and Bukowno. Apart from its historic center, Sławków has 25 smaller districts, and as much as 35% of the town is covered by forests.

== Etymology ==
The name of the town comes from the Polish male given name Sławomir (Sławko, Sławek), and can be translated as The settlement of Sławko.

== History ==
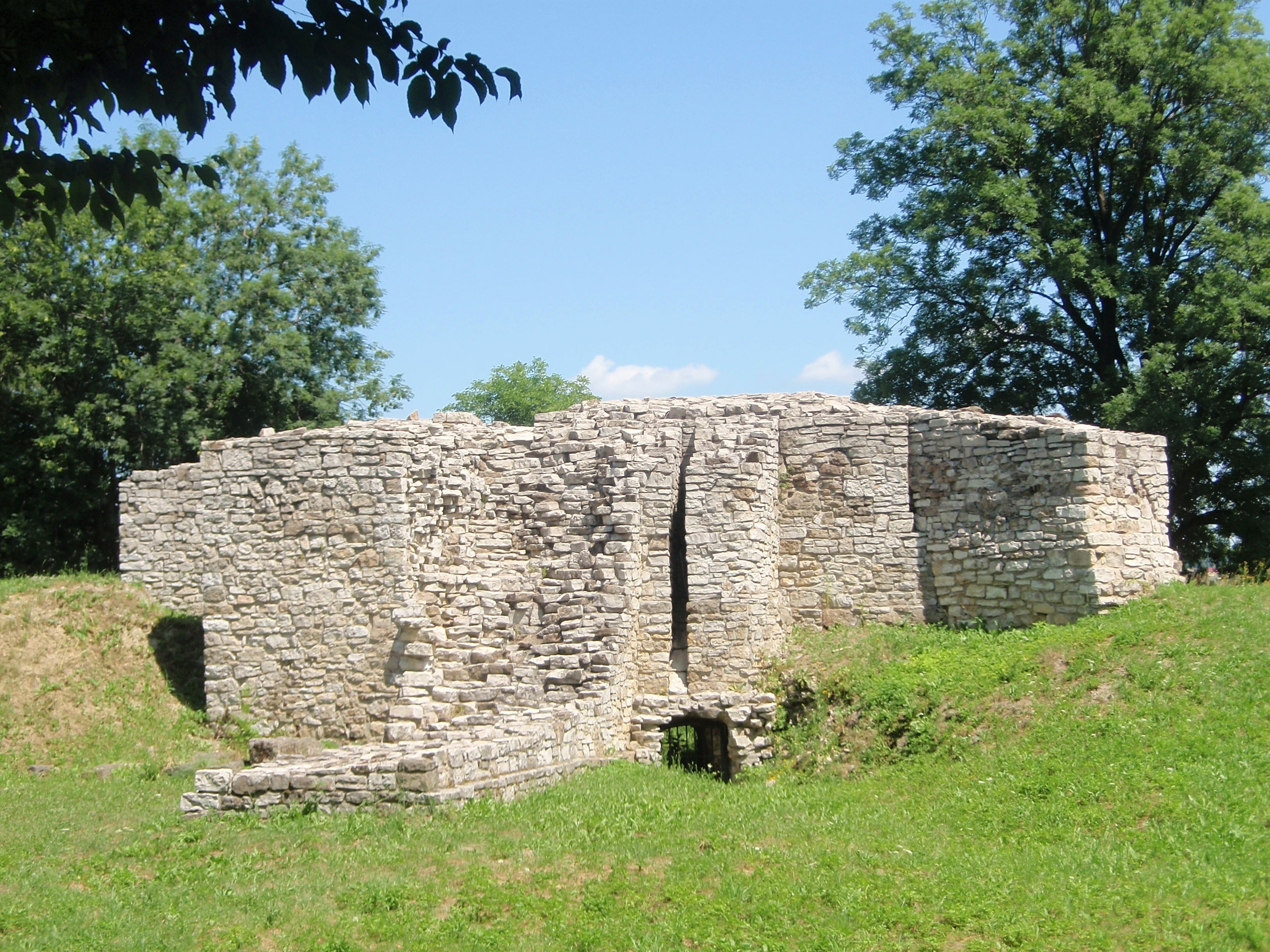
Ruins of the Sławków castle (13th century)

Archaeological sites from the Paleolithic and Neolithic ages have been discovered giving evidence to early human settlement in the area. The first written record of the town's name comes from 1220. However, the exact date of its incorporation remains unknown. Indirect written sources indicate that it most probably took place between 1279 and 1286. This assumption is supported by two documents from the 13th century: a charter issued in 1279 by Prince Bolesław V the Chaste, in which the locality is still called a village (villa episcopalis) and an agreement dated 1286 between the Bishop of Kraków Paweł z Przemankowa and Prince Leszek II the Black, in which Sławków is already called a town (civitas). In the 1280s, Bishop Paweł z Przemankowa built here a defensive castle, located near western border of Lesser Poland.

Due to rich deposits of lead and silver, and location on a merchant route from Kraków to Wrocław, Sławków quickly developed, and in the 13th century it was one of the most important urban centers of Lesser Poland. In the 14th century its importance diminished, and later on, the town was destroyed several times in numerous wars (1433, 1434, 1455), as well as in a fire (1498). Furthermore, the deposits of silver and lead dried out. Until the Partitions of Poland, Sławków remained administrative center of properties of the Bishop of Kraków.

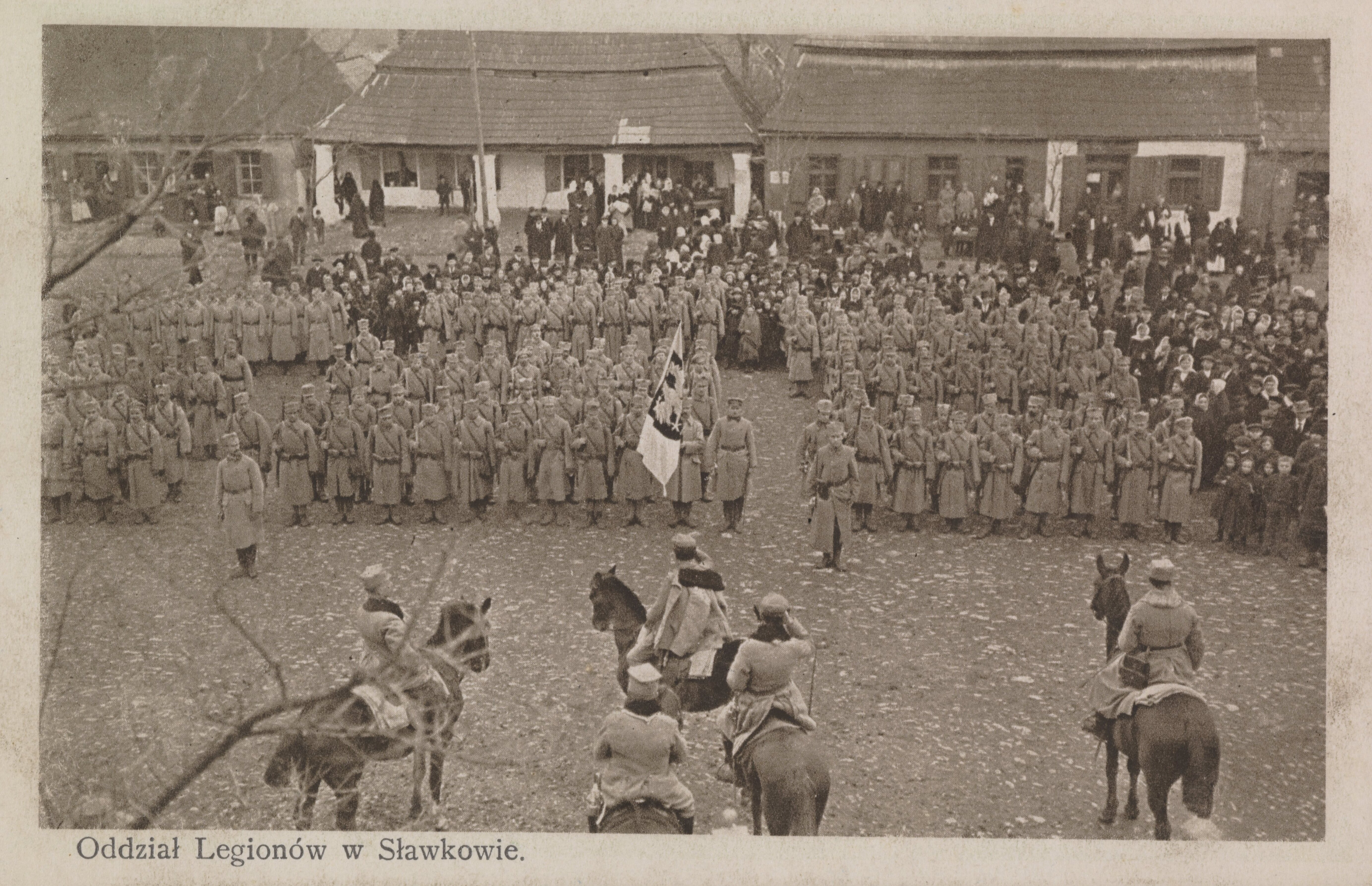
Polish Legions in Sławków in 1915 during World War I

After the Third Partition of Poland in 1795, Sławków was annexed by Prussia and included within newly formed New Silesia, and in 1806 was annexed by the Duchy of Warsaw. After the duchy's dissolution in 1815, it passed to Russian-controlled Congress Poland. In the mid-19th century first industrial enterprises were established here, and the town was connected with other locations in the area by a paved road. In 1870 Sławków lost its town privileges, to recover them in 1958. In 1885 it got a rail connection with Kielce and Dąbrowa Górnicza, in 1887 with Sosnowiec. In the Second Polish Republic Sławków belonged to Olkusz County, part of Kielce Voivodeship.

During the German invasion of Poland at the start of World War II, on 9 September 1939, German troops committed a massacre of 98 Jews in Sławków. Over a dozen Poles, who were either born or lived and worked in Sławków, including several policemen and the local police chief, were murdered by the Russians in the Katyn massacre in 1940.

Aerial view of the town center in 1989

After the war, until 1975, it belonged to Kraków Voivodeship, then was transferred to Katowice Voivodeship. Between 1977 and 1984, Sławków was a district of Dąbrowa Górnicza. At that time the town grew in size, due to the construction of Katowice Steelworks. From 1999 to 2001, Sławków was part of Lesser Poland Voivodeship. When it was transferred to Silesian Voivodeship in 2002, it was assigned to Będzin County, despite being separated from the rest of that county by the cities of Dąbrowa Górnicza and Sosnowiec.

== Sights ==
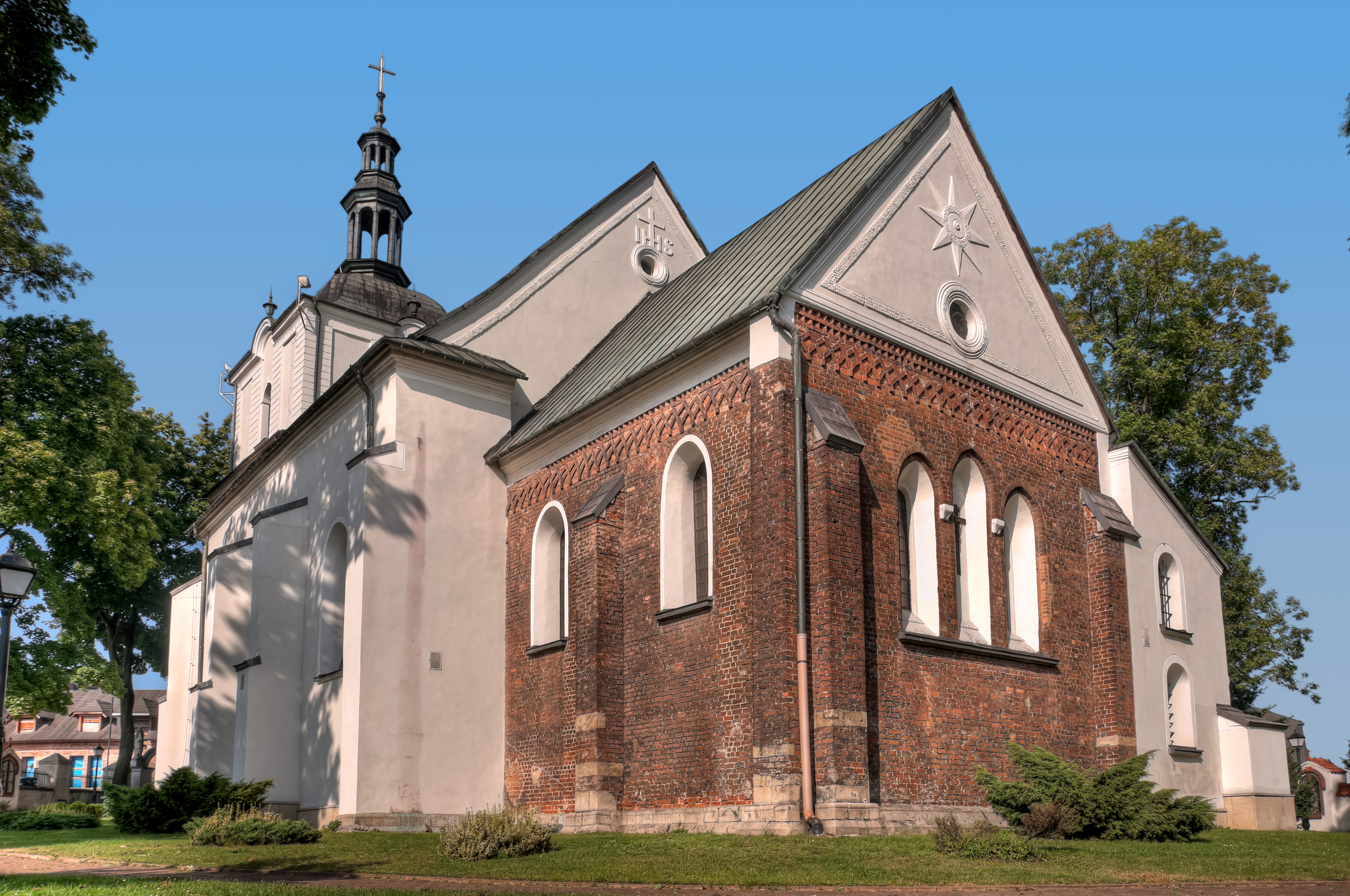
St. Nicholas Church

18th-century inn

Art Gallery and Tourist Information Center

18th-century hospital for miners

- Medieval center of the town, with a market square, and a town hall from 1905
- 18th-century inn (austeria),
- St. Nicholas Church,
- complex of church parish (18th century),
- hospital for miners (1758),
- ruins of the castle of Bishops of Kraków (13th century, destroyed in 1455 and never rebuilt),
- Lamus – manor house of Bishops of Kraków (18th century)
- St. Jacob Church (1827)
- St. Rozalia wayside shrine (1536)

== Broad gauge railway ==
Linia Hutnicza Szerokotorowa (known by its acronym LHS, English: Broad gauge metallurgy line) in Sławków is the longest broad gauge railway line in Poland. Except for this one line, and a few very short stretches near border crossings, Poland uses the standard gauge for its railways, unlike Russia and the other former countries of the Soviet Union. The line runs on a single track for almost 400 km (249 mi) from the Polish-Ukrainian border, crossing it just east of Hrubieszów, to Sławków. It is used only for freight transport, mainly iron ore and coal. It is the westernmost broad gauge railway line in Europe that is connected to the broad gauge rail system of the countries which before 1991 constituted the Soviet Union. The line is managed by PKP Linia Hutnicza Szerokotorowa Spólka z o.o. company. Previous name of this line was Linia Hutniczo-Siarkowa (English: Metallurgy – Sulphur Line), but after sulfur ceased to be transported on the line its name was changed.

== Twin towns – sister cities ==
Sławków is twinned with:

- Horní Slavkov, Czech Republic
- Malý Slavkov, Slovakia
- Messeix, France
- Slavkov u Brna, Czech Republic
