= Lamar High School =

Lamar High School may refer to:

- Lamar High School (Arkansas) in Lamar, Arkansas
- Lamar High School (Colorado) in Lamar, Colorado
- Lamar High School (Missouri) in Lamar, Missouri
- Lamar High School (South Carolina) in Lamar, South Carolina
- Lamar High School (Arlington, Texas) in Arlington, Texas
- Lamar High School (Houston, Texas) in Houston, Texas

Lamar High School might also reference:

- Lamar Consolidated High School in Rosenberg, Texas
- Lamar School, Meridian, Mississippi
- Le Mars Community School District in Le Mars, Iowa
