= Lowell High School =

Lowell High School may refer to:

- Lowell High School (Lowell, Indiana)
- Lowell High School (Lowell, Massachusetts)
- Lowell High School (Lowell, Michigan)
- Lowell High School (Lowell, North Carolina) (defunct)
- Lowell High School (San Francisco)
- Lowell High School (Whittier, California)
- Lowell Junior/Senior High School (Lowell, Oregon)
