= Lafayette High School =

Lafayette High School is the name of many secondary schools in the United States, among them:

- Lafayette High School (Alabama), in Lafayette, Alabama
- Lafayette High School (Georgia), in Lafayette, Georgia
- Lafayette High School (Kentucky), in Lexington, Kentucky
- Lafayette High School (Louisiana), in Lafayette, Louisiana
- Lafayette High School (St. Joseph, Missouri), in St. Joseph, Missouri
- Lafayette High School (Wildwood, Missouri), in Wildwood, Missouri
- Lafayette High School (Buffalo, New York), in Buffalo, New York
- Lafayette High School (New York City), in Brooklyn, New York
- Lafayette High School (Virginia), near Williamsburg, Virginia
- Lafayette High School (Mississippi), in Oxford, Mississippi
