= Lawrence School =

Lawrence School may refer to:

- Lawrence School, Lovedale, school in Tamil Nadu, India
- The Lawrence School, Sanawar, school in Himachal Pradesh, India
- Lawrence School (Sagamore Hills, Ohio), school in United States

== See also ==
- Lawrence College Ghora Gali, school in Pakistan
