= Lexington High School =

Lexington High School can refer to more than one educational institution in the United States:

- Lexington High School (Illinois) — Lexington, Illinois
- Lexington High School (Massachusetts) — Lexington, Massachusetts
- Lexington High School (Missouri) — Lexington, Missouri part of Lexington R-V School District
- Lexington Senior High School (Nebraska)
- Lexington Senior High School (North Carolina) — Lexington, North Carolina
- Lexington High School (Ohio) — Lexington, Ohio
- Lexington High School (South Carolina) — Lexington, South Carolina
- Lexington High School (Tennessee) — Lexington, Tennessee
- Lexington High School (Texas) — Lexington, Texas
