= PKP class ST40 =

PKP ST40/Newag 311Da
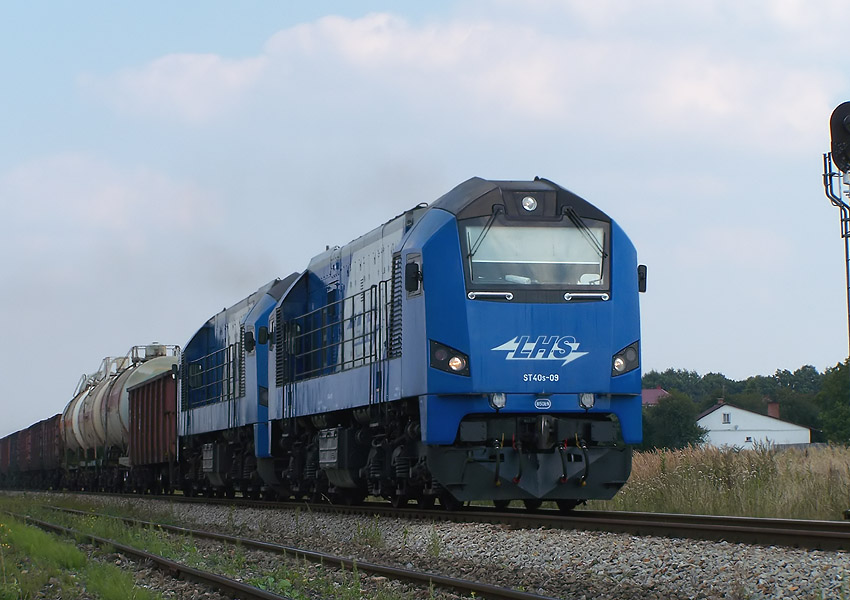
- PKP LHS ST40s-09
Type and origin
- Power type: Diesel
- Builder: Newag (Poland)
- Model: 311Da
- Build date: 2007-
Specifications
- Configuration
  - UIC: Co-Co
- Gauge: 1,520 mm (4 ft 11 27/32 in) (PKP LHS); 1,435 mm (4 ft 8 1/2 in) (other operators)
- Length: 17.55 m
- Width: 2.95 m
- Height: 4.62 m
- Fuel type: Diesel
- Engine type: GE 7FDL 12 EFI
- Traction motors: GE ED 118A
- Cylinders: 12
- Transmission: Diesel-Electric
- MU working: Yes
- Loco brake: Air
- Train brakes: Air
- Safety systems: SHP
Performance figures
- Maximum speed: 100 km/h
- Power output: 2,133 kW (2,860 hp)
Career
- Operators: PKP LHS/KB/PCC Rail
- Number in class: 27 (PKP LHS); 5 (Kolej Bałtycka); 15 (DB Cargo Polska)
- Nicknames: "Batman", "Darth Vader", "Robocop", "Transformer"
- First run: 2007
- Disposition: in service

PKP Class ST40 is a new class of cargo diesel-electric locomotives used by the PKP LHS broad-gauge division and various Polish private operators, designated 311D (standard gauge) or 311Da (broad gauge) by its manufacturer, Newag. The class is a heavily reconstructed Soviet M62 (PKP ST44), using only the underframe. The body is new, the main engine is a General Electric GE 7FDL12. Original engines were also modernised, as ED118 A GE. The class is much more economical and modern than a basic M62. The body has external walkways instead of an internal passage connecting the cabs. The first locomotive was modernised in 2007. As of April 2025, there were 48 class 311D completed, of which 27 are broad gauge 311Da units for PKP LHS, where they are designated ST40s.

== Specification ==
The locomotive is a modernisation of the popular Soviet locomotive M62 (ST44), which can be noticed by the chassis structure and carriages. The drive unit has been completely changed by installing a more efficient engine by the General Electric company which is placed in one place together with the main generator, compressor and fan. The most visible change is the complete change of the structure, the internal passageway between the cabins, having a driver's cab at each end and that the train has transitions outside with the jetties. By using the graft this has improved access to the engine. The front of the locomotive has been changed, giving a new look. The cabin has a new design and provides better working conditions.

== Service ==
The first locomotives were built in 2007.

Country	Owner	User	Type	Designation	Number units	Source
Poland	PKP LHS		311Da	ST40s	27	
Poland	Akiem	DB Cargo Polska	311D	311D	15	
Poland	Akiem	CTL Logistics	311D	311D	3	
Poland	Akiem	Colas Rail Polska	311D	311D	2	
Total:					47	

== Sources ==
- Pokropiński, Bogdan (2009). Lokomotywy spalinowe produkcji polskiej. Warsaw: WKiL. ISBN 978-83-206-1731-3.
