= Legacy High School =

Legacy High School may refer to:

Alphabetical by state

- Legacy High School (Arizona), Wickenburg, in the Canyon Athletic Association
- Legacy High School (South Gate, California)
- Legacy High School (Colorado), Broomfield
- Legacy High School (Florida), Port St. Lucie
- Legacy High School (North Las Vegas, Nevada)
- Child School and Legacy High School, Roosevelt Island, Manhattan, New York
- Legacy High School (North Dakota), Bismarck
- Legacy High School (Midland, Texas)
- Mansfield Legacy High School, Mansfield, Texas
- Southwest Legacy High School, San Antonio, Texas
- Tyler Legacy High School, Tyler, Texas
- Legacy High School (Marysville, Washington)
- Legacy High School (Vancouver, Washington)
