= Linia Hutnicza Szerokotorowa =

Russian gauge freight railway in Poland

Broad Gauge Metallurgy Line
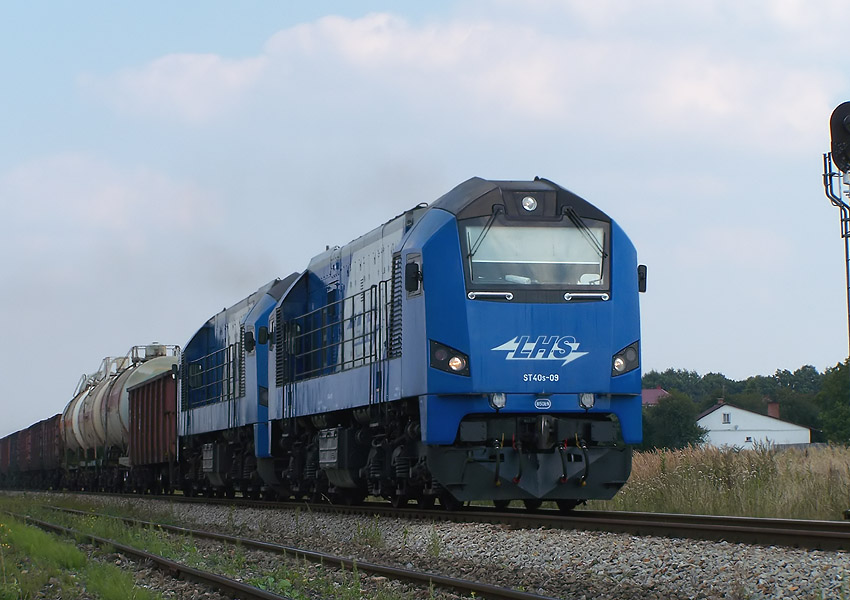
- ST40s on the Broad Gauge Metallurgy Line.

Overview
- Owner: PKP LHS Sp. z o.o.
- Locale: Southern Poland
- Termini: Bug River Bridge (Polish-Ukrainian border) east of Hrubieszów; Sławków
- Stations: 6
- Website: Official website

Service
- Type: Freight
- System: S64/R65 (main); UIC60
- Services: 1
- Route number: 65
- Operator: PKP LHS Sp. z o.o.

History
- Work began: 15 November 1976
- Opened: 30 November 1979

Technical
- Line length: 394.65 km (245.22 mi)
- Track length: 600 km (372.82 mi)
- Number of tracks: Single track
- Track gauge: 1,520 mm (4 ft 11 27/32 in) Russian gauge
- Electrification: No
- Operating speed: 80 km/h (50 mph)
Route map
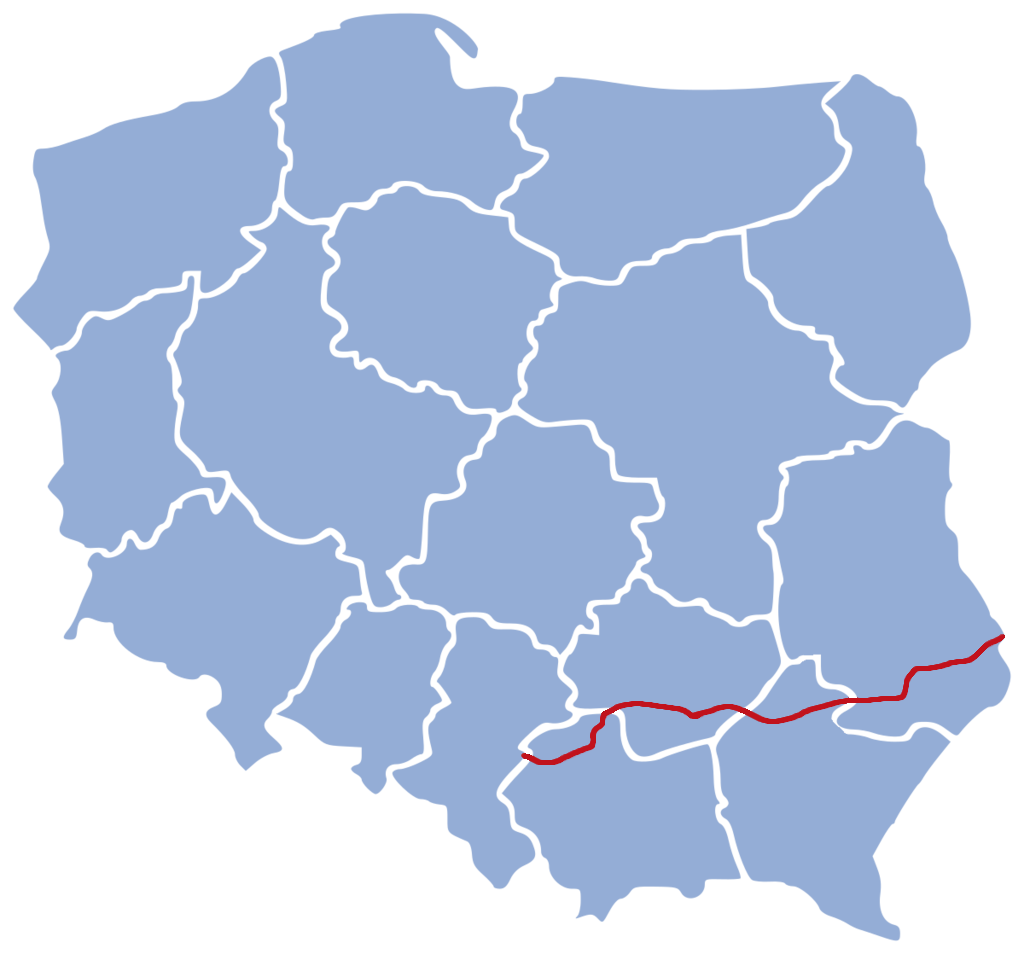

Broad Gauge Metallurgy Line (Polish: Linia Hutnicza Szerokotorowa, LHS) is the longest broad gauge railway line in Poland.

Except for this line and a few very short stretches near border crossings, Poland uses standard gauge. The single-track line runs for almost 400 km (250 mi) from the Polish-Ukrainian border crossing, just east of Hrubieszów, to Sławków Południowy (near Katowice). It is used only for freight, mainly iron ore (more than 50% of the volume of all goods transported), coal, petrochemical products, minerals and timber. It is the westernmost direct connection to the broad-gauge network of the former Soviet Union.

The line is designated by the national railway infrastructure manager PKP Polskie Linie Kolejowe as line number 65 and operated by a dedicated company PKP Linia Hutnicza Szerokotorowa which serves both as the infrastructure manager and traffic operator.

== History ==
In the 1970s the new giant Katowice Steelworks, then in its most prosperous period, required great quantities of iron ore. The main source was mines near Kryvyi Rih (then in the USSR, now in Ukraine), from where it was transported by rail via Medyka, Przemyśl, and Tarnów to Jaworzno Szczakowa. This line had inadequate capacity to carry the traffic.

The Polish State Railways PKP considered two options: to expand existing transshipment facilities at the border (the break of gauge point) and to upgrade existing railway line to three or even four tracks to allow more freight to be carried, or to build a new broad-gauge line to ease transit across the border. The latter was chosen, the advantages cited were that the newly-designed line could be built to accommodate the heaviest trains allowed to run on broad gauge network, there would be no need for an unfreezing facility at the border (in winters ore arrived frozen solid, presenting a challenge at the transshipment facility) and PKP needed not to use its own wagons to transport the goods on the Polish network as the Soviet wagons would be used for the entire transport. A broad gauge line with direct connection to the Soviet railway network also was of strategic importance, allowing Soviet troops to be quickly deployed closer to the Iron Curtain. The new line was designed by CBSiPBK (Central Bureau for Railway Construction Designs and Studies) in Warsaw, Józef Skorupski was the general designer, Twenty-one other design bureaus, eight geological companies and three technical universities took part in the project.

The line was built partly alongside existing standard-gauge lines which facilitated the construction works. To save costs, the line was routed through Roztocze National Park despite intensive lobbying by the park management.

The line opened in 1979 and was used to import iron ore from the USSR and export coal and sulphur. After the fall of communism and the economic changes of 1989, traffic greatly diminished. In 1994 export of sulphur stopped. Various schemes are being tried to increase its profitability, such as offering transport and forwarding services to all interested customers, leasing of commercial space and some rolling stock maintenance.

In the 1990s the LHS line was used by long-distance passenger trains to Russia and Ukraine. Initially, it was one pair of fast trains from Moscow to Olkusz, running every other day. In 1993, two pairs of trains Lviv – Zamość North and Moscow – Zamość North were added. In 1994, passenger trains on the LHS line ran only once a week on the route Kharkiv – Olkusz. Since the mid-90s, passenger trains have run sporadically as special trains.

In 2001 a new company within the PKP group, PKP Linia Hutnicza Szerokotorowa, was established to manage the line.

On 5 January 2020 the first intermodal container train from China used the line to reach the Sławków terminal, after traveling the 9,477 km (5,889 mi) route from Xi'an via Kazakhstan, Russia and Ukraine over 12 days. The company operating the line hopes that regular connections with China are established, taking advantage of the fact that its wide-gauge permits quick crossing of the border between Poland and Ukraine.

The company is in the process of installing warning lights (and, in some cases, barriers) at level crossings, extending the Hrubieszów LHS station and upgrading the train control systems. The works are due to be completed by the end of 2025.

Since 28 February 2022, special passenger trains carrying refugees from Ukraine, during their highest influx following the Russian invasion on their country, were run on the line to Olkusz, where a tent town has been established to accommodate them before they continue travel by standard gauge rail or by road.

== Names ==
The original, 1970s name was Linia Hutniczo-Siarkowa (Metallurgy-Sulphur Line), shortened to LHS.

Sometime in the 1990s, the name was changed to Linia Hutnicza Szerokotorowa (Broad Gauge Metallurgy Line). The new name retained the well-established acronym LHS but dropped the Sulphur part, as sulphur is no longer traded between Poland and the East.

== Facilities and rolling stock ==
There are 10 goods stations on the line: Hrubieszów LHS, Zamość Bortatycze LHS, Szczebrzeszyn LHS, Zwierzyniec Towarowy, Biłgoraj LHS, Wola Baranowska LHS, Staszów LHS, Gołuchów LHS, Sędziszów LHS, Sławków LHS. There is a bogie exchange facility at Sędziszów LHS and a SUW 2000 gauge changing facility at Zamość Bortatycze LHS. Zamość Bortatycze LHS is also home to a locomotive depot and at Sędziszów LHS there is a wagon depot. There are two sidings: one at Sławków LHS to the iron ore unloading facility, owned and operated by Katowice Steelworks, and another, unused since 1994, at Grzybów to the Siarkopol sulfur mine. In the 1990s there existed also two passenger stations at Zamość Północny and Olkusz. Near the Sławków LHS station there exists Euroterminal Sławków, a major intermodal terminal, owned and operated by PKP Cargo. It is the westernmost point of the Broad gauge railway network.

A new goods station is being built on the site of former passenger stop Zamość Północ, to be named Zamość Majdan.

Stations
Station	Standard gauge siding	Customs	Container facility	Warehouse	Other facilities / notes	Location
Hrubieszów LHS	Yes	Yes	No	No	Border checkpoint, phytosanitary and veterinary checkpoint	50°47′28″N 23°55′05″E
Zamość Majdan LHS					Under construction	50°44′42″N 23°16′01″E
Zamość Bortatycze LHS	Yes	No	Yes	No	SUW 2000 gauge changing facility, locomotive depot	50.741°N 23.186°E
Szczebrzeszyn LHS	No	No	Yes	Yes	Handling of all types of cargo except liquid fuels and dangerous goods	50.668°N 22.973°E
Biłgoraj LHS	No	No	No	No	Handling of all types of cargo except dangerous, flammable and toxic goods	50.552°N 22.733°E
Wola Baranowska LHS	Yes	No	Yes	No	Bonded warehouse	50.434°N 21.567°E
Staszów LHS	Yes	No	No	No		50.550°N 21.158°E
Grzybów LHS	No	No	No	No	Siding to Siarkopol sulfur mine (unused), no other facilities	50.530°N 21.057°E
Gołuchów LHS	Yes	No	No	No	Liquefied gases handling facility	50.611°N 20.658°E
Sędziszów LHS	Yes	No	No	No	Bogie exchange facility, wagon depot, no other facilities	50.578°N 20.091°E
Olkusz LHS (under construction)	No	No	No	No	No	50.289°N 19.604°E
Sławków LHS	Yes	Yes	Yes	Yes	Bonded warehouses, facilities for handling liquefied gases, liquid fuels, semitrailers and lorries piggybacked on flat wagons	50.275°N 19.365°E
Euroterminal Sławków	Yes	Yes	Yes	Yes	Bonded warehouse, facilities for handling liquid chemicals, metallurgical products, pig iron, glass, semitrailers piggybacked on flat wagons	50.282°N 19.309°E
All stations are equipped to handle granular bulk cargo, breakbulk cargo and timber, except as indicated by "no other facilities".

LHS owns a number of M62 (classed ST44) and TEM2 (classed SM48) diesel locomotives, a number of them underwent comprehensive rebuilding to types 311Da (classed ST40s) and 16D (classed ST48), respectively. The company owns a number of wagons but mostly operates rolling stock by foreign customers (Belarusian, Russian and Ukrainian).

== Future proposals ==
- Electrification - The section from the border to Hrubieszów is to be electrified first in conjunction with the electrification of the connecting border – Izov – Kovel line in Ukraine. Will be electrified at either 25 kV AC (as on connecting lines in Ukraine), or at 3 kV DC (the Polish national standard)
- Track doubling on the entire route.
- Siding lengthening on the every stations and yards.
- Rebuild overhead bridges (to make wider and higher clearances) and realignment of the adjacent standard gauge tracks.
- A roughly 80-kilometre-long (50 mi) extension through the Upper Silesian Industrial Region from Sławków to Gliwice or Kędzierzyn-Koźle, together with a proposed Danube–Odra–Elbe Canal which would allow transshipment through inland waterways.
- New intermodal terminals. One will be built at Wola Baranowska.
- Acquisition of 200 80ft container flat wagons.

=== Proposed upgrade technical specifications ===
- Electrification voltage: 25 kV 50 Hz AC overhead lines
- Minimum overhead wiring height: 6.75 m (22.1 ft) above rail
- Normal overhead wiring height: 7.1 m (23 ft) above rail
- Minimum track center spacing: 4.7 m (15 ft) (for the straight lines)
- Minimum length of the sidings/passing loops: 1,500 m (4,900 ft)

=== Proposed new lines ===
No concrete plans whatsoever have been made to build these lines, however they have been suggested in various publications.

- Line 65 extension: Sławków - Gliwice - Kędzierzyn-Koźle - Görlitz - Oberhausen
- Line 63: Dorohusk - Chelm - Zawadowka - Lublin - Warsaw - Gdansk - Karlskrona - Kalmar - Oskarshamn - Stockholm

== See also ==
- Uzhhorod–Košice broad-gauge track
- Rail transport in Poland
