= PKP Linia Hutnicza Szerokotorowa =

Polish railway company

PKP Linia Hutnicza Szerokotorowa Sp. z o.o.

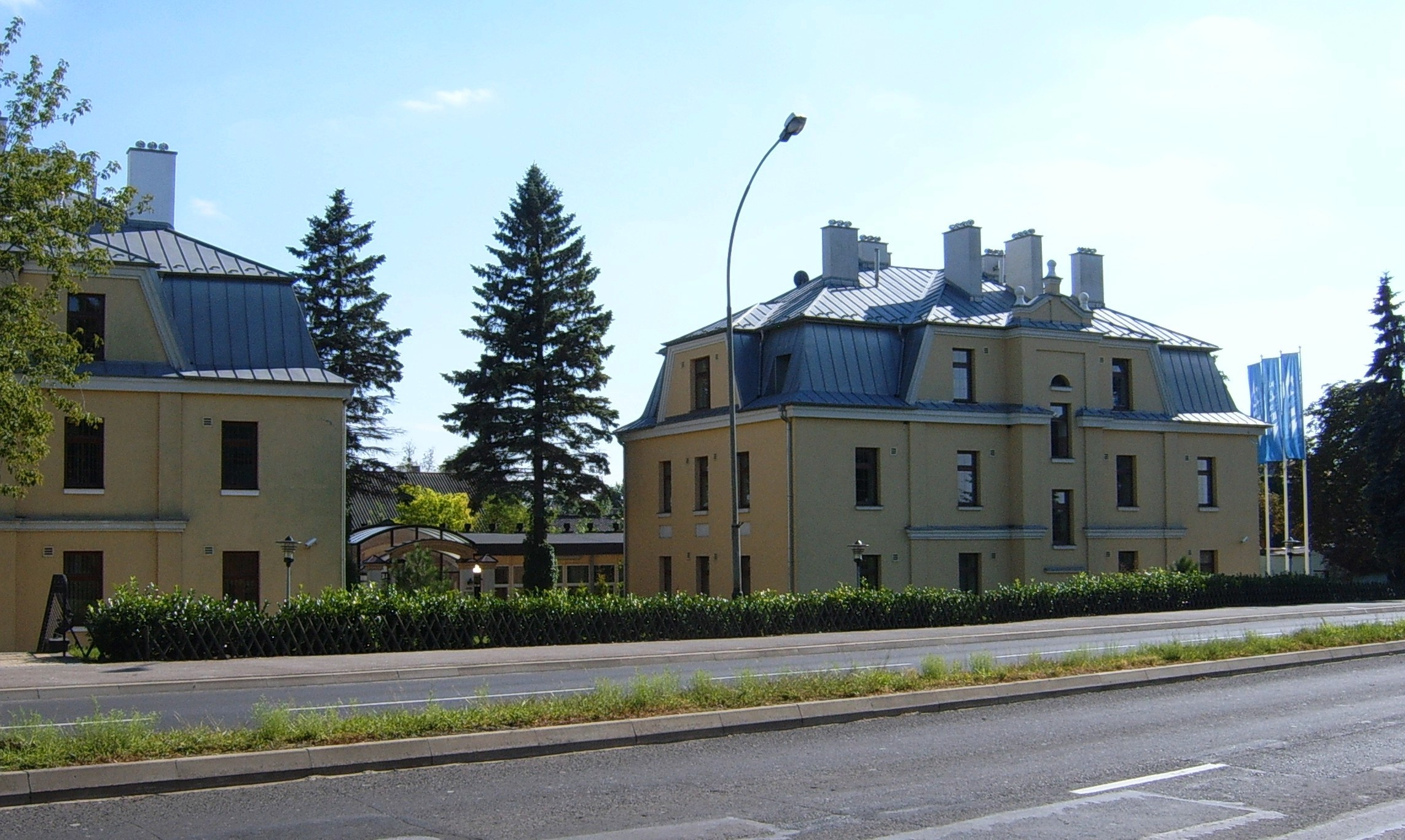
- Company type: Spółka z ograniczoną odpowiedzialnością
- Industry: Rail transport
- Founded: 1 December 2000
- Headquarters: Zamość, Poland
- Area served: Silesian, Lesser Poland, Świętokrzyskie, Subcarpathian and Lublin voivoderships
- Key people: Zbigniew Tracichleb; CEO; Mirosław Antonowicz; Chairman of the supervisory board
- Services: Freight transport Broad Gauge Metallurgy Line maintenance
- Revenue: 427.9 million zł ▼ (2019)
- Net income: 52.4 million zł ▼ (2019)
- Total assets: 570.2 million zł ▲ (2019)
- Number of employees: 1324 ▲ (2019)
- Website: Official website

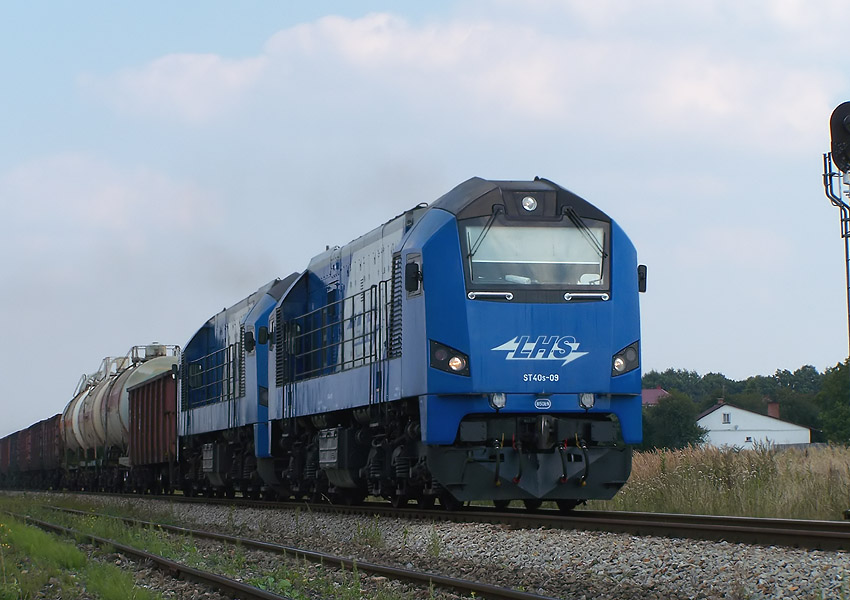
PKP class ST40 locomotive operated by LHS

PKP Linia Hutnicza Szerokotorowa sp. z o.o. is a company in the PKP Group which manages and operates in Poland the Linia Hutnicza Szerokotorowa (Broad Gauge Metallurgy Line), which runs for 394.65 km (245.22 mi) from the Polish-Ukrainian border in Izow-Hrubieszów to Sławków Południowy (near Katowice).

The company was established on 1 December 2000 as part of the break-up of the once-unitary Polish State Railways JSC, and began operations on 1 July 2001. As of 2019, the company transported about 10 million tonnes of freight annually. The company owns 77 diesel locomotives (mainline and shunters), 95 wagons, 50 broad gauge bogies, and 168 standard gauge bogies.

== See also ==
- PKP Group
- Rail transport in Poland
