= PKP class ST43 =

ST43
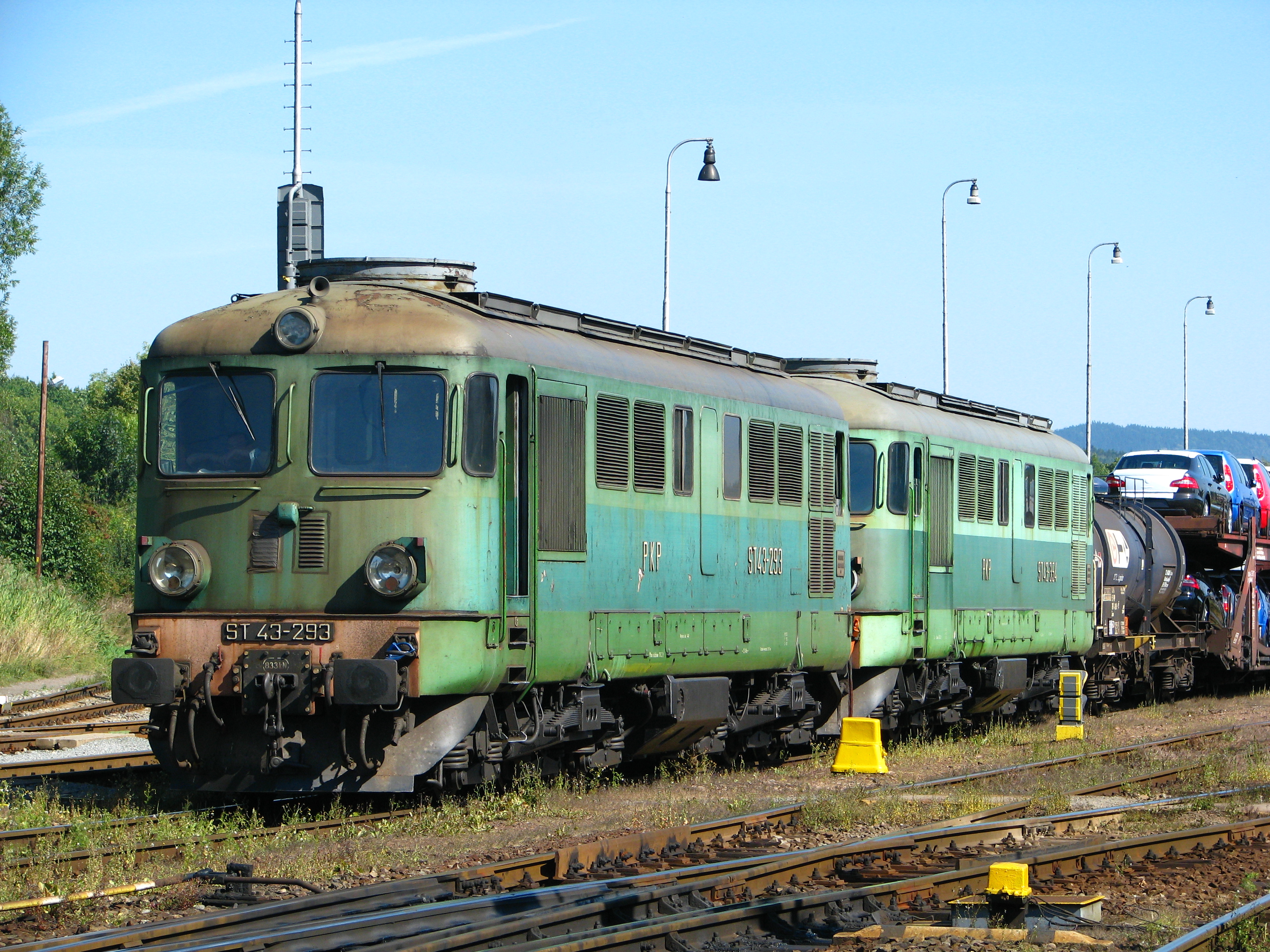
- ST43 in service in 2008
Type and origin
- Power type: Diesel-Electric
- Builder: Electroputere (Romania)
- Model: 060DA
- Build date: 1965-1978
- Total produced: 422
Specifications
- Configuration
  - UIC: Co′Co′
- Gauge: 1,435 mm (4 ft 8 1/2 in)
- Driver dia.: 1,100 mm
- Length: 17,000 mm
- Width: 3,000 mm
- Loco weight: 116.4 t
- Fuel type: Diesel Fuel
- Fuel capacity: 4,880 l
- Engine type: UCM Reșița-Sulzer 12LDA28
- Transmission: Electric
- Loco brake: Knorr/Oerlikon
- Train brakes: Knorr
Performance figures
- Maximum speed: 100 km/h
- Power output: 1,544 kW 2,070 horsepower
- Tractive effort: 314 kN
Career
- Operators: PKP
- Class: ST43
- Nicknames: Rumun (from their Romanian manufacture)

ST43 is the name for a Romanian diesel locomotive, produced by Electroputere, exported to and operating in Poland. It was made for the purpose of heavy transport.

== History ==
In the early 1960s a need appeared in Poland for urgent introduction of locos able to haul heavy freight. This was caused mainly by the intensification of transport on south–north line, especially from the Silesian coal mines to Szczecin and Świnoujście harbours. Lack of experience in building diesel locos for that purpose was the reason why the first ones had to be bought from Romania.

=== Introduction ===
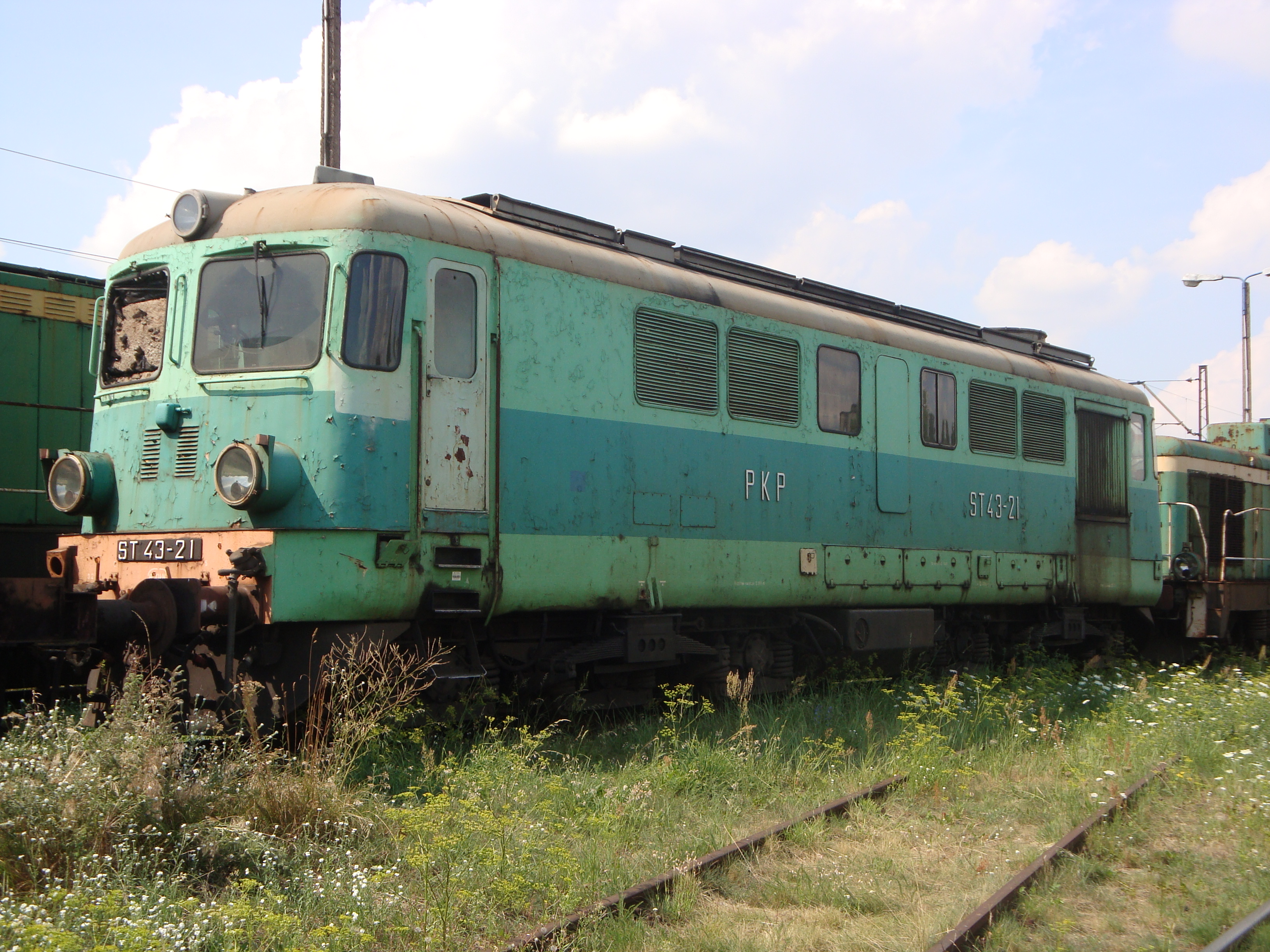

In March 1965 first 30 items of 060DA locomotives (factory number of ST43) were introduced into Poznań and Szczecin, according to agreement with Romanian producer. Good results of tests allowed next deliveries to be brought to Poland. Until 1978 a total number of 422 locomotives were operating in Poland.

=== Production ===
Locomotives numbers	Producer	Years of production	Quantity
001 - 422	Electroputere	1965–1978	422

=== Present days ===
In the 1990s, the ST43 appeared to be no longer necessary as most of the tracks serviced by it were electrified. Most of the units were withdrawn, the rest were sent for use on passenger and light transport trains.

== Locomotive assignment ==
Locomotives numbers	Operator	Remarks
27 164 189 304	Białystok	
201 347 395	Bydgoszcz	
04 05 22 35 80 100 114 117 144 170 185 190 200 208 216 223 235 248 257 258 259 264 267 269 273 278 334 355 365 371 382 386 406	Czerwieńsk	
217 229 265	Gdynia	
19 68 97 116 177 218 221 227 228 239 290 320 329 339 340 341 345 375 380 388 389 398 399 400 402 404 408 415 416 417	Nowy Sącz	
69 128 275 292 318 327 333 336 344 349	Olsztyn	
21 55 142 174 214 231 253 255 260 274 277 381 403	Poznań	
72 137 187 224 361	Skarżysko	
83 103 165 193 195 199 338 357	Szczecin	
63 71 77 98 102 108 115 132 135 140 160 171 194 198 206 226 238 241 242 245 247 251 252 254 263 270 272 291 293 295 298 302 303 305 312 314 316 317 322 325 328 332 335 351 352 353 354 356 358 359 364 366 367 368 377 378 390 391 392 396 397	Wrocław	
407 413 414 422	Żurawica	
01	Chabówka	For renovation in locomotive museum
02	Silesian Railway Museum	Wreck

== Nicknames ==
This loco used to be called by the following names:

- Rumun (lit. 'Romanian') - from the country of origin.

== See also ==
- Polish locomotives designation
