= Pogoria =

Pogoria may refer to

- Pogoria (lakes), a set of four lakes in Poland.
- Pogoria (ship), a Polish Sail Training Ship launched in 1980.
- Pogoria (train), a Polish named express train.
