= Memorial to the Heroes of the Red Flags =

Monument in Dąbrowa Górnicza, Poland

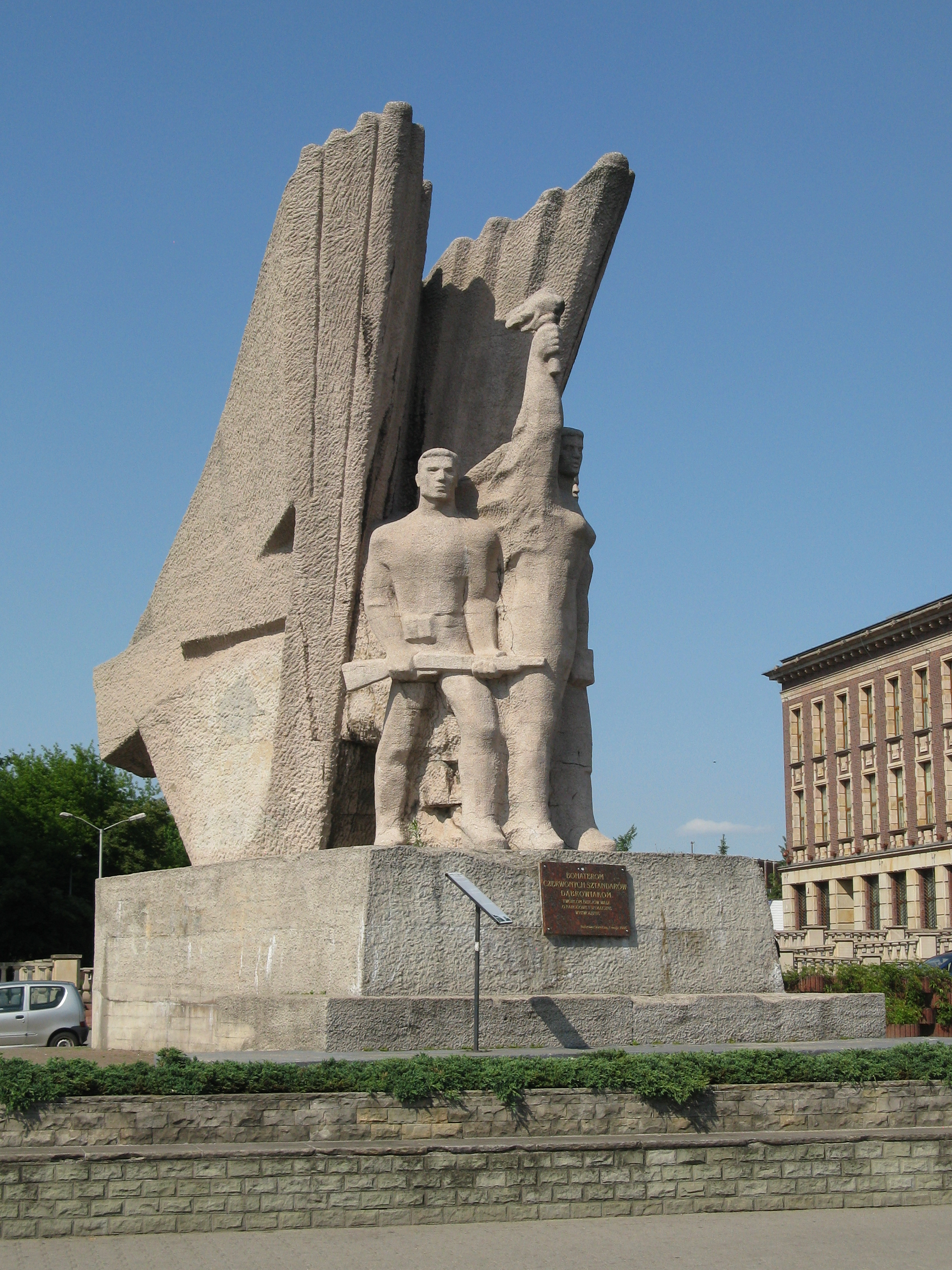
- The sculpture in 2018.
- Interactive map of Memorial to the Heroes of the Red Flags
- Location: Freedom Square, Dąbrowa Górnicza, Poland
- Coordinates: 50°19′32.6″N 19°11′14.6″E
- Designer: Augustyn Dyrda
- Type: Sculpture
- Material: Concrete
- Opening date: 8 November 1970

The Memorial to the Heroes of the Red Flags (Polish: Pomnik Bohaterom Czerwonych Sztandarów) is a large concrete sculpture in Dąbrowa Górnicza, Silesian Voivodeship, Poland, placed at the Freedom Square, in front of the Basin Palace of Culture. It was designed by Augustyn Dyrda and unveiled on 8 November 1970, for the 53rd anniversary of the October Revolution in Russia. It was dedicated to the insurgents of the Polish Socialist Party, who, during the 1905 revolution in the Kingdom of Poland, declared independence of Dąbrowa Basin, lasting for the following 10 days. The monument consists of three large statues of revolutionaries, standing in front of two large flags flying in the wind, with their poles forming the V sign.

== History ==
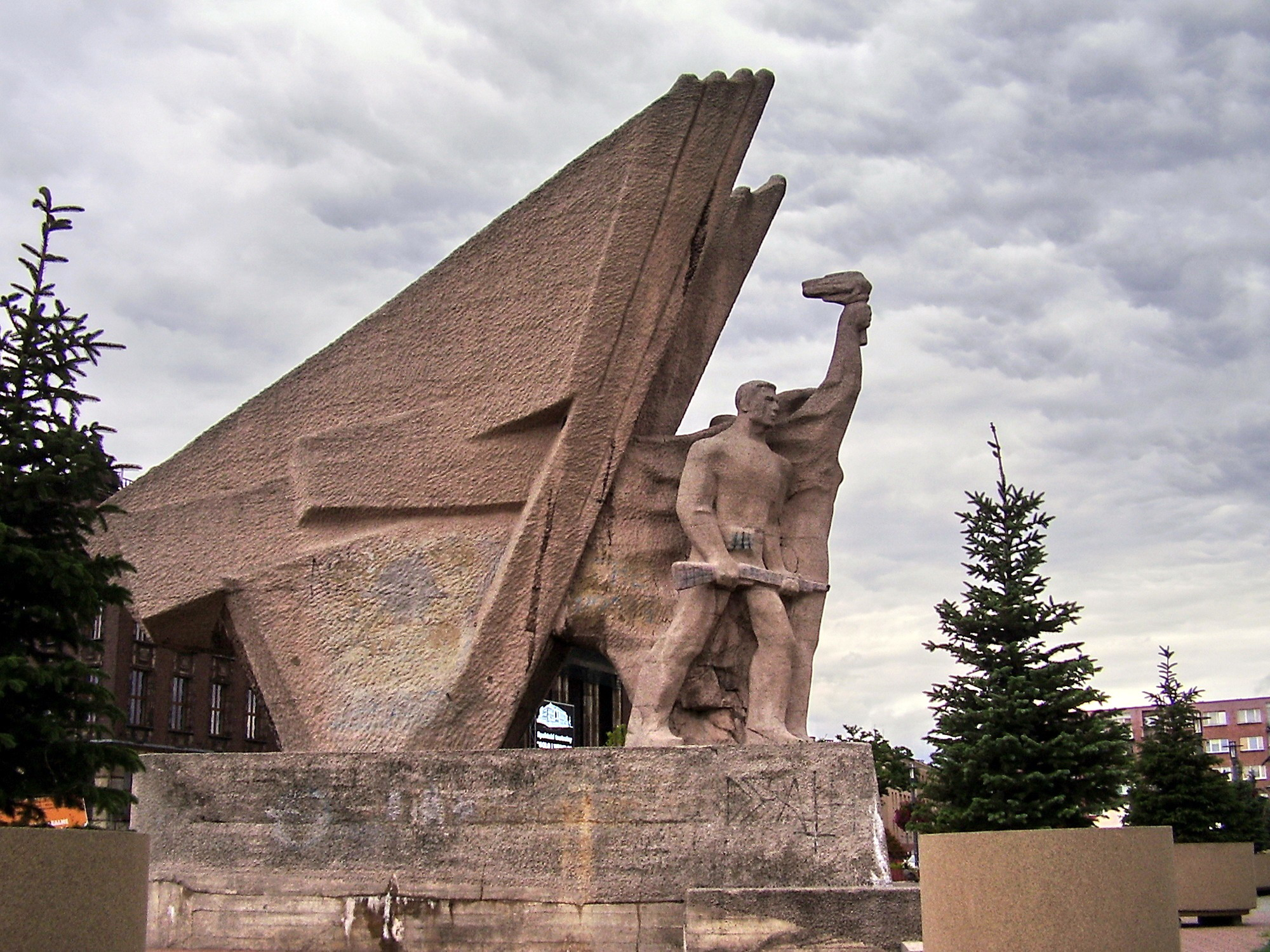
The monument as seen from the side.

The sculpture was designed by Augustyn Dyrda, and unveiled on 8 November 1970, for the 53rd anniversary of the October Revolution in Russia. It was dedicated to the insurgents of the Polish Socialist Party, who, during the 1905 revolution in the Kingdom of Poland, declared independence of Dąbrowa Basin, lasting for the following 10 days. The name referred to the song "The Standard of Revolt" (also known as "The Red Flag"), which was a popular anthem among the insurgents.

In 1990, due to its connotations with the communist regieme in Poland, it was planned to destroy the sculpture with explosive materials. However, the decision was protested by the local inhabitants, who, painted the monument with flowers and peace signs, dedicating it to musicians Jimi Hendrix and Kurt Cobain. The statue was constantly guarded by the protesters, who managed to ward of its destruction. During the manifestations, they wrote on it the following text in a mix of English and Polish:

Original text

Jimiemu Hendrixowi
Kurtowi Cobainowi
Make love not war, war is over
Wszystkim, których kochają wolność

Translation:
English translation

To Jimi Hendrix
To Kurt Cobain
Make love not war, war is over
To all, who love freedom

The monument survived in that state until 2006, when it was cleaned. On 1 May of that year, a commemorative plaque was installed, bearing the following inscription:

Original text

Bohaterom czerwonych sztandarów
Dąbrowiakom
Twórcom dziejów walk o narodowe i społeczne wyzwolenie

Translation:
English translation

To the heroes of the Red Flags
To the inhabitants of Dąbrowa Górnicza
To the creators of the history of the struggle for national and social liberation

In 2012, near the sculpture, was also unveiled the statue of Jimi Hendrix.

On 27 October 2018, several hundred people protested again to preserve the monument, after the Institute of National Remembrance stated that it should be removed. It was wrapped in a protective material and painted over.

Currently, the sculpture is listed on the municipal heritage list of Silesian Voivodeship.

== Characteristics ==
The monument consists of a large concrete sculpture. In the front, it has three large statues, depicting working-class socialist revolutionaries. In the first row stands a woman holding a burning torch in her right hand, above her head. Behind her stand two men, with the one to her right holding a riffle, and to her left, a book. Behind them are two large flags waving in the wind, with their poles forming the shape of the letter V, alluding to the victory sign.
