= Zakawie =

Historical settlement in Poland

Coordinates: 50°18′52″N 19°20′16″E

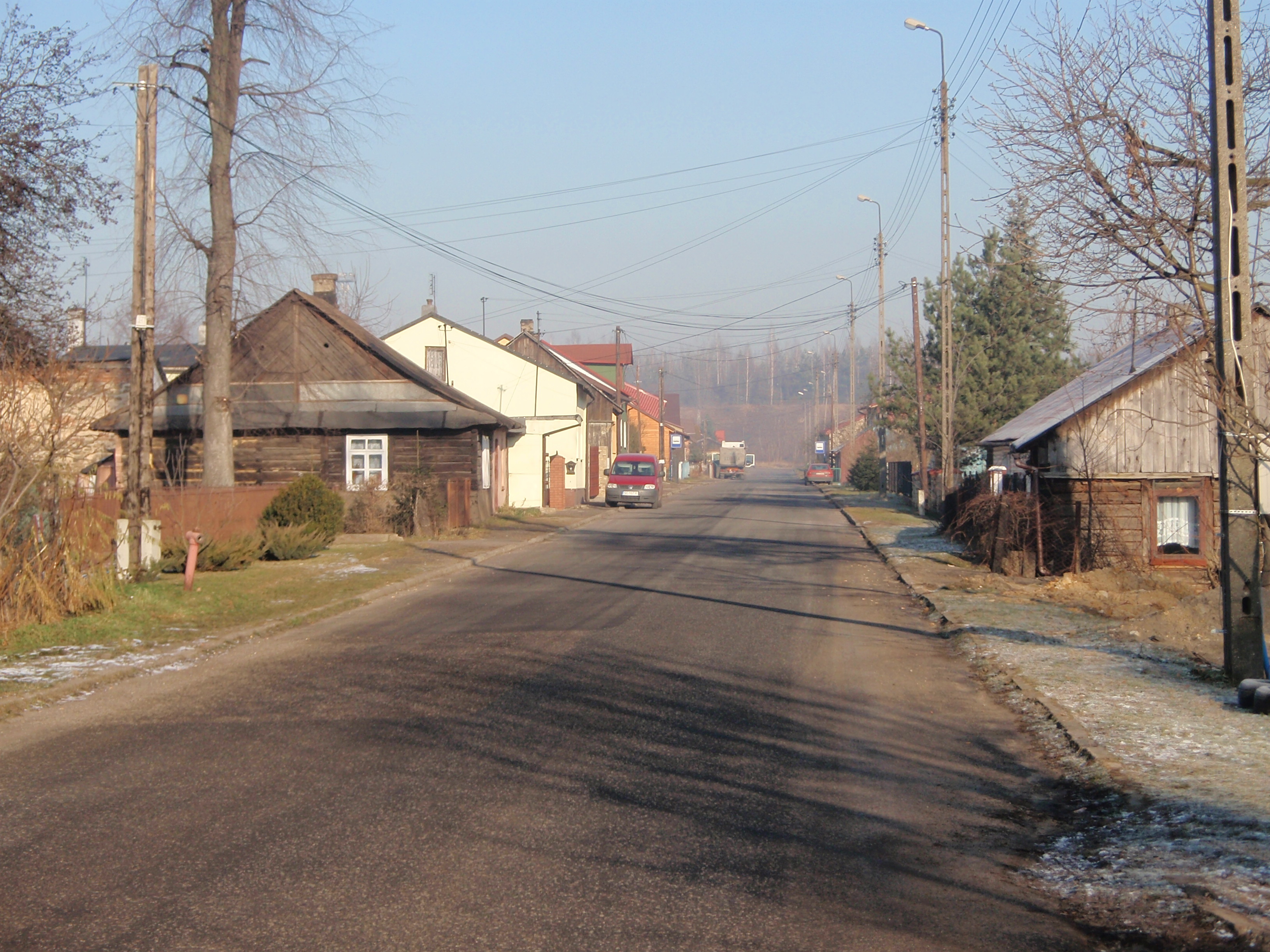
Zakawie

Zakawie [zaˈkavjɛ] – a historical settlement in Poland, presently a street under the same name in Strzemieszyce Małe (a district of Dąbrowa Górnicza). Established in the 1820s, provided housing for workers of the zinc mine "Leonidas" in Sławków. According to the Geographical Dictionary of the Kingdom of Poland, in 1895 the settlement numbered 23 houses and 257 inhabitants.
