= Walter Spitzer (artist) =

French painter (1927–2021)

- Born: 14 June 1927; Cieszyn, Second Polish Republic
- Died: 13 April 2021 (aged 93); Paris, France
- Occupation: Painter

Walter Spitzer (14 June 1927 – 13 April 2021) was a Polish-born French artist and painter. He was a survivor of the Holocaust.

== Biography ==
Spitzer was born in Cieszyn on 14 June 1927. He lost his father, Samuel, who died in February 1940 due to illness, and his mother, Gretta, to the Nazis. In June 1940, his family fled to Strzemieszyce Wielkie, where he worked as a photographer and welder. That year, his brother, Harry, was arrested by the Germans. Walter himself was arrested in 1943 at the age of 16 and was sent to Gross-Rosen. He was then sent to Blechhammer and later Auschwitz, where he was separated from his mother. He was tattooed with the number 78489. He then participated in the death marches in January 1945 before his liberation by the United States Army.

After he was freed, Spitzer moved to France and studied at the Beaux-Arts de Paris. He then spent his career as a painter, while continuing to preserve the memory of the Holocaust.

Walter Spitzer died in Paris on 13 April 2021, at the age of 93, from COVID-19.

== Works ==
=== Book ===
- Les Auschwitz : témoignages (2012)

=== Lithography ===
- L'Odyssée (1969)

=== Monuments ===
- Monument aux victimes des persécutions racistes et antisémites (15th arrondissement of Paris, 1995)
