= Statue of Jimi Hendrix (Dąbrowa Górnicza) =

Sculpture in Dąbrowa Górnicza, Poland

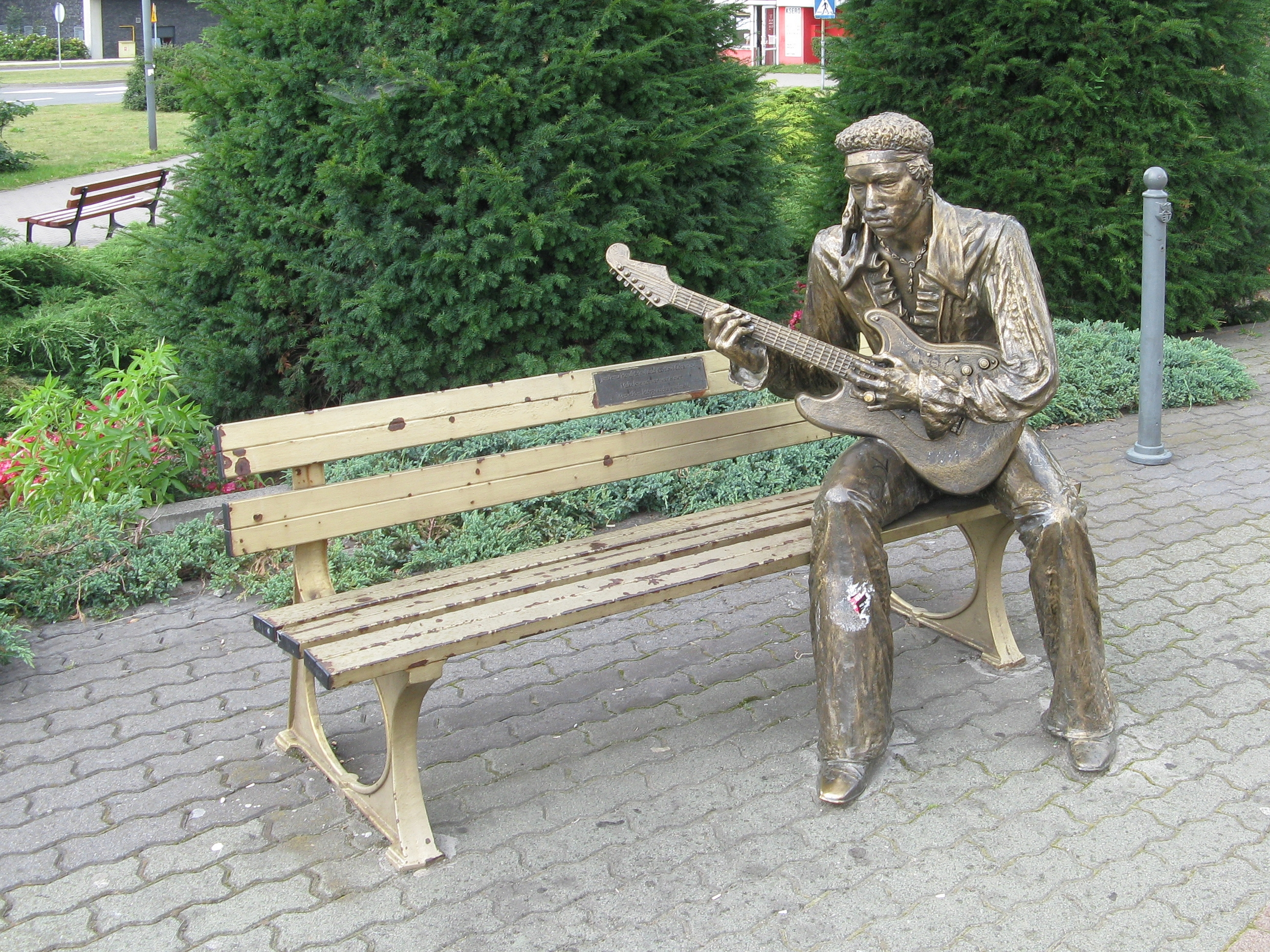
- The sculpture in 2018.
- Interactive map of Statue of Jimi Hendrix
- Location: Freedom Square, Dąbrowa Górnicza, Poland
- Coordinates: 50°19′32.71″N 19°11′13.8″E
- Designer: Adam Szczepański
- Type: Statue
- Material: Bronze
- Opening date: 20 September 2012
- Dedicated to: Jimi Hendrix

The statue of Jimi Hendrix (Polish: Pomnik Jimiego Hendrixa) is a bronze statue in Dąbrowa Górnicza, Silesian Voivodeship, Poland, placed at the Freedom Square. It was designed by Adam Szczepański and unveiled on 20 September 2012. It depicts Jimi Hendrix, a 20th-century rock singer-songwriter and musician, sitting on a bench, while playing on his electric guitar.

== History ==
In 1990, during the protests to prevent the removal of the Memorial to the Heroes of the Red Flags, protestors painted the sculpture with flowers and peace signs, and dedicated it to musicians Jimi Hendrix and Kurt Cobain. They wrote on it text, which, when translated, read "To Jimi Hendrix; To Kurt Cobain; Make love not war; War is over; To all, who love freedom". The monument was preserved, and remained in its painted form until 2006 when it was cleaned.

On 20 September 2012, nearby was unveiled the statue of Jimi Hendrix, designed by Adam Szczepański.

== Design ==
The bronze statue depicts Jimi Hendrix, a 20th-century rock singer-songwriter and musician, sitting on a bench, while playing on his electric guitar. The bench includes a commemorative plaque, which reads:

Original text

Jimi’emu Hendrix’owi and Kurt’owi Cobain’owi.
Make love not war, war is over.
Wszystkim, których kochają wolność.

Translation:
English translation

To Jimi Hendrix and Kurt Cobain.
Make love not war, war is over.
To all, who love freedom.
