= Dąbrowa Górnicza railway station =

Railway station in Dąbrowa Górnicza, Poland

Dąbrowa Górnicza
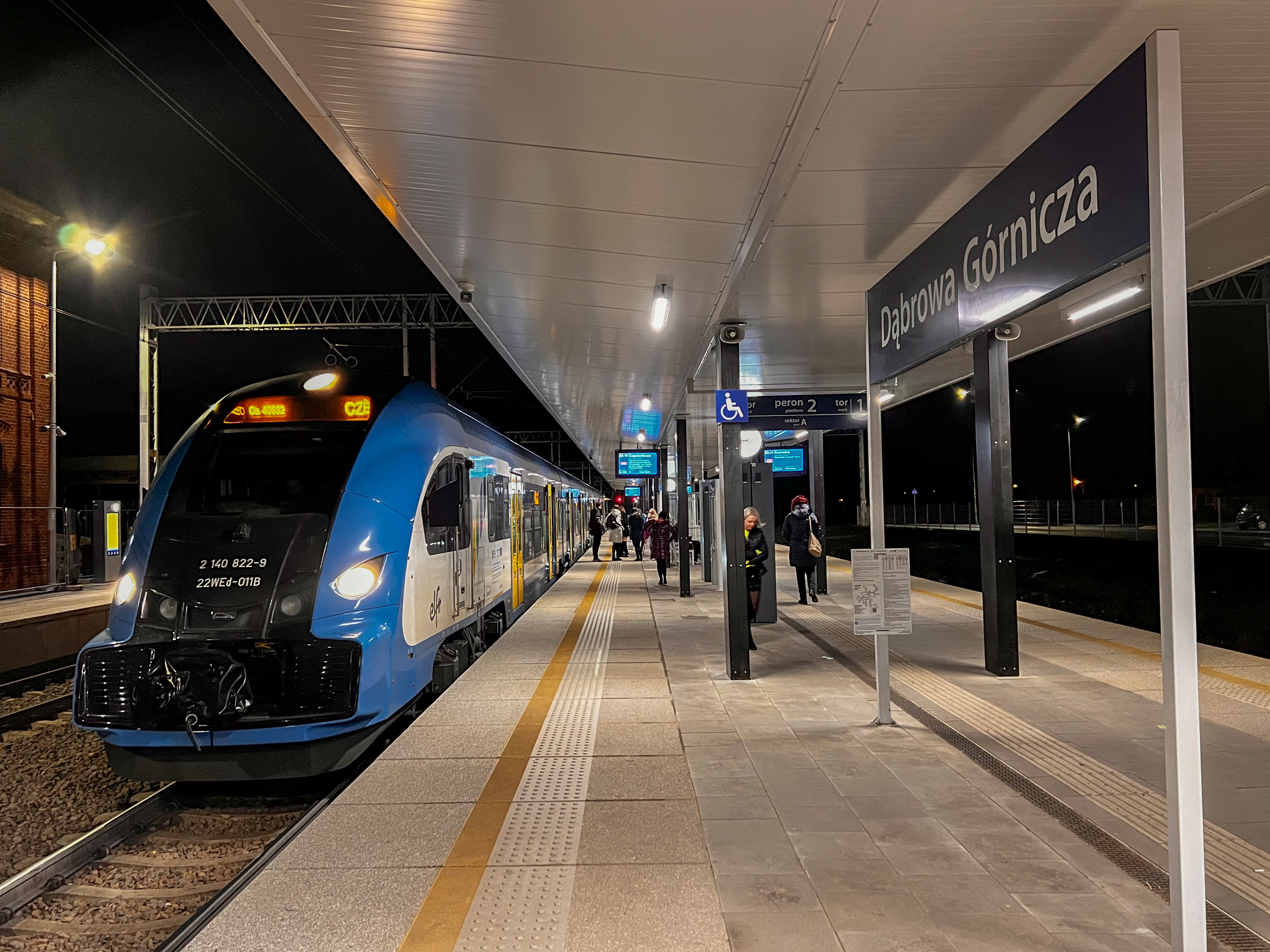
- Dąbrowa Górnicza railway station platform after modernization in 2022

General information
- Location: Dąbrowa Górnicza, Silesian; Poland
- Coordinates: 50°19′48″N 19°11′08″E
- Owner: Polskie Koleje Państwowe S.A.
- Line: 1 Warszawa Zachodnia – Katowice; 62 Tunel – Sosnowiec Główny
- Platforms: 1
- Tracks: 2

Construction
- Structure type: Building: Yes

Services
Preceding station	PKP Intercity	Following station
Będzin Miasto towards Bielsko-Biała Główna or Racibórz	IC	Zawiercie towards Olsztyn Główny
Preceding station	KŚ	Following station
Będzin Ksawera towards Gliwice	S1	Dąbrowa Górnicza Gołonóg towards Częstochowa
Będzin Ksawera towards Tychy Lodowisko	S41	Dąbrowa Górnicza Gołonóg towards Częstochowa
Location

Dąbrowa Górnicza railway station is a railway station in Dąbrowa Górnicza, located in the Silesian Voivodeship, Poland. The station is situated in the city center at Kolejowa Street 3, close to key landmarks, including the Palace of Culture of the Zagłębie (550 m), Pogoria Shopping Center (600 m), and Fabryka Pełna Życia (400 m).

It was established in the 19th century as a through station on the Warsaw–Vienna railway. It serves as the city’s main station, providing direct train connections to Warsaw, Białystok, Częstochowa, and Bielsko-Biała. As of 2012, it is served by Polregio (local and InterRegio services) and PKP Intercity (TLK services). InterRegio and TLK services are on the line between Warsaw and Katowice. Trains of nearly all categories depart from here, including TLK (Twoje Linie Kolejowe), PKP Intercity, Express InterCity, and regional trains operated by Silesian Railways. The station is an important transport hub, connecting Dąbrowa Górnicza to other cities in the Upper Silesian metropolitan area and the Upper Silesian-Zagłębie Metropolis.

== Train services ==
The station is served by the following services (selection):

- Intercity services (IC) Olsztyn - Warszawa - Skierniewice - Częstochowa - Katowice - Bielsko-Biała
- Intercity services (IC) Olsztyn - Warszawa - Skierniewice - Częstochowa - Katowice - Gliwice - Racibórz

== Connections ==
Directly adjacent to the station is a transportation hub featuring a four-stand bus stop, Dąbrowa Górnicza Dworzec PKP, serving nine municipal bus lines and one metropolitan line. These routes connect the station with the city center, various districts of Dąbrowa Górnicza, and neighboring cities.

The station area also includes a Park and Ride (P+R) parking lot, a Bike and Ride (B+R) facility, a taxi stand, Kiss and Ride (K+R) parking spaces, and station no. 27768 of the metropolitan bike-sharing system, Metrorower.

Within 100 meters north of the station, there are additional bus stops at Dąbrowa Górnicza Limanowskiego. About 700 meters south of the station is the city’s main transportation hub, Dąbrowa Górnicza Centrum, which serves 27 bus lines and 3 tram lines operated by the Metropolitan Transport Authority (ZTM), along with private transportation services.
