= Strzemieszyce Małe =

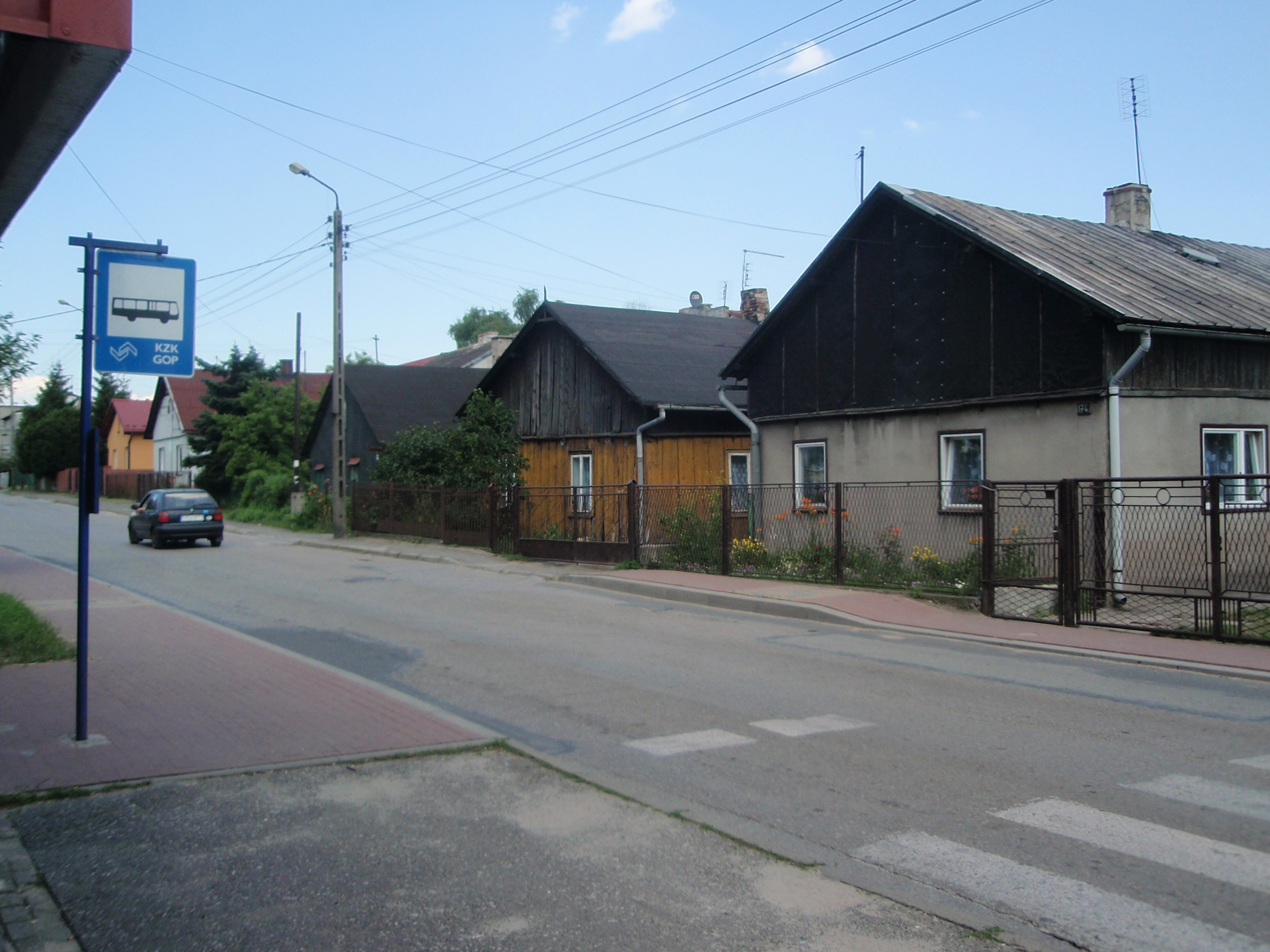
- Strzemieszyce Małe, Główna Street

- Location within Poland
- Coordinates: 50°19′42″N 19°19′11″E
- Country: Poland
- Voivodeship: Silesian
- City-county Dąbrowa Górnicza: Dąbrowa Górnicza
- Established: 14th century

Area
  - City: 8.89 km^{2} (3.43 sq mi)

Population
  - Metro: 3,029,000 Katowice urban area
- Time zone: UTC+1 (CET)
  - Summer (DST): UTC+2 (CEST)
- Postal code: 41-301
- Area code: +48 32
- Car plates: SD

Strzemieszyce Małe – a district (dzielnica) of Dąbrowa Górnicza (since 1975) in the Silesian Voivodeship, Poland. Located between Strzemieszyce Wielkie and Łosień, 10.8 km eastwards from the town center, separated from Strzemieszyce Wielkie by the National Road. Before 1973 an independent rural commune (gmina).

== History ==
The first written record of the village name (in Latin Strmyeschycze minor) comes from the early 14th century. The village belonged along with Strzemieszyce Wielkie to the bishops of Kraków and was administered as part of the Sławków estates until 1790. An elementary school was established in 1820. In 1890 the village numbered 148 households. Two calamine mines ("Anna" and "Kawia Góra") operated here in the 19th century.

== See also ==
- Zakawie

== Bibliography ==
1. Jan Przemsza-Zieliński: Historia Zagłębia Dąbrowskiego, Sosnowiec 1992.
2. Arkadiusz Rybak: Z dziejów oświaty na terenie Strzemieszyc Małych 1820 – 2000, Dąbrowa Górnicza 2002, ISBN 83-909836-0-5.
3. tegoż: Z dziejów parafii i życia religijnego Strzemieszyc Małych, w: Jan Kmiotek, Dariusz Kmiotek, Arkadiusz Rybak (red.), Echo dawnych Strzemieszyc, cz. VI, Dąbrowa Górnicza 2001, ISBN 83-917750-2-X, s. 44.
