= Kazimierz Imieliński =

Polish physician (1929–2010)

- Born: 6 December 1929; Dąbrowa Górnicza, Poland
- Died: 16 July 2010 (aged 80)
- Education: Jagiellonian University Medical College
- Known for: Pioneer of sexology in Poland
- Scientific career
- Fields: Sexology, gender studies

Kazimierz Imieliński (6 December 1929 – 16 July 2010) was a Polish physician and the “father of Polish sexology”. Some of his monographs on sexology have been translated into foreign languages, including Czech and Russian.
