= Ujejsce =

Coordinates: 50.4000°N 19.2500°E

Ujejsce is a dzielnica (borough, district) of Dąbrowa Górnicza, a city in Poland.

== List of street names in Ujejsce ==
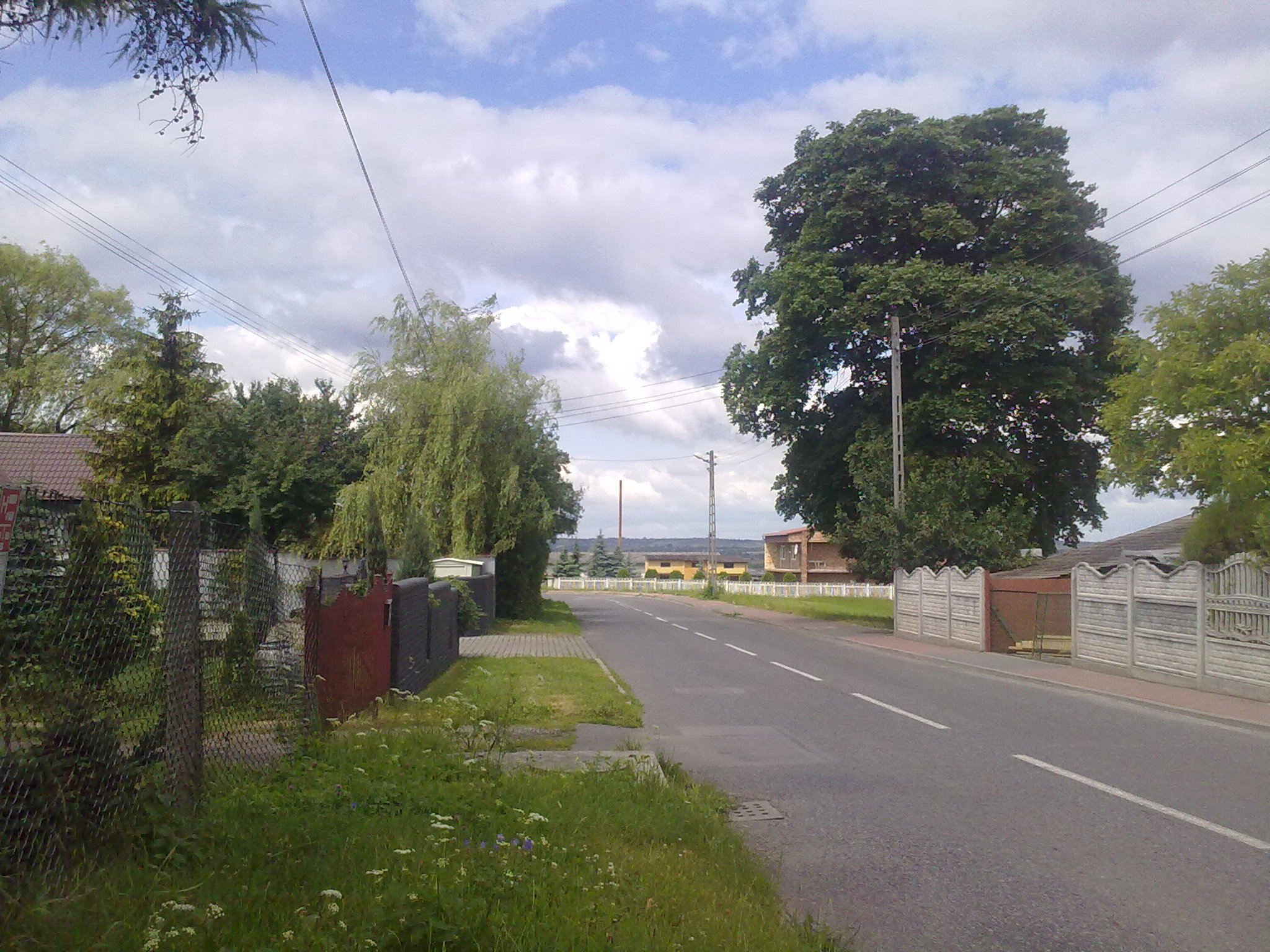
Kryniczna Street in Ujejsce

- 40-lecia
- Broniewskiego
- Dobrawy
- Dymniki
- Gruszeckieoo
- Handlowa
- Karsowska
- Kryniczna
- Kwiatowa
- Mieszka I
- Morgowa
- Ogrodników
- Olimpijska
- Podbagienko
- Podbuczyny
- Przełajowa
- Traktowa
- Ujejska
- Wysoka
- Wyzwolenia
