= Pogoria (lakes) =

Set of four lakes in Poland

Coordinates: 50°21′29″N 19°14′11″E

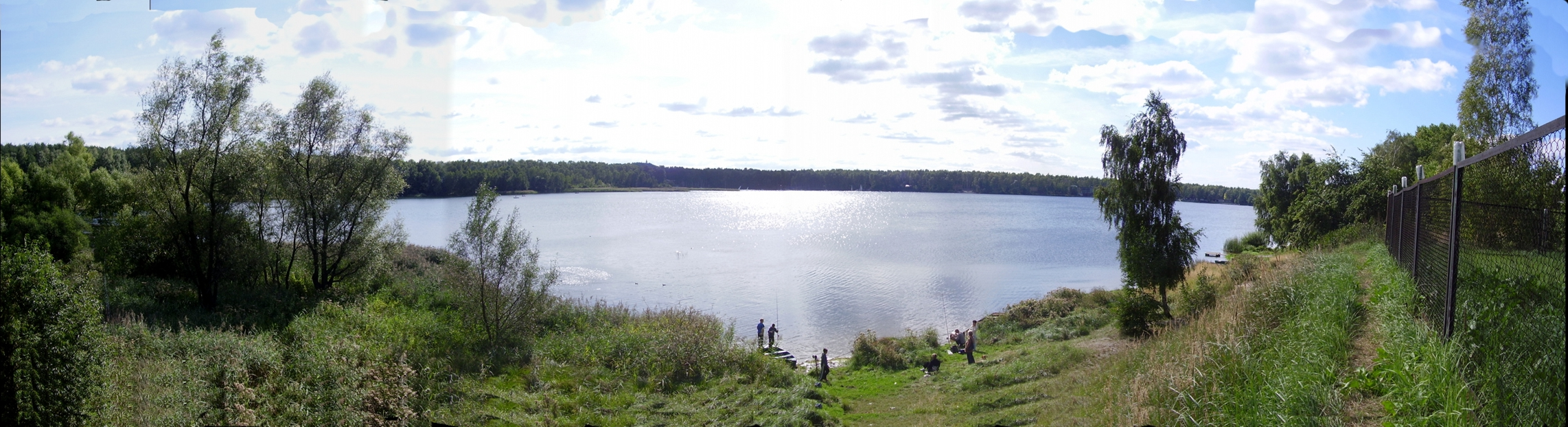
The Pogoria I water reservoir

Pogoria is the name of four artificial lakes in Dąbrowa Górnicza, Silesian Voivodeship, Poland. The individual lakes are referred to as Pogoria I, Pogoria II, Pogoria III, and Pogoria IV. The lake Pogoria IV is also (officially) named Reservoir Kuźnica Warężyńska. The surface areas of the lakes are 0.75, 0.25, 2.05, and 5.60 km^{2}, respectively. The lakes, particularly Pogoria I, are locally well known for their recreational utilization. Parts of Pogoria have a status of the "nature and landscape complex" within the legal framework of the protected areas of Poland.

The name Pogoria is eponymous for Pogoria (ship) and Pogoria (train).

== Origin ==
The lakes are water-filled basins from historical sand quarries. The sand was mostly used as the backfill material in the region coal mines. The oldest lake dates to 1940s. The water originates from the river Czarna Przemsza.
