= Pogoria (train) =

Pogoria was a Polish fast train, which crossed the country from south to northeast, on the route Racibórz – Ełk – Racibórz. It began service in 1980, and across the years, its route changed several times. Among others, it went on the routes Bielsko-Biała – Ełk – Bielsko-Biała, and Racibórz – Suwałki – Racibórz. In 2004, Pogoria was merged with Wigry, which went from Gliwice to Suwałki.

In the year 2002, Pogoria's route was as follows:

- Racibórz – Rybnik – Mikołów – Orzesze – Katowice – Sosnowiec – Dąbrowa Górnicza – Zawiercie – Częstochowa – Warsaw – Olsztyn – Giżycko – Ełk, and the train was seasonal, running only in the summer, and on major holidays.
