= Strzemieszyce Wielkie =

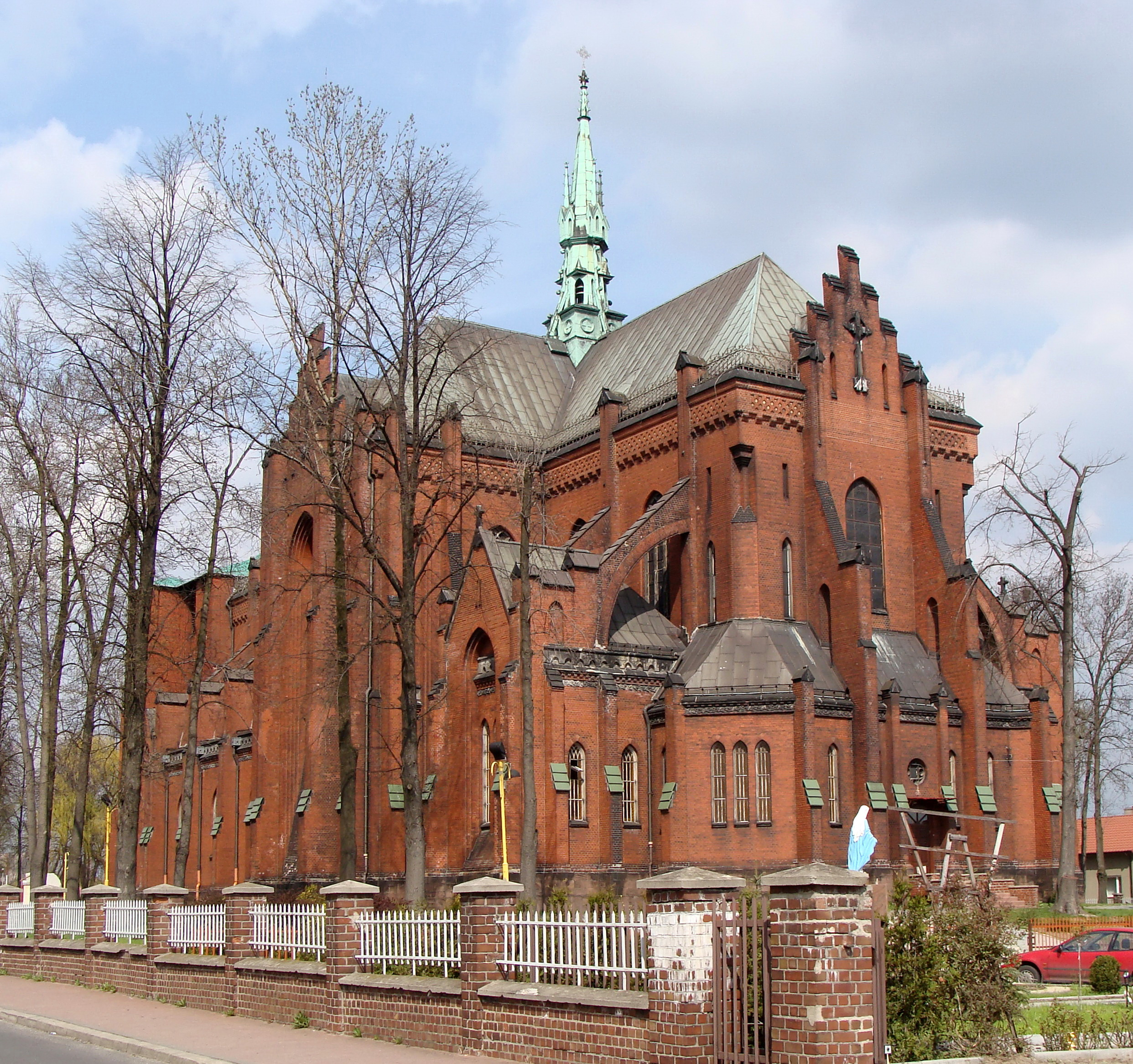
- Strzemieszyce Wielkie, the Sacred Heart Sanctuary

- Coat of arms

- Location within Poland
- Coordinates: 50°18′44″N 19°16′46″E
- Country: Poland
- Voivodeship: Silesian
- City-county Dąbrowa Górnicza: Dąbrowa Górnicza
- Established: 11th century
- Town rights: 1954–1975

Area
  - City: 18.49 km^{2} (7.14 sq mi)

Population
  - Metro: 3,029,000 Katowice urban area
- Time zone: UTC+1 (CET)
  - Summer (DST): UTC+2 (CEST)
- Postal code: 41–300
- Area code: +48 32
- Car plates: SD

Strzemieszyce Wielkie (Hebrew: סצ'אמישיצה ויאלקה ) – a district (dzielnica) of Dąbrowa Górnicza (since 1975) in the Silesian Voivodeship, Poland. Located between the districts Reden and Strzemieszyce Małe, on the national road 94 between Katowice and Olkusz.

== History ==
Traces of ancient human settlement date back to the Lusatian culture period (ca. 700 BC). Excavations carried out in 1996 testify to the existence of a medieval settlement in the 11th century. The first written record of the village name (in Latin Strmyeschycze major) comes from the early 14th century. The village belonged to the bishops of Kraków and was administered as part of the Sławków estates until 1790, when these became nationalized. After the Third Partition of Poland Strzemieszyce Wielkie found itself in the Prussian province of New Silesia. The first elementary school was established in 1806. Between 1807 and 1813 it found itself in the Duchy of Warsaw, and between 1815 and 1914 under Russian rule in Congress Poland.

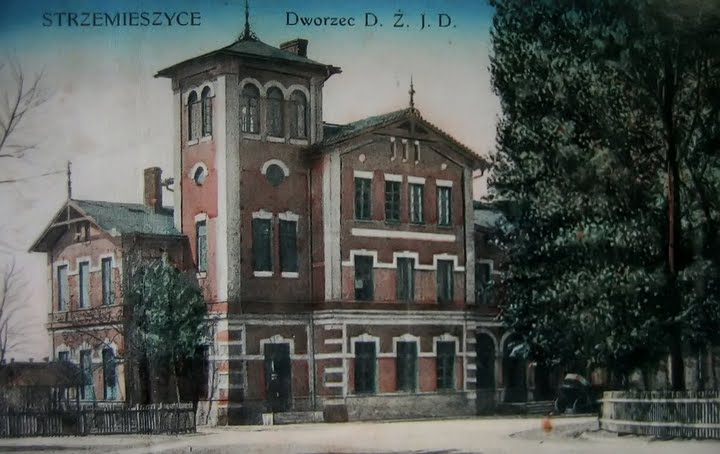
The Ivangorod (Dęblin) railway station in Strzemieszyce Wielkie (1917)

In 1848 a railway station of the Warsaw–Vienna Railway was opened, followed in 1885 by a station of the Ivangorod Railway, connecting Dęblin (Russ.: Ivangorod) and Dąbrowa. The intersection of these two important railways gave rise to industrial development of the settlement. Between the 1870s and the 1930s numerous, albeit small, coal mines (e.g. "Jakub", "Jakub II", "Lilit", "Siurpryz", "Proreden") operated here.

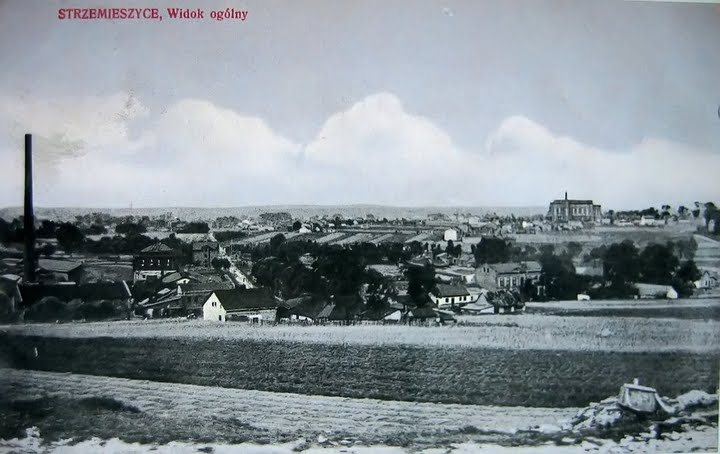
View of Strzemieszyce Wielkie at the beginning of the 20th century

In 1883 a ceresine plant ("Strem") and in 1899 a superphosphate plant were established. The bishop of Kielce Augustyn Łosiński (1867–1937) founded a Roman Catholic parish in Strzemieszyce Wielkie in February 1911. From 1914 to 1918 the settlement came under Austrian occupation. Jews started to settle in Strzemieszyce Wielkie in the second half of the 19th century. In 1885 out of 2962 inhabitants 125 were Jews (4,2%). The Jewish population grew to ca. 20% in the inter-war period.

At the beginning of World War II The Germans occupied Strzemieszyce in September 1939 and immediately began to plunder Jewish homes and businesses and to demand free labor from them. At that time, about 2000 Jews lived in the town. Sometime in 1942, they were forced into a ghetto. In June 1942, 400 were sent to Auschwitz, where most were murdered. In March, 1943, the Germans rounded up the remaining Jews in the ghetto and murdered several dozen. Nearly all the rest were sent to Auschwitz. Only about 70 of the town's Jewish population survived the war. During World War II Strzemieszyce Wielkie (under the German name Groß Strzemieszyce) was the seat of a German Amtsbezirk Strzemieszyce, to which also several other communities (Strzemieszyce Małe, Strzemieszyce Folwark, Kazimierz, Niemce, Porąbka) belonged.

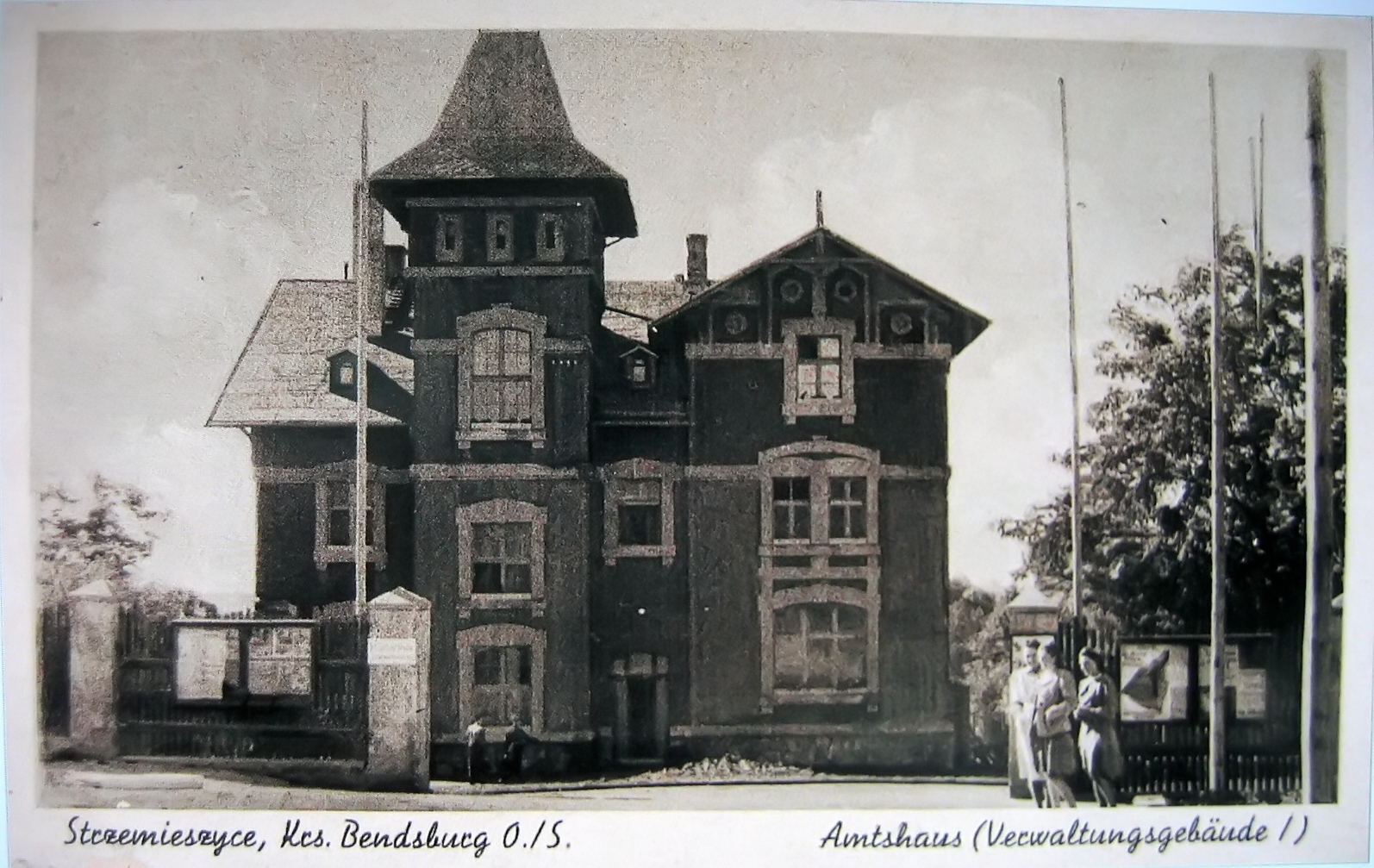
Village hall, around 1942

Town rights from 1954 until 1975, when Strzemieszyce Wielkie became a district of Dąbrowa Górnicza.

== Bibliography ==
1. F. Celiński, A. Czylok, A. Kubajak: Przewodnik przyrodniczy po Dąbrowie Górniczej, Krzeszowice 1996.
2. Feliks Kiryk (Ed.): Dzieje Sławkowa, Kraków 2001, ISBN 83-87345-47-4.
3. Jan Kmiotek, Jan Przemsza-Zieliński: Echo dawnych Strzemieszyc, Dąbrowa Górnicza 1998, ISBN 83-909050-2-7.
4. Jan Kmiotek, Dariusz Kmiotek, Arkadiusz Rybak (Eds.): Echo dawnych Strzemieszyc, cz. IV, Dąbrowa Górnicza 2001, ISBN 83-909836-7-2.
5. Arkadiusz Rybak: Z dziejów oświaty na terenie Strzemieszyc Małych 1820 – 2000, Dąbrowa Górnicza 2002, ISBN 83-909836-0-5.
6. Kazimierz Rymut: Nazwy miast Polski, Ossolineum 1987, ISBN 83-04-02436-5.
