= Basin Palace of Culture =

- Pałac Kultury Zagłębia
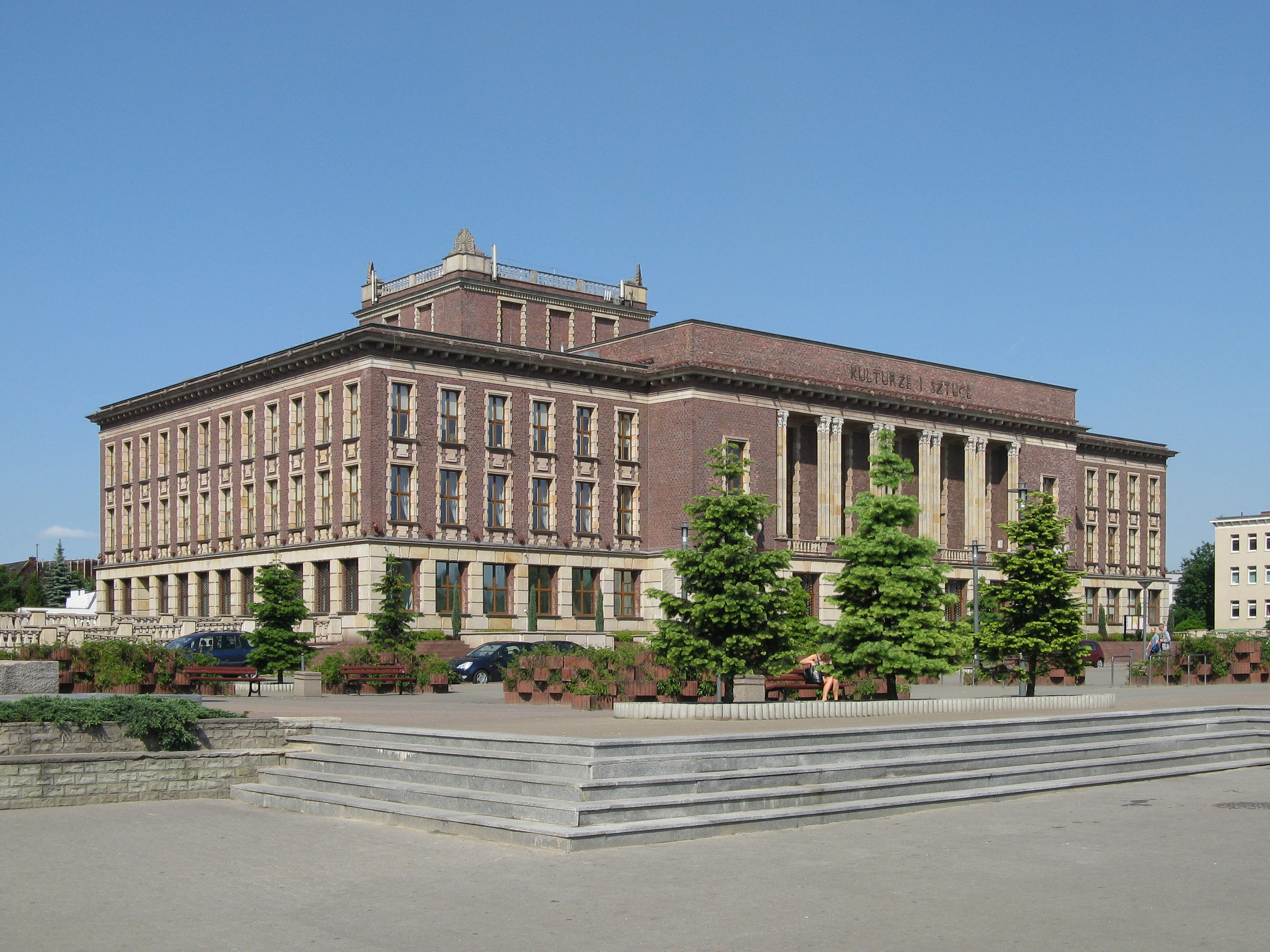
- The building in 2018

General information
- Architectural style: Socialist realism
- Location: Dąbrowa Górnicza, Poland, 1 Wolności Square
- Coordinates: 50.326163°N 19.188416°E
- Construction started: 1951
- Completed: 1958

Technical details
- Floor area: 10,600 m²

Design and construction
- Architect: Zbigniew Rzepecki
- Designations: A/690/2020, August 26, 2020 (Silesian Voivodeship)

Website
- Official website

The Basin Palace of Culture (Polish: Pałac Kultury Zagłębia), formerly known as the Basin House of Culture (Polish: Dom Kultury Zagłębia), and the Dąbrowa Palace of Culture (Polish: Dąbrowski Pałac Kultury), is a public building constructed between 1951 and 1958 according to the design of Zbigniew Rzepecki in Dąbrowa Górnicza, Poland. The building is listed as a heritage site in the register of monuments in the Silesian Voivodeship (registration number A/690/2020).

== History ==
The concept of building the Zagłębie Palace of Culture originated in 1945. It was initiated by Aleksander Zawadzki, then the Silesian-Dąbrowski Voivode and later Deputy Prime Minister. In 1949, the Committee for the Construction of the Cultural Center was established, chaired by Marian Kuzior. The design was created by Polish architect Zbigniew Rzepecki. Construction began in May 1951, led by Zjednoczenie Budownictwa Miejskiego in Sosnowiec. After seven years, the Palace was officially opened on January 11, 1958. The first administrator of the building was the Department of Culture of the Presidium of the Provincial National Council in Katowice.

In 1979, it became the first of its kind in Poland to be entered into the monument register under number A/1240/79. In 2020, it was relisted under number A/690/2020.

Between 2011 and 2014, the building underwent a comprehensive renovation. The facility reopened officially on October 11, 2014.

== Architecture ==
The Zagłębie Palace of Culture, designed by Zbigniew Rzepecki, is a monumental example of Socialist realism. The building features rich ornamentation, marble finishes, spacious halls with massive columns, hand-painted majolica tiles, and grand mirrors.

Located in the city center, the building spans three floors with a red brick and sandstone facade. Its distinctive central tower features decorative attics and a crown-shaped roof. The facility encompasses 38,000 m³ of volume and 10,600 m² of usable space, including 1,900 m² for majestic halls.

The main theater hall has 588 seats, a revolving stage with an 11-meter diameter, and advanced lighting and sound systems. Additional facilities include:

- Theater Cellar (90 seats)
- Two Conference Rooms (100 and 50 seats)
- Banquet Hall connected to a catering area (150 seats)
- Chamber Hall with a grand piano (100 seats)
- Cinema Hall (88 seats)

== Cultural Activities ==
The Zagłębie Palace of Culture has been a hub for cultural events, including concerts, theatrical performances, exhibitions, and workshops. It organizes several annual events, such as the International Michał Spisak Music Competition and the "Seven Deadly Sins" art and poetry contest. The facility also hosts educational programs for children, youth, and seniors.
