= Dąbrowa Górnicza =

- City county
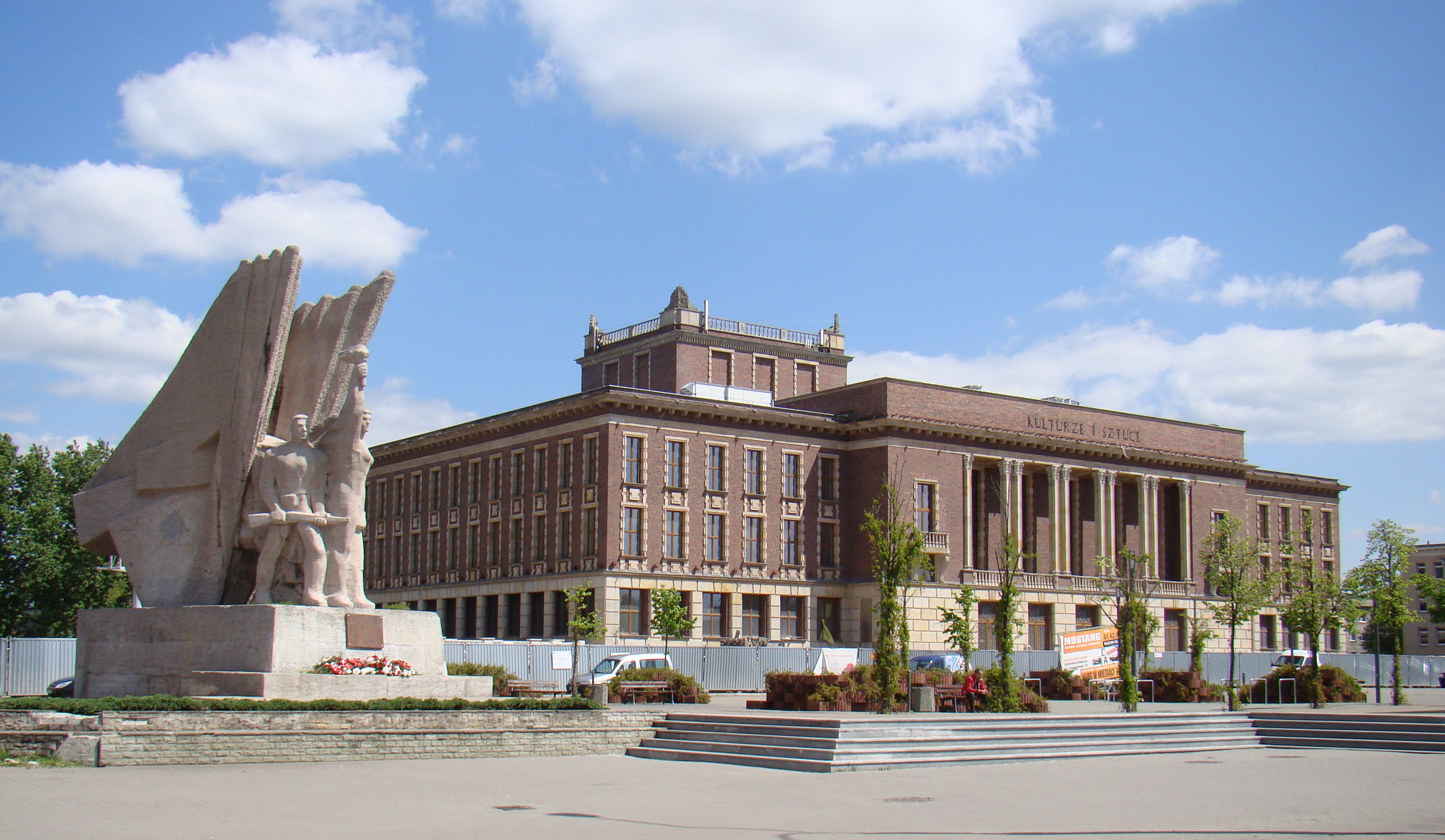
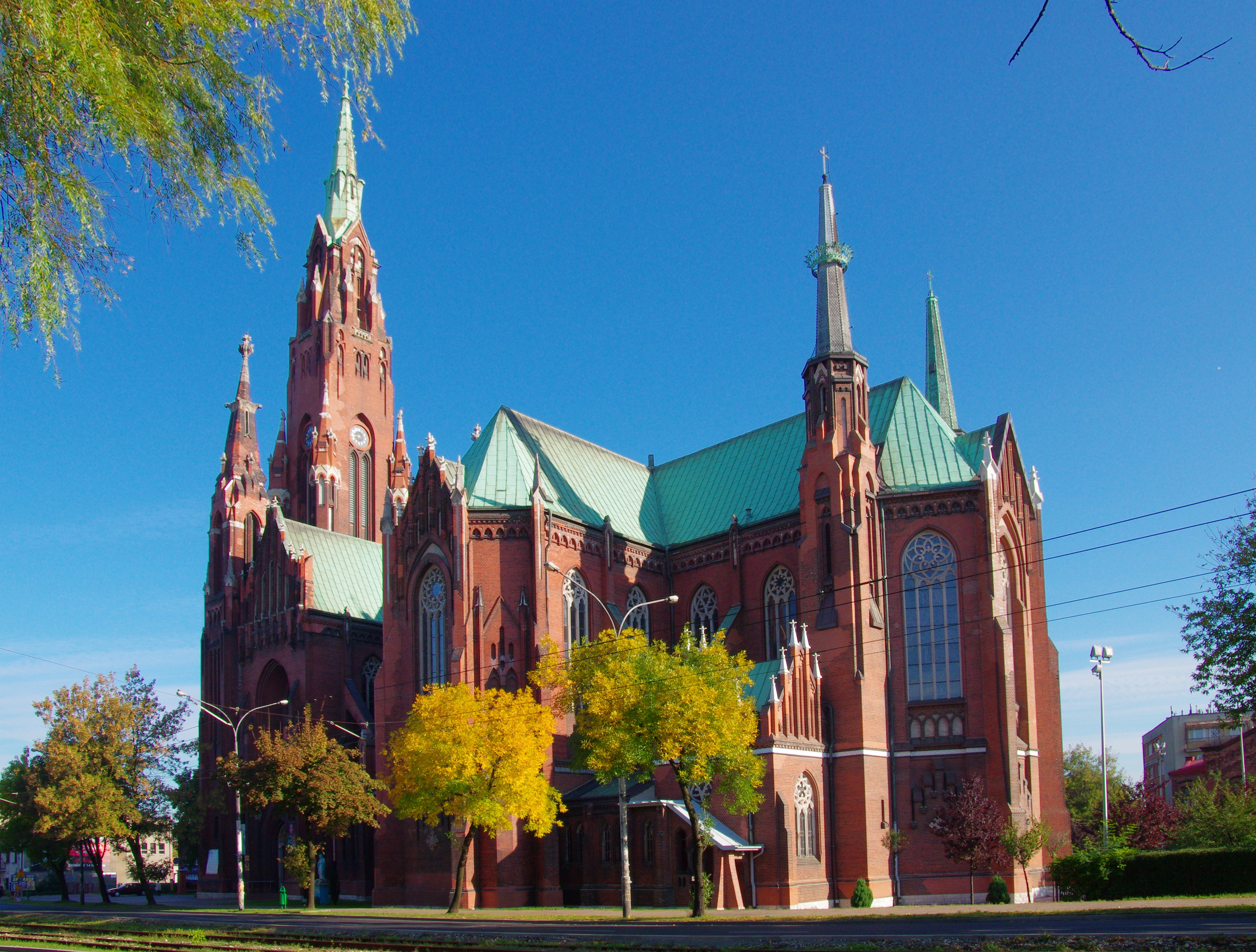
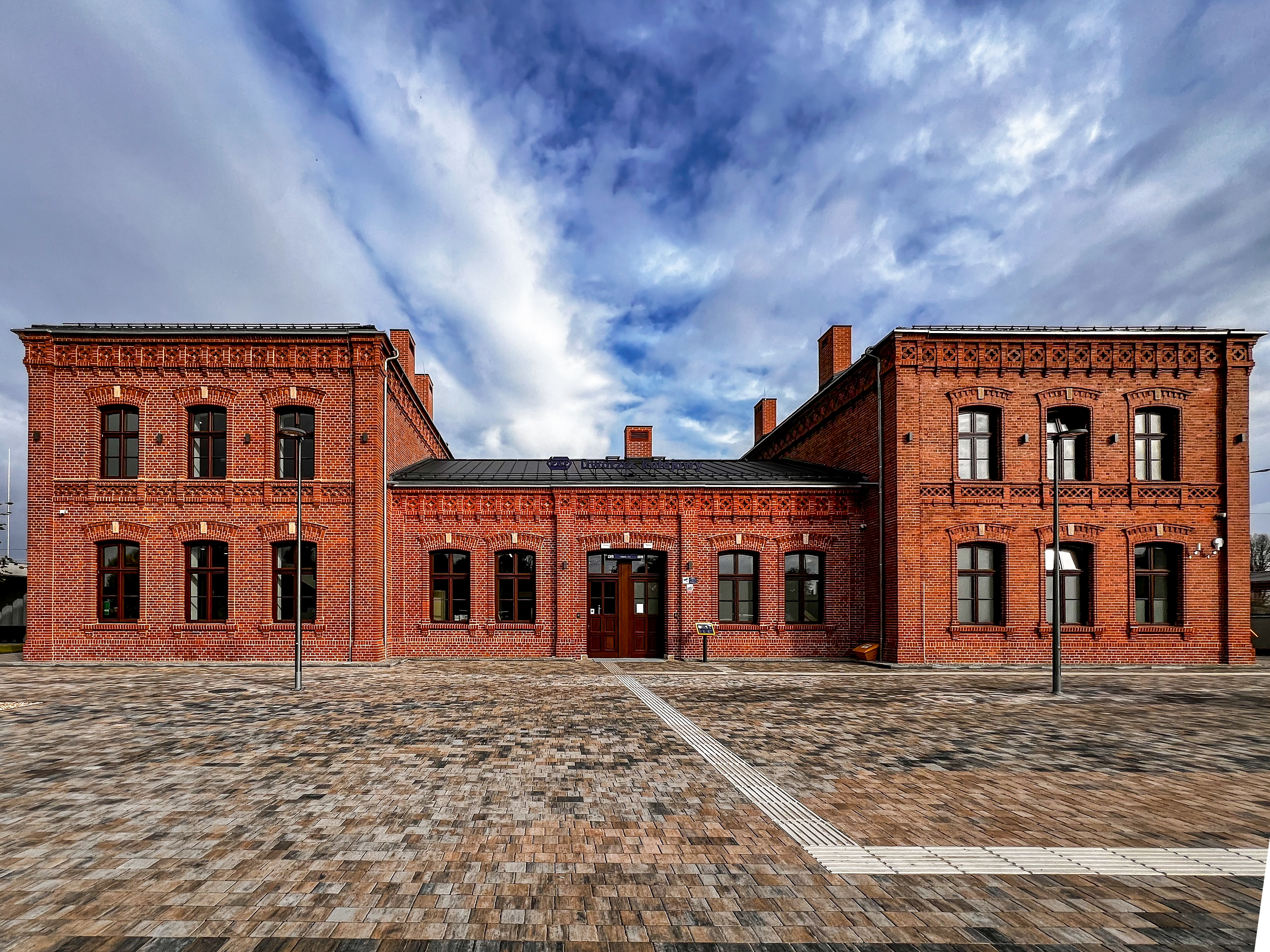
- Basin Palace of Culture Basilica of Saint Mary of the Angels Main railway station

- Flag Coat of arms
- Interactive map of Dąbrowa Górnicza
- Location within Poland
- Coordinates: 50°19′17″N 19°11′14″E
- Country: Poland
- Voivodeship: Silesian
- County: city county
- City rights: 1916

Government
  - City mayor: Marcin Bazylak (L)

Area
  - City county: 188 km^{2} (73 sq mi)

Population (31 December 2021)
  - City county: 116,971 ▼ (31st)
  - Density: 622.2/km^{2} (1,611/sq mi)
  - Urban: 2,746,000
  - Metro: 4,620,624
- Time zone: UTC+1 (CET)
  - Summer (DST): UTC+2 (CEST)
- Postal code: 41–300 to 42–530
- Area code: +48 32
- Car plates: SD
- Primary airport: Katowice Airport
- Website: https://www.dabrowa-gornicza.pl/

Dąbrowa Górnicza (Polish pronunciation: [dɔmˈbrɔva ɡurˈɲit͡ʂa]) is a city in southern Poland, in the eastern part of the Katowice urban area, in the Silesian Voivodeship. It is located on the Czarna Przemsza and Biała Przemsza rivers (tributaries of the Vistula, see Przemsza).

The city gives its name to the Dąbrowa Basin, an industrial and historical subregion of the wider historic region of Lesser Poland, and is its second largest city (after neighbouring Sosnowiec). Dąbrowa Górnicza is one of the cities of the Katowice urban area (2.7 million people), and within the greater Katowice-Ostrava metropolitan area (5.2 million people). The population of the city itself as of December 2021 is 116,971.

== Nature ==
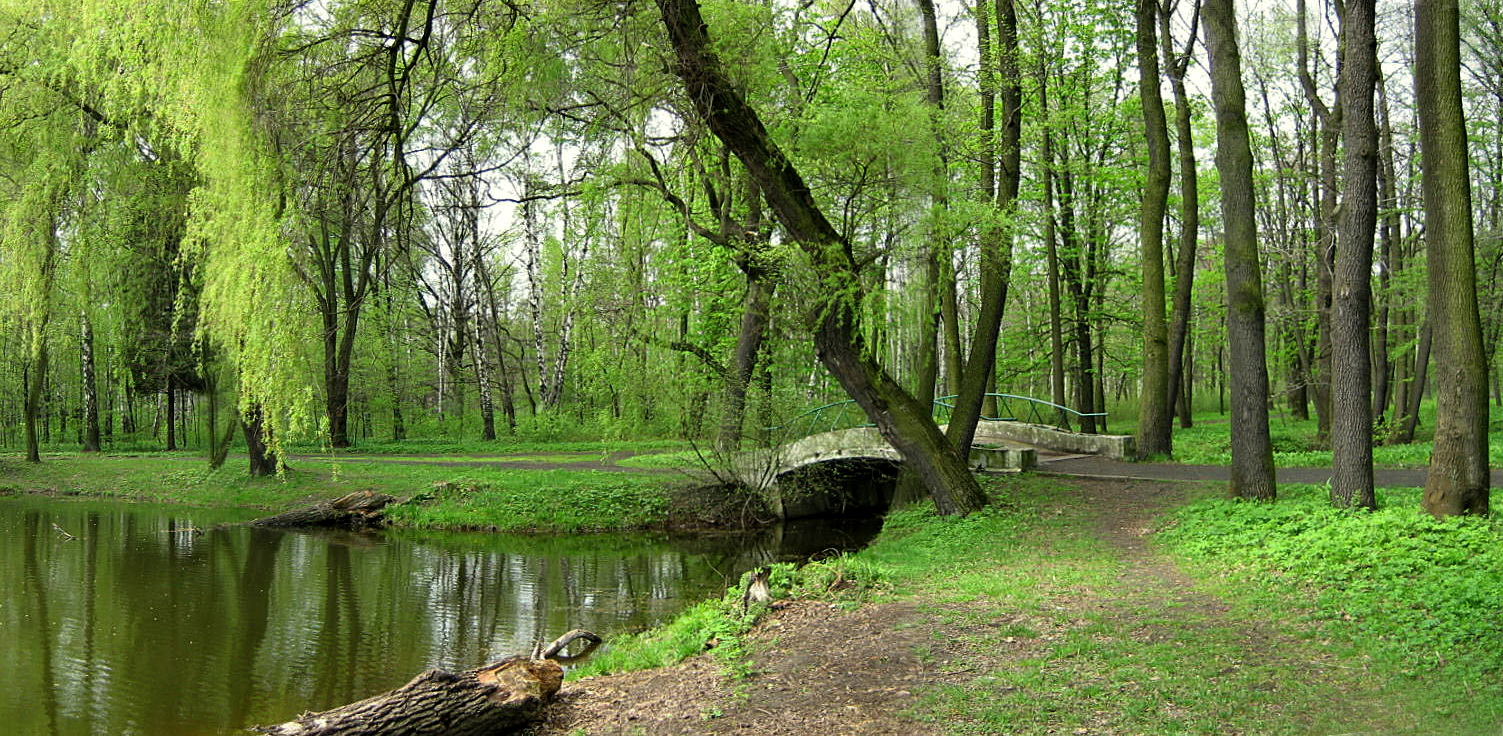
Zielona Park

In Dąbrowa there are many green areas. Total area of local lakes is over 800 hectares, there are 180 hectares of parks (0.96%) and 4100 hectares of forests (21.7%). Particularly noteworthy is the complex of Pogoria (lakes). Furthermore, part of the Eagles' Nests Landscape Park reaches the outskirts of the city.

The largest desert in Poland and in all of Central Europe, the Błędów Desert, lies within the city limits.

== Locality and districts ==
Dąbrowa Górnicza is the largest city of the province and the 11th largest in Poland in terms of territory, with total area of 188,7 square kilometers. The city lies among the hills, at 258 to 390 meters above sea level. Dąbrowa Górnicza borders Będzin County, Zawiercie County, Olkusz County and the city of Sosnowiec. At the same time it borders the cities and towns of Sosnowiec, Będzin, Siewierz and Sławków.

=== Districts ===
The city is divided into several districts: Antoniów, Błędów, Bugaj, Centrum, Dziewiąty, Gołonóg, Korzeniec, Kuźniczka Nowa, Łazy Błędowskie, Łęka, Łęknice, Łosień, Marianki, Mydlice, Okradzionów, Piekło, Ratanice, Reden, Sikorka, Strzemieszyce Małe, Strzemieszyce Wielkie, Trzebiesławice, Trzydziesty, Tucznawa, Ujejsce, Ząbkowice. From 1977 to 1984, the town of Sławków was a district of Dąbrowa Górnicza.

== Etymology ==
The place name Dąbrowa, is derived from the Polish word dąb (oak), and denotes an oak grove, as the territory of the original village is believed to have been covered by oak forests during the early days of its existence. From the 19th century, the settlement grew to be an important coal-mining center, and its name was supplemented by the adjective Górnicza (which refers to mining) in 1919, to distinguish it from such towns, as Dąbrowa Tarnowska and Dąbrowa Białostocka.

== History ==
=== Early history ===
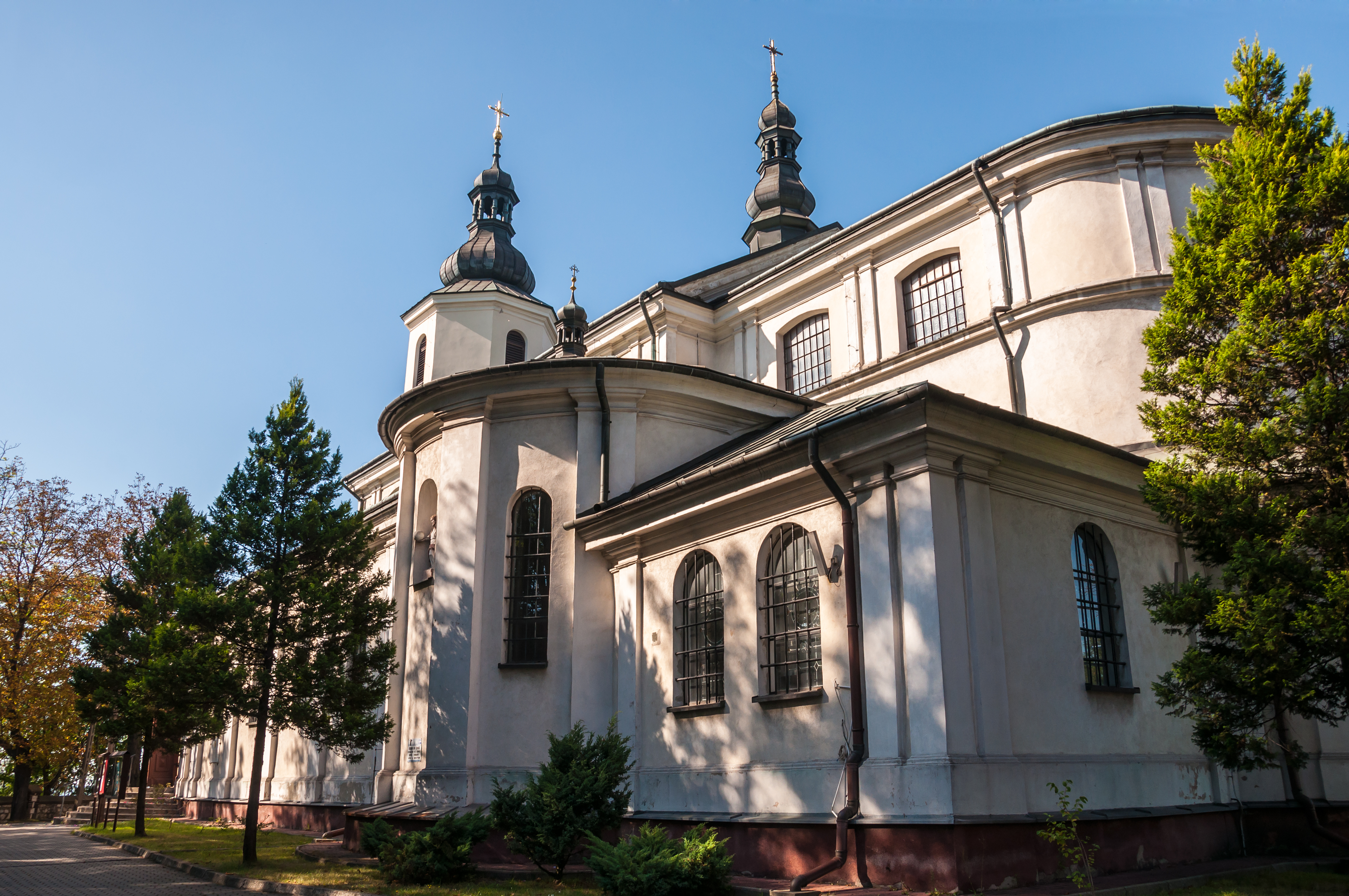
Baroque Saint Anthony church

In the first half of the 18th century, Dąbrowa was a small agricultural settlement belonging to the Będzin parish of the Kraków Voivodeship in the Lesser Poland Province in the Kingdom of Poland. It was first mentioned on 25 July 1726, when the parish priest of Holy Trinity Church at Będzin noted a woman named Anna Lisowa from Dąbrowa. At the 1787 census of the Archdiocese of Kraków, the settlement numbered 184 inhabitants.

The districts of Dąbrowa, which for centuries had comprised separate villages, are much older. Trzebieszowice was first mentioned in the 12th century; Błędów was mentioned by Bishop of Kraków Iwo Odrowąż in the year 1220; Strzemieszyce and Ujejsce were mentioned in the 14th century; Gołonóg in the 15th century; and Ząbkowice was described by Polish historian Jan Długosz in the 15th century.

=== Industrial growth ===
After the Third Partition of Poland (1795), Dąbrowa was annexed by Prussia and incorporated into its newly formed province of New Silesia. The Prussians discovered rich deposits of coal here and the first coal mine was established by Friedrich Wilhelm von Reden in 1796. In 1799, first detailed map of this area was created, on which a settlement called Stara Dąbrowa is presented. It was located along a road from Kraków to Upper Silesia. The coal mine established by von Reden attracted workers, and a settlement was soon established around it.

In 1807, Dąbrowa was regained by Poles and included within the short-lived Polish Duchy of Warsaw. After the duchy's dissolution in 1815, it became part of Russian-controlled Congress Poland. In 1846, the Cieszkowski Coal Mine was opened, named after Józef Cieszkowski. The Zinc Plant Konstanty operated as early as 1823, and the Huta Bankowa steel works, which is still in operation, was built in Dąbrowa Górnicza in 1834. Other factories were also established, including brickworks, a kitchenware foundry, a wire, nails and chains factory, and a steel and rail factory that supplied railroad tracks for the Warsaw–Vienna railway and Russian railways. The local cultural center was the Resursa, visited by writers Eliza Orzeszkowa, Maria Konopnicka, Stanisław Przybyszewski, and actress Helena Modrzejewska.

During the January Uprising, in February 1863, Dąbrowa was captured by Polish insurgents after their victory in the Battle of Sosnowiec nearby.

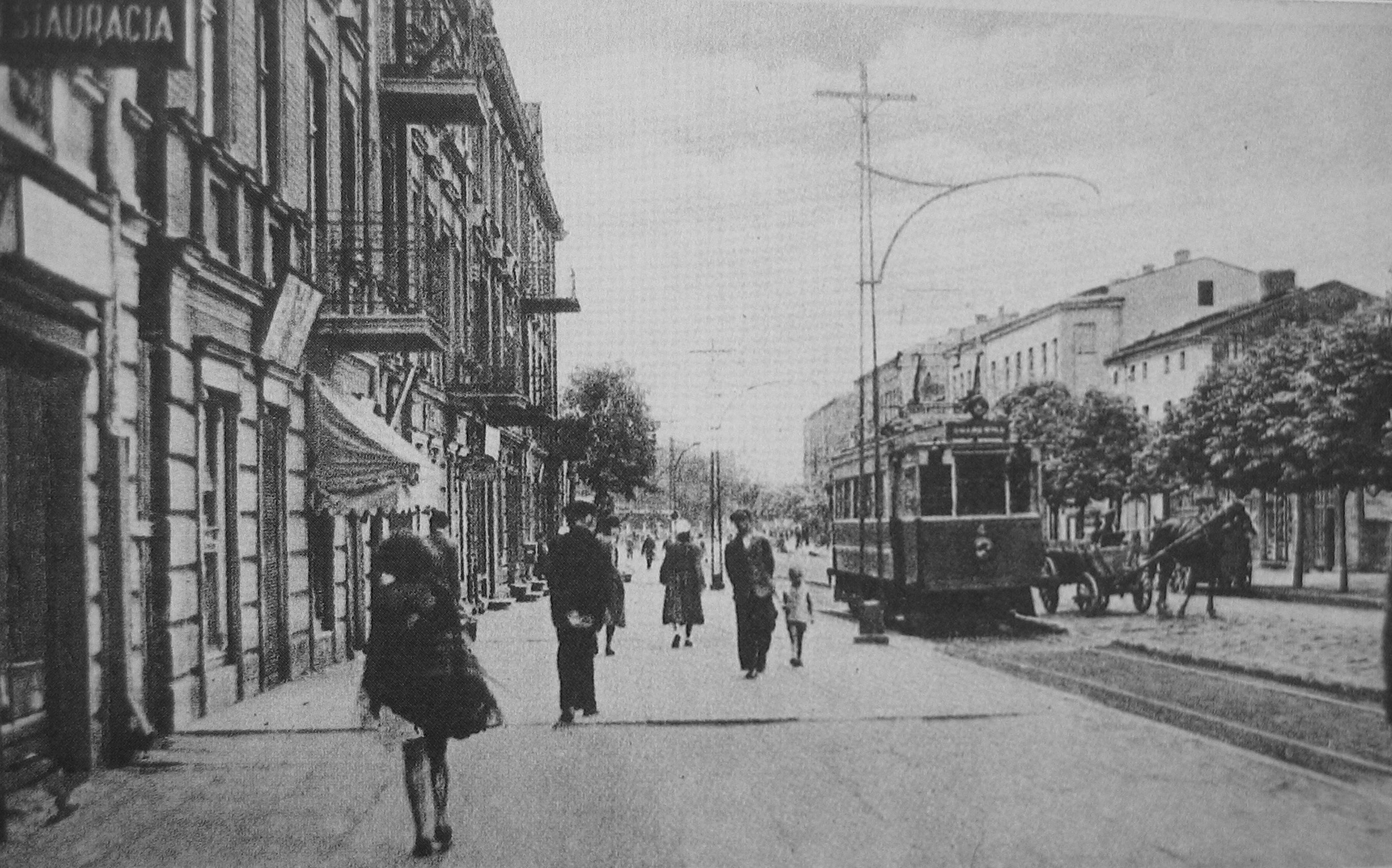
Sobieski Street 1928

In 1909, the gmina of Dąbrowa Górnicza was established by Tsarist authorities. Even though its population reached 30,000, the Russians were reluctant to grant Dąbrowa town charter, so it remained a village until 18 August 1916, when Austrian authorities, which during World War I occupied southern part of Congress Poland, agreed to establish the town. After the war, in 1918, Poland regained independence and control of the city. 15 local Polish boy scouts were killed in fights for Polish independence in 1914–1920. In the Second Polish Republic, Dąbrowa belonged to Kielce Voivodeship. According to the 1921 census, the town's population was 89.7% Polish, 9.8% Jewish and 0.2% French.

=== World War II ===
In September 1939, in the beginning of World War II, the city was invaded by Germany, and shortly afterwards the German Einsatzgruppe I operated in the city and committed various crimes against the Polish population. Also in September 1939, Wehrmacht troops carried out a massacre of 14 Polish boy scouts from nearby villages in the present-day district of Tucznawa. Poles from Dąbrowa Górnicza were among the victims of massacres committed by the Germans in other places, including Sosnowiec on September 4, 1939, and Celiny on June 4, 1940. Under German occupation the city was annexed directly to Germany, and included within the Upper Silesia Province. At least 14 Polish policemen from Dąbrowa were murdered by the Russians in the large Katyn massacre in April–May 1940. Further executions of Poles were carried out by the Germans during the war. Over 40 local Polish boy and girl scouts were killed by the Germans in various places, including the Auschwitz concentration camp and during the Warsaw Uprising of 1944, and over 60 local miners were also murdered in Auschwitz.

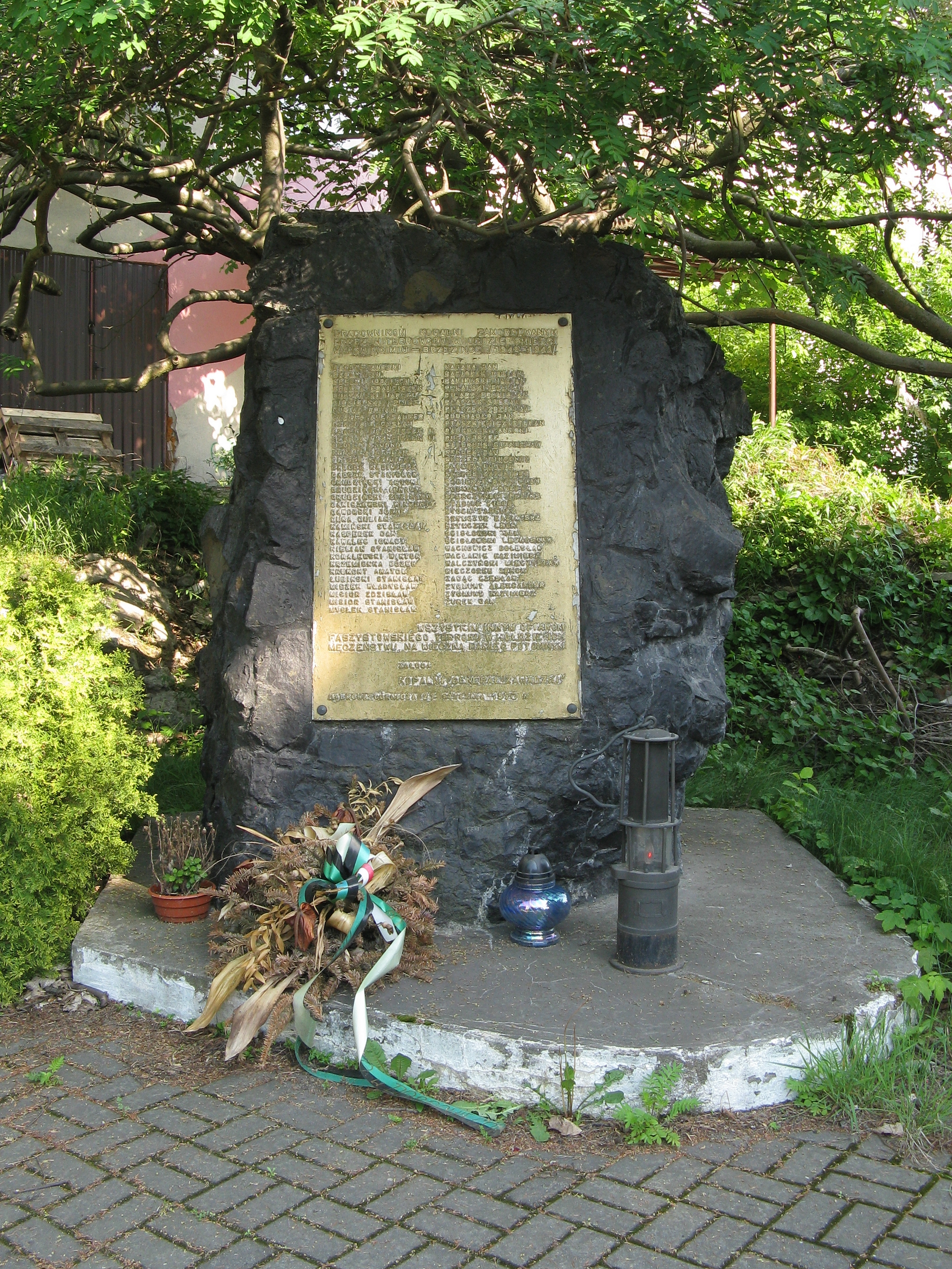
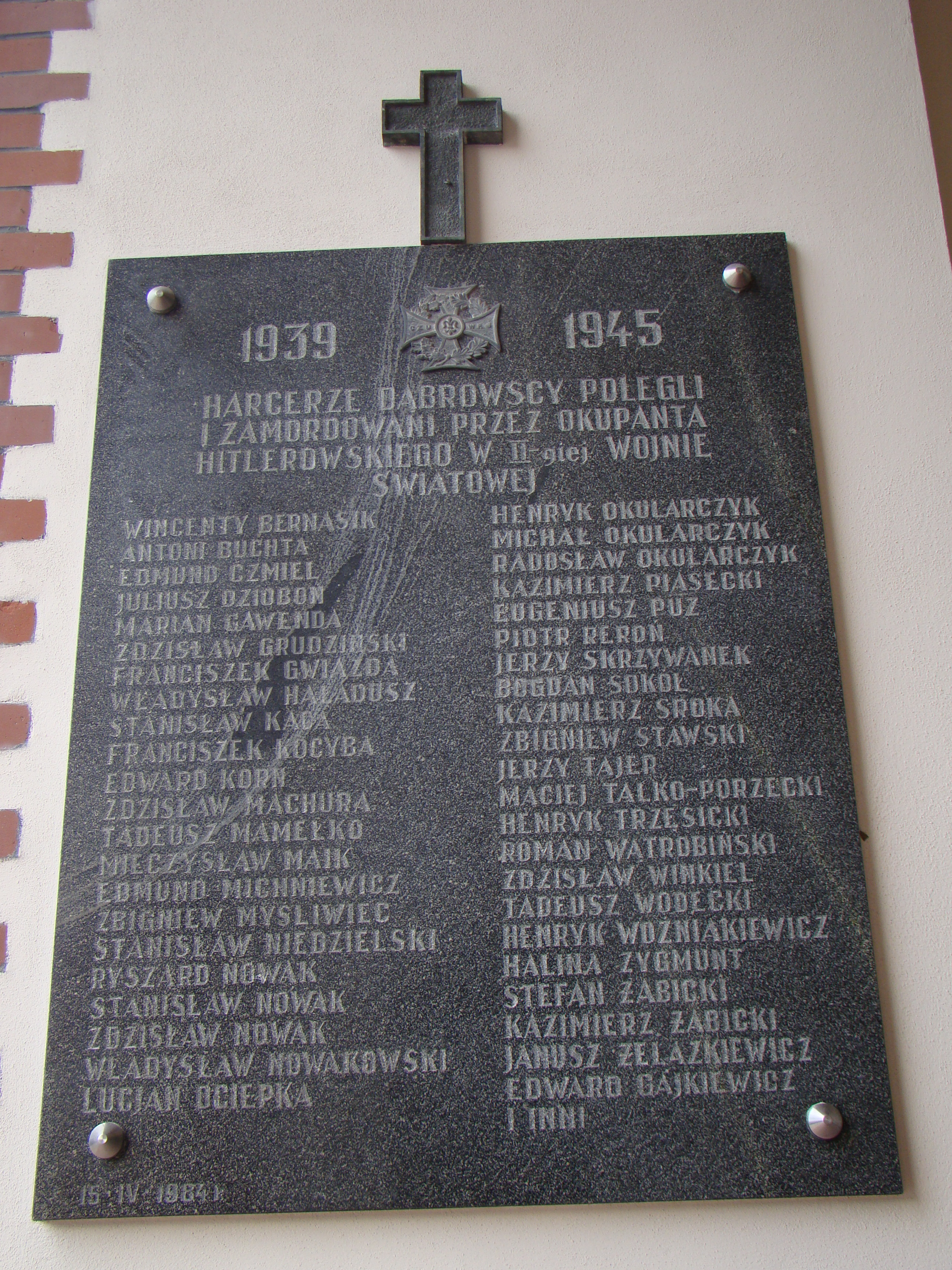
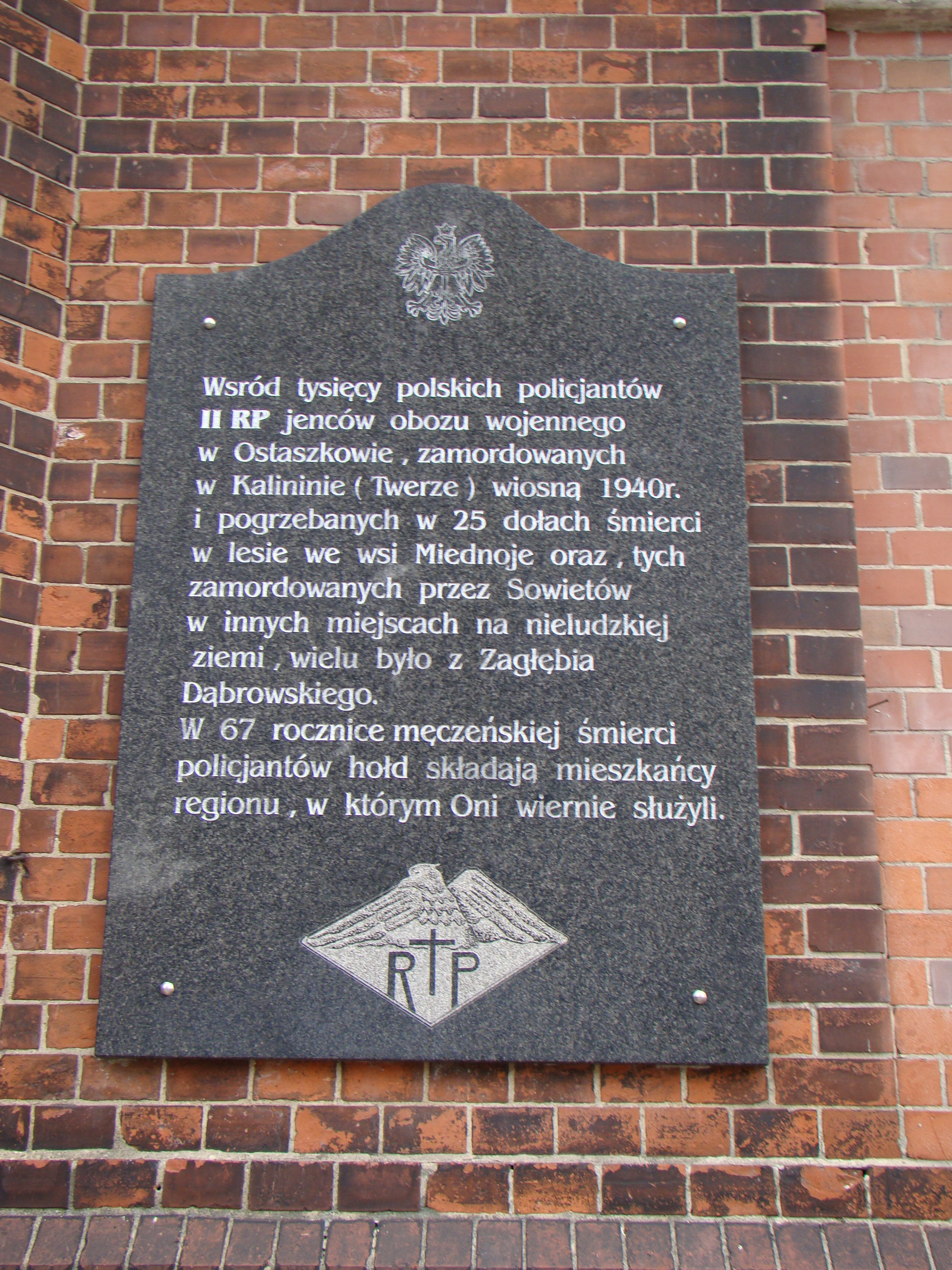
Memorials to local victims of WW2: miners murdered in Auschwitz, boy scouts killed by Germany, and policemen murdered in the Katyn massacre by Russia

In October 1941, the occupiers expelled over 100 Poles, who were then sent to forced labour either to Germany or to various factories in the region, while their houses were handed over to German colonists as part of the Lebensraum policy. The Germans also operated the E513 and E543 forced labour subcamps of the Stalag VIII-B/344 prisoner-of-war camp at the local coal mine. More than 4,000 local Jews were enclosed in a ghetto, and later murdered in death camps.

In 1945, the town was restored to Poland, although with a Soviet-installed communist regime, which stayed in power until the Fall of Communism in the 1980s. In the following years, the Polish anti-communist resistance was active in the city, including the nationwide Freedom and Independence Association and the local Polish Youth Organisation "Crown of Liberation".

=== Recent history ===
Together with the Dąbrowa Basin, the city was transferred to Katowice Voivodeship in 1945. In 1960, the previously separate settlement of Gołonóg was included within the city limits.

In 1968, the local church of Saint Mary of the Angels was visited by the Primate of Poland Stefan Wyszyński and cardinal Karol Wojtyła (future Pope John Paul II).

The 1970s saw the construction of the Katowice Steelworks, which is nowadays the biggest steel producing plant in Poland, after privatization owned by ArcelorMittal. In the 1970s the town expanded territorially and economically. In 1975 and 1977, city limits were greatly expanded by including Strzemieszyce Wielkie, Strzemieszyce Małe, Ząbkowice and other surrounding settlements as new districts. The population of Dąbrowa Górnicza reached its peak in 1982 with 152,373 inhabitants. In 1984, the neighboring settlements of Marianki and Ratanice were included within the city limits of Dąbrowa Górnicza as new districts. From 1975 to 1998, it was administratively located in the Katowice Voivodeship.

In the 1990s, all local coal mines were closed, because of lack of coal. The oldest part of the town Reden still exists. In 1993, the neighboring settlement of Trzebiesławice was also included within the city limits as a new district.

== Demographics ==
Historical population

Year	Pop.	±%
1921	39,860	—
1931	36,987	−7.2%
1939	41,373	+11.9%
1950	32,446	−21.6%
1960	55,720	+71.7%
1970	61,700	+10.7%

Year	Pop.	±%
1980	141,431	+129.2%
1990	136,862	−3.2%
2000	132,858	−2.9%
2010	127,431	−4.1%
2020	118,285	−7.2%

== Education ==
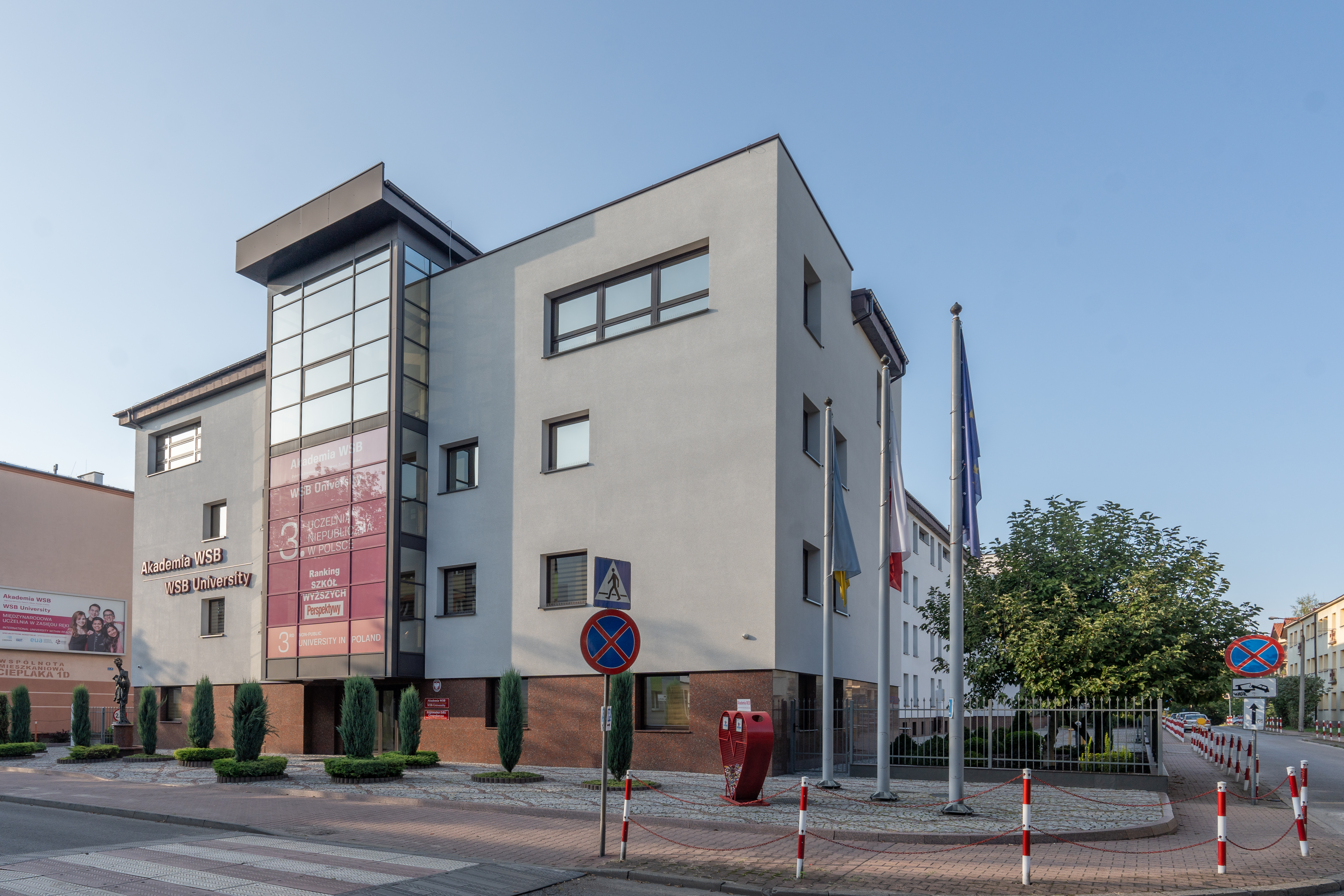
WSB University

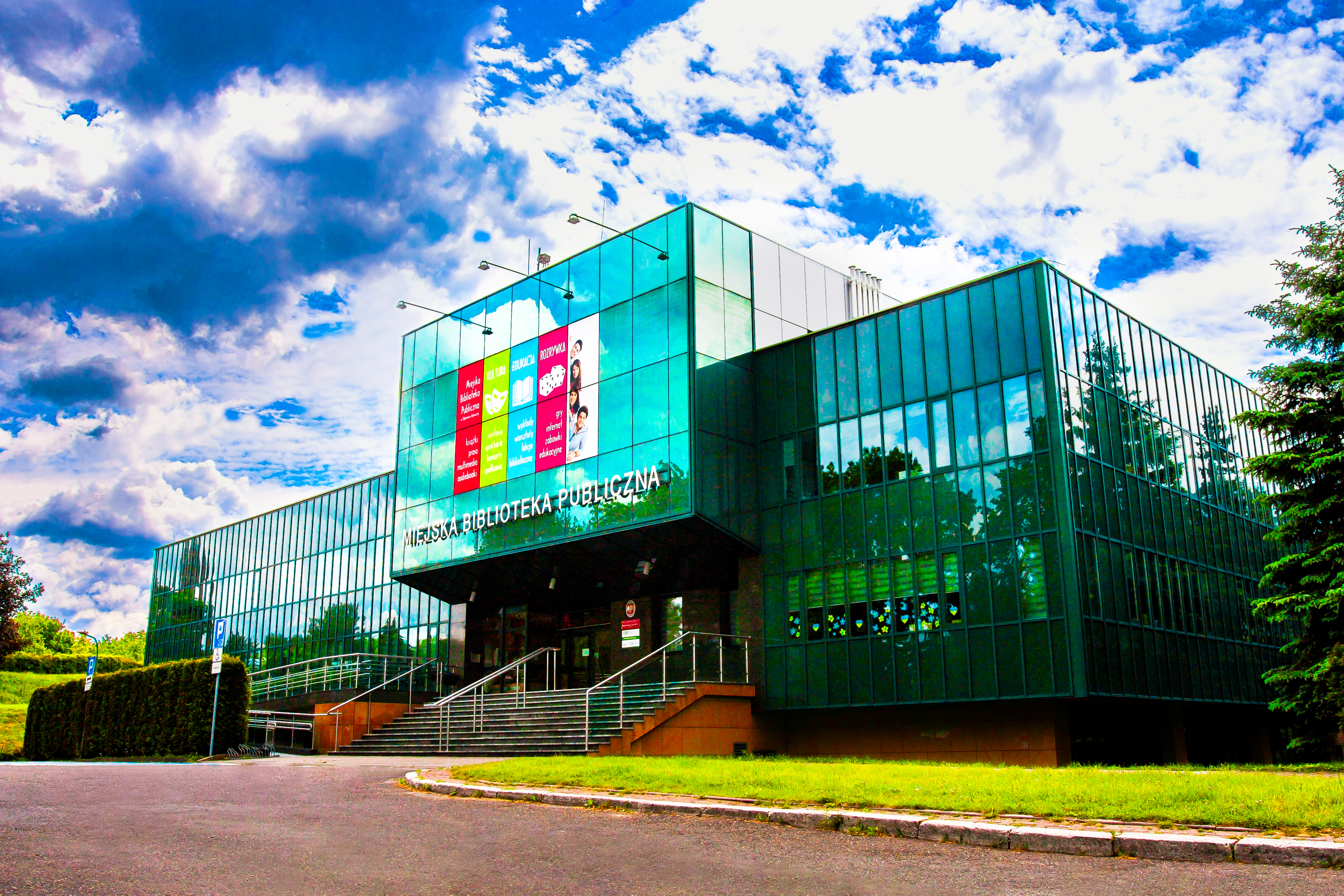
Municipal Public Library

- Silesian Technical University, Faculty of Chemistry, Industrial and Environmental Chemistry course
- WSB University
- Wyższa Szkoła Planowania Strategicznego

== Transport ==
=== Road transport ===
The road network of Dąbrowa Górnicza comprises 396.2 km of public roads, with municipal roads accounting for approximately 67% (267 km) of the total. Additionally, there are 89.7 km of county roads, 23.8 km of voivodeship roads, and 15.7 km of national roads. The primary administrator of these roads is the Mayor of Dąbrowa Górnicza, while the General Directorate for National Roads and Motorways (GDDKiA) manages an over 8 km section of the S1 expressway.

Major roads passing through the city include:

- Expressway S1, part of the European route E75
- National road 86
- National road 94
- Voivodeship road 790
- Voivodeship road 796
- Voivodeship road 910

=== Rail transport ===
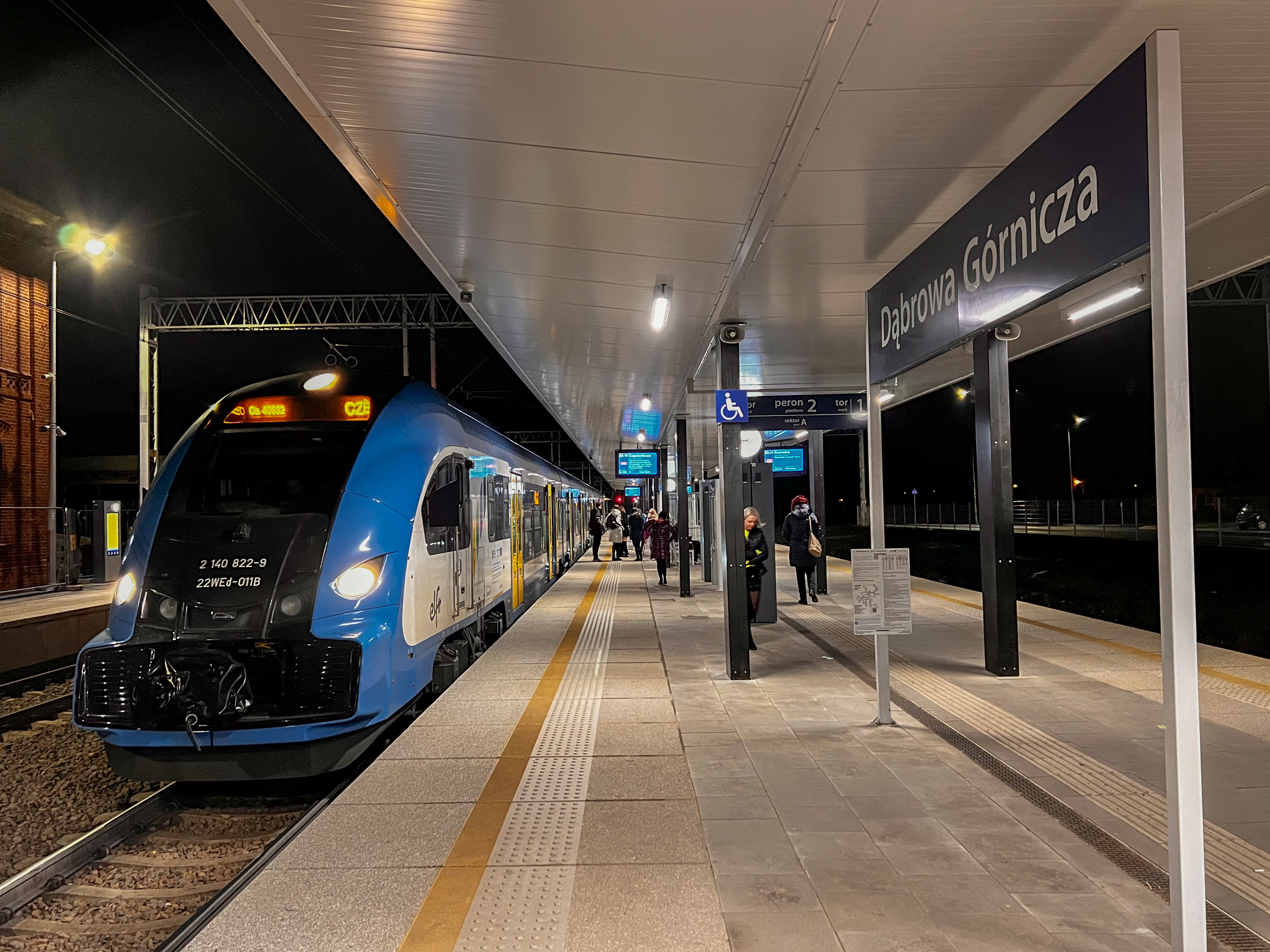
Dąbrowa Górnicza railway station after renovation in 2023

Dąbrowa Górnicza boasts a well-developed rail network with one of the highest densities in Poland. The city is situated on the historical Warsaw–Vienna railway, enhancing its connectivity.

There are eight railway stations within the city limits:

- Line 1 (Warsaw – Częstochowa – Katowice): Dąbrowa Górnicza, Dąbrowa Górnicza Pogoria, Dąbrowa Górnicza Gołonóg, Dąbrowa Górnicza Ząbkowice, Dąbrowa Górnicza Sikorka
- Line 62 (Katowice – Kielce): Dąbrowa Górnicza Strzemieszyce, Dąbrowa Górnicza Wschodnia

Express and fast trains stop at Dąbrowa Górnicza and Dąbrowa Górnicza Ząbkowice stations, while the other stations serve local connections. Since December 2016, international trains have connected Dąbrowa Górnicza to Prague, Vienna, Bratislava, and Budapest.

Historically, a passenger railway line connected Dąbrowa Górnicza Ząbkowice with Piekary Śląskie and extended to Tarnowskie Góry, passing through areas such as Będzin Łagisza, Psary Gródków, Będzin Grodziec, and Wojkowice. This line operated passenger services until 1982 and was dismantled in 1993.

Near the former Huta Katowice, there is a freight transshipment terminal of the Broad Gauge Metallurgy Line, which connects Poland with Ukraine and Russia without the need for cargo reloading at the border.

=== Public transport ===
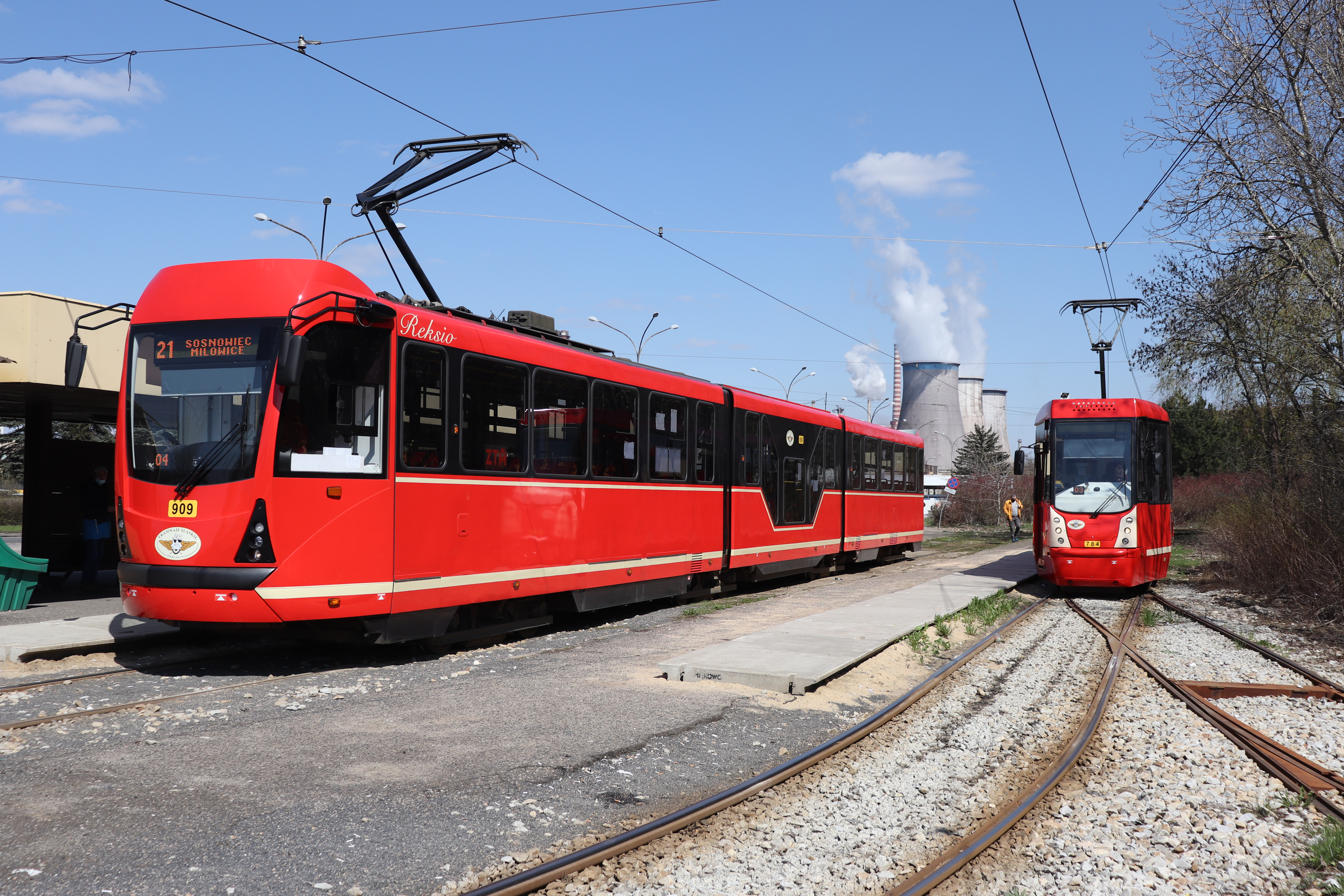
Düwag PTm and Konstal 105Na trams in Dąbrowa Górnicza

Dąbrowa Górnicza is integrated into the Metropolis GZM public transportation system, managed by the Zarząd Transportu Metropolitalnego (ZTM), which oversees both bus and tram networks.

The city is part of the Silesian Interurbans tram network, one of the largest and oldest in Europe, operational since 1894 and encompassing over 200 km of tracks.

Additionally, Dąbrowa Górnicza participates in the Metrorower metropolitan bicycle system, operated by Nextbike. The system features numerous stations across Dąbrowa Górnicza and surrounding cities.

=== Air transport ===
Approximately 11 km from the city's border and 18 km from its center lies the Katowice International Airport, accessible via the S1 expressway.

== Culture ==
Among cultural institutions there are the Palace of Zagłębie Culture, City Museum Sztygarka, Ząbkowice House of Culture, Zagłębie Music Scene, Chamber Orchestra of Zagłębie, Film Center Helios, and various music and arts schools.

== Sports ==
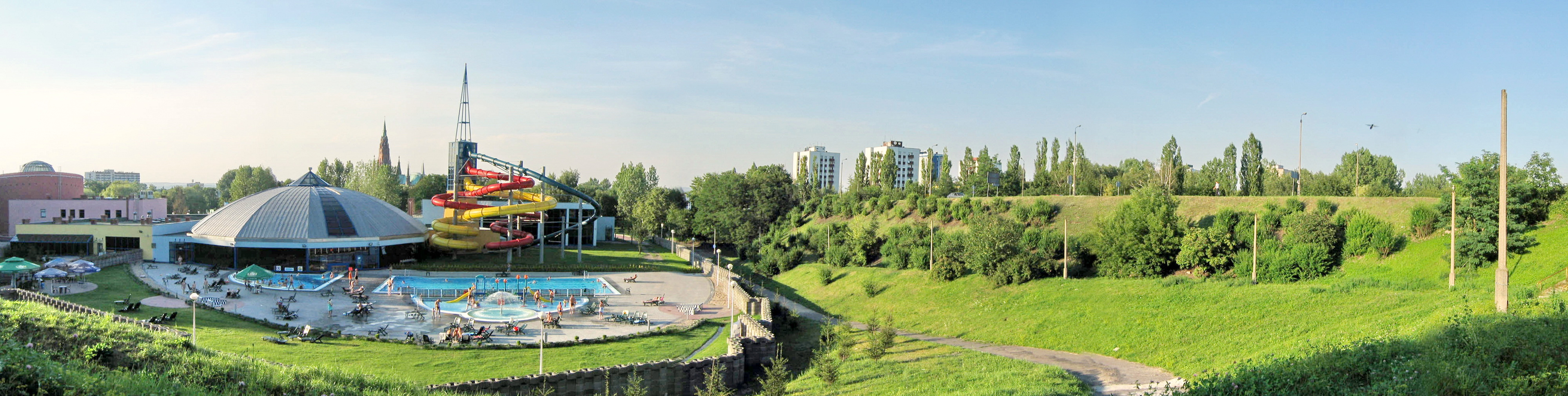
"Nemo" Waterpark

The city's most notable sports club is basketball team MKS Dąbrowa Górnicza, which competes in the Polish Basketball League, the country's top division. The local football clubs include Zagłębie Dąbrowa Górnicza and Unia Ząbkowice, which both compete in the lower leagues.

== Notable people ==
- Karol Adamiecki (1866–1933), economist, engineer
- Aleksander Zawadzki (1899–1964), head of state of Poland in 1952–1964
- Jerzy Pławczyk (1911–1989), athlete, competed at 1932 and 1936 Summer Olympics
- Edward Babiuch (1927–2021), communist political figure
- Zdzisław Marchwicki (1927–1977), serial killer
- Kazimierz Imieliński (1929–2010), physician and father of Polish sexology
- Sobiesław Zasada (born 1930), rally driver, businessman
- Janusz Gajos (born 1939), actor
- Jerzy Janikowski (1952–2006), Olympic fencer
- Dawid Podsiadło (born 1993), singer
- Igor Michaliszyn (born 1996), Mixed martial artist
- Maja Chwalińska (born 2001), tennis player

== Twin towns – sister cities ==
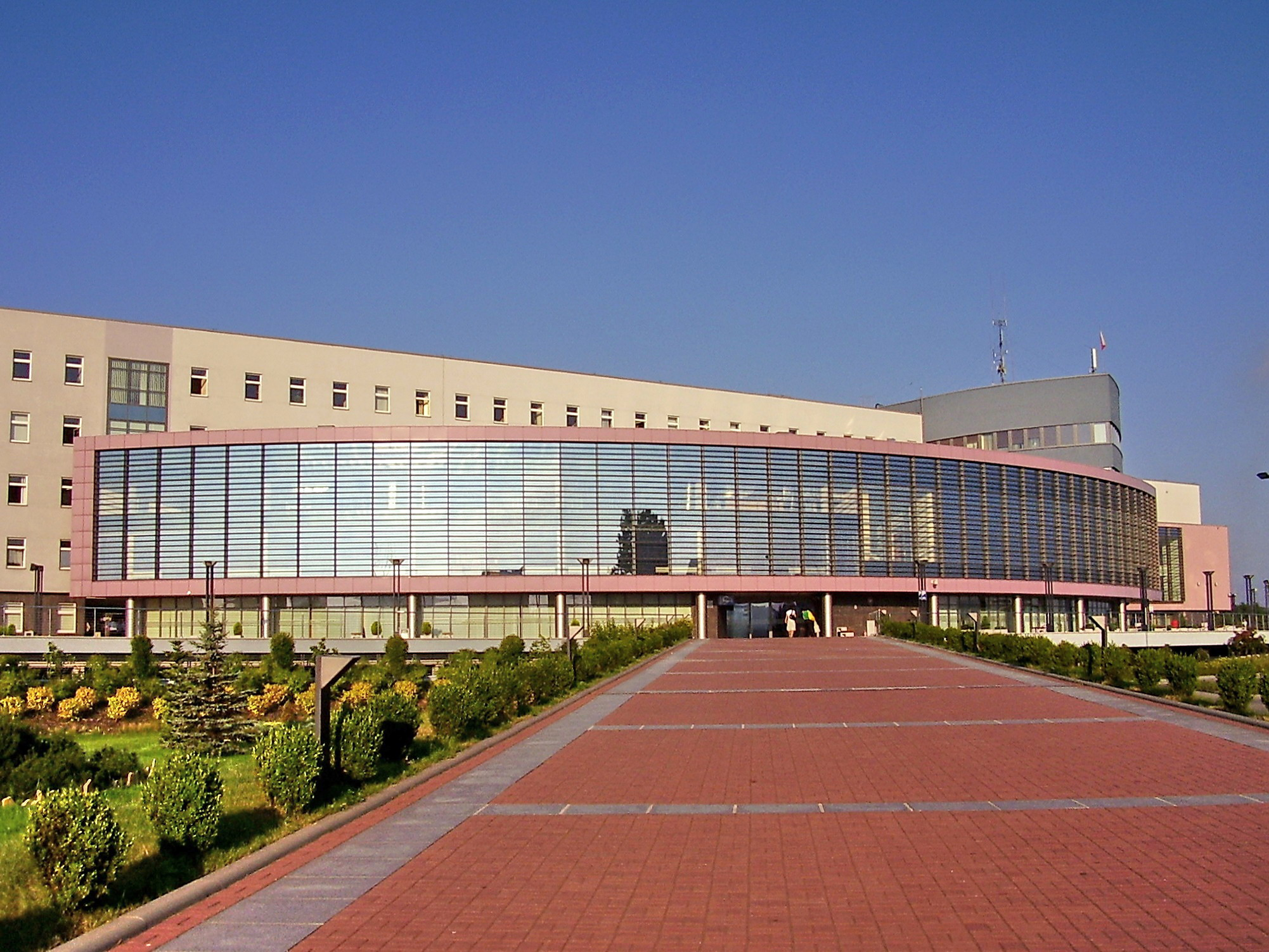
Municipal Office

Dąbrowa Górnicza is twinned with:

- Câmpulung Moldovenesc, Romania
- Mediaș, Romania
- Studénka, Czech Republic
