= Chełm–Kovel railway =

Chełm–Kovel railway line
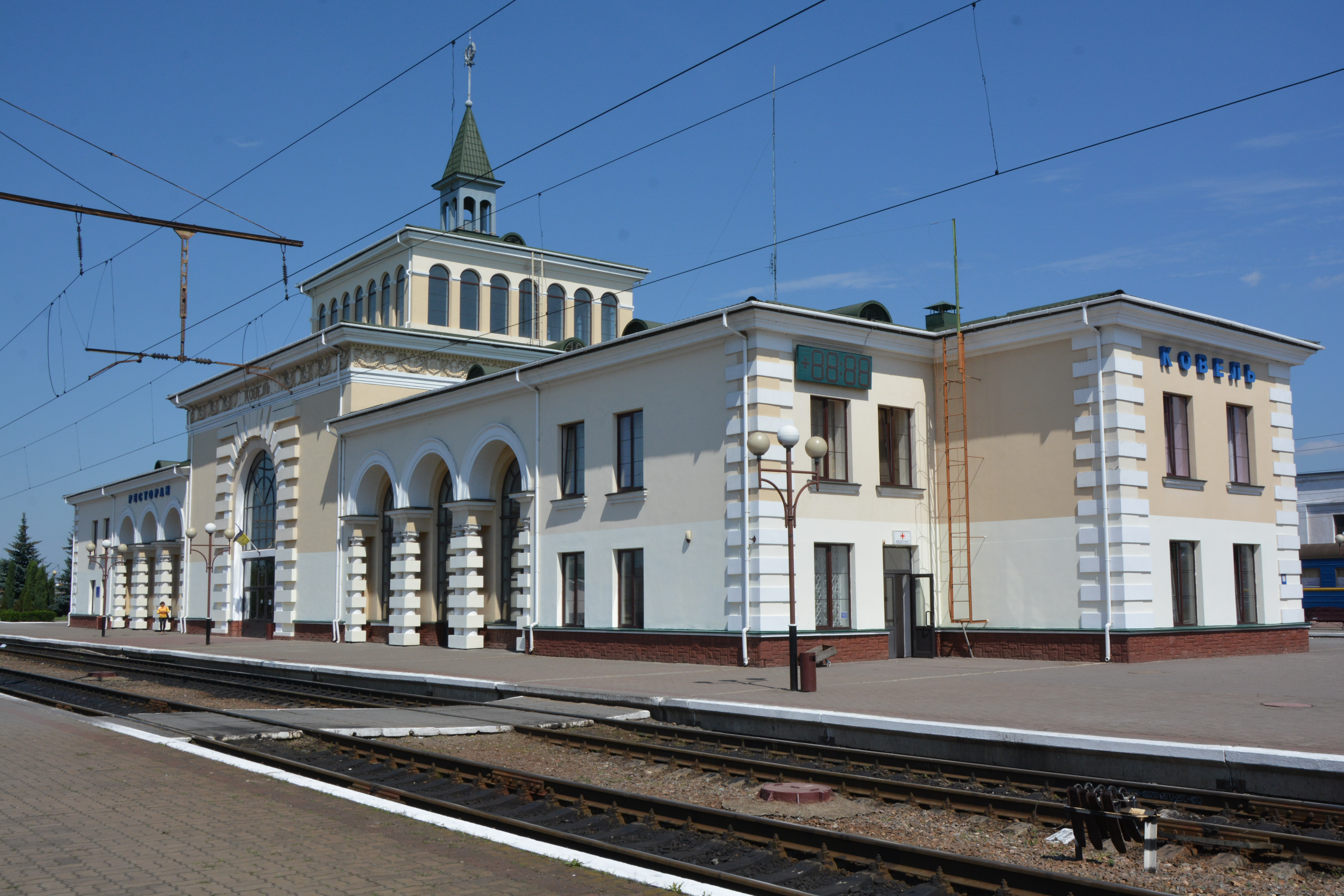
- Kovel railway station, pictured in August 2015

Overview
- Termini: Chełm railway station; Kovel railway station
- Stations: 10

Service
- Type: freight and passenger
- Operators: Ukrainian Railways; Polish State Railways; PKP Polskie Linie Kolejowe; PKP Cargo

History
- Opened: 1877

Technical
- Track length: 85 km (53 mi)
- Track gauge: 1,435 mm (4 ft 8 1/2 in); 1,520 mm (4 ft 11 27/32 in)
- Electrification: Only on the Polish side: 3 kV DC Chełm — Dorohusk railway station 1435 mm
- Operating speed: 100 km/h (62 mph)

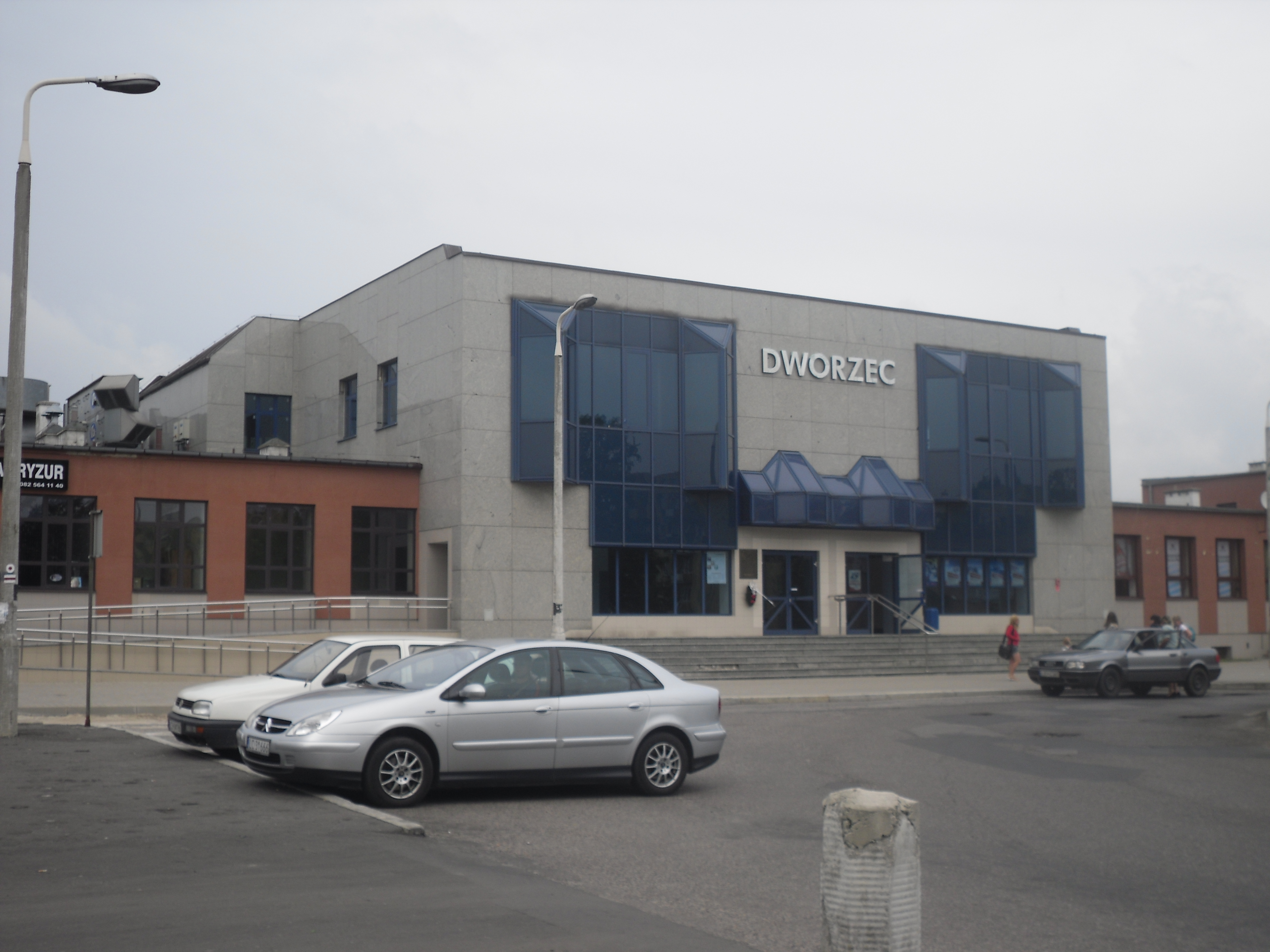
Chełm railway station

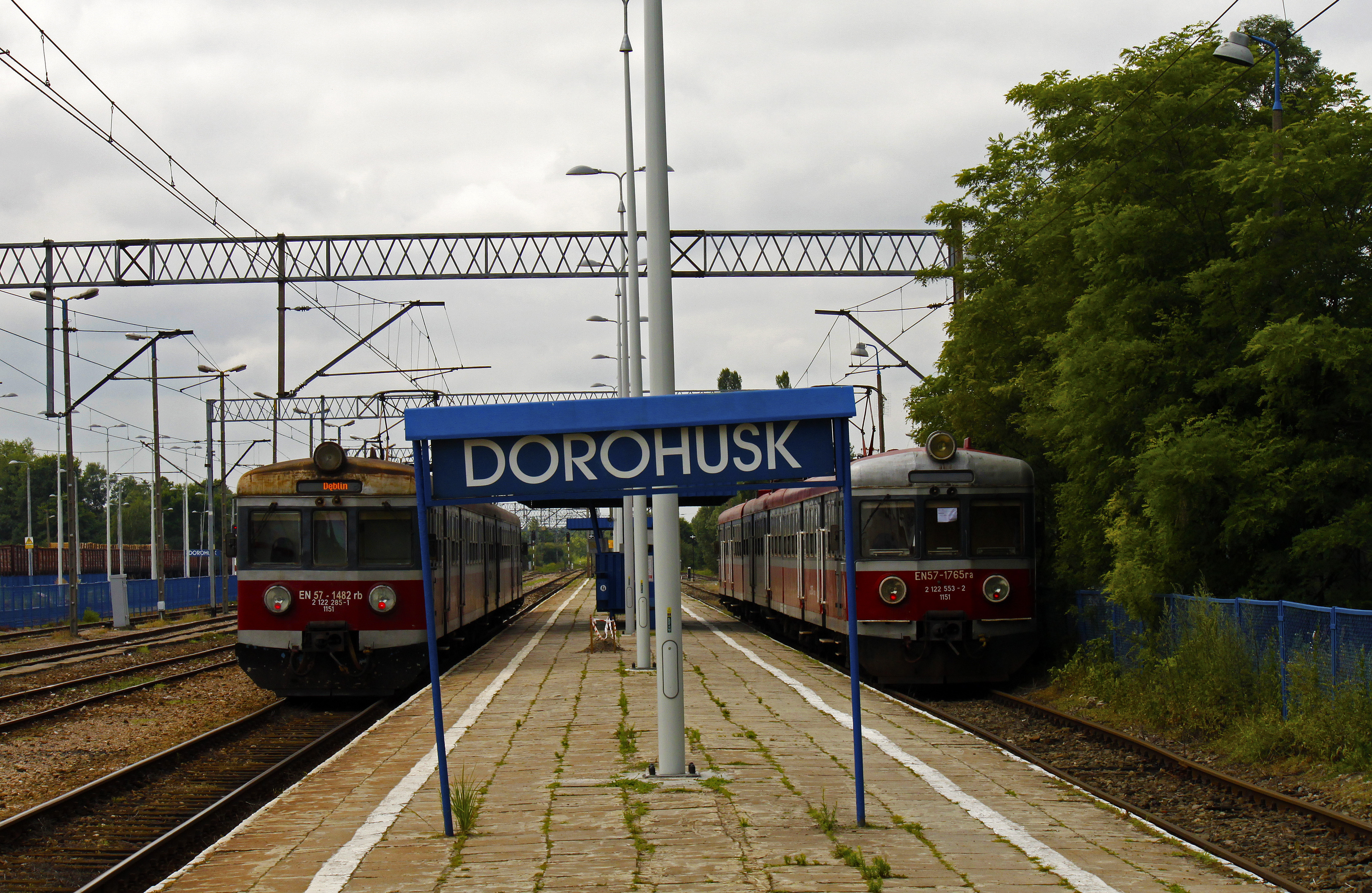
The platform at Dorohusk railway station and the EN57 electric trains

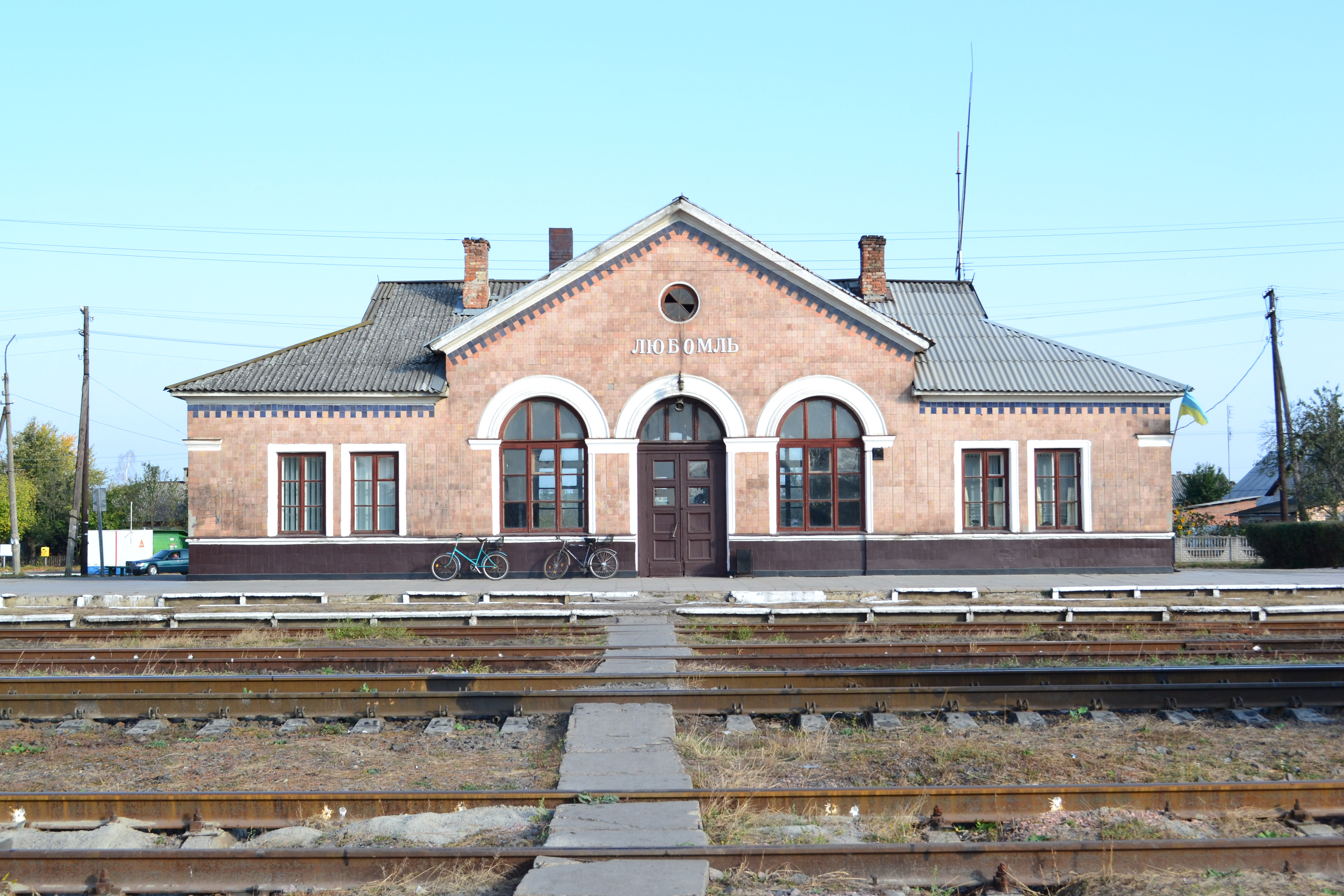
Liuboml railway station

The Chełm–Kovel railway line (Note: Polish: Linia kolejowa Chełm – Kowel. Ukrainian: Залізниця Ковель — Холм, romanized: Zaliznycja Kovelj – Kholm.) between the Ukrainian Kovel railway station and the Polish Chełm railway station is a 85-kilometre-long double-track line (with track gauges of 1435 mm (standard gauge) and 1520 mm). The Polish section which is on European standard gauge is electrified, whilst the other sections are not. With the exception of a few kilometres before Kovel, the two tracks run parallel to one another. The uniqueness of this railway lies in the fact that tracks of different gauges enter a neighbouring country. In Ukraine, the 1520 mm gauge predominates, but the 1435 mm gauge runs as far as Kovel (65 km). In Poland, the 1435 mm gauge predominates, but the broad gauge (1520 mm) runs as far as Chełm and a little further (30 km).

== History ==
=== 1877—1945 ===
The modern railway line from Kovel in Ukraine to Chełm in Poland dates back to 1877, when the Vistula Railway was opened. During the era of Tsarist Russia, which at that time controlled most of the modern territories of Poland and Ukraine, a 1524 mm gauge railway was built using private capital, running from Kovel to the Russian-Prussian border at Mława. The railway line to Kovel had already been completed in 1873, running from Kyiv via Zdolbuniv and on to Brest-Litovsk.

From the very beginning, the line was double-track. From 1915, the track gauge was standard or European, that is, 1435 mm. Following the end of the First World War, Wołyń Voivodeship (1921–1939) became part of the Second Polish Republic, and thus the entire railway line came under the control of Poland and its railway authority — the Polish State Railways (PKP).

=== 1945–1991 ===
Further changes took place following the end of the Second World War. As a result of the decisions taken at the Yalta Conference, the territory from Kovel to the Western Buh came under the control of the Soviet Union, whilst the area west of the Buh became the Polish People’s Republic. The Soviet section of the line was consequently converted to 1524 mm gauge. However, one track was left at 1435 mm gauge to ensure unimpeded connections with Kovel and other stations on this section. The reason for this was that freight trains were arriving from Germany carrying war booty from the defeated country: vehicles, factory machinery, steam locomotives and various other equipment. Moreover, Poland was already within the USSR’s sphere of political and economic influence. Consequently, the 65 km Kovel–Yahodyn–state border section had two parallel tracks of two different gauges. During the Soviet era, this line served both freight and passenger transport needs in the region.

It was also of strategic importance from a military perspective. This was because, in the German Democratic Republic (Western Group of Forces) and in Polish People’s Republic (Northern Group of Armed Forces) were home to military units of the Soviet Armed Forces following the Second World War. Every spring and autumn (when personnel rotations took place), military trains travelled from east to west and vice versa. Military units, together with their equipment on flat lorries and personnel in ‘teplushkas’ (covered carriages fitted with bunks and ‘burzhuyka’ stoves), were transferred to similarly equipped carriages, but on a different gauge.

The following stations were in operation: Yahodyn, Liuboml, Macejiv (Ukrainian: Мацеїв; Polish: Maciejów; located in the modern town of Lukiv), and Kovel. The following were mothballed: Skyby, Pidhorodne (now the Pidhorodne I station), Novi Koshari, and Cherkasy-Volynski. They had station buildings, signal boxes on either side, railroad switches and semaphores, both for incoming and outgoing trains.

Running parallel to the Kovel–Yahodyn railway, a few kilometres to the south, was the current route of the Highway M07 of Ukraine (constructed 1967–1983), known as the ‘betonka’ (concrete road). Concrete roads also ran from it to the railway, leading to the loading bays at the stations in Novi Koshari, Macejiv, Pidhorodne, in the forest southeast of Skyby station, from where two tracks ran on a single line to Liuboml. Military transhipments mainly took place in Liuboml and Macejiv. At the same time, at Cherkasy-Volynski station, which is currently a stopping point, there were 8 tracks with a gauge of 1435 mm and 4 tracks with a gauge of 1520 mm.

The broad-gauge and European-gauge lines were also used for civilian freight between Poland and the USSR. Running alongside the European-gauge track was a second broad-gauge line, which ran from Kovel to Macejiv. Two trains could run in opposite directions simultaneously on this section, which was very convenient.

From the 1970s onwards, work began on converting the broad gauge from 1524 mm to 1520 mm.

A diesel locomotive depot was built near the Depo ("Depot") station in 1981 and remains in operation to this day. In 1984, the Poles electrified their section of the 1435 mm gauge line with 3000 V direct current from Chełm to Dorohusk. The broad gauge line has been operated by diesel locomotives.

Passenger services ran regularly on the Kovel–Yahodyn–Kovel section. Cross-border passenger services operated only for a short period in the first half of the 1960s. Also, in the late 1980s, passenger services began from Kovel to Zielona Góra, operated by PKP, and the Kyiv–Chełm train, operated by the USSR Ministry of Railways. There were also other short-term services via Izov (a border checkpoint) and Yahodyn. This service operated up to and including the year 2000, when work began on installing the catenary system at Kovel station for the electrification of the Kivertsi–Kovel section. The Kovel–Yahodyn section was served by steam locomotives, and later by diesel locomotives, from the Kovel station locomotive depot.

Kovel served as a major transhipment station. At Yahodyn station, high-quality Silesian coal was transhipped, which was exported from the mines of the Upper Silesian Coal Basin in Poland.

=== 1991–present ===
Since the independence of Ukraine in 1991, the Kovel–Yahodyn–State Border section has been under the management of Ukrainian Railways.

In the 1990s and 2000s times, the decommissioned stations Cherkasy-Volynski, Novi Koshari, Pidhorodne, Skyby have been closed down and reclassified as stops. The tracks have been dismantled; signal boxes, semaphores and station buildings have been dismantled and left to fall into disrepair; all that remains are overgrown traces of the former tracks, half-ruined signal boxes and the ruins of other station buildings. As of 2021, the station buildings in Cherkasy-Volynski and Pidhorodne have been preserved. The additional broad-gauge line (on the Kovel–Macejiv section), which ran alongside the standard-gauge line, has also been dismantled.

During the electrification works in Kovel (2001), the 1,435 mm track (shared with the 8th 1,520 mm track) from the station to the Western Freight Yard was removed. Consequently, it became problematic to accommodate passenger trains at the station. Locomotives were unable to overtake the train and move to the other end to take the lead.

Until 2012, a high-speed train ran between Kyiv and Berlin. Before the COVID-19 pandemic lockdown in 2020, the timetable included a service between Kyiv and Warsaw. The wheel sets were changed at Yahodyn station.

As of May 2022, the Chełm–Kovel railway was the longest standard-gauge track in Ukraine. In May 2021, Ukrainian Railways started electrifying and modernising this route. Specialised freight fleets at Kovel station compatible with the European network had not been in use for almost 30 years, however.

== Poland ==
The Polish section of the Pryvilyanska Railway (State Border – Dorohusk – Chełm) was laid out as follows. From the border to Wólka Okopska, via the Dorohusk railway station near the border, there were also two tracks, both of different gauges, just as on the Soviet section of the railway. From Wólka-Okopska to Chełm, there were two 1,435 mm tracks and one 1,524 mm track. The standard (European) gauge is numbered 7 in the general Polish numbering system for railway lines. The broad gauge, accordingly, is numbered 63.

On the Polish side, several terminals have been built for the transhipment of fuel, lubricants and other cargo. These were situated in the woods, away from the railway line. The stations are: Dorohusk, Wólka-Okopska, Brzeźno (Березно) and Chełm.

The main freight stations are Chełm East and Chełm. Passenger services to Dorohusk operate from Lublin.

The section was served by steam locomotives, and later by diesel and electric locomotives from the Chełm and Lublin locomotive depots.

In Poland, the technical condition of the 1,435 mm gauge track is quite good; the 1,520 mm gauge track is slightly worse, but generally good as well.

=== Stations ===
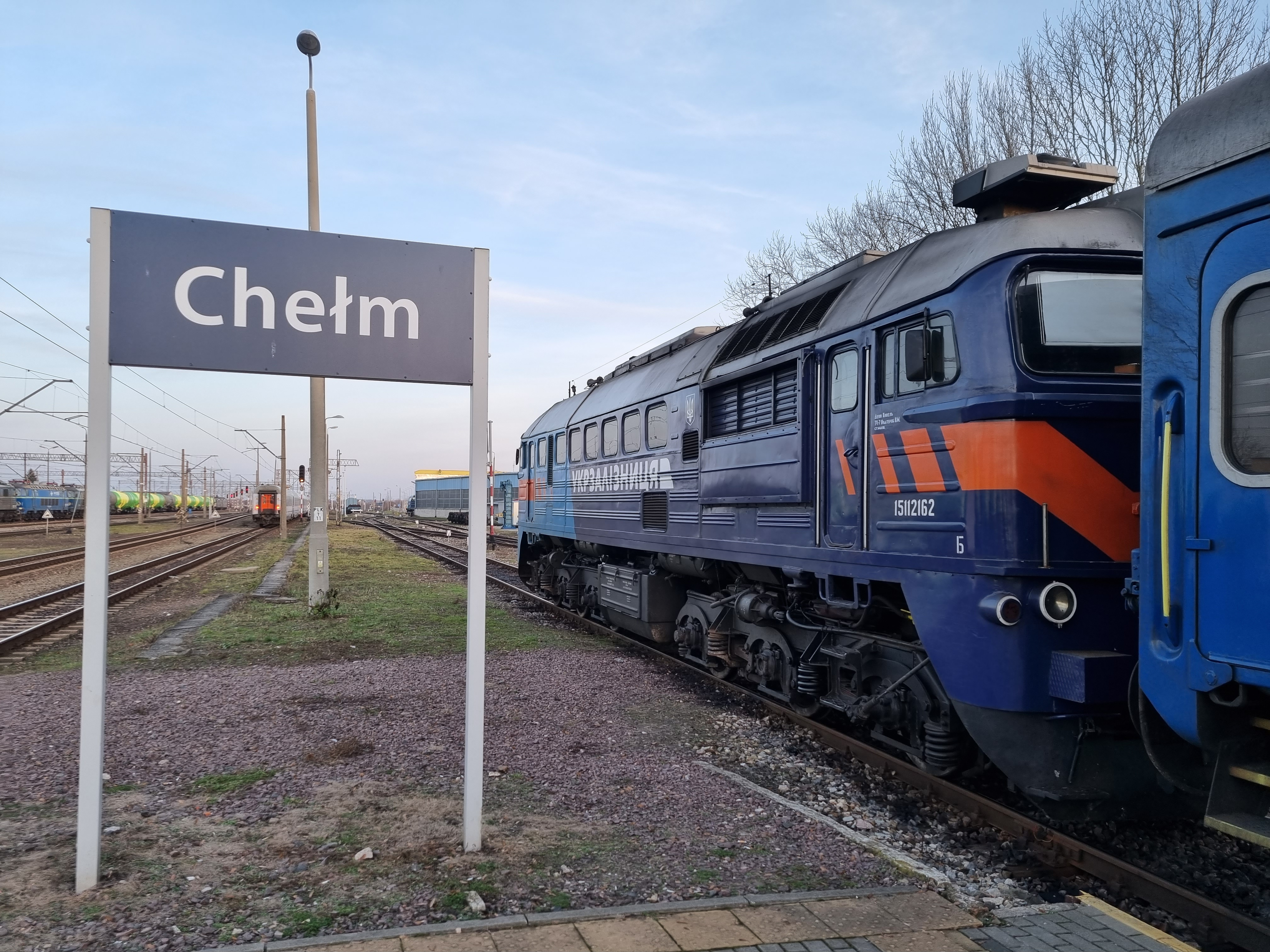
A Ukrainian Railways locomotive at Chełm railway station on 1 January 2023

The border station at Dorohusk railway station has five 1435 mm tracks and eight 1520 mm tracks. It is electrified and capable of handling commuter electric trains from Lublin. Customs checks on freight trains are carried out here. Towards Ukraine, only diesel-hauled trains are used. At the western end of the station there is a freight terminal, as well as a 1520 mm access track leading to the Daniel terminal.

Wólka Okopska has five 1435 mm tracks and two 1520 mm tracks. A 1435 mm access track branches off from it to the east, leading to the Daniel terminal (Даніель). Towards Chełm, there are two 1,435 mm tracks and one 1,520 mm track. On the Wólka Okopska–Brzeźno section, a 1,520 mm access track branches off from the broad gauge line to the Tezet terminal.

Brzeźno has four 1435 mm tracks and one 1520 mm track. A 1435 mm spur line branches off from it to the east, leading to the Tezet terminal.

Chełm East functions as a freight and sorting station, and also serves a cement works and a chalk mine (see Chełm Chalk Tunnels). It has 19 tracks of 1435 mm gauge and 5 of 1520 mm gauge. There are 6 transhipment ramps.

Chełm railway station is a junction station. In addition to the lines to Lublin and Dorohusk, there is also a branch line to Włodawa (Ukrainian: Володава, Volodava). It has 12 tracks of 1435 mm gauge and 2 of 1520 mm gauge. It has two freight ramps for transhipment, a small locomotive depot, a fleet of passenger carriages with a washing facility, a wheel set replacement facility (used for locomotives), and a fuel depot. Passenger traffic stands at 1 million people annually. Twenty-one commuter trains run daily towards Lublin. The final 7 km of 1520 mm gauge track runs westwards from the station to Zawadówka railway station (to the fuel terminal).

== Ukraine ==
In Ukraine, the technical condition of the 1520 mm gauge railway track is quite good, whilst that of the 1435 mm gauge track is poor.

=== Stations with a 1520 mm track gauge ===
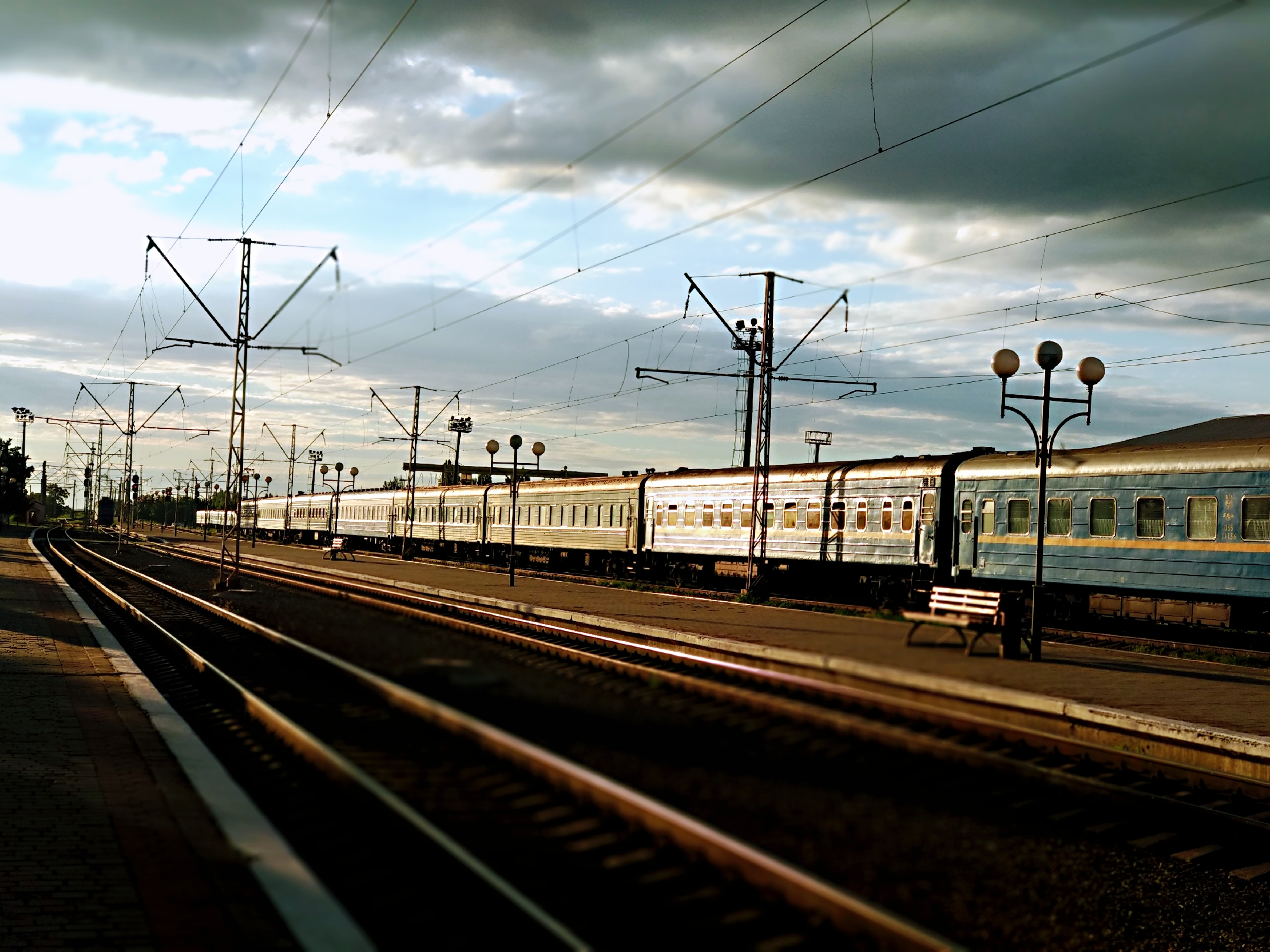
Kovel station in October 2020

The Kovel railway station is a junction station and the largest station in the area, comprising the Passenger Park (the station itself); the Volodymyr Park to the west of the station; and, to the east of the station, the following: the TCh-7 locomotive depot, Zdolbuniv Park, Peredgirochny Park, Transit Park, and the Western and Eastern Parks.

Macejiv station in Lukiv has five tracks. There used to be a siding here leading to the ‘Lukivskyi Building Materials Plant’ at the eastern end of the station, where chalk was quarried and lime was produced. The plant had its own TGK-type shunting locomotive.

Liuboml station has four tracks at the station and access tracks leading to the bread-processing plant and the former military base, which has a loading ramp.

Yahodyn railway station has just 7 tracks. In 1995, a wheel-set shunting point was built at the station. There are also access tracks leading to the coal transhipment point.

==== Former stations ====
Skyby station had two 1520 mm tracks and a siding that ran into the forest to a ramp south-east of Skyby, where a 1435 mm track also terminated.

Pidhorode Station (now Pidhorodne I) had at least three tracks, one of which was next to the ramp.

Novi Koshari station also had a loading bay and at least three tracks.

After the Second World War, Cherkasy-Volynski had four tracks. The tracks ran from the station to Verbka and Liublynets-Volynskyj. These were bypass lines of strategic importance branches intended to serve as alternatives in the event of the Kovel railway junction being put out of action. From Verbka, in turn, the railway ran to Kamin-Kashyrskyj near the village of Bakiv (where there was a railway bridge over the river Turiya). There was a similar branch line to Bilyn-Volynskyj, where it joined the Kovel–Sarny railway line. The branch line leading to Liublynets connected with the Kovel— Lviv on the Kovel–Liublynets-Volynskyi section. The branch line to Verbka ran alongside a European-gauge track serving a similar purpose. In the late 1990s, all these tracks were dismantled. Their route is still visible on Google Maps (as of 2022).

=== Stations with a 1435 mm track gauge ===
The stations at Kovel, Yahodyn, Liuboml and Macejiv had, and still have, a track gauge of 1435 mm.

Kovel railway station has only one combined track (Track 9), which runs alongside the platform towards the depot and also has tracks in the locomotive depot. There are also tracks in the Western and Eastern parks, from where they were extended in 2018 to the grain elevator at the Kovel Grain Sales Centre.

Yahodyn railway station has a total of 10 European-standard tracks. In 1995, a wheel-set shunting facility was built at the station. There are also access tracks leading to the coal transhipment facility.

Liuboml had three tracks at the station and one dead-end track, which once led to a ramp at the military base (western end). The base is no longer there, but the ramp remains and is still in use. As of 2021, one standard-gauge track, combined with a 1520 mm track (track 3), has been dismantled at the station. This means that, at the time, there are two 1435 mm tracks at the station.

There are currently two tracks at Macejiv station. There used to be at least three. There is also a ramp at the station itself, which is accessed on one side by a 1435 mm track. There is now a loading terminal here where rapeseed and grain are loaded onto special wagons and transported to Poland.

==== Former stations ====
Skyby station had two 1435 mm tracks, and a siding ran into the forest to a ramp south-east of Skyby, which was also served by a 1520 mm track.

At Pidhorodne station (now Pidhorodne I), there were at least three tracks, one of which was next to the ramp.

Novi Koshari station also had at least three tracks and a ramp.

After the Second World War, the Cherkasy–Volynski line had eight tracks. A track branched off from the station towards Verbka, which was combined with a broad-gauge line. This was a strategic bypass branch in case the Kovel railway junction was put out of action. As for the route to Verbka, the European gauge line ran from Kovel, as there was a locomotive depot near the now-defunct station Baza (on the line to Kamin-Kashyrsky) near the southern outskirts of the village of Dubove, there was a depot for steam locomotives, including those serving the European gauge line. These were captured German locomotives. By the late 1990s, all these tracks had been dismantled. On Google Maps, the route they followed is still visible (as of 2022).

== See also ==
- Rail transport in Ukraine
- Batovo–Korolevo railway, standard- and broad-gauge railway in Zakarpattia Oblast of similar length
- Debrecen–Sighetu Marmației railway, standard-gauge railway in Ukraine, Romania and Hungary
- Linia Hutnicza Szerokotorowa, broad-gauge railway from Ukraine deep into Poland
- Uzhhorod–Košice broad-gauge track, broad-gauge railway from Ukraine deep into Slovakia
- Vistula Railway

== Bibliography ==
- EC (11 July 2023). "Strategy for the EU integration of the Ukrainian and Moldovan rail systems". transport.ec.europa.eu. European Commission. (160 pages).
