= Uhryniv =

Uhryniv is a name of number of villages in Western Ukraine.

== Villages ==
- Uhryniv, Tysmenytsia Raion
- Uhryniv, Lviv Oblast
- Uhryniv, Ternopil Oblast
- Uhryniv, Volyn Oblast

== Railway stations ==
- Uhryniv railway station, a railway stop of the Lviv Railways Ivano-Frankivsk administration

== See also ==
- Staryi Uhryniv, a village of Kalush Raion, Ivano-Frankivsk Oblast
- Seredniy Uhryniv, a village of Kalush Raion, Ivano-Frankivsk Oblast
