= Ivano-Frankivsk railway station =

Railway station in Ivano-Frankivsk, Ukraine

Ivano-Frankivsk Івано-Франківськ
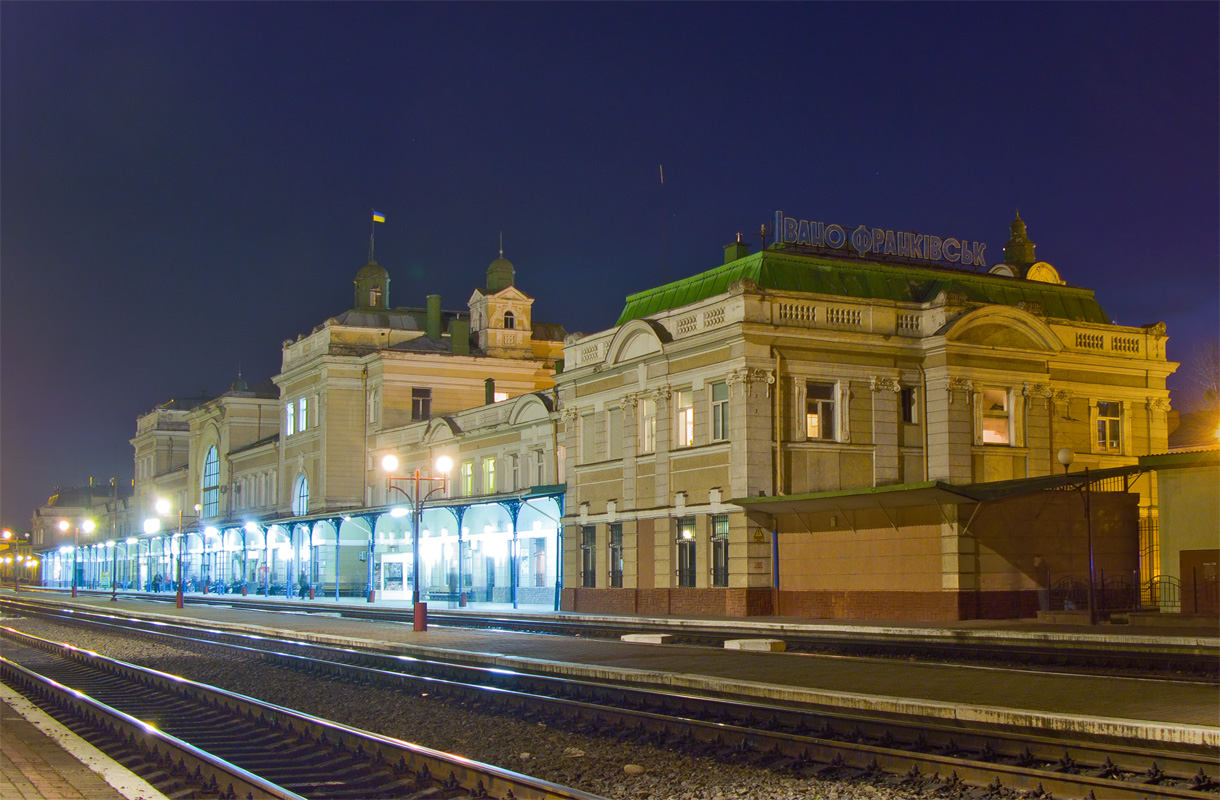
- Terminal of Ivano-Frankivsk station

General information
- Location: Ukraine, Ivano-Frankivsk
- Coordinates: 48°55′31″N 24°43′24″E
- System: Lviv Railway terminal
- Owner: Ukrainian Railways
- Operator: Lviv Railways
- Platforms: 1 (main platform), 2 (island platform)
- Tracks: 6
- Connections: Bus terminal City bus and trolleybus

Construction
- Structure type: At-grade
- Parking: Yes

Other information
- Station code: 388404

History
- Opened: 1866
- Rebuilt: 1906
- Electrified: 1897

Services
Preceding station	Lviv Railways	Following station

Immovable Monument of Local Significance of Ukraine
- Official name: Залізничний вокзал (Railway station building)
- Type: Architecture
- Reference no.: 2093-ІФ
Location

Ivano-Frankivsk (Ukrainian: Івано-Франківськ) is the main station of the Ivano-Frankivsk directory of Lviv Railways.

== History ==
The railway station in Ivano-Frankivsk was established in 1866 when the city of Stanislau was part of the Kingdom of Galicia and Lodomeria within the Austro-Hungary. It became one of the oldest train stations in Ukraine. The station was built as part of the expansion of the Galician Railway of Archduke Charles Louis from Lemberg (Lviv) towards Czernowitz (Chernivtsi). Along with the station right next to it was found a machine maintenance shop that later was transformed into a steam locomotive maintenance shop.

The terminal of the station was built using elements of the Mauritanian style. The first train that traveled from Lemberg to Czernowitz stopped at Stanislau on September 1, 1866. In 1894 Stanislau became the district center of the Austrian State Railways. The railways terminal became the first city's structure in Ivano-Frankivsk that was electrified on January 13, 1897. The electricity was installed by the German company out of Berlin Siemens & Halske.

From 1903 through 1906 under the leadership of the Vienna architect E.Baudisch, the terminal was expanded. A railway post office was built nearby.

== Trains ==
- Ivano-Frankivsk – Kyiv
- Ivano-Frankivsk – Kharkiv
- Ivano-Frankivsk – Novooleksiivka

Previous station	Operator	Next Station
Uhryniv	Lviv Railways	Khryplyn
