= Dorohusk railway station =

Railway station in Poland

Dorohusk
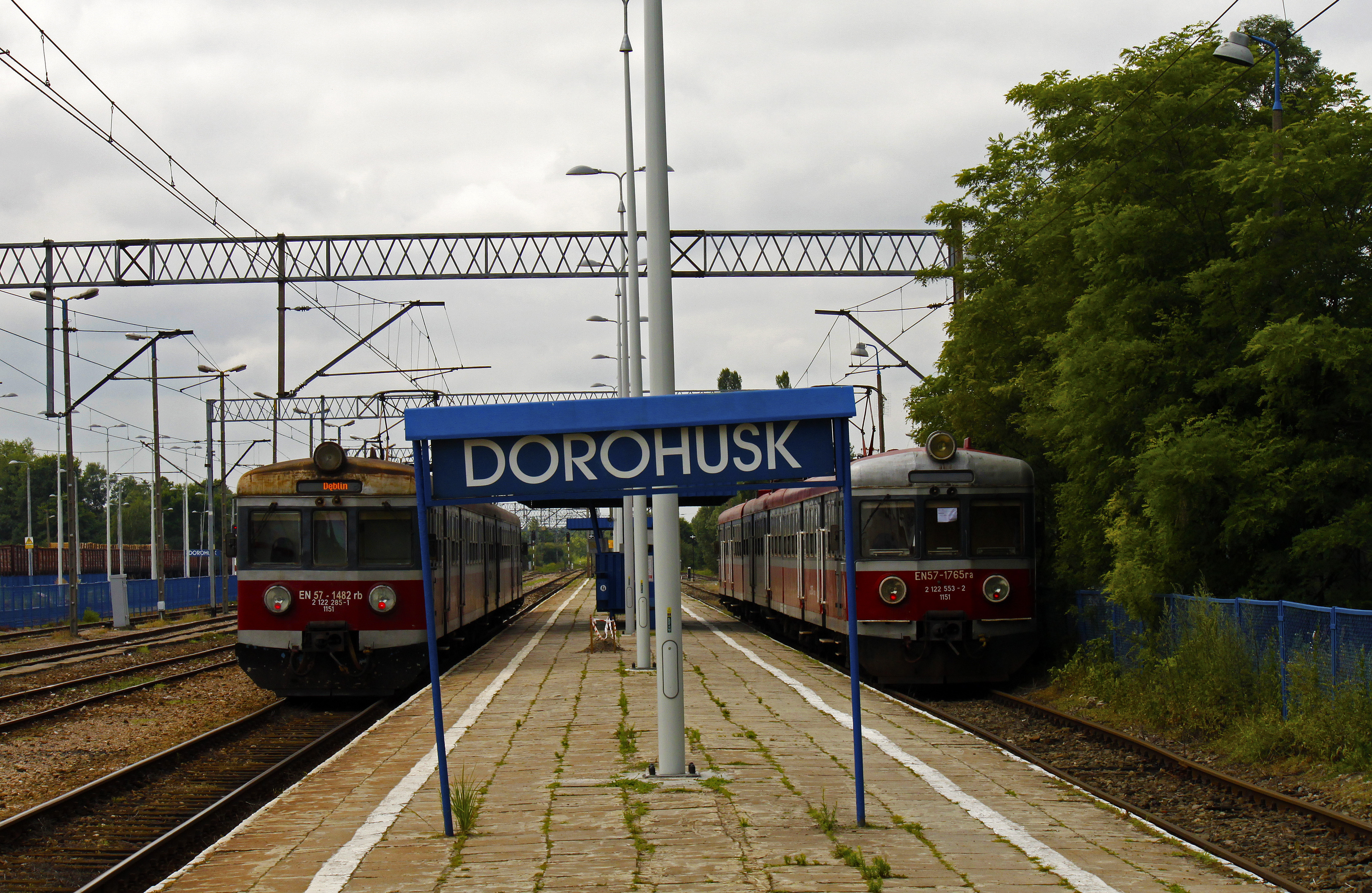

General information
- Location: Dorohusk; Poland
- Coordinates: 51.1722°N 23.7839°E
- Owner: Polish State Railways
- Platforms: 2
- Tracks: 4

History
- Opened: 1877
Location

Dorohusk is a railway station in Poland in Dorohusk, on the border with Ukraine, opposite Yahodyn railway station.

== Train services ==
The station is served by the following services:

Preceding station	PKP Intercity	Following station
Wólka Okopska towards Chełm or Warszawa Wschodnia	IC	Yahodyn Terminus
Wólka Okopska towards Warszawa Zachodnia	Kyiv-Express	Yahodyn towards Kyiv-Pasazhyrskyi
Preceding station	Ukrainian Railways	Following station
Wólka Okopska toward Chełm	Chełm–Kovel	Yahodyn toward Kovel
Wólka Okopska toward Chełm	Chełm–Kovel standard-gauge railway	Yahodyn toward Kovel
