= Kovel railway station =

Railway station in Kovel, Ukraine

Kovel Ковель
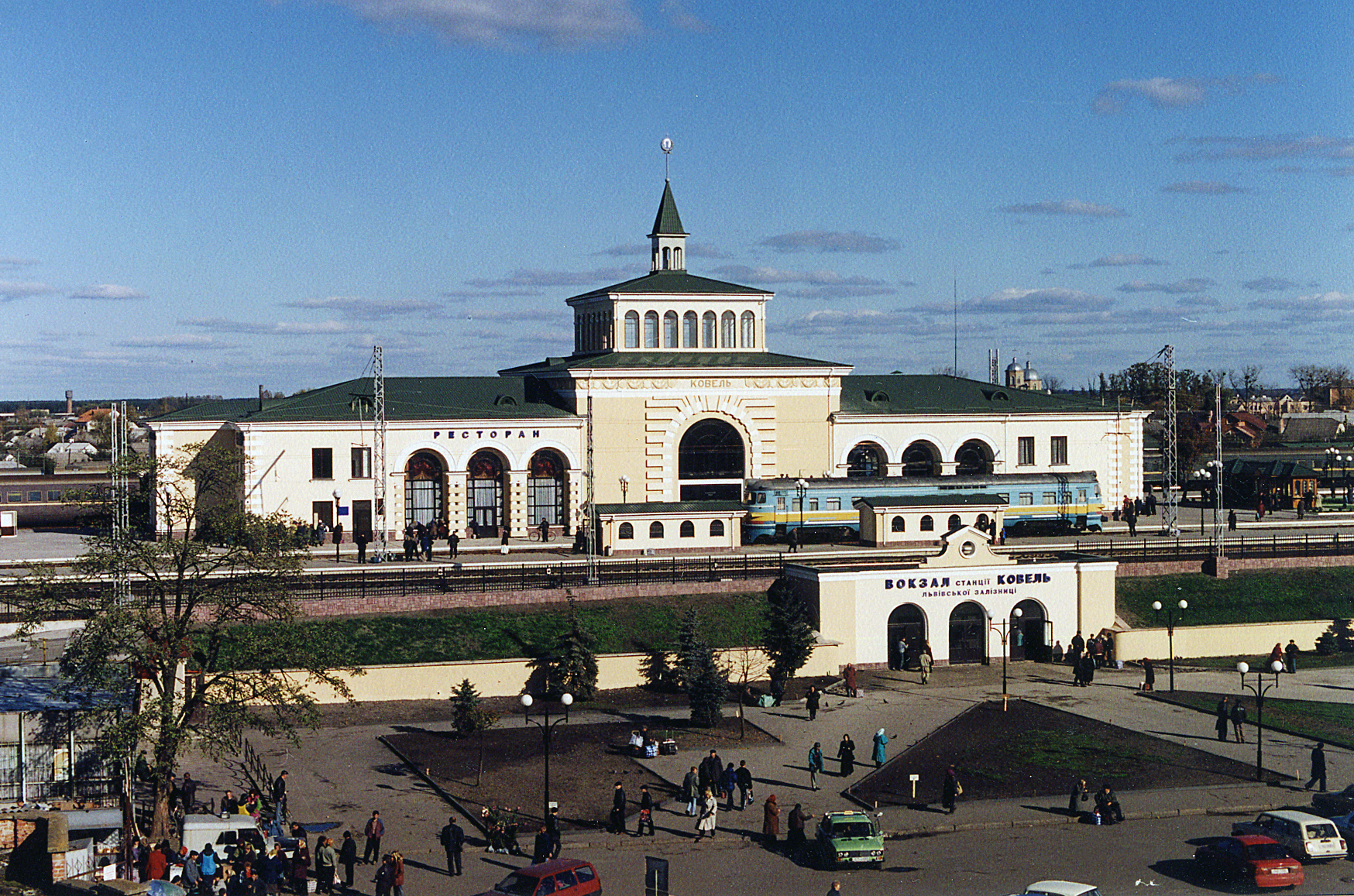
- Kovel station

General information
- Location: Ukraine, Kovel
- Coordinates: 51°13′18″N 24°42′43″E
- System: Lviv Railway terminal
- Owner: Ukrainian Railways
- Operator: Lviv Railways
- Platforms: 1 (main platform), 2 (island platform)
- Tracks: 20
- Connections: Bus terminal

Construction
- Structure type: At-grade
- Parking: Yes

Other information
- Station code: 354003

History
- Opened: 1873

Services
Preceding station	Ukrainian Railways	Following station
Terminus	Kovel–Sarny	448 km toward Zdolbuniv
Terminus	Kovel–Zdolbuniv	Bilyi Nalyv toward Zdolbuniv
Cherkasy-Volynskyi toward Chełm	Chełm–Kovel	Terminus
Mahary toward Chełm	Chełm–Kovel standard-gauge railway	Terminus
Long-distance trains
Yahodyn toward Warsaw West	Kyiv-Express	Kyiv-Pasazhyrskyi Terminus
Suspended/closed services
Preceding station	Ukrainian Railways	Following station
Verbka toward Kamin-Kashyrskyi	Kamin-Kashyrskyi–Kovel Closed 2024	Terminus
Verbka toward Brest	Best–Kovel Suspended since 2020	Terminus

Immovable Monument of Local Significance of Ukraine
- Official name: Залізничний вокзал (Railway station building)
- Type: Architecture
- Reference no.: 2290-Вл
Location

Kovel (Ukrainian: Ковель) is a railway hub of the Rivne directory of Lviv Railways. The Chełm–Kovel railway (both 1435 mm and 1520 mm gauge) links Kovel to Chełm in Poland, and represents the longest standard-gauge railway connecting Ukraine to the rest of Europe.

Along with Zabolottia railway station also serves as a rail border checkpoint at Belarus-Ukraine border.

Kovel Station also has rail yard and locomotive depot.

== Gallery ==
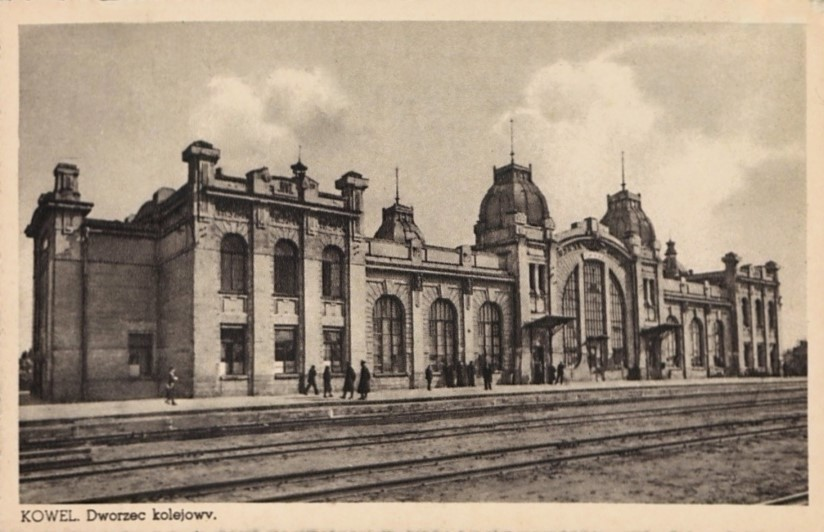
Rail station in 1914

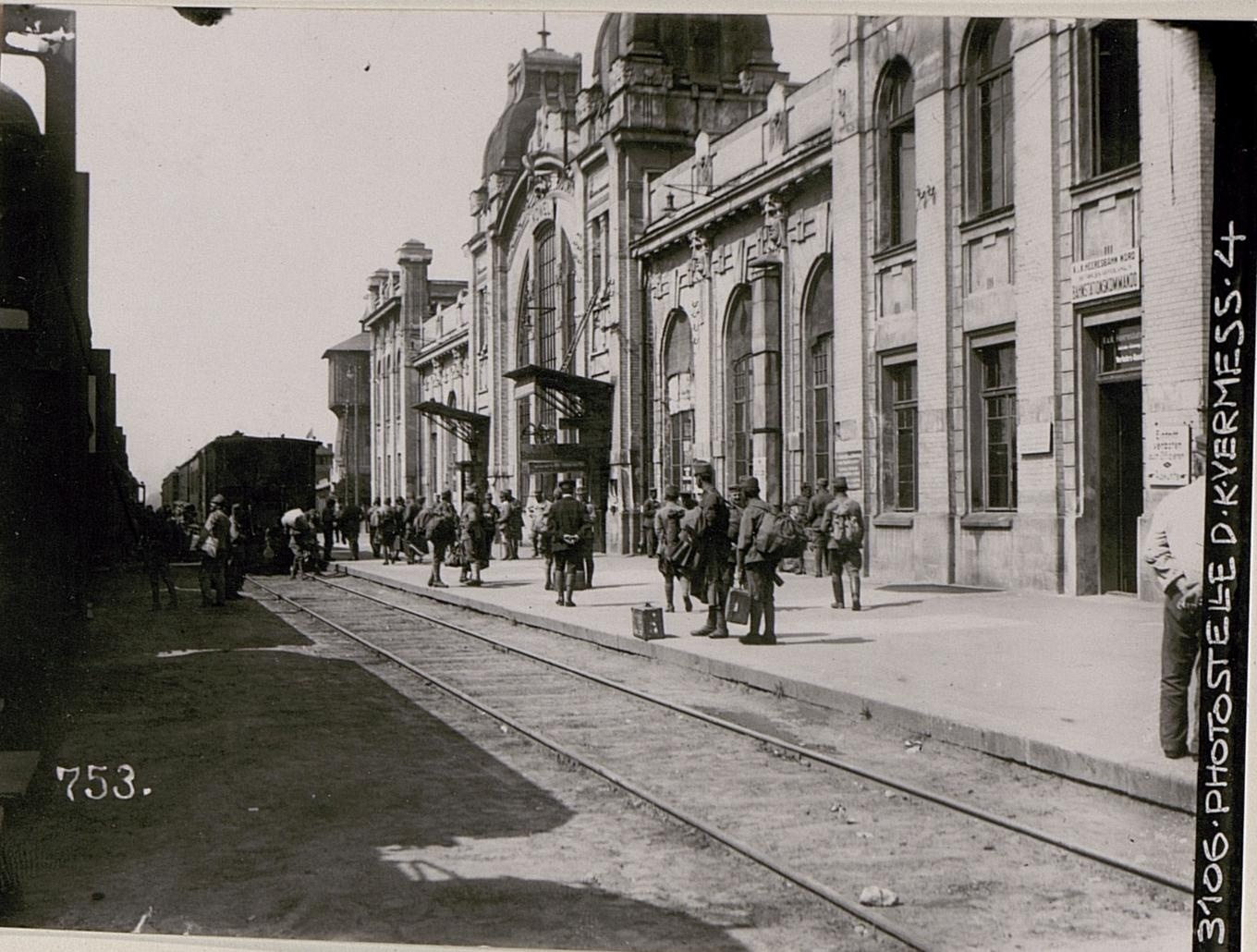
Rail station during World War I

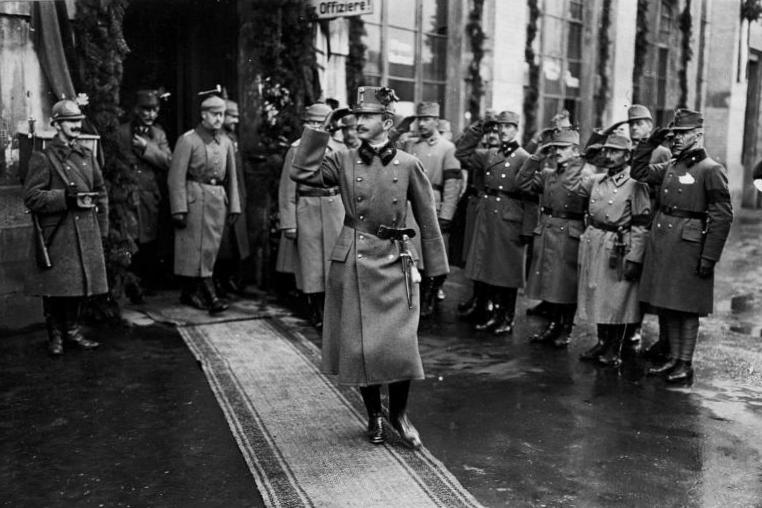
Kaiser Karl I in Kovel in 1917

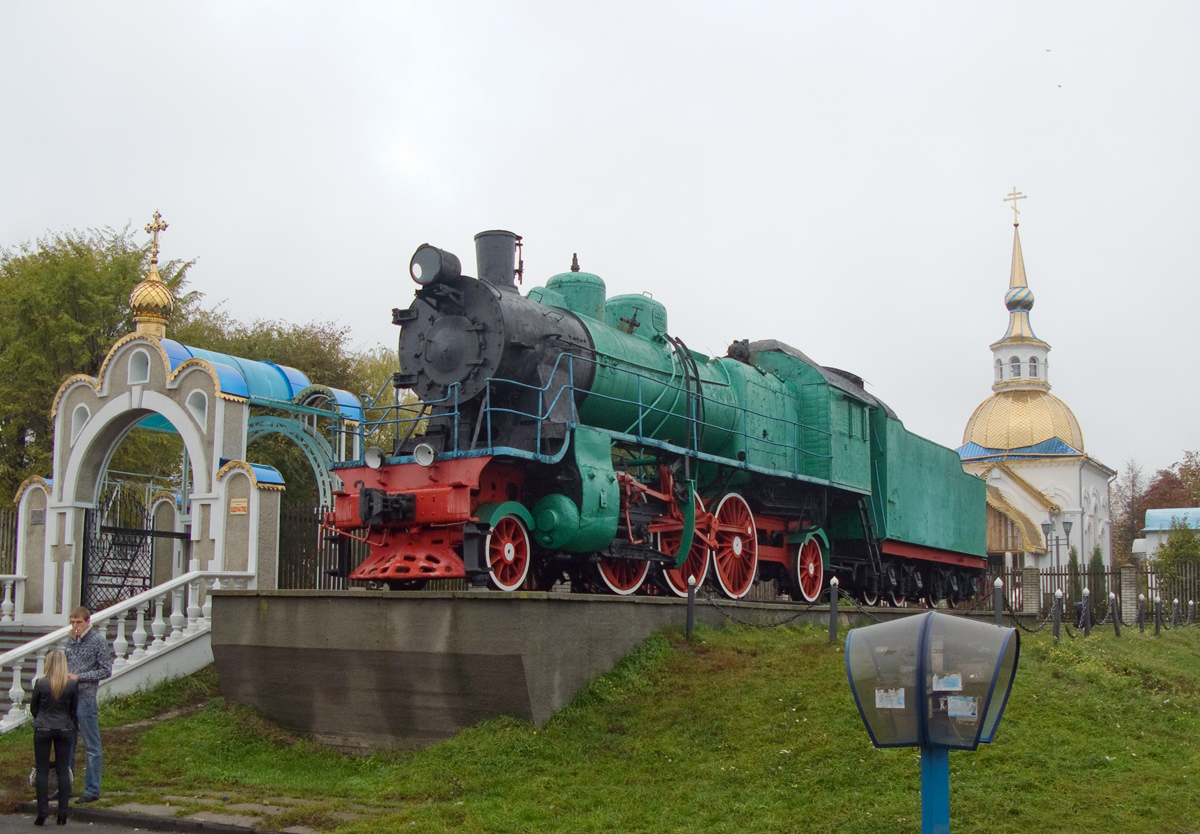
Monument of steam locomotive near the terminal (S^{u} locomotive)
