= Uhryniv railway station =

Railway station in Ukraine

Coordinates: 48.950602°N 24.712983°E

Uhryniv (Ukrainian: Угринів) is a railway stop that is located in village of Uhryniv, Ivano-Frankivsk Oblast in Ukraine. It is part of the Ivano-Frankivsk administration (Lviv Railways).

Among the services provided at the station is only embarkment and disembarkment of passengers for commuter and regional lines. There is no loading and unloading of luggage.

Previous station	Operator	Next Station
Yamnytsia	Lviv Railways	Ivano-Frankivsk
