= Yahodyn railway station =

Railway station in Ukraine

Yahodyn Ягодин
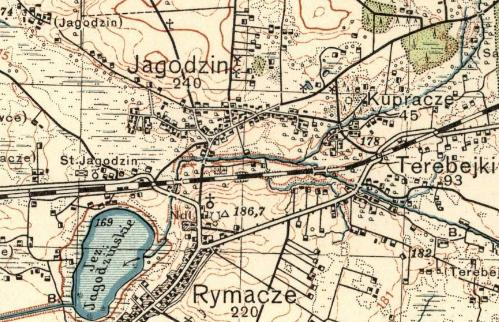
- 1933 map

General information
- Location: Yahodyn, Volyn Oblast, Ukraine
- Coordinates: 51.1981°N 23.8959°E
- System: Lviv Railways station
- Owner: Ukrainian Railways
- Operator: Lviv Railways
- Platforms: 2
- Tracks: 10 (8 in standard gauge)

Construction
- Parking: Yes

Other information
- Station code: 351306

History
- Opened: 1873

Services
Preceding station	PKP Intercity	Following station
Dorohusk towards Chełm or Warszawa Wschodnia	IC	Terminus
Preceding station	Ukrainian Railways	Following station
Dorohusk toward Chełm	Chełm–Kovel	Lyuboml toward Kovel
Dorohusk toward Chełm	Chełm–Kovel standard-gauge railway	Lyuboml toward Kovel
Long-distance trains
Dorohusk toward Warsaw West	Kyiv-Express	Kovel toward Kyiv-Pasazhyrskyi

Immovable Monument of Local Significance of Ukraine
- Official name: Залізничний вокзал (Railway station building)
- Type: Architecture
- Reference no.: 2290-Вл
Location

Yahodyn is a railway station in Ukraine on its border with Poland, opposite Dorohusk railway station in Poland. It is used by both passengers and freight, and bogies are exchanged here. There are plans for modernization. There is also a road crossing the border here.
