= Uhryniv rural hromada =

Hromada in Ivano-Frankivsk Oblast, Ukraine

Uhryniv rural hromada Угринівська сільська громада
- hromada
- Location within Ivano-Frankivsk Oblast Location within Ukraine
- Coordinates: 48°57′38″N 24°41′22″E
- Country: Ukraine
- Oblast: Ivano-Frankivsk Oblast
- Raion: Ivano-Frankivsk Raion
- Administrative center: Uhryniv

Area
  - Total: 176 km^{2} (68 sq mi)

Population (2018)
  - Total: 3,436
- Villages: 2
- Website: ugrynivska-gromada.gov.ua

Uhryniv rural hromada (Ukrainian: Угринівська сільська громада) is a hromada in Ukraine, in Ivano-Frankivsk Raion of Ivano-Frankivsk Oblast. The administrative center is the village of Uhryniv.

== Settlements ==
The hromada consists of 2 villages: Uhryniv, Kluziv.
