= Poland–Ukraine border =

International border

Polish and Ukrainian boundary markers

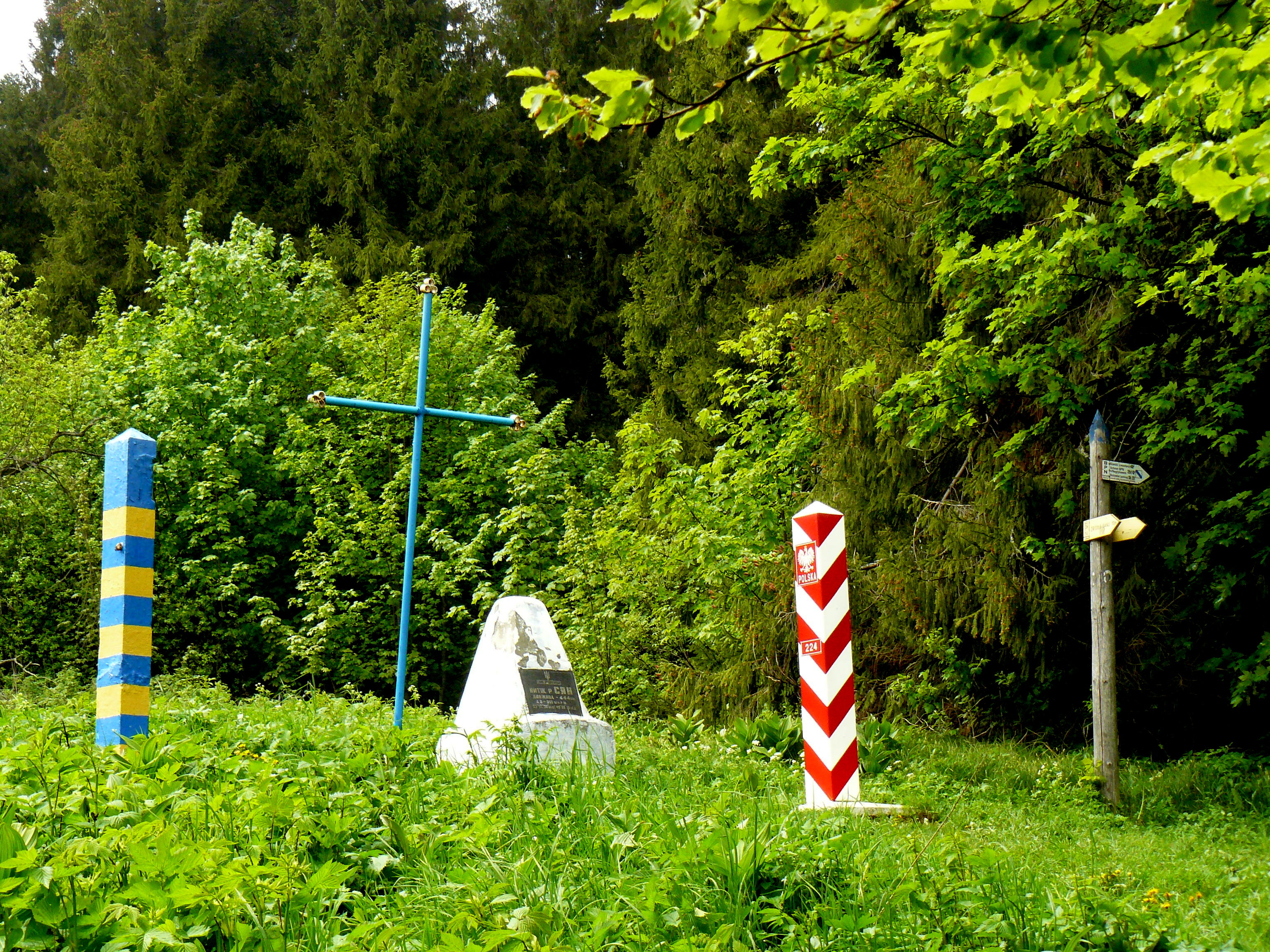
Source of the San, with Polish and Ukrainian border markers visible

Borders of Poland, with the Polish-Ukrainian border marked in yellow

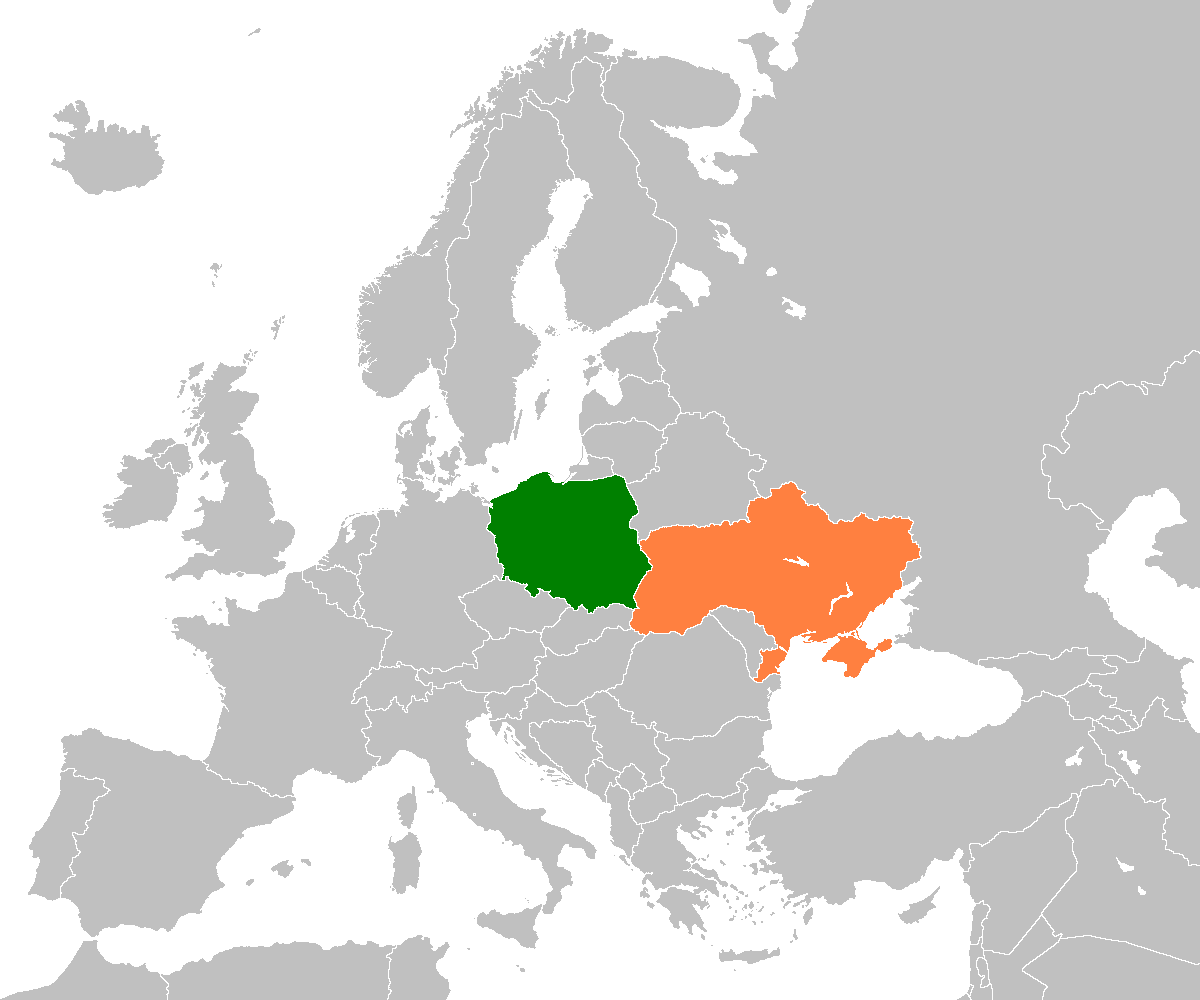
Poland and Ukraine within Europe

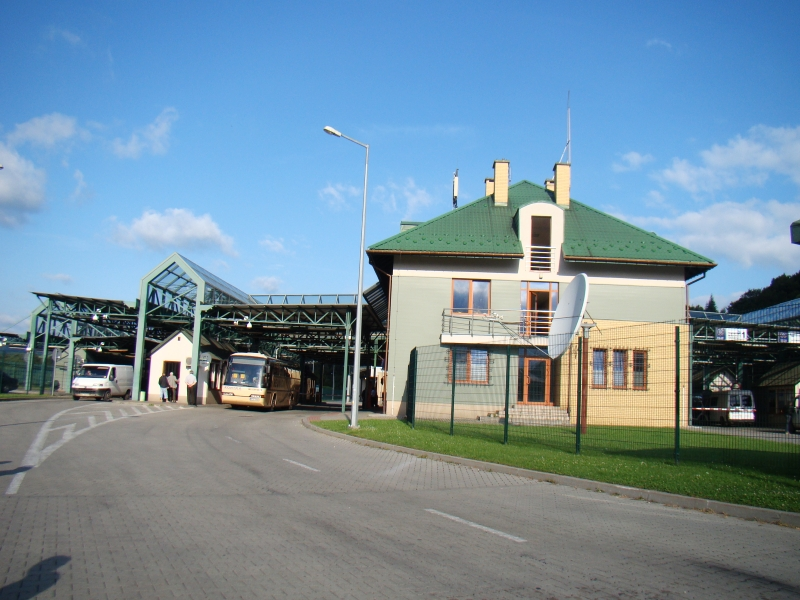
The Krościenko-Smilnytsya border checkpoint

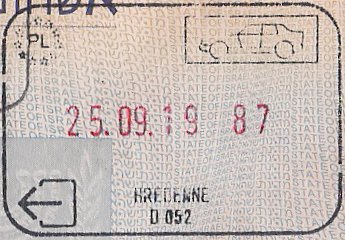
Exit passport stamp issued by the Polish Border Guard at the Hrebenne border crossing point

The Polish–Ukrainian border is the state border between Poland and Ukraine. It has a total length of 529 km (329 mi) to 535 km (332 mi) (sources vary).

== History ==
The Polish–Ukrainian border first came to be, briefly, in the aftermath of the Polish–Ukrainian War in 1919. The Treaty of Warsaw, signed in April 1920, divided the disputed territories in Poland's favor along the Zbruch River. A year after the treaty was signed, however, Ukraine lost its independence to the Soviet Union (Ukrainian–Soviet War), and its remaining territories were split between Poland and the Ukrainian Soviet Socialist Republic in the Peace of Riga.

During the collectivization of Ukrainian farmland in the first five-year plan and the Holodomor (Great Ukrainian Famine), numerous Soviet citizens of Ukrainian and Polish nationality fled across the border to Poland. Interviews of Soviet refugees by Polish border guards provided the first knowledge of the famine to the West. Poland also sent agents provocateur across the border in order to encourage Ukrainians to revolt against Soviet rule, which was ineffective and only increased Stalin's paranoia about rebellion and dissidence in the region.

Following the signing of the Ribbentrop-Molotov agreement and invasion of Poland by the Soviet Union, vast territories in eastern Poland were annexed to the Ukrainian Soviet Socialist Republic. The new border was short-lived, as Nazi Germany invaded the Soviet Union in Operation Barbarossa. The invasion of Ukraine began with the German 1st Panzer Army crossing the border and defeating the Soviet 5th Army in the Battle of Brody. In 1945, following the end of the war and the establishment of the Polish People's Republic, a new border was formed between the Ukrainian SSR and Poland based on the Yalta Agreement. As a result, Poland lost vast territories in Ukraine's favor, including the city of Lviv.

During the negotiations on the Polish–Soviet border agreement of August 1945, alongside the Polish-Ukrainian section of the border, the Polish side proposal was categorically rejected. Due to this, the Polish side proposed more modest changes, namely to transfer the railway junction in Khyriv (Polish: Chyrów) to Poland, in which two parallel main lines of national importance were connected. At the same time, Rava-Ruska was requested. In this town, located near the Curzon Line, three Polish and one Ukrainian railway line converged. Polish requests were completely rejected, only managing to slightly shift the border to the east near Przemyśl, Korczowa and Horyniec-Zdrój. The Soviets also agreed to let Medyka be on the Polish side. The Bieszczady County was also obtained, thanks to the efforts of Stanisław Leszczycki during the negotiations, covering about 300 square km with Halicz and Tarnica peaks.

The dissolution of the Soviet Union into a number of post-Soviet states transformed the Poland-Soviet border into the chain of Poland-Russia, Poland-Lithuania, Poland-Belarus and Poland–Ukraine borders. Poland and Ukraine have confirmed the border on 18 May 1992. It is the longest of Polish eastern borders. The border became much more open compared to the Soviet times, when despite being part of the Eastern Bloc, crossing was very difficult. As the border was opened to mass traffic, the number of people crossing the Polish-Ukrainian border begun rising steadily since 1990, stabilizing around 2000s. Approximately 3 million Ukrainians crossed the border in the 1990s, annually. One of the peak numbers was recorded in 2001, with about 12 million people crossing the border.

With Poland and nine other states joining the European Union in May 2004 the border has become one of the external borders of the European Union. It is one of four EU-Ukraine borders, the others being the Hungary–Ukraine border, Romania–Ukraine border and the Slovakia–Ukraine border. As it is an entry point to the Schengen Area, this introduced a visa requirement for Ukrainian citizens entering Poland as of October 2003. In the period October 2003-September 2004 Polish authorities issued about 620,000 visas to Ukrainians. The visa requirement has not reduced the traffic significantly, as it returned to the prior levels within a year. Another peak has occurred in 2006, when there were almost 20 million border crossings. In 2008 Poland and Ukraine adopted policies on local border traffic (put into effect in 2009). This agreement introduced local border traffic permits, allowing holders to cross the border for up to 90 days per half-year. 2009 saw approximately 12 million border crossings on the Poland–Ukraine border.

On 11 June 2017, the visa policy of the Schengen Area was amended. Ukrainian citizens who hold biometric passports no longer require a visa to enter the Schengen Area (including Poland) for a stay of up to 90 days in a 180-day period.

=== 2023 border blockade ===
On 24 February 2022, Russia has started a war of aggression, the Russo-Ukrainian war. On 6 November 2023, several dozen owners of Polish transport companies blocked three major Poland–Ukraine border crossings to protest claimed unfair competition from Ukrainian transport companies. The protesters said so far during 2023, Ukrainian trucks had crossed the border about 900,000 times compared to about 180,000 times in previous years. A temporary wartime EU agreement allowed Ukrainian trucks to deliver and collect to and from the EU without the usual permits. The agreement only allowed cross-border transports between Ukraine and EU, but protesters claim that Ukrainian drivers started taking cargoes inside EU, quickly pushing out local drivers from the market due to lower operational costs, as they are not subject to EU labour and environmental regulations. The protesters also quoted long 12-14 days wait times and extortion of bribes on the Ukrainian side of the border. The Polish truckers association ZMPD was joined by MKFE (Hungary), Cesmad Bohemia (Czechia), Cesmad Slovakia and Linava (Lithuania).

On 19 November, about 3,000 mostly Ukrainian trucks were stuck at the Dorhusk-Yagodin, Korczowa-Krakovets and Hrebenne-Rava-Ruska border crossings, parked up to 30 kilometres (19 mi) from the crossings. Waiting time for trucks to cross the border was about one week. On 27 November, the blockade was extended to the Medyka-Szeginie/Shehyni crossing. As of 4 December 2023, per Ukrainian e-Cherha system, there were over 22'000 trucks waiting for crossing back into EU on Ukrainian side. On the same day Ukrainian border force announced opening of new exit corridor for empty trucks returning to EU.

On 11 December, some local authorities in Poland withdrew permission for the protests, but a few days later on the 15 December the Lublin regional court revoked one of the decisions and the blockades resumed. One queue was reported as 80 kilometres (50 mi) long.

By February 2024, the blockade had expanded to all major crossings including railways, and protestors had spilt some grain onto the ground from train transport. On 27 February 2024, about 10,000 farmers marched in Warsaw demanding a ban on food imports from Ukraine.

== Characteristics ==
The Poland–Ukraine border is the most often crossed eastern border of the EU.

As of 2013, most of the border traffic was generated by Ukrainian citizens. Petty trade and shopping tourism were driving much of the traffic, with migration for labor purposes being another significant factor.

As of 2011, the border was heavily policed, as it was a major smuggling route into the EU, both for goods and for illegal immigration.

Approximately 8 million people lived in the border area, roughly equally divided between Poland and Ukraine.

== Border crossings ==
There are numerous border crossings between Poland and Ukraine, in a combination of road, rail, passenger and cargo crossings. As of 2026, the following were active (listed from north to south):

Image	Polish Name	Ukrainian name	Polish Road	Ukrainian Road	Type of crossing	Coordinates
	Dorohusk – Jagodzin	Dorohusk- Yahodyn	National road 12 (Poland)	Highway M07 (Ukraine)	Road	
	Dorohusk – Jagodzin	Dorohusk- Yahodyn	–	–	Railway	
	Zosin - Uściług	Zosin - Ustyluh	National road 74 (Poland)	Highway H22 (Ukraine)	Road	
	Hrubieszów - Włodzimierz Wołyński	Hrubeshiv - Volodymyr	-	-	Railway	
	Dołhobyczów – Uhrynów	Dolhobichiv - Uhryniv		T-1408	Road	
	Werchrata – Rawa-Ruska	Verkhrata - Rava-Ruska	-	-	Railway	
	Hrebenne – Rawa-Ruska	Hrebenne - Rava-Ruska	National road 17 (Poland)	Highway M09 (Ukraine)	Road	
	Budomierz – Hruszów	Budomezh - Hrushiv		T-1403	Road	
	Korczowa - Krakowiec	Korchova - Krakovets	A4 autostrada (Poland)	Highway M10 (Ukraine)	Road	
	Medyka – Mościska	Medyka - Mostyska	–	–	Railway	
	Medyka – Szeginie	Medyka - Shehyni	National road 28 (Poland)	Highway M11 (Ukraine)	Road	
	Malhowice – Niżankowice	Malhovitsi - Nyzhankovychi	-	-	Railway	
	Malhowice – Niżankowice	Malhovitsi - Nyzhankovychi		T-1418	Road	
	Krościenko - Chyrów	Korosno - Khyriv	-	-	Railway	
	Krościenko - Smolnica	Korosno - Smilnytsya	National road 84 (Poland)	T-1401	Road	

== See also ==
- 2022–2023 Ukrainian refugee crisis – Ongoing refugee crisis in Europe
- Borders of Poland – Political boundaries between Poland and neighboring territories
- State Border of Ukraine – International boundary of Ukraine
- Curzon Line – Historical demarcation of territories of Poland and the Soviet Union
- Poland–Ukraine relations
- Border Guard (Poland) – Polish organization
- Refugees in Poland
- State Border Guard Service of Ukraine – Law enforcement agency in Ukraine
- Ukraine–European Union relations
