= Brzeźno, Lublin Voivodeship =

Brzeźno
- Village
- Location within Poland
- Coordinates: 51°9′57″N 23°37′47″E
- Country: Poland
- Voivodeship: Lublin
- County: Chełm
- Gmina: Dorohusk

Population
  - Total: 1,200

Brzeźno [ˈbʐɛʑnɔ] is a village in the administrative district of Gmina Dorohusk, within Chełm County, Lublin Voivodeship, in eastern Poland, close to the border with Ukraine.
