= Uhryniv, Ivano-Frankivsk Oblast =

Rural locality in Ivano-Frankivsk Oblast, Ukraine

Coordinates: 48.963991°N 24.685665°E

Uhryniv Угринів
- Village
- Interactive map of Uhryniv
- Country: Ukraine
- Oblast: Ivano-Frankivsk Oblast
- Raion: Ivano-Frankivsk Raion
- Hromada: Uhryniv rural hromada

Population
  - Total: 6,500
- Postal code: 77423

Uhryniv (Ukrainian: Угринів, Polish: Uhrynów) is a village in Ivano-Frankivsk Raion, Ivano-Frankivsk Oblast. It hosts the administration of Uhryniv rural hromada, one of the hromadas of Ukraine. There are over 3,000 residents.

Until 18 July 2020, Uhryniv belonged to Tysmenytsia Raion. The raion was abolished in July 2020 as part of the administrative reform of Ukraine, which reduced the number of raions of Ivano-Frankivsk Oblast to six. The area of Tysmenytsia Raion was merged into Ivano-Frankivsk Raion.

The village is located at the intersection of the Halych highway and Kalush highway. Some commuter trains also stop at the railway station.

The village is first mentioned in the 13th century. Two rivers flow through Uhryniv: the Potik brook and the Bystrytsia river.
