= Lukiv =

Rural locality in Volyn Oblast, Ukraine

Lukiv Луків
- Rural settlement
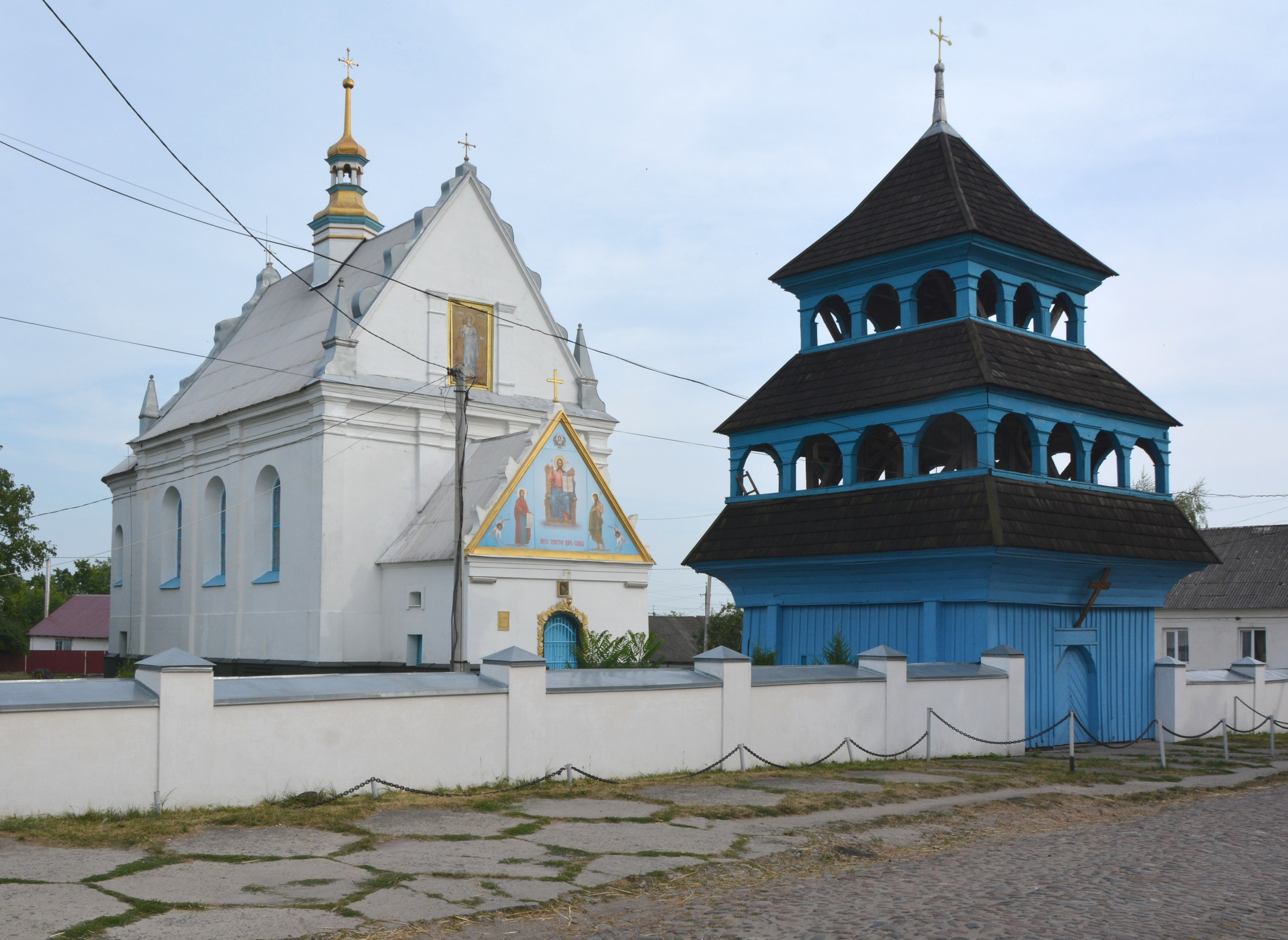
- Church of Theotokos with the belfry

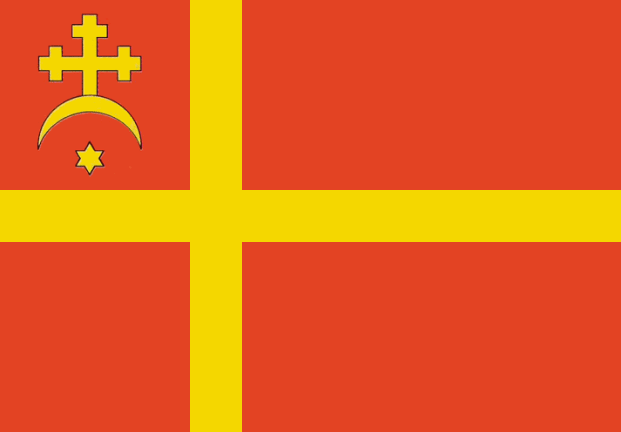
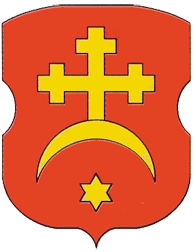
- Flag Coat of arms

- Location in Volyn Oblast Location in Ukraine
- Coordinates: 51°13′53″N 24°20′37″E
- Country: Ukraine
- Oblast: Volyn Oblast
- Raion: Kovel Raion
- Hromada: Lukiv settlement hromada

Population (2022)
  - Total: 2,998
- Time zone: UTC+2 (EET)
  - Summer (DST): UTC+3 (EEST)

Lukiv (Ukrainian: Луків; Polish: Łuków) is a rural settlement in Kovel Raion, Volyn Oblast, western Ukraine. It is located in the northwest of the oblast, about 20 kilometres (12 mi) west of the city of Kovel. Population: 2,998 (2022 estimate).

== History ==
Until 26 January 2024, Lukiv was designated urban-type settlement. On this day, a new law entered into force which abolished this status, and Lukiv became a rural settlement.

== Economy ==
=== Transportation ===
Matsiiv railway station, located in the settlement, is on the railway connecting Kovel and Chełm in Poland. There is no passenger traffic.

The settlement is on Highway M07 connecting Kyiv via Kovel with the Ukrainian-Polish border. It continues across the border to Chełm and Lublin.
